= First Satanic Church =

Satanic religious organisation

- Sigil of Baphomet, an official symbol of LaVeyan Satanism
- Abbreviation: FSC
- Type: New religious movement (Satanism)
- Classification: Atheistic Satanism
- Orientation: LaVeyan Satanism
- Scripture: The Satanic Bible
- Theology: Autotheism
- High Priestess: Karla LaVey
- Headquarters: San Francisco, California
- Founder: Karla LaVey
- Origin: October 31, 1999; San Francisco, California
- Separated from: Church of Satan (1999)
- Official website: www.firstsatanicchurch.com

The First Satanic Church (FSC) is an organization founded by Karla LaVey on October 31, 1999, in San Francisco. The church is dedicated to LaVeyan Satanism as codified by Anton LaVey in the Satanic Bible. The church's stated mission is to carry on the legacy of Anton LaVey through "the study of Satanism and the occult sciences". For over a decade the church operated The 600 Club, a now-defunct Internet forum dedicated to discussions of Satanism.

The church's website claims the organization to have been founded in 1966, and the 1999 date to be a "re-establishment" of the original Church of Satan, claiming direct continuity with Anton LaVey. Karla asserts that she is re-representing the original teachings of her father from which the current administration of the Church of Satan has departed, and maintains an elitist stance of her father's original organization. Anton LaVey's book The Satanic Bible is stated as required reading prior to joining the First Satanic Church.

== History ==
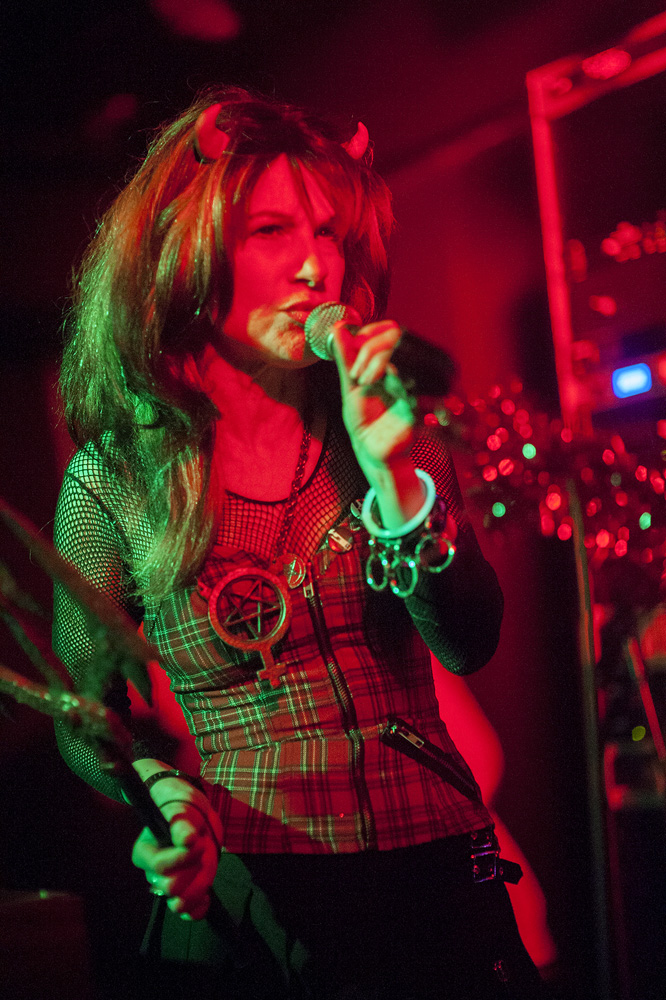
Church founder Karla LaVey during a "Black X-Mass" celebration in 2012

On Walpurgisnacht, April 30, 1966, Anton LaVey founded the "Satanic Church" (which he would later rename the "Church of Satan"). On October 29, 1997, Anton LaVey died of pulmonary edema. On November 7, 1997, Karla held a press conference to announce Anton's death. It was at this time that Blanche Barton and Karla LaVey announced that they would run the Church of Satan as co-High Priestesses. Several days later, Barton produced a hand written will claiming that LaVey had left all of his belongings, property, writings, and royalties, including the Church of Satan, to be put in a trust managed by Barton. Karla contested this will, which was later found to be invalid. A settlement was later reached in which Anton's belongings, intellectual property and royalties would be split among his three children, Karla, Zeena and Xerxes, and that Barton would receive the “corporation known as Church of Satan.”

After LaVey's death, Blanche Barton assumed the administrative leadership of the Church of Satan, although Karla LaVey had not abdicated her role as High Priestess. Shortly thereafter, Barton appointed Peter H. Gilmore and his wife Peggy Nadramia to the positions of High Priest and Priestess, and the Church's headquarters were subsequently moved to New York City. Karla LaVey was critical of Barton's administration of the Church, as she felt the Church's move to New York to be a disservice to her father's legacy. Karla LaVey and Blanche Barton's parting of ways was primarily due to legal disputes regarding Anton LaVey's will and inheritance. Consequently, to carry on the legacy of her father, Karla LaVey founded the "First Satanic Church" and continues to run it out of San Francisco, California.

== Activities ==
The organization maintains only a modest Internet presence. The church held a Walpurgisnacht Show in April 2005 at the 12 Galaxies nightclub in San Francisco, as well as a pre-Halloween benefit show in October 2005 at Edinburgh Castle (also in San Francisco) to help the victims of Hurricanes Katrina and Rita. Since 1998, the Satanic Church has been presenting its Annual Black X-Mass Show every December. These events are open to the public, although membership to the First Satanic Church is only possible by a careful screening after applying through their website.

Karla LaVey hosts a Satanic radio show every week in San Francisco in which she talks and plays the music that she grew up enjoying with her father. Listeners are encouraged to send in their CDs for playing.
