= Satan Takes a Holiday =

Studio album by Anton Szandor LaVey
- Released: 1995
- Recorded: San Francisco, 1995
- Genres: Keyboard music, torch songs, vaudeville, outsider music
- Length: 70:57
- Label: Amarillo
- Producers: Gregg Turkington, Chris X

Anton Szandor LaVey chronology
Strange Music (1994)	Satan Takes a Holiday (1995)

Professional ratings
Review scores
Source	Rating
Allmusic	3/5 stars

Satan Takes a Holiday is an album by Anton Szandor LaVey, the founder of the Church of Satan (CoS). The album was released through Amarillo Records in 1995. The album is an eclectic work of underground music featuring a diverse mix of musical styles as well as lyrical topics, with its songs being primarily based on LaVey's personal interest in the synthesizer. Blanche Barton and Nick Bougas also provide vocals.

== Background and release ==
In addition to founding LaVeyan Satanism as a belief system, LaVey had a long career as a showman and particularly as a musician, which the album had captured. In contrast to the dramatic and serious public image often associated with LaVey and his doctrines, with his words and actions drawing controversy, the album is a frequently comedic release intended for straightforward entertainment purposes featuring popular music styles of a "lighthearted" nature, including lyrics with romantic appeals and merry-go-round type carnival backgrounds. It additionally features materials from a diverse array of songwriters, including media created in the 19th Century.

The album was originally released by Amarillo Records in 1995. It was re-released in 2002 by Reptilian Records.

Satan Takes a Holiday is an eclectic body of songs that LaVey primarily constructed using his personal synthesizer. A few of these tracks are standards, being associated with famous media of years prior, and their composers well known. Nevertheless, LaVey chose all of these songs to create deliberate modes of feeling in terms of emotional tone.

LaVey is joined on this recording by Blanche Barton, another celebrity who's otherwise best known for serving as the "High Priestess" of the CoS. Nick Bougas additionally takes part; Bougas was the director of LaVey's film biography titled Speak of the Devil.

Its title is a reference to the notorious Tommy Dorsey & His Orchestra release of the same name alongside multiple previous forms of popular media known as _____ Takes a Holiday. These include the drama movies Death Takes a Holiday and Sin Takes a Holiday among other things.

== Track listing ==
1. "Satan Takes a Holiday" – written in 1937 by bandleader Larry Clinton. Arranged for Hammond Novacord. Originally used as background music for "magic acts and midnight spook shows".
2. "Answer Me" – A German love song from 1953 by Gerhard Winkler and Fred Rauch, with a translation by Carl Sigman. Vocal by A. LaVey.
3. "The Whirling Dervish" – Written in 1938 by Harry Warren and Al Dubin for the film Garden of the Moon.
4. "Chloe, or the Song of the Swamp" – Written by Gus Kahn and Neil Moret in 1927. This is a tale of lost love told from the perspective of the abandoned one. Vocal by N. Bougas.
5. "Thine Alone" – Bombastic version of a 1917 piece by Victor Herbert and Henry Blossom, for stage show, called Eileen.
6. "Golden Earrings" – Written by Jay Livingston and Ray Evans for the film of the same name, starring Marlene Dietrich. Vocal by A. LaVey, credited as "The Tipsy Gypsy".
7. "The More I See You" – Written by Harry Warden with words by Mack Gordon. Vocal by N. Bougas.
8. "Band Organ Medley
  - "Money in My Clothes" – A 1934 song written by Irving Kahal and Sammy Fain.
  - "Taboo" – 1941 piece by Margarita Lecuona.
  - "Giovanni" – Standard Band Organ Waltz composer and date unknown
  - "Yankee Rose" – by Abe Frankel and Sidney Holden, written in 1926.
9. "Hello, Central, Give Me No Man's Land" – Written by Sam L. Lewis, Joe Young, and Jean Schwartz about a young boy trying to use the telephone to talk to his father who's been killed in the war. Vocal by A. LaVey
10. "Blue Prelude" – 1933 suicide song by Gordon Jenkins and Joe Bishop. Vocal by B. Barton.
11. "Softly, as in a Morning Sunrise" – By Sigmund Romberg and Oscar Hammerstein II, for the 1928 operetta, "The New Moon". A song about love's betrayal. Vocal by N. Bougas.
12. "Honolulu Baby" – Written by T. Marvin Hatley in 1933 as background music for the Laurel and Hardy comedy, Sons of the Desert. Vocal by A. LaVey.
13. "Variations on the Mooche" – Written by Duke Ellington and Irving Mills, 1928 and favored by exotic dancers.
14. "Here Lies Love" – Suicide song written by Leo Robin and Ralph Rainger for the 1933 film, The Big Broadcast. Vocal by N. Bougas.
15. "Dixie" – Written by Daniel Emmett in 1860. Vocal by N. Bougas.
16. "If You Were the Only Girl in the World" – By Nat D. Ayer and Clifford Grey, 1916. Vocal by A. LaVey.
17. "Satan Takes a Holiday (reprise)" – Vocal treatment of title track by Blanche Barton.
18. "Satanis Theme" – Written in 1968 by LaVey for the film, Satanis.

The information for the track listings were lifted, at times verbatim, from the liner notes for the CD of this release. Copyright Amarillo Records, 1995.

== Reception ==
Unlike the public image often associated with his words and actions, and the surrounding controversy, the album has received positive reviews from publications such as AllMusic and is known for its often comedic approach, emphasizing straightforward entertainment. Scholar James R. Lewis of the book Satanism Today: An Encyclopedia of Religion, Folklore, and Popular Culture has asserted that "LaVey's musicianship is preserved" in both the album and a previous release from 1994 in songs that "are impressive", particularly given LaVey's abilities in musical engineering. A praising review by music journalist Greg Prato of AllMusic remarked that "[b]efore listening to this album, one must cast aside all preconceptions of... LaVey". Prato regarded LaVey's diverse take in both musical genres and instrumental skills as "comforting" to the listener, in the context of the whole album's "spooky" nature.

== Usage in popular culture ==
Figure skating world champion Javier Fernández performed a short program to "Satan Takes a Holiday" during the 2013–14 season in his sport. This time period included the XXII Olympic Winter Games in Sochi. The program was choreographed by David Wilson.

== See also ==
- 1995 in music
- Comedy music
- Outsider music
- Underground music
