= Psychic vampire =

Creature in folklore

A psychic vampire is a vampire-like creature in folklore said to feed off the "life force" of other living creatures. The term can also be used to describe a person who gets increased energy around other people, but leaves those other people exhausted or "drained" of energy. Psychic vampires are represented in the occult beliefs of various cultures and in fiction.

== Psychic energy ==
Terms used to describe the substance or essence that psychic vampires take or receive from others include: energy, qi (or ch'i), life force, prana, and vitality. There is no scientific or medical evidence supporting the existence of the bodily or psychic energy they allegedly drain.

== Emotional vampires ==
American author Albert Bernstein uses the phrase "emotional vampire" for people with various personality disorders who are often considered to drain emotional energy from others.

== Energy vampires ==
The term "energy vampire" is also used metaphorically to refer to people whose influence leaves a person feeling exhausted, unfocused, and depressed, without ascribing the phenomenon to psychic interference.

Dion Fortune wrote of psychic parasitism in relation to vampirism as early as 1930 in her book, Psychic Self-Defense. Fortune considered psychic vampirism a combination of psychic and psychological pathology, and distinguished between what she considered to be true psychic vampirism and mental conditions that produce similar symptoms. For the latter, she named folie à deux and similar phenomena.

The term "psychic vampire" was popularized in the 1960s by Anton LaVey and his Church of Satan. LaVey wrote on the topic in his book, The Satanic Bible, and claimed to have coined the term. LaVey used psychic vampire to mean a spiritually or emotionally weak person who drains vital energy from other people. Adam Parfrey likewise attributed the term to LaVey in an introduction to The Devil's Notebook.

The English singer-songwriter Peter Hammill credits his erstwhile Van der Graaf Generator colleague, violinist Graham Smith, with coining the term "energy vampires" in the 1970s in order to describe intrusive, over-zealous fans. Hammill included a song of the same name on his 1978 album The Future Now.

In the 1982 horror movie One Dark Night, Karl “Raymar” Raymarseivich is the name of a Russian psychic vampire who gains power from the lifeforce of young victims by frightening them to death. This is done by demonstrations of telekinesis which emanates as visible electrical currents of bioenergy. How he dies is unclear, but his malevolence posthumously remains in his body. Effectively, Raymar is a poltergeist in the mausoleum he is interred in, opening crypts (including his own), sliding out the caskets to the floor and randomly exhuming his fellow corpses to terrify unfortunate teenagers who have chosen the wrong place to have an overnight initiation.

The terms "energy vampire" and "psychic vampire" have been used as synonyms in Russia since the fall of the Soviet Union as part of an occult revival.

The 2019 American comedy horror television series What We Do in the Shadows includes the character Colin Robinson, a metaphorical and literal "energy vampire" who drains people's life forces by being boring or frustrating.

=== Vampire subculture ===
Sociologists such as Mark Benecke and A. Asbjørn Jøn have identified a subculture of people who present themselves as vampires. Jon has noted that enthusiasts of the vampire subculture emulate traditional psychic vampires in that they describe 'prey[ing] upon life-force or 'pranic' energy'. Prominent figures in the subculture include Michelle Belanger, a self-described psychic vampire, who wrote a book titled The Psychic Vampire Codex: A Manual of Magick and Energy Work, published in 2004 by Weiser Books. Belanger details a vampiric approach to energy work which she believes psychic vampires can use to heal others, representing an attempt to disassociate the psychic vampire subculture from negative connotations of vampirism. Other authors on the subject include Don Webb, Father Sebastiann, Raven Kaldera and Sean Wilde.

== Sexual vampires ==
A related mythological creature is a sexual vampire, which is supposed to feed off sexual energy. Sexual vampires include succubi or incubi.

== Popular culture ==
- Psychic vampires appear in Lifeforce.
- Psychic vampires appear in Doctor Sleep.
- Psychic vampires appear in What We Do in the Shadows.

== See also ==
- Asura
- Huli Jing
- Hungry ghost
- Obake
- Odic force
- Pranayama
- Rakshasa
