= The Black Flame (magazine) =

Church of Satan magazine

- Cover of the vol. 6, no. 1/2 issue
- Categories: Religious magazine
- Frequency: Irregular
- Publisher: Church of Satan
- First issue: 1989
- Final issue Number: 2005; 16
- Country: United States
- Based in: New York
- Language: English
- ISSN: 1523-410X
- OCLC: 35367287

The Black Flame was the official outlet of the Church of Satan, launched in 1989 when The Cloven Hoof, another Church publication, went on hiatus. The Black Flame was originally a quarterly newsletter, subsequently evolving into a biannual publication. Printed by Hell's Kitchen Productions Inc., the magazine ceased in 2005 following the publication of issue #16.

== History ==
The Black Flame was launched by Peter H. Gilmore and Peggy Nadramia when The Cloven Hoof, another Church of Satan (CoS) publication, when that went on hiatus. It was initially not a successor but a companion to The Cloven Hoof, but that was eventually shuttered and The Black Flame replaced it as the official outlet of the CoS. It was printed by Hell's Kitchen Productions Inc. in New York.

The Black Flame was originally a quarterly newsletter, subsequently evolving into a biannual publication in late 1990. Its schedule was inconsistent and sometimes its numbers were combined. It was originally subtitled A Quarterly Forum for Satanic Thought, this later changing to International Forum of the Church of Satan in 1991.

The magazine ceased in 2005 following the publication of issue #16. The final issue included a note that it was the final issue in magazine format, saying they would have the next issue be in book format, though this never occurred.

== Contents ==
It was the official outlet of the Church. Scholars have noted it as representing "Satanic orthodoxy"; it discussed Satanic ideology and the Nine Statements of LaVeyan Satanism.

Scholar Graham Harvey noted that, as with LaVey's writings, "continually speak about Satan as if the name referred to an actual entity who speaks, acts, plans, desires, inspires and is addressed and summoned". The magazine served as a major nexus for independent CoS supporters and as the international forum for the organization. According to a self report, issues generally sold between 7,000 and 8,000 copies each.

The magazine carried media reviews and interviews. As with its predecessor, it published CoS founder Anton LaVey's essays on a variety of topics, including cultural and music topics as well as Satanism. Blanche Barton edited, as did Gilmore. Essays from, among others, Kerry Bolton, Michael J. Moynihan, also appeared in the magazine. Nick Bougas at times drew covers. Moynihan did several interviews for the magazine, including with LaVey.

== Reception ==
A review in Factsheet Five praised it as "a slick looking, very serious, Satanic magazine", and complimenting one of its editorials on "the horrors of grocery shopping" as funny.
