= Speak of the Devil (1993 film) =

1993 film by Nick Bougas

- Directed by: Nick Bougas
- Produced by: Nick Bougas
- Starring: Anton LaVey
- Edited by: Nick Bougas; Sandra Weinberg
- Production company: Wavelength Video
- Release date: 1993
- Running time: 90 minutes
- Country: United States
- Language: English

Speak of the Devil: The Canon of Anton LaVey is a 1993 American documentary film about Church of Satan founder Anton LaVey. It was directed by Nick Bougas, with assistance from Adam Parfrey. The film was released on VHS in 1993 through Wavelength Video.

== Background and production ==
The film was directed by Nick Bougas. It was produced by Wavelength Video, which Bougas was an employee of, and distributed by Wavelength and Feral House Video in 1993. It was a project for Wavelength Video. Ray Atheron was executive producer, Adam Parfrey is credited for the camerawork, and Bougas and Sandra Weinberg are credited as editors.

Anton LaVey, the founder of the Church of Satan, had been the focus of a previous documentary, the 1970 film Satanis: The Devil's Mass. Parfrey conducted and filmed many of the interviews. Parfrey bought a HI-8 camera to film the production. According to Parfrey, he did most of the camera work, while Bougas did most of the editing.

Speak of the Devil was in part a continuation of a failed video production within the Church of Satan, involving Bougas, LaVey's daughter Zeena LaVey, and her husband Nikolas Schreck, designed to explain LaVey's ideology to the public. Schreck disavowed the program shortly afterwards (calling it "not good"); it was never released, and Zeena and Schreck later ceased affiliated with the Church of Satan. Outtakes from the film were released in 2018 as Anton LaVey: A Drink with the Devil.

== Synopsis ==
Speaking to Adam Parfrey, the interviews with LaVey cover a range of topics, including early influences such as the Johnson Smith catalogs. Footage of LaVey's performances are shown alongside a tour of The Black House, the Church headquarters in San Francisco, complete with ritual chamber, music room, and library. It also includes footage of a television show LaVey featured on in the 1960s. LaVey elaborates on his ideology, life, and interests.

The film adapts and includes clips from some material from older films, including the 1922 silent film Häxan. It also includes an interview with filmmaker Larry Wessel, discussing LaVey's book The Satanic Bible, shot in 1992.

In an outtake for the film, LaVey made statements expressing derision towards LGBTQ people, Jewish people, black people, and other races.

== Reception and analysis ==
Nathaniel Thompson, writing for Turner Classic Movies, described the film as attempting to serve as a counterpoint to a 1991 Rolling Stone article that sought to debunk many of LaVey's biographical claims. Writer Carl Abrahamsson considered it to be much of an "in-house" Church of Satan production. He described the film as "cleverly edited" by Bougas, and as "a peek straight into the official mind of Anton LaVey".

Scholar Jesper Aa. Petersen considered it an important source on modern satanism. Scholar Chris Mathews found the film to show LaVey as a "nostalgic recluse, entranced by the prank books of his childhood" and his fascination with mannequins; he found this to indicate LaVey's "increasing estrangement from society".
