= The Satanic Mass =

- Album cover featuring the Sigil of Baphomet

Studio album by Anton Szandor LaVey
- Released: 1968
- Recorded: September 13, 1968
- Venues: San Francisco, California
- Studio: The Black House
- Genre: Spoken word
- Labels: Murgenstrumm (1968); Amarillo (1995); Adversary Recordings

The Satanic Mass: Recorded Live at the Church of Satan is the first released audio recording of a Satanic ritual by high priest Anton Szandor LaVey, recorded September 13, 1968 at Church of Satan headquarters, known as The Black House. The album was originally released as a vinyl LP in 1968, on LaVey's own label Murgenstrumm. It was reissued by Amarillo Records on June 21, 1995.

Side one of the album features an audio recording of the baptism of LaVey's daughter, Zeena. Side two features (pre-publication) excerpts from The Satanic Bible recited by LaVey over the music of Ludwig van Beethoven, Richard Wagner, and John Philip Sousa.

== Track listing ==
No.	Title	Length
1.	"The Satanic Mass"	19:48
2.	"Prologue"	2:45
3.	"Book of Satan, Verse I"	2:47
4.	"Verse II"	3:27
5.	"Verse III"	2:56
6.	"Verse IV"	1:47
7.	"Verse V"	2:54
8.	"Hymn of the Satanic Empire, or the Battle Hymn of the Apocalypse"	13:20

== See also ==
- "Satanic Mass", the final track on Coven's 1969 album Witchcraft Destroys Minds & Reaps Souls.
