= The Church of Satan (book) =

- Author: Blanche Barton
- Language: English
- Series: United States
- Subject: Church of Satan, Satanic panic
- Genre: Biography
- Publisher: Hell's Kitchen Productions
- Publication date: 1990
- Publication place: United States
- Pages: 200
- ISBN: 0962328626

The Church of Satan: A History of the World's Most Notorious Religion is a book by Blanche Barton, published on November 1, 1990 by Hell's Kitchen Productions.

== Contents ==
Chapter one, "Let the Games Begin", opens with quotes from proponents and opponents of Satanism with illustrative examples of contemporary Satanic practice. It then provides reasons for (and the context into which) Anton LaVey founded the Church of Satan and the religion of Satanism. The second chapter, "Diabolical Consequences", covers the media response to CoS activities and the notable personalities it attracted. The cultural and personal impact of Satanism are discussed, as is the mid-1970s re-organization of the Church. Chapter three, "The Modern Prometheus", gives a biographical sketch of LaVey. In chapter four, "What Demons Conjured?", a catalog of the CoS's influence on popular culture and occultism is presented; as are rebuttals to the claims of "Satanbusters" and "survivors of Satanic ritual abuse". Chapter five, "Satanism in Theory and Practice", covers the unique nature of Satanism as (not just a religious identity, but) a theory of aesthetics and an ethnology. Reflections on the popularity of Satanic imagery are given. It reprints the "Nine Satanic Statements" and the "Nine Satanic Sins". LaVey responds to some of the frequent accusations against Satanism. In the sixth chapter, "Satan's Master Plan", LaVey affirms "his commitment to destroy Christianity and herd mentality in all forms." It presents the "Five-Point Program" of Satanic goals to change the world. The "Eleven Satanic Rules of the Earth" are reprinted, as is the "Hymn of the Satanic Empire". The seventh chapter informs the reader on "How to Perform Satanic Rituals". It presents five "main elements...central to success" at achieving magical results. Several specific misconceptions of Satanism are then addressed. Advice on magical effectiveness and evading common snares are given. The eighth and final chapter presents "Guidelines for Grottos and Groups". It begins with a description of a typical CoS ritual. LaVey's view of the desire to join groups and perform group rituals is given, with advice on what to watch out for (in a Satanic bunco tip sheet). Recommendations on how to meet other Satanists, start groups, name grottos, and execute rituals are given. LaVey encourages Satanists to "make pioneering discoveries and achievements" as a way of forcing "objective authorities... to see and acknowledge the quality, productivity and superiority of Satanic thought." Four appendices are included: In "Letters: 'Many Are Called...'" a collection of sample letters the CoS has received is presented; "Satanic Music: That Old Black Magic"; "Satanic Cinema: Down These Mean Streets"; and "Further Reading: The Devil's Bookshelf".
