= Sigil of Baphomet =

Sigil of the material world

The white-on-black rendition of the sigil of Baphomet associated with the Church of Satan

The sigil of Baphomet is a sigil of the material world, representing carnality and earthly principles.

While the eponymous Baphomet had been depicted as a goat-headed figure since at least 1856, the goat's head inside an inverted pentagram was largely popularized by the modern Church of Satan, founded in 1966. The Church adopted the sigil of Baphomet as their official insignia, describing the symbol as the "...preeminent visual distillation of the iconoclastic philosophy of Satanism."

== Origins ==
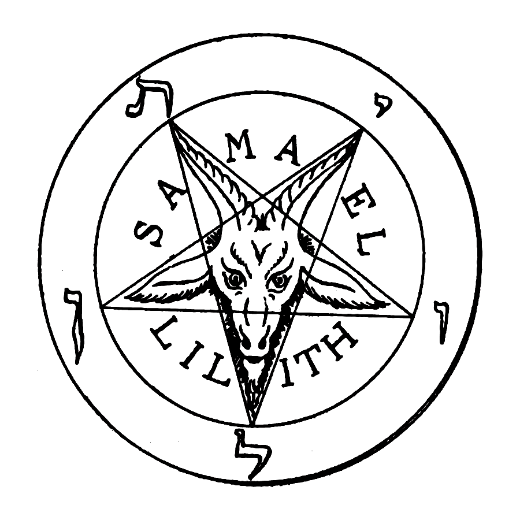
The 1897 illustration with "Samael" and "Lilith" text

The depiction of an inverted pentagram with a goat's head, paired with five Hebrew letters at the pentagram points, first appeared in the 1897 book La Clef de la Magie Noire by French occultist Stanislas de Guaita. The Hebrew letters spell out Leviathan (לויתן), the ancient serpent from the biblical Chaoskampf, while the 1897 symbol is further augmented by the text "Samael" and "Lilith". With the pentagram inverted, matter is ruling over spirit, a condition associated with evil. In his book, de Guaita also illustrates an upright pentagram with the Pentagrammaton (יהשוה) at the vertices of the pentagram: an esoteric version of the Hebrew name of Jesus, Yeshua (ישוע), by adding the letter shin (ש) in the middle of the Tetragrammaton divine name Yod-He-Vav-He (יהוה). The lower four points represented the four elements of the material world, while the uppermost point represented spirit ruling over matter. As influenced by the 19th-century French occultist Éliphas Lévi, an inverted pentagram represents materiality while an upright pentagram accordingly symbolizes holiness.

== Modern Satanism ==
This symbol was later reproduced in A Pictorial History of Magic and the Supernatural by Maurice Bessy. Anton LaVey, founder of the Church of Satan, acquired Bessy's book during his research into the "black arts". LaVey adapted the symbol from Bessy's book, with the "Samael" and "Lilith" text removed. This version was drawn by LaVey and attributed to "Hugo Zorilla" (a pseudonym used by LaVey in some of his art).

In the formative years of the Church of Satan, this particular version of the symbol was utilized on membership cards, stationery, medallions, and most notably above the altar in the ritual chamber of the Black House. The complete graphic first appeared publicly on the cover of The Satanic Mass album in 1968, then on The Satanic Bible cover in 1969, and first named as the Sigil of Baphomet in The Satanic Rituals book in 1972.

Later Satanic organizations have subsequently adapted the sigil of Baphomet, as seen in the logos of Joy of Satan Ministries and the Satanic Temple.

== See also ==
- Baphomet
- LaVeyan Satanism
- List of occult symbols
- List of sigils of demons
