= Satanic ritual =

Satanic ritual may refer to:

== Religion ==
- Black Mass, a Satanic Mass
- Deal with the Devil, a pact between a person and the Devil or another demon
- Greater and lesser magic, LaVeyan Satanic magic
- Satanic panic, a religious moral panic

== Other uses ==
- The Satanic Rituals, a 1972 book by Anton LaVey

== See also ==
- Satanic Rites, a 1983 album by Hellhammer
- The Satanic Rites of Dracula, a 1973 British film
