= Satan Speaks! =

1998 book of essays by Anton LaVey

- Author: Anton LaVey
- Language: English
- Series: United States
- Subject: Various
- Publisher: Feral House
- Publication date: 1998
- Media type: Print
- Pages: 192
- ISBN: 0922915660

Satan Speaks! is a book of essays by Anton LaVey, published in 1998 by Feral House following his October 1997 death. It includes a foreword by Marilyn Manson, an introduction by Blanche Barton and cover art by Coop.
