= The Devil's Rain (film) =

1975 film by Robert Fuest

- Theatrical release poster
- Directed by: Robert Fuest
- Written by: Gabe Essoe; James Ashton; Gerald Hopman
- Produced by: James V. Cullen; Michael S. Glick
- Starring: Ernest Borgnine; Eddie Albert; William Shatner; Keenan Wynn; Tom Skerritt; Joan Prather; Ida Lupino; Anton LaVey
- Cinematography: Alex Phillips, Jr.
- Edited by: Michael Kahn
- Music by: Al De Lory
- Production company: Sandy Howard Productions; Estudios Churubusco
- Distributed by: Bryanston Distributing Company (U.S.)
- Release date: 7 August 1975 (New York)
- Running time: 85 minutes
- Countries: Mexico; United States
- Language: English
- Box office: $1.8 million

The Devil's Rain is a 1975 supernatural horror film directed by Robert Fuest, featuring an ensemble cast of William Shatner, Tom Skerritt, Ernest Borgnine, Eddie Albert, Ida Lupino and Keenan Wynn. John Travolta makes his debut film appearance in a minor role, and Church of Satan founder Anton LaVey is credited as the film's technical advisor and also appears in a minor role. The film centers around the Preston family, who are involved in a generations-long curse brought upon them by Satanic priest Jonathan Corbis (Borgnine).

An international co-production between Mexico and the United States, the film was shot in Durango, Mexico and at Estudios Churubusco in late 1974. It was released in the United States on August 7, 1975. The Devil's Rain received mixed-to-negative reviews from critics, though it has developed a cult following.

== Plot ==
A curse affects the Preston family, caused by their betrayal of the Satanic priest Jonathan Corbis in colonial New England. Corbis has harassed the Preston family for generations to obtain a book containing the signatures of the members of his cult which bind their souls to Satan. Corbis captures patriarch Steve Preston, who is allowed to escape to warn his wife Emma and son Mark. He tells them to give the book to Corbis, before melting into a waxy substance. Mark advises Emma to keep the book hidden and entrusts her to family friend John. However, moments after he leaves to meet Corbis, he hears Emma scream and returns to find the Satanists have abducted Emma, leaving John bound, hanging by his feet and terrified.

In a ghost town in the desert, Mark challenges Corbis to a battle of faith. Corbis leads Mark to his cult's church where he reveals that Emma has joined them, as reflected by her now eyeless face. When Mark refuses to do the same, he is surrounded and overwhelmed by Corbis's followers.

Sheriff Owens scoffs at John's story of eyeless cultists living in a long-deserted town and refuses to conduct a search for the three missing Prestons, so Mark's older brother, Tom, and his wife Julie search for them on their own. In the ghost town they are attacked by Satanists. After escaping, Tom sends Julie to summon the authorities while he returns to rescue Mark. En route, Julie is captured by a Satanist who was hiding in her car.

Wearing the robe of a defeated Satanist, Tom infiltrates Corbis's church, where Corbis performs a ceremony to convert Mark into one of his eyeless minions. Tom is discovered by the Satanists, but eludes capture. He and Dr. Sam Richards, a psychic researcher, review the book, which explains that the source of Corbis's power is an ornate glass bottle known as "The Devil's Rain", which contains the souls of Corbis's disciples. They also find Mark's signature in the book, which Richards is sure was not there the last time Mark had the book.

Tom and Richards head to Corbis's church and remove The Devil's Rain from its hiding place. The Satanists converge on the church, so Tom and Richards retreat, taking The Devil's Rain but leaving behind the book, which is taken by Corbis. As Corbis begins the ceremony to convert Julie to an eyeless one, Tom jumps in to intervene, and is captured as well. Richards threatens to destroy The Devil's Rain, but is overpowered by the Satanists, and Mark takes the Devil's Rain from him. Richards tells Mark that he can still save his soul by destroying the bottle, while Corbis maintains that if the bottle is destroyed Mark will wander through nothingness for eternity, unable to enter either Heaven or Hell. Mark smashes the bottle. The Devil's Rain is released from the bottle, melting the Satanists (including Mark and Corbis) and burning down the church. Tom and Julie make a hasty exit. As Tom embraces Julie, it is revealed that he is actually embracing Corbis, and that his wife's soul has become trapped within a new Devil's Rain.

== Cast ==
- Ernest Borgnine as Jonathan Corbis: The head priest of the Satanist cult. Borgnine appeared in the film fresh from his successes with The Poseidon Adventure and Emperor of the North Pole.
- Eddie Albert as Dr. Sam Richards: A psychic researcher who aids the Preston family. The Devil's Rain came in the short interval between Albert's starring runs on Green Acres and Switch.
- William Shatner as Mark Preston: The younger son of the Preston family; though devoutly Christian, he is forcibly converted to the Satanist cult. The Devil's Rain was one of several B-films in which Shatner starred between the original Star Trek television series (1966–69) and Star Trek: The Motion Picture (1979).
- Ida Lupino as Emma Preston: The matriarch of the Preston family.
- Tom Skerritt as Tom Preston: The elder son of the Preston family, who sets out to rescue his mother and brother from the Satanists.
- Joan Prather as Julie Preston
- Keenan Wynn as Sheriff Owens
- John Travolta as Danny, a member of the Satanist cult
- George Sawaya as Steve Preston
- Anton LaVey as High Priest
- Diane LaVey as Priscilla Corbis
- Woodrow Chambliss as John
- Lisa Todd as Lilith
- Claudio Brook as Preacher Blythe

== Production ==
Although The Devil's Rain takes place in an unspecified part of the American Southwest, it was shot in Durango, Mexico and at Estudios Churubusco in Mexico City. Filming took place in late 1974. During filming, actor John Travolta was introduced to Scientology after co-star Joan Prather gave him a copy of the book Dianetics, written by Scientology founder L. Ron Hubbard.

A mold of actor William Shatner's face taken during the production of The Devil's Rain was used by Halloween mask company Don Post Studios to create a mask that would later be purchased from a magic shop by the production team of the slasher film Halloween (1978); the mask, which the crew spray-painted white, was worn by actor Nick Castle as the film's antagonist, Michael Myers. The makeup effects in the film were designed by Thomas R. Burman.

Years after the film's release, Ernest Borgnine claimed that the film was financed using mafia money, and that he was never paid for his work. The film's distributor, Bryanston Distributing Company, was known to have close links to the Colombo crime family.

== Release ==
The Devil's Rain was released on June 18, 1975, with screenings in Illinois, Kansas and Missouri. Showings in New York followed on August 7 and in Los Angeles on August 13. It was re-released in 1978 by Joseph Brenner Associates.

=== Home media ===
In 2017, Severin Films released the film on Blu-ray, featuring a 2K restoration from the film's original interpositive as well as various special features.

== Reception ==
=== Box office ===
Sandy Howard claimed the film earned back its cost in 45 days.

=== Critical reception ===
Jonathan Rosenbaum wrote in The Monthly Film Bulletin wrote: "If there is anything to recommend this confusing horror exercise, then it surely isn't the direction, which veers throughout from the pedestrian to the stilted. Nor is it the script, which raises more questions in a single reel than it can resolve in three, while satanic effects are piled on at every possible juncture, with gore virtually used to plaster over every gaping loophole."

In The Radio Times Guide to Films Alan Jones gave the film a score of three out of five stars, calling it a "colourful, if confusing satanic shocker," and writing: "Worth persevering through the muddled set-up for the effects-laden climax where most of the cast are reduced to screaming, oozing slime."

Vincent Canby in The New York Times opined that "The Devil's Rain is ostensibly a horror film, but it barely manages to be a horror ... It is as horrible as watching an egg fry."

Roger Ebert in the Chicago Sun-Times said "All of this would be good silly fun if the movie weren't so painfully dull. The problem is that the material's stretched too thin. There's not enough here to fill a feature-length film." He particularly derided the exhaustive melting of the Satanists at the finale. He gave the film one-and-a-half stars out of four, and eventually added it to his "Most Hated" movies list.

In his 2010 book Showgirls, Teen Wolves, and Astro Zombies, Australian film reviewer Michael Adams called The Devil's Rain "the ultimate cult movie ... It's about a cult, has a cult following, was devised with input from a cult leader, and saw a future superstar [Travolta] indoctrinated into a cult he'd help popularize [Scientology]."

== See also ==
- List of American films of 1975
- List of Mexican films of 1975
- List of horror films of 1975
