= The Satanic Witch =

Book by Anton Szandor LaVey

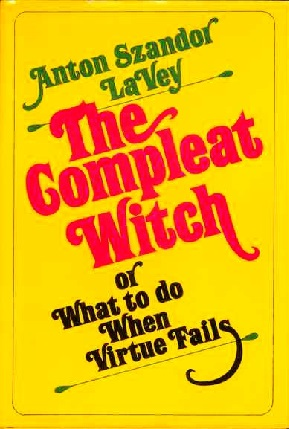
- Cover of the first edition
- Author: Anton LaVey
- Original title: The Compleat Witch
- Language: English
- Subject: Lesser magic, witchcraft
- Publisher: Dodd, Mead & Company (1971); Lancer Books (1972); Feral House (1989, 2003–present)
- Publication date: 1971
- Publication place: United States
- Media type: Print (Hardcover & Paperback)
- Pages: 284
- ISBN: 978-0922915842

The Satanic Witch is a book by Anton LaVey, currently published by Feral House. The book is a treatise on lesser magic, a system of manipulation by means of applied psychology and glamour (or "wile and guile") to bend an individual or situation to one's will. The book is introduced as an extension of LaVey's witches workshops which were conducted prior to the founding of the Church. The book presents its methods as a tool of the feminine, and how the female can enchant and manipulate men.

The book was first published as The Compleat Witch, or What to Do When Virtue Fails, in 1971 by Dodd, Mead & Company. The first paperback edition was released by Lancer Books in 1972. It was republished by Feral House in 1989 with an introduction by Zeena LaVey, wherein it was retitled The Satanic Witch; and again in 2003 with a new introduction by Peggy Nadramia and afterword by Blanche Barton. The book concludes with a bibliography of over 170 books on topics of psychology, anthropology, sociology, biology and volumes on sexuality and body language. Notable authors cited include Jacques Bergier, E.A. Wallis Budge, Charles Darwin, Maya Deren, Sándor Ferenczi, Sigmund Freud, Erving Goffman, Ernst Kretschmer, Abraham Maslow, Desmond Morris, William Mortensen, Louis Pauwels, Wilhelm Reich, William H. Sheldon, and Marcello Truzzi. The publisher describes the book as "...undiluted Gypsy lore regarding the forbidden knowledge of seduction and manipulation."

== Editions ==
- LaVey, Anton Szandor. The Satanic Witch. (2003 2nd ed. 1st printing), Feral House. ISBN 0-922915-84-9
