= The Secret Life of a Satanist =

- Author: Blanche Barton
- Language: English
- Series: United States
- Subject: Anton LaVey
- Genre: Biography
- Publisher: Feral House
- Publication date: 1992, 2003
- Pages: 262

The Secret Life of a Satanist: The Authorized Biography of Anton LaVey is a biography on the life of Anton LaVey, the founder of LaVeyan Satanism and the Church of Satan, released in 1990 through Feral House publishing. The book is written by Blanche Barton, administrator of the Church of Satan and partner and confidant of LaVey.

== Bibliography ==
- Lewis, James R. (2002). "Diabolical Authority: Anton LaVey, The Satanic Bible and the Satanist 'Tradition'". Marburg Journal of Religion. 7 (1). University of Marburg. doi:10.17192/mjr.2002.7.3733. ISSN 1612-2941.
