= Diane Hegarty =

American religious leader (1942–2022)

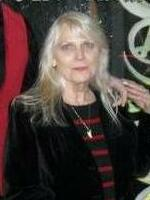
- Hegarty at "Anton LaVey – Art Incarnate" auction in Glendale, California in February 2009
- Born: July 10, 1942; Chicago, Illinois, U.S.
- Died: July 23, 2022 (aged 80)
- Other names: Diane LaVey, Diana Hall
- Known for: Church of Satan
- Board member of: Chairperson of Graphological Society of San Francisco for 10 years, a member GSSF for over 25 and AHAF (American Handwriting Analysis Foundation)
- Partner: Anton LaVey (1960–1984)
- Children: Zeena Schreck
- Website: "Diana Hall aka Diane Hegarty Graphological Society Of San Francisco Website".

Diane Hegarty (July 10, 1942 – July 23, 2022) was an American religious leader who, along with longtime partner Anton LaVey, co-founded the Church of Satan.

== Biography ==
Hegarty, also known as Diane LaVey and Diana Hall, was born July 10, 1942. As well as being a self-described sorceress, Diane was a co-founder with Anton LaVey of the Church of Satan and served as High Priestess for approximately 25 years.

Anton LaVey divorced his first wife, Carole, and began a relationship with Hegarty that lasted 24 years, from 1960 to 1984. They had a child, Zeena Schreck (née LaVey). At the end of their relationship Diane Hegarty sued for palimony. She appears in many of the filmed rituals of the Church. These have become stock footage for anyone desiring a depiction of Satanism. Along with her Satanic duties as hostess, model enchantress, mother and magician's wife, she helped Anton raise a lion cub named Togare.

Hegarty administered the Church and typed and edited The Satanic Bible, The Satanic Rituals, The Compleat Witch (aka The Satanic Witch) and The Devil’s Notebook. She did most of the Church's administrative, press and member relations work. Their daughter Zeena was in the media spotlight at age 3, at her Satanic baptism, and again defending the Church of Satan against allegations of Satanic ritual abuse as public representative and High Priestess of the Church of Satan between 1985 and 1990 during the 1980s Satanic panic in America. Daughter Zeena resigned from the Church of Satan and renounced LaVeyan Satanism to pursue her own spiritual path in 1990 and ceased all contact with her family.

Later in life Hegarty dedicated herself to helping her grandson Stanton LaVey's career. Her death preceded the death of Stanton LaVey (d. December 19, 2022) by five months. Hegarty-Hall also worked as a graphology specialist.

Preceded by Church Established	High Priestess of the Church of Satan; 1966–1984	Succeeded by Zeena Schreck (née LaVey) 1985–90
