= High and low magic =

High and low magic may refer to:

- High and low magic, theurgy and goetia or ceremonial magic and folk magic
- Greater and lesser magic, LaVeyan Satanic magic
