= Letters from the Devil =

- Author: Anton LaVey
- Language: English
- Series: United States
- Subject: Various
- Genre: News article
- Publisher: Underworld Amusements
- Publication date: 2010
- Pages: 72
- ISBN: 978-0557431731

Letters from the Devil: The Lost Writing of Anton Szandor LaVey is a volume composed of over 60 tabloid newspaper articles written by Anton LaVey, the founder of the Church of Satan. These were from the column of the same name in The National Insider.
