= Satanic magic =

Satanic magic may refer to:

- LaVeyan Satanic magic, also known as greater and lesser magic
- Theistic Satanic magic
- Satanische Magie (Satanic Magic), a 1983 book by Eugen Grosche
