= Karla LaVey =

Daughter of Anton LaVey

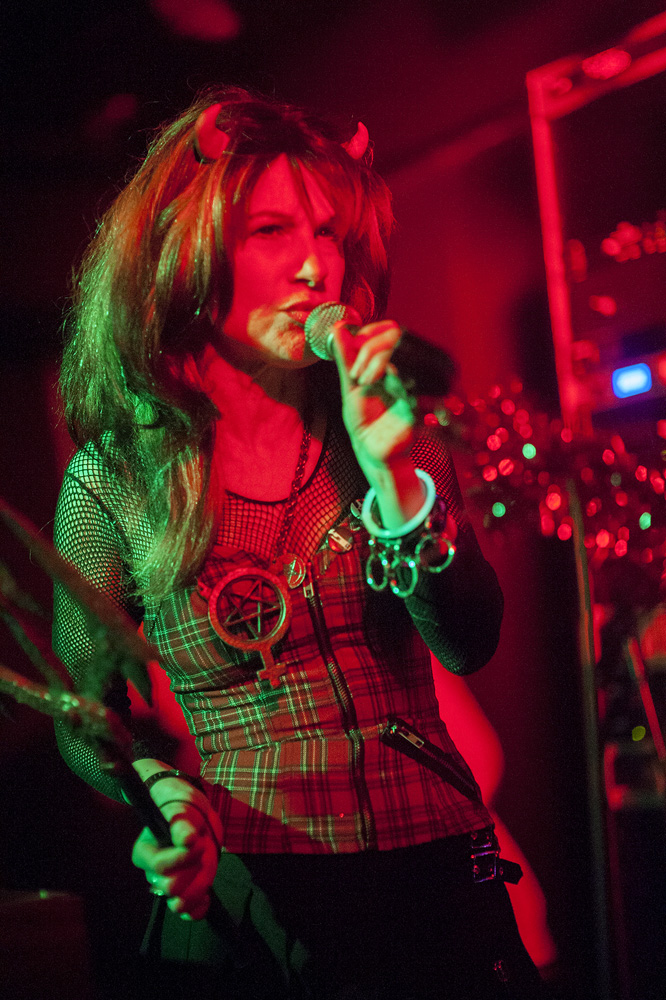
- LaVey at the 2012 Black X Mass show
- Born: Karla Maritza LaVey; July 31, 1952 (age 74); San Francisco, California, U.S.
- Occupations: Radio presenter, music impresario, religious leader, founder of First Satanic Church
- Years active: 1972–present
- Parent(s): Anton LaVey; Carole Lansing
- Relatives: Zeena Schreck (half-sister)

Karla Maritza LaVey (born July 31, 1952) is an American radio host, known for being the high priestess, founding member and administrator of the First Satanic Church in San Francisco, California, as well as being the eldest daughter of Anton LaVey, founder of the Church of Satan.

== Biography ==
Karla Maritza LaVey was born to Carole Lansing and Anton LaVey in San Francisco. She has two half siblings, Zeena Schreck and Satan Xerxes Carnacki LaVey. She was a founding member of her father's Church of Satan and acted as a public representative for both the church and her father.

In 1979, LaVey was dispatched to Amsterdam to oversee the International Church of Satan headquarters.

On October 29, 1997, Anton LaVey died of pulmonary edema. Being the next of kin to Anton LaVey, Karla held a press conference on November 7, 1997, to announce her father's death. Karla LaVey and Blanche Barton, Anton LaVey's companion, announced that they would run the Church of Satan jointly as co-high priestesses. Several days after Anton LaVey's death, Barton produced a handwritten will claiming that LaVey had left all of his belongings, property, writings, and royalties, including the Church of Satan, to Barton's toddler son who had been fathered by LaVey. The entire LaVey estate, Barton claimed, was to be put in a trust for the son, managed by Barton. Karla contested this will, and the San Francisco probate court subsequently decreed the will to be invalid.

In 1999, LaVey founded the First Satanic Church, headquartered in San Francisco.

Four years after the death of Anton LaVey, on October 31, 2001, a court settlement was reached in which Anton's belongings, intellectual property, and royalties would be split equally among his three children: Karla, Zeena, and LaVey's son by Barton (Satan Xerxes Carnacki LaVey). The settlement also stipulated that Barton would receive the "corporation known as Church of Satan".
