= The Satanic Bible =

1969 religious text of LaVeyan Satanism

- Author: Anton LaVey
- Language: English
- Series: United States
- Subjects: Satanism, magic
- Publisher: Avon Books
- Publication date: 1969
- Media type: Print
- Pages: 272
- ISBN: 978-0-380-01539-9
- Followed by: The Satanic Witch

The Satanic Bible is a collection of essays, observations, and rituals published by Anton LaVey in 1969. It is the central religious text of LaVeyan Satanism, and is considered the foundation of its philosophy and dogma. It has been described as the most important document to influence contemporary Satanism. Though The Satanic Bible is not considered to be sacred scripture in the way that the Christian Bible is to Christianity, LaVeyan Satanists regard it as an authoritative text as it is a contemporary text that has attained for them scriptural status. It extols the virtues of exploring one's nature and instincts. Believers have been described as "atheistic Satanists" because they believe that God and Satan are not external entities, but rather projections of an individual's personality—benevolent and stabilizing forces in their life. There have been thirty printings of The Satanic Bible, selling over a million copies.

The Satanic Bible is composed of four books: The Book of Satan, The Book of Lucifer, The Book of Belial, and The Book of Leviathan. The Book of Satan challenges the Ten Commandments and the Golden Rule, and promotes Epicureanism. The Book of Lucifer holds most of the philosophy in The Satanic Bible, with twelve chapters discussing topics such as indulgence, love, hate, and sex. LaVey also uses the book to dispel rumors surrounding the religion. In The Book of Belial, LaVey details rituals and magic. He discusses the required mindset and focus for performing a ritual, and provides instructions for three rituals: those for sex, compassion, or destruction. The Book of Leviathan provides four invocations for Satan, lust, compassion, and destruction. It also lists the nineteen Enochian Keys (adapted from John Dee's Enochian keys), provided both in Enochian and in English translation.

There have been both positive and negative reactions to The Satanic Bible. It has been described as "razor-sharp" and "influential". Criticism of The Satanic Bible stems both from qualms over LaVey's writing and the content itself. LaVey has been criticized for plagiarizing sections, and accusations have been made that his philosophies are largely borrowed. Attempts have been made to ban the book in schools, public libraries, and prisons, though these attempts are somewhat rare.

== History ==
There are multiple stories of the birth of The Satanic Bible. In the introduction to the 2005–present edition, High Priest Peter H. Gilmore describes LaVey as having compiled The Satanic Bible on his own from monographs he had written about the Church of Satan and its rituals. Gilmore lists a number of people who influenced LaVey's writings: Ayn Rand, Friedrich Nietzsche, H. L. Mencken, the members of the carnival with whom LaVey had supposedly worked in his youth, P. T. Barnum, Mark Twain, John Milton, and Lord Byron.

LaVey's daughter Zeena Schreck, in an exposé about both her father's religion and past, attributes the birth of The Satanic Bible to a suggestion by Peter Mayer, a publisher for Avon. According to Schreck, Mayer proposed that LaVey author a Satanic Bible to draw from the popularity of the 1968 horror film Rosemary's Baby, which had caused a recent rise in public interest in both Satanism and other occult practices. (Note: There is some disagreement over this claim: Gilmore states in the introduction that it was in fact LaVeyan Satanism that influenced Rosemary's Baby.) Schreck states that LaVey, aided by Diane Hegarty, compiled a number of writings he had already been distributing: an introduction to Satanism, a number of short essays, a guide to ritual magic, and pieces previously published in the Church of Satan bulletin The Cloven Hoof.

Either to meet length requirements set by the publisher or out of agreement with the ideas, LaVey and Hegarty borrowed heavily from writings by other authors. These included the 1890 social Darwinist book Might Is Right by Ragnar Redbeard, as well as Dee's Enochian keys from Aleister Crowley's The Equinox, modified to replace Christian references with Satanic alternates. Some accused LaVey of paraphrasing the Nine Satanic Statements from Rand's Atlas Shrugged without acknowledgement, though others maintain that LaVey was simply drawing inspiration from the novel. LaVey later affirmed the connection with Rand's ideas by stating that LaVeyan Satanism was "just Ayn Rand's philosophy, with ceremony and ritual added".

== Importance ==
The Satanic Bible has been described as the most important document to influence contemporary Satanism. The book contains the core principles of Satanism and is considered the foundation of its philosophy and dogma. Petersen noted that it is "in many ways the central text of the Satanic milieu", with Lap similarly testifying to its dominant position within the wider Satanic movement. David G. Bromley calls it "iconoclastic" and "the best-known and most influential statement of Satanic theology." Eugene V. Gallagher says that Satanists use LaVey's writings "as lenses through which they view themselves, their group, and the cosmos." He also states: "With a clear-eyed appreciation of true human nature, a love of ritual and pageantry, and a flair for mockery, LaVey's Satanic Bible promulgated a gospel of self-indulgence that, he argued, anyone who dispassionately considered the facts would embrace."

=== Publication history ===
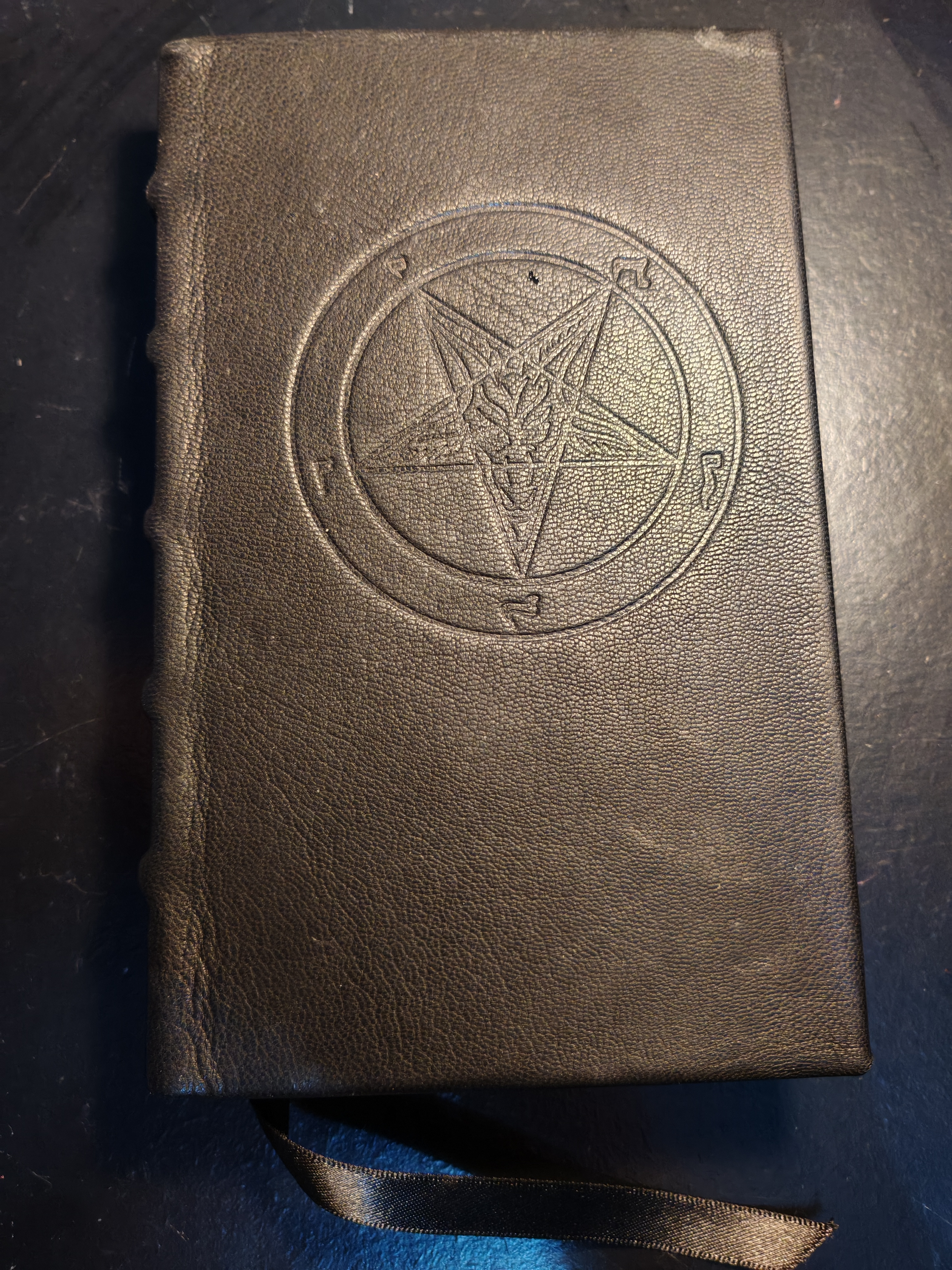
Leatherbound edition of The Satanic Bible, released by Avon Books in 2005.

Originally published in paperback by Avon in 1969, The Satanic Bible has had thirty printings and has never gone out of print. A hardcover edition was published by University Books that same year but has now been out of print for decades. In 2015, William Morrow published a new hardcover edition of the book combined in a single volume with its companion work, The Satanic Rituals, and marketed under a special arrangement by Rabid Crow Arts and Graphics. The main content has not changed throughout the editions, although the dedication was removed after several printings and the introduction has changed several times. The Sigil of Baphomet has been printed on the cover since the original publication. The Satanic Bible has sold over one million copies since its initial release. It has also been translated into Danish, Swedish, German, Spanish, Finnish and Turkish.

== Content ==
Some of the teachings of The Satanic Bible, according to The Washington Post, are

- "Hate your enemies with a whole heart, and if a man smite you on one cheek, SMASH him on the other";
- "Say unto thine own heart, 'I am mine own redeemer' ";
- "There is no heaven of glory bright, and no hell where sinners roast."

=== Dedication ===
Though it is no longer included in current printings of The Satanic Bible, early printings included an extensive dedication to various people whom LaVey recognized as influences. LaVey's primary dedication was to Bernardino Nogara (misprinted as "Logara"), Karl Haushofer, Grigori Rasputin, Basil Zaharoff, Alessandro Cagliostro, Barnabas Saul (John Dee's first scryer), Ragnar Redbeard, William Mortensen, Hans Brick, Max Reinhardt, Orrin Klapp, Fritz Lang, Friedrich Nietzsche, W. C. Fields, P. T. Barnum, Hans Poelzig, Reginald Marsh, Wilhelm Reich, and Mark Twain. The secondary dedication named Howard Hughes, James Moody, Marcello Truzzi, Adrian‐Claude Frazier, Marilyn Monroe, Wesley Mather, William Lindsay Gresham, Hugo Zacchini, Jayne Mansfield, Frederick Goerner, C. Huntley, Nathanael West, Horatio Alger Jr., Robert E. Howard, George Orwell, H. P. Lovecraft, Tuesday Weld, H. G. Wells, Sister Marie Koven, Harry Houdini, Togare (LaVey's pet lion), and the Nine Unknown Men from The Nine Unknown.

=== Introductions ===
Throughout the various printings of The Satanic Bible, it has included introductions by various authors. The first edition (in print from 1969 to 1972) included an excerpt from an article by Burton H. Wolfe, an investigative journalist and biographer of LaVey, entitled "The Church that Worships Satan". Wolfe provides an extensive biography of LaVey and a history of the Church of Satan. He mentions Rosemary's Baby as contributing to the popularity of Satanism, though he does not claim LaVeyan Satanism to have directly influenced its creation. From 1972 until 1976, the introduction to The Satanic Bible was a piece by Michael A. Aquino, who later went on to found the Temple of Set with a number of members of the Church of Satan. He gives a detailed analysis of the Satanic philosophies, and dispels myths about LaVeyan Satanism. He explains that it is not "devil worship", and that LaVeyan Satanists in fact reject the worship of external gods completely. He too provides a brief background on LaVey, explaining how LaVey brought some of the knowledge he had acquired while working with the circus to his religion. Wolfe again wrote the introduction for the 1976 to 2005 editions of The Satanic Bible. It included some of the same content as the 1969 version, with an expanded biography of LaVey and more information on the various conflicts between other religions and LaVeyan Satanism. Since 2005, The Satanic Bible has contained an introduction written by Gilmore, High Priest of the Church of Satan. In this introduction, he discusses his discovery of LaVeyan Satanism and his relationship with LaVey. He then goes on to provide a detailed biography of LaVey and addresses allegations that LaVey falsified much of the story of his own past. The introduction also provides a history of The Satanic Bible itself, as well as that of two other books by LaVey: The Satanic Witch and The Satanic Rituals.

=== Preface ===
LaVey explains his reasons for writing The Satanic Bible in a short preface. He speaks skeptically about volumes written by other authors on the subject of magic, dismissing them as "nothing more than sanctimonious fraud" and "volumes of hoary misinformation and false prophecy". He complains that other authors do no more than confuse the subject. He mocks those who spend large amounts of money on attempts to follow rituals and learn about the magic shared in other occult books. He also notes that many of the existing writings on Satanic magic and ideology were created by "right-hand path" authors. He tells that The Satanic Bible contains both truth and fantasy, and declares, "What you see may not always please you, but you will see!"

=== Prologue ===
The prologue to The Satanic Bible begins by discussing the concept of gods, good and evil, and human nature. It includes the Nine Satanic Statements:

1. Satan represents indulgence, instead of abstinence!
2. Satan represents vital existence, instead of spiritual pipe dreams!
3. Satan represents undefiled wisdom, instead of hypocritical self-deceit!
4. Satan represents kindness to those who deserve it, instead of love wasted on ingrates!
5. Satan represents vengeance, instead of turning the other cheek!
6. Satan represents responsibility to the responsible, instead of concern for psychic vampires!
7. Satan represents man as just another animal, sometimes better, more often worse than those that walk on all-fours, who, because of his "divine spiritual and intellectual development," has become the most vicious animal of all!
8. Satan represents all of the so-called sins, as they all lead to physical, mental, or emotional gratification!
9. Satan has been the best friend the church has ever had, as he has kept it in business all these years!

The Nine Satanic Statements outline the basic ideology of LaVeyan Satanism, and have become some of the guiding principles of LaVeyan Satanism. They also served as a template for later publications by LaVey, such as his 1987 "Nine Satanic Sins". He also inverts the typical blessings found in the Gospel of Matthew.

‘Blessed are the strong, for they shall possess the earth;
Cursed are the weak, for they shall inherit the yoke! . . .
Blessed are the iron-handed, for the unfit shall flee before them;
Cursed are the poor in spirit, for they shall be spat upon!’

=== The Book of Satan ===
Much of the first book of The Satanic Bible is taken from parts of Redbeard's Might Is Right, edited to remove racism, antisemitism, and misogyny. It challenges both the Ten Commandments and the Golden Rule, advocating instead a tooth-for-tooth philosophy. LaVey, through Redbeard, strongly advocates social Darwinism, saying, "Death to the weakling, wealth to the strong!" Humans are identified as instinctually predatory, and "lust and carnal desire" are singled out as part of humans' intrinsic nature. The Book of Satan suggests a hedonistic outlook, saying, "I break away from all conventions that do not lead to my earthly happiness." Indulgence is endorsed, and readers are encouraged to make the most of their lives. It criticizes both law and religious principles, instead suggesting doing only what makes one happy and successful. LaVey continues to denounce other religions, and he rails against what he considers to be arbitrary definitions of "good" and "evil". Religion is criticized as a man-made construct, and the reader is urged to question everything and destroy any lies that he or she uncovers. Long-standing lies that are believed to be irrefutable truths are identified as the most dangerous. The last part of The Book of Satan is an adaptation of the Christian Beatitudes, changed to reflect the principles of LaVeyan Satanism.

=== The Book of Lucifer ===
The Book of Lucifer contains the majority of the philosophy of The Satanic Bible. It details how Christianity has taught that God is good and Satan is evil, and presents an alternate view. It describes that the concept of Satan, used synonymously with "God", is different for each LaVeyan Satanist, but that to all it represents a good and steadying force in their life. Believers have been called "atheistic Satanists" because of this lack of belief in external gods, but others identify as antitheistic. Satan is seen to LaVeyan Satanists not as "an anthropomorphic being with cloven hooves, a barbed tail, and horns", but as a force of nature that has only been described as evil by other religions. Satan is viewed as a metaphor or a symbol, not as a being to be worshipped.

LaVey rejects the idea of prayer, instead urging Satanists to take action to fix a situation instead of asking for a solution. The seven deadly sins are advocated, on the basis that they all lead to personal pleasure. He says that Satanism is a form of "controlled selfishness", in the sense that doing something to help another will, in turn, make one happy. The Golden Rule is again mentioned, and LaVey suggests altering it from "Do unto others as you would have them do unto you" to "Do unto others as they do unto you" so that if someone is treated poorly, he or she can respond viciously. The Book of Lucifer also contains a list of "The Four Crown Princes of Hell" (Satan, Lucifer, Belial, and Leviathan) and of seventy-seven "Infernal Names", representations of Satan from various cultures and religions. They are the names that, according to LaVey, are most useful in Satanic rituals.

The Book of Lucifer contains a long chapter titled "Satanic Sex", discussing Satanism's view on sexual activity as well as misconceptions surrounding these views. He denies the belief that sex is the most important element in LaVeyan Satanism, and that participation in orgies or other promiscuous behavior is forced. He explains that sexual freedom is encouraged, but only in the sense that believers should be free to explore their own sexualities as they please, without harming others. Along with the rumors regarding Satanic views on sex, LaVey also addresses those about animal and human sacrifice. He explains that the only time a LaVeyan Satanist would perform a human sacrifice would be to accomplish two goals: to "release the magician's wrath" as he or she performed a curse, and to kill someone who deserved to die. He considers the action of hurting another person a request to be destroyed and explains that the Satanist is morally required to grant this request in the form of a curse. LaVey also says that a Satanist would never sacrifice a baby or an animal, as they are pure carnal beings and considered to be sacred. In The Book of Lucifer, LaVey outlines LaVeyan Satanism's views on death. He explains that one who has lived a full life will dread death and that this is the way it should be. He also does not agree with the idea of reincarnation. He encourages a strong will to live, comparing it to animals' instincts to fight viciously for their lives. Suicide is discouraged except in cases of euthanasia, where it would end extreme suffering. Because the Satanist is considered their own god, birthdays are celebrated as the most important holidays. Following one's birthday in importance are Walpurgisnacht and Halloween. Solstices and equinoxes are also celebrated.

=== The Book of Belial ===
The third book of The Satanic Bible describes rituals and magic. According to Joshua Gunn, these are adapted from books of ritual magic such as Crowley's Magick: Elementary Theory. The Satanic Rituals, published by LaVey in 1972, outlines the rituals more precisely, and contains the entire text of the Black Mass. LaVey begins The Book of Belial by defining magic as "The change in situations or events in accordance with one's will, which would, using normally accepted methods, be unchangeable." He explains that some of the rituals are simply applied psychology or science, but that some contain parts with no scientific basis.

LaVey explains that, in order to control a person, one must first attract their attention. He gives three qualities that can be employed for this purpose: sex appeal, sentiment (cuteness or innocence), and wonder. He also advocates the use of odor. In the Book of Belial, he discusses three types of rituals: those for sex, compassion, and destruction. Sex rituals work to entice another person; compassion rituals work to improve health, intelligence, success, and so on; destruction rituals work to destroy another person. LaVey advocates finding others with whom to practice Satanic rituals in order to reaffirm one's faith and avoid antisocial behavior. He particularly advocates group participation for destruction rituals, as compassion and sex rituals are more private in nature. LaVey goes on to list the key components to successful ritual: desire, timing, imagery, direction, and "The Balance Factor" (awareness of one's own limitations). Details for the various Satanic rituals are explained in The Book of Belial, and lists of necessary objects (such as clothing, altars, and the symbol of Baphomet) are given.

=== The Book of Leviathan ===
The final book of The Satanic Bible emphasizes the importance of spoken word and emotion to effective magic. An "Invocation to Satan" as well as three invocations for the three types of ritual are given. The "Invocation to Satan" commands the dark forces to grant power to the summoner, and lists the Infernal names for use in the invocation. The "Invocation employed towards the conjuration of lust" is used for attracting the attentions of another. Both male and female versions of the invocation are provided. The "Invocation employed towards the conjuration of destruction" commands the dark forces to destroy the subject of the invocation. The "Invocation employed towards the conjuration of compassion" requests protection, health, strength, and the destruction of anything ailing the subject of the invocation. The rest of The Book of Leviathan is composed of the Enochian Keys, which LaVey adapted from Dee's original work. They are given in Enochian and also translated into English. LaVey provides a brief introduction that credits Dee and explains some of the history behind the Enochian Keys and language. He maintains that the translations provided are an "unvarnishing" of the translations performed by the Hermetic Order of the Golden Dawn in the 1800s, but others accuse LaVey of simply changing references to Christianity with those to Satan.

== Themes ==
=== God and Satan ===
The Satanic Bible often uses the terms "God" and "Satan" interchangeably, except when referring to the concepts of these as viewed by other religions. LaVey also occasionally uses the term "God" to refer to other religions' views of God, and "Satan" or synonyms to refer to the idea of god as interpreted by LaVeyan Satanism, as when he writes, "When all religious faith in lies has waned, it is because man has become closer to himself and farther from 'God'; closer to the 'Devil.'" Throughout The Satanic Bible, the LaVeyan Satanist's view of god is described as the Satanist's true "self"—a projection of their own personality—not an external deity. Satan is used as a representation of personal liberty and individualism. Satan is also used as a metaphor for the ideas connected with the early Christian view of Satan or the serpent: wise, defiant, questioning, and free-thinking. LaVey discusses this extensively in The Book of Lucifer, explaining that the gods worshipped by other religions are also projections of man's true self. He argues that man's unwillingness to accept his own ego has caused him to externalize these gods so as to avoid the feeling of narcissism that would accompany self-worship.

If man insists on externalizing his true self in the form of "God," then why fear his true self, in fearing "God,"—why praise his true self in praising "God,"—why remain externalized from "God" in order to engage in ritual and religious ceremony in his name?
Man needs ritual and dogma, but no law states that an externalized god is necessary in order to engage in ritual and ceremony performed in a god's name! Could it be that when he closes the gap between himself and his "God" he sees the demon of pride creeping forth—that very embodiment of Lucifer appearing in his midst?

— Anton LaVey, The Satanic Bible, pp. 44–45

Though at some points LaVey refers to Satan as a physical being, this is intended to encourage the Satanist's "rational self-interest."

=== Science ===
Many of the ideas in The Satanic Bible suggest a secular, scientific view of the world. However, some of these ideas continue beyond present-day secularism by implying that various occult forces are not supernatural, but rather thus far undiscovered by science. These forces are said to be manipulable by the practitioner of LaVeyan Satanism, a trait of the religion that has been compared with Christian Science and Scientology.

James Lewis argues that scientific themes are so prevalent in The Satanic Bible because LaVey was appealing to the authority of science to legitimize Satanism as a religion.

=== Human nature and social Darwinism ===
Social Darwinism and the concept of "human nature" are ideas that are prevalent throughout The Satanic Bible. LaVey describes Satanism as "a religion based on the universal traits of man," and humans are described throughout as inherently carnal and animalistic. Each of the seven deadly sins is described as part of human's natural instinct, and are thus advocated. Social Darwinism is particularly noticeable in The Book of Satan, where LaVey plagiarizes portions of Redbeard's Might Is Right, though it also appears throughout in references to man's inherent strength and instinct for self-preservation. LaVeyan Satanism has been described as "institutionalism of Machiavellian self-interest" because of many of these themes.

== Influence ==
The Satanic Bible is recognized as one of the key texts of modern Satanism. The Church of Satan requires that people accept "LaVey's principles" before becoming members of the church. Many other Satanist groups and individual Satanists who are not part of the Church of Satan also recognize LaVey's work as influential. Many Satanists attribute their conversions or discoveries of Satanism to The Satanic Bible, with 20% of respondents to a survey by James Lewis mentioning The Satanic Bible directly as influencing their conversion. In Gilmore's introduction, he lists a number of novels and films supposedly influenced by The Satanic Bible and LaVeyan Satanism. These include the novels Rosemary's Baby by Ira Levin and Our Lady of Darkness by Fritz Leiber, as well as films such as Rosemary's Baby, The Devil's Rain, The Car, and Dr. Dracula. Others have lauded The Satanic Bible as heavily influential on metal and rock bands, such as Black Sabbath, Venom, Slayer, King Diamond, and Marilyn Manson.

== Reception ==
Richard Metzger describes The Satanic Bible as "a razor-sharp, no-bullshit primer in natural and supernatural law." David G. Bromley calls it "iconoclastic" and "the best-known and most influential statement of Satanic theology." Eugene V. Gallagher says that Satanists use LaVey's writings "as lenses through which they view themselves, their group, and the cosmos." He also states: "With a clear-eyed appreciation of true human nature, a love of ritual and pageantry, and a flair for mockery, LaVey's Satanic Bible promulgated a gospel of self-indulgence that, he argued, anyone who dispassionately considered the facts would embrace." The philosophy it presents has been described as "strident libertarianism" and "an obvious distillation of ideas common among members of the United States counter-culture in the 1960s." Joshua Gunn argues that the significance of The Satanic Bible as an occult item owes to its status as a "totem or a fetishized object in popular culture", not the philosophy contained within. He argues that many erroneously categorize the content of The Satanic Bible as evil and depraved from the minimalist, dark cover design (composed of a purple Sigil of Baphomet and white text on the front, and a photo of LaVey superimposed over the Sigil of Baphomet on the back), the verbose, overblown style of the text, and the presence of the word "Satan" in the title. Contrary to this belief, he says, the philosophy presented by LaVey is "neither offensive nor surprising."

Other observers have been more critical. Zeena Schreck has criticized The Satanic Bible as a financial endeavor suggested by Avon publisher, Mayer. She maintains that it contains large amounts of falsified information about LaVey's past, and that much of the book is plagiarized from Redbeard's Might Is Right, Dee's Enochian Keys, and Rand's Atlas Shrugged. Chris Mathews, in Modern Satanism: Anatomy of a Radical Subculture, describes The Satanic Bible as "hastily prepared" and cynical. Both Mathews and a 1971 article in Newsweek compare the ideologies presented in The Satanic Bible to Nazism: containing "unremitting focus on social elitism, appeals to force, and scorn for egalitarian principles". Israel Regardie criticized LaVey's alteration of the Enochian Keys in The Book of Leviathan as stupid and of lower quality than the original Keys. Gabriel Andrade calls LaVey's plagiarism "massive" and asserts that without it, the bible "would have fallen into oblivion."

The Satanic Bible has also received a large amount of criticism from people and organizations who find its content to be dangerous. Much of this criticism came during the period of "Satanic panic," when Satanic ritual abuse was feared to be epidemic. Much of this media coverage, however, has been denounced as "uncritical and sensationalized." Tom Harpur condemns the book as "blasphemous" and "socially seditious," and blames it for causing an increase in gruesome violence, ritual abuse, and other obscene acts. Critics have also accused The Satanic Bible of encouraging violence and murder, particularly in young people considered to be impressionable. Possession of The Satanic Bible has been used by some studies to identify adolescents who are antisocial, and some warn that possession of the book is a warning sign of emotional issues. The Council on Mind Abuse took a very negative view of The Satanic Bible. Former Executive Director Rob Tucker warned parents to look for The Satanic Bible in their children's bedrooms, saying, "You have to help the child fight this obsession like any other addiction" and "It's like giving drugs to a kid who is already on the edge." Attempts to ban the book from schools and public libraries have been made in various places around the world, and bans or limitations on the book in prisons have been repeatedly challenged in court. However, opposition to The Satanic Bible has rarely led to its removal; these bans are rare. The book was banned in South Africa from 1973 to 1993.

== See also ==
- The Synagogue of Satan

== Bibliography ==
- Abma, Derek (June 4, 2011). "Satanism isn't for devil worshippers, says Canadian researcher". Postmedia News.
- Ankarloo, Bengt; Clark, Stuart (1999). Witchcraft and Magic in Europe: The Twentieth Century. University of Pennsylvania Press. ISBN 978-0-8122-1707-0.
- Bogan, Jesse (August 9, 2011). "Inmate says rights were violated; Kevin Halfmann gets his day in court after an Illinois prison wouldn't let him have a copy of 'The Satanic Bible.'". St. Louis Post-Dispatch.
- Bromley, David G. (2005). "Satanism". In Lindsay Jones (ed.). Encyclopedia of Religion. Vol. 12 (2 ed.). Detroit, IL: Macmillan Reference USA.
- Brown, Louise (October 1, 1989). "Alarming number of teenagers drawn to Satanism, experts say". Toronto Star.
- Cavaglion, Gabriel; Sela-Shayovitz, Revital (December 2005). "The Cultural Construction of Contemporary Satanic Legends in Israel". Folklore. 116 (3): 255–271. doi:10.1080/00155870500282701. S2CID 161360139.
- Cope, Andrew Laurence (2010). Black Sabbath and the Rise of Heavy Metal Music. Farnham, Surrey: Ashgate Publishing Group. ISBN 978-0-7546-9990-3.
- Ellis, Bill (2000). Raising the Devil: Satanism, New Religions, and the Media. University Press of Kentucky, 2000. ISBN 978-0-8131-2170-3.
- Gallagher, Eugene V. (2005). "New Religious Movements: Scriptures of New Religious Movements". In Lindsay Jones (ed.). Encyclopedia of Religion. Vol. 12 (2 ed.). Detroit, IL: Macmillan Reference USA.
- Gallagher, Eugene V. (2013). "Sources, Sects, and Scripture: The Book of Satan in The Satanic Bible". In Per Faxneld and Jesper Aa. Petersen (ed.). The Devil's Party-Satanism in Modernity. Oxford University Press. pp. 103–122.
- Gunn, Joshua (2005). "Prime-time Satanism: Rumor-Panic and the Work of Iconic Topoi". Visual Communication. 4 (1): 93–120. doi:10.1177/1470357205048939. S2CID 144737058.
- Hallman, J.C. (2006). The Devil is a Gentleman: Exploring America's Religious Fringe. Random House. ISBN 978-1-4000-6172-3.
- Harpur, Tom (March 5, 1989). "A warning to all parents about another Satanic book". Toronto Star.
- Harvey, Graham (1995). "Satanism in Britain Today". Journal of Contemporary Religion. 10 (3): 283–296. doi:10.1080/13537909508580747. ISSN 1353-7903.
- Hughes, Kathryn (February 21, 2011). "There is no devil in Satanism". Atlanta Examiner.
- "Inmate sues over right to worship devil". Associated Press. May 28, 1990.
- Kajzer, Jackie; Lotring, Roger (2009). Full Metal Jackie Certified: The 50 Most Influential Heavy Metal Songs of the 80s and the True Stories Behind Their Lyrics. Boston, MA: Course Technology. ISBN 978-1-4354-5569-6.
- Lam, Tina (March 3, 1999). "Principal testifies on satanic prevention". Detroit Free Press.
- Lap, Amina Olander (2013). "Categorizing Modern Satanism: An Analysis of LaVey's Early Writings". In Per Faxneld; Jesper Aagaard Petersen (eds.). The Devil's Party: Satanism in Modernity. Oxford: Oxford University Press. pp. 83–102. ISBN 978-0-19-977924-6.
- LaVey, Anton Szandor (1969). The Satanic Bible. New York: Avon Books. ISBN 978-0-380-01539-9.
- ——— (1972) [1969]. The Satanic Bible. New York: Avon Books. ISBN 978-0-380-01539-9.
- ——— (1976) [1969]. The Satanic Bible. New York: Avon Books. ISBN 978-0-380-01539-9.
- ——— (2005) [1969]. The Satanic Bible. New York: Avon Books. ISBN 978-0-380-01539-9.
- Lewis, James R. (September 2002). "Diabolical Authority: Anton LaVey, The Satanic Bible and the Satanist "Tradition"". Marburg Journal of Religion. 7 (1): 1–16.
- ——— (2003). Legitimating New Religions. New Brunswick, NJ, USA: Rutgers University Press. ISBN 978-0-8135-3534-0.
- ——— (2001). Satanism Today: An Encyclopedia of Religion, Folklore, and Popular Culture. ABC-CLIO.
- Linedecker, Clifford L. (1991). Night Stalker. Macmillan. ISBN 978-0-312-92505-5.
- MacLeod, Ian (March 4, 1990). "Satanism; Teenage Satanists dabble with Devil". The Ottawa Citizen.
- Mathews, Chris (2009). Modern Satanism: Anatomy of a Radical Subculture. Greenwood Publishing Group. ISBN 978-0-313-36639-0.
- Metzger, Richard (2008). Book of Lies: The Disinformation Guide to Magic and the Occult. New York, NY: The Disinformation Company. ISBN 978-0-9713942-7-8.
- Moynihan, Michael; Søderlind, Didrik (2003). Lords of Chaos: The Bloody Rise of the Satanic Metal Underground. Los Angeles, CA: Feral House. ISBN 978-1-932595-52-9.
- Muzzatti, Stephen L. (2005). "Satanism". In Bosworth, Mary (ed.). Encyclopedia of Prisons and Correctional Facilities. Vol. 2. Thousand Oaks, CA: Sage Reference. pp. 874–876. ISBN 978-1-4129-2535-8.
- Partridge, Christopher (2006). The Re-Enchantment of the West, Vol 2: Alternative Spiritualities, Sacralization, Popular Culture and Occulture. T&T Clark. ISBN 978-0567041333.
- Petersen, Jesper Aagaard (2009). Contemporary Religious Satanism: a Critical Anthology. Ashgate Publishing, Ltd. ISBN 978-0-7546-5286-1.
- ——— (2013). "From Book to Bit: Enacting Satanism Online". In Egil Asprem; Kennet Granholm (eds.). Contemporary Esotericism. Durham: Acumen. pp. 134–158. ISBN 978-1-908049-32-2.
- "Prison inmate Ted Wentz sued state for return of confiscated Satanic Bible". USA Today. October 2, 1990.
- Redbeard, Ragnar (1927). Might is Right. Lulu.com. ISBN 978-1-4116-9858-1.
- Schreck, Zeena; Schreck, Nikolas (February 2, 1998). "Anton LaVey: Legend and Reality". Archived from the original on July 16, 2011.
- Steiger, Brad; Steiger, Sherry Hanson, eds. (2003). "Anton LaVey's First Church of Satan". The Gale Encyclopedia of the Unusual and Unexplained. Vol. 1. Detroit, Chicago: Cengage Learning. pp. 299–303. ISBN 978-0-7876-7764-0.
- Steinberg, Neil (September 21, 1986). "Rise in censorship puts readers in a bind". Chicago Sun-Times.
- Swatos, William H. (December 1992). "Adolescent Satanism: A Research Note on Exploratory Survey Data". Review of Religious Research. 34 (2). Religious Research Association: 161–169. doi:10.2307/3511132. JSTOR 3511132.
- Taub, Diane E.; Nelson, Lawrence D. (August 1993). "Satanism in Contemporary America: Establishment or Underground?". The Sociological Quarterly. 34 (3): 523–541. doi:10.1111/j.1533-8525.1993.tb00124.x.
- Versluis, Arthur (2006). The New Inquisitions: Heretic-Hunting and the Intellectual Origins of Modern Totalitarianism. Oxford University Press. ISBN 978-0-19-530637-8.
- Wright, Lawrence (1993). Saints & Sinners. New York: Alfred A. Knopf, Inc. ISBN 0-394-57924-0.
