= Greater and lesser magic =

System of magic in LaVeyan Satanism

Greater and lesser magic (known also as high and low magic or collectively Satanic magic), within LaVeyan Satanism, designate types of beliefs with the term greater magic applying to ritual practice meant as psychodramatic catharsis to focus one's emotions for a specific purpose and lesser magic applied to the practice of manipulation by means of applied psychology and glamour (or "wile and guile") to bend an individual or situation to one's will.

== Theory and definition ==
Outlined in The Satanic Bible, LaVey defined magic as "the change in situations or events in accordance with one's will, which would, using normally accepted methods, be unchangeable." This definition incorporates two broadly distinguished kinds of magic: greater and lesser. According to LaVey, one of the goals of ritual magic is "to isolate the otherwise dissipated adrenal and other emotionally induced energy, and to convert it into a dynamically transmittable force." LaVey defined lesser magic as "wile and guile obtained through various devices and contrived situations, which when utilized, can create change in accordance with one's will." Within this system of magic, the terms warlock and witch are most commonly used by, and to refer to, male and female practitioners, respectively.

LaVey espoused the view that there was an objective reality to magic, and that it relied upon natural forces that were yet to be discovered by science. Rather than characterising these as supernatural, LaVey expressed the view that they were part of the natural world. He believed that the successful use of magic involved the magician manipulating these natural forces using the force of their own willpower. LaVey also wrote of "the balance factor", insisting that any magical aims should be realistic. LaVey refused any division between black magic and white magic, attributing this dichotomy purely to the "smug hypocrisy and self-deceit" of those who called themselves "white magicians". Such neutrality correlates with LaVey's philosophical view of an impersonal, and therefore amoral, universe.

White magic is supposedly utilized only for good or unselfish purposes, and black magic, we are told, is used only for selfish or "evil" reasons. Satanism draws no such dividing line. Magic is magic, be it used to help or hinder. The Satanist, being the magician, should have the ability to decide what is just, and then apply the powers of magic to attain his goals.

— Anton LaVey

LaVey explains his reasons for writing The Satanic Bible in a short preface. He speaks skeptically about volumes written by other authors on the subject of magic, dismissing them as "nothing more than sanctimonious fraud" and "volumes of hoary misinformation and false prophecy." He complains that other authors do no more than confuse the subject. He mocks those who spend large amounts of money on attempts to follow rituals and learn about the magic shared in other occult books. He also notes that many of the existing writings on Satanic magic and ideology were created by "right-hand path" authors. He tells that The Satanic Bible contains both truth and fantasy, and declares, "What you see may not always please you, but you will see!" Much of LaVey's ideas on magic and ritual are outlined in The Satanic Bible. LaVey explains that some of the rituals are simply applied psychology or science, but that some contain parts with no scientific basis. The Satanic Rituals, published by LaVey in 1972, outlines the rituals more precisely. The third book of The Satanic Bible describes rituals and magic. According to Joshua Gunn, these are adapted from books of ritual magic such as Crowley's Magick: Elementary Theory.

== Greater magic ==
Greater magic is a ritual performed in order to focus one's emotional energy for a specific purpose. These rites are based on three major psycho-emotive themes, including compassion (love), destruction (hate), and sex (lust). These rituals are often considered to be magical acts, with LaVey's Satanism encouraging the practice of magic to aid one's selfish ends. Much of Satanic ritual is designed for an individual to carry out alone; this is because concentration is seen as key to performing magical acts. The ritual is referred to as an "intellectual decompression chamber", where skepticism and disbelief are willfully suspended, thus allowing the magicians to fully express their mental and emotional needs, holding back nothing regarding their deepest feelings and desires. LaVey listed the key components to successful ritual as: desire, timing, imagery, direction. LaVeyan rituals sometimes include anti-Christian blasphemies, which are intended to have a liberating effect on the participants. In some of the rituals, a naked woman serves as the altar; in these cases it is made explicit that the woman's body itself becomes the altar, rather than have her simply lying on an existing altar. There is no place for sexual orgies in LaVeyan ritual. Neither animal nor human sacrifice takes place. Children are banned from attending these rituals, with the only exception being the Satanic Baptism, which is specifically designed to involve infants.

Details for the various Satanic rituals are explained in The Book of Belial, and lists of necessary objects (such as clothing, altars, and the symbol of Baphomet) are given. LaVey described a number of rituals in his book, The Satanic Rituals; these are "dramatic performances" with specific instructions surrounding the clothing to be worn, the music to be used, and the actions to be taken. This attention to detail in the design of the rituals was intentional, with their pageantry and theatricality intending to engage the participants' senses and aesthetic senses at various levels and enhancing the participants' willpower for magical ends. LaVey prescribed that male participants should wear black robes, while older women should wear black, and other women should dress attractively in order to stimulate sexual feelings among many of the men. All participants are instructed to wear amulets of either the upturned pentagram or the image of Baphomet. According to LaVey's instructions, on the altar is to be placed an image of Baphomet. This should be accompanied by various candles, all but one of which are to be black. The lone exception is to be a white candle, used in destructive magic, which is kept to the right of the altar. Also to be included are a bell which is rung nine times at the start and end of the ceremony, a chalice made of anything but gold, and which contains an alcoholic drink symbolizing the "Elixir of Life", a sword that represents aggression, a model phallus used as an aspergillum, a gong, and parchment on which requests to Satan are to be written before being burned. Although alcohol was consumed in the Church's rites, drunkenness was frowned upon and the taking of illicit drugs was forbidden.

The final book of The Satanic Bible emphasizes the importance of spoken word and emotion to effective magic. An "Invocation to Satan" as well as three invocations for the three types of ritual are given. The "Invocation to Satan" commands the dark forces to grant power to the summoner, and lists the Infernal names for use in the invocation. The "Invocation employed towards the conjuration of lust" is used for attracting the attentions of another. Both male and female versions of the invocation are provided. The "Invocation employed towards the conjuration of destruction" commands the dark forces to destroy the subject of the invocation. The "Invocation employed towards the conjuration of compassion" requests protection, health, strength, and the destruction of anything ailing the subject of the invocation. The rest of The Book of Leviathan is composed of the Enochian Keys, which LaVey adapted from Dee's original work. They are given in Enochian and also translated into English. LaVey provides a brief introduction that credits Dee and explains some of the history behind the Enochian Keys and language. He maintains that the translations provided are an "unvarnishing" of the translations performed by the Hermetic Order of the Golden Dawn in the 1800s, but others accuse LaVey of simply changing references to Christianity with those to Satan.

In designing these rituals, LaVey drew upon a variety of older sources, with scholar of Satanism Per Faxneld noting that LaVey "assembled rituals from a hodgepodge of historical sources, literary as well as esoteric". LaVey openly toyed with the use of literature and popular culture in other rituals and ceremonies, thus appealing to artifice, pageantry, and showmanship. For instance, he published an outline of a ritual which he termed the "Call to Cthulhu" which drew upon the stories of the alien god Cthulhu authored by American horror writer H. P. Lovecraft. In this rite, set to take place at night in a secluded location near to a turbulent body of water, a celebrant takes on the role of Cthulhu and appears before the assembled Satanists, signing a pact between them in the language of Lovecraft's fictional "Old Ones".

== Lesser magic ==
"The antiquated meaning of 'glamour' is witchcraft. The most important asset to the modern witch is her ability to be alluring, to utilize glamour. The word 'fascination' has a similarly occult origin. Fascination was the term applied the evil eye. To fix a person's gaze, in other words, fascinate, was to curse them with the evil eye. Therefore, if a woman had the ability to fascinate men, she was regarded as a witch." - Anton LaVey

— Michael Moynihan, "Infernal Impact: The Command to Look as a Formula for Satanic Success"

Lesser magic, also referred to as "everyday" or "situational" magic, is the practice of manipulation by means of applied psychology. LaVey wrote that a key concept in lesser magic is the "command to look", which can be accomplished by utilizing elements of "sex, sentiment, and wonder", in addition to the utilization of looks, body language, scents, color, patterns, and odor. LaVey wrote that the terms "fascination" and "glamour" have origins in the world of "coercive" magic. The word "fascination" comes from the Latin word "fascinare", which means "to cast a spell upon". This system encourages a form of manipulative role-play, wherein the practitioner may alter several elements of their physical appearance in order to aid them in seducing or "bewitching" an object of desire.

LaVey developed "The Synthesizer Clock", the purpose of which is to divide humans into distinct groups of people based primarily on body shape and personality traits. The synthesizer is modeled as a clock, and based on concepts of somatotypes. The clock is intended to aid a witch in identifying themselves, subsequently aiding in utilizing the "attraction of opposites" to "spellbind" the witch's object of desire by assuming the opposite role. The successful application of lesser magic is said to be built upon one's understanding of their place on the clock. Upon finding your position on the clock, you are encouraged to adapt it as seen fit, and perfect your type by harmonizing its element for better success. LaVey explains that, in order to control a person, one must first attract his or her attention. He gives three qualities that can be employed for this purpose: sex appeal, sentiment (cuteness or innocence), and wonder. He also advocates the use of odor.

Dyrendal referred to LaVey's techniques as "Erving Goffman meets William Mortensen". Drawing insights from psychology, biology, and sociology, Petersen noted that lesser magic combines occult and "rejected sciences of body analysis [and] temperaments."

== Ritual and ceremonial rites ==
In the Book of Belial, he discusses three types of rituals: lust rituals which work to entice another person, destruction rituals to destroy another person and compassion rituals to improve health, intelligence, success. Lust rituals are designed to attract the desired romantic or sexual partner and can involve masturbation, with orgasm as the goal. Destruction rituals are designed to do harm to others and involve the symbolic annihilation of an enemy through the use of "vicarious" human sacrifice often involving a customized effigy representing the intended victim which is then put through ritual fire, smashing, or other representation of obliteration. Compassion rituals are designed with the intent of helping people (including oneself), to evoke overwhelming pathos or sadness, and crying is strongly encouraged.

In The Satanic Rituals, LaVey makes a distinction between the ritual and the ceremony, stating that rituals "...are directed for a specific end that the performer desires", and that ceremonies are "...pageants paying homage to or commemorating an event, aspect of life, admired personage, or declaration of faith [...] a ritual is used to attain, while a ceremony serves to sustain". LaVey emphasized that in his tradition, Satanic rites came in two forms, neither of which were acts of worship; in his terminology, "rituals" were intended to bring about change, whereas "ceremonies" celebrated a particular occasion.

A satanic baptism is a ceremony for a child is intended to be a symbolic recognition of the infant as being born a Satanist and is only to be performed for those under the age of four, as LaVey claimed that beyond this age, the child has already begun to be influenced by "alien" ideas. Adult baptisms serve as a declaration of "faith", where "falsehoods, hypocrisy and shame of the past" are symbolically cast away. In 1967, LaVey performed the first publicly recorded Satanic baptism in history for his youngest daughter Zeena, which garnered worldwide publicity and was originally recorded on The Satanic Mass LP. The Satanic Baptisms were written by LaVey and published in The Satanic Rituals.

In February 1967, LaVey officiated the first Satanic wedding, the much publicized marriage of Judith Case and journalist John Raymond. The first Satanic funeral was for U.S. naval machinist-repairman, third-class, and Church of Satan member Edward Olsen. It was performed by LaVey at the request of Olsen's wife, complete with a chrome-helmeted honor guard. Both ceremonies were written by LaVey, but were never officially published until 2007, when The Satanic Scriptures released to the public an adapted version of them by the current High Priest of the Church, Peter H. Gilmore.

Along with the wedding and funeral ceremonies, Gilmore's The Satanic Scriptures also published a minor rite of dedication of ceremonial objects, which satirizes the 'cleasing' rituals of other religions, and the Ragnarök Rite, a ritual written by Gilmore in the 1980's inspired by the ancient Norse myth of Ragnarök intended to purge its participants from the anguish and hatred aroused after being victim of religious fanaticism.

== The Black Mass ==
LaVey also developed his own Black Mass, which was designed as a form of deconditioning to free the participant from any inhibitions that they developed living in Christian society. He noted that in composing the Black Mass rite, he had drawn upon the work of Charles Baudelaire and Joris-Karl Huysmans.

== Symbolism ==
=== Four Crown Princes of Hell ===
LaVey utilized the symbolism of the Four Crown Princes of Hell in The Satanic Bible, with each chapter of the book being named after each Prince. The Book of Satan: The Infernal Diatribe, The Book of Lucifer: The Enlightenment, The Book of Belial: Mastery of the Earth, and The Book of Leviathan: The Raging Sea. This association was inspired by the demonic hierarchy from The Book of the Sacred Magic of Abra-Melin the Mage.

- Satan (Hebrew) "Lord of the Inferno":

The adversary, representing opposition, the element of fire, the direction of the south, and the Sigil of Baphomet during ritual.

- Lucifer (Roman) "The Morning Star":

The bringer of light, representing pride and enlightenment, the element of air, the direction of the east, and candles during ritual.

- Belial (Hebrew) "Without a Master":

The baseness of the earth, independence and self-sufficiency, the element of earth, the direction of the north, and the sword during ritual.

- Leviathan (Hebrew) "Serpent of the Abyss":

The great dragon, representing primal secrecy, the element of water, the direction of the west, and the chalice during ritual.

=== Phrases ===
"Hail Satan" a common greeting and ritual term in the Church of Satan, both in its English form, Hail Satan, as well as in the original Latin version of it, Ave Satanas. When Ave Satanas is used, it is often preceded by the term Rege Satanas ("Reign, Satan"). (Rege Satanas can be heard in the video of a widely publicized Church of Satan wedding performed by LaVey on February 1, 1967.) The combination "Rege Satanas, Ave Satanas, Hail Satan!" is found as a greeting in early Church of Satan correspondence, as well as in their 1968 recording The Satanic Mass, and ultimately in their 1969 book The Satanic Bible. The phrase is used in some versions of the Black Mass, where it often accompanies the phrase Shemhamforash and is said at the end of each prayer. This rite was performed by the Church of Satan appearing in the documentary Satanis in 1969.

== See also ==
- Psychological theories of magic
- Satanic ritual abuse – Widespread moral panic alleging abuse
