= Strange Music (album) =

Studio album by Anton LaVey
- Released: 1994
- Recorded: San Francisco
- Genres: Traditional pop, lo-fi, outsider music
- Length: 24:14
- Label: Amarillo
- Producers: Becky Wilson, Gregg Turkington

Strange Music is an album by Anton LaVey released in 1994 through Amarillo Records.

LaVey's then-wife, Blanche Barton contributed vocals on "Start the Day Right" and "Gloomy Sunday".

== Track listing ==
No.	Title	Length
1.	"Thanks for the Memory"	3:42
2.	"Strange Music"	3:18
3.	"Temptation"	5:05
4.	"Start the Day Right"	1:46
5.	"One for My Baby (and One More for the Road)"	3:57
6.	"The Year of Julibo"	1:54
7.	"Gloomy Sunday"	4:32
