= The Satanic Rituals =

Book by Anton Szandor LaVey

- Cover of the Avon Books edition
- Author: Anton LaVey
- Language: English
- Subjects: Greater magic Satanism
- Published: 1972
- Publisher: Avon Books
- Publication place: United States
- Media type: Print (Hardcover & paperback)
- Pages: 224
- Followed by: The Satanic Witch

The Satanic Rituals is a book by Anton Szandor LaVey, published in 1972 by Avon Books as a companion volume to The Satanic Bible. The book outlines nine rituals and ceremonies intended for group performance, with an introductory essay to each. Some of the rites presented are inspired by other groups, such as the Yezidis, the Freemasons, the Knights Templar and the Order of the Illuminati, and some are inspired by fictional works, such as the writings of H.P. Lovecraft.

The book includes the child baptism ritual LaVey used for his youngest daughter Zeena at the first publicly recorded Church of Satan baptism.

== Rites outlined ==
- Le Messe Noire
- The Ceremony of the Stifling Air
- Das Tirdrama
- Die elektrischen Vorspiele
- Homage to Tchort
- The Statement of Shaitan and Wordless Rite of Dedication
- The Ceremony of the Nine Angles
- The Call to Cthulhu
- The Baptisms: Adult Rite and Children's Ceremony
