= Satanism Today =

2001 book by James R. Lewis

- Cover
- Editor: James R. Lewis
- Language: English
- Subject: Satanism
- Publisher: ABC-Clio
- Publication date: 2001
- Publication place: United States
- Media type: Print (hardcover)
- Pages: 371
- ISBN: 1-57607-292-4
- OCLC: 47844717
- Dewey Decimal: 133.42203
- LC Class: BF1548 .L49 2001

Satanism Today: An Encyclopedia of Religion, Folklore, and Popular Culture is a 2001 encyclopedia on Satanism. It was written and edited by James R. Lewis and published by ABC-Clio. It focuses on the figure of the Devil and its influence on human society. The book primarily takes a focus on pop cultural influence of Satanism and the figure of the Devil. It contains about 300 entries on topics related to Satanism, including groups, people, concepts, and media portrayals. Satanism Today received positive reviews, with praise for its neutral and scholarly coverage, and its appendixes.

== Background and publication history ==
Satanism Today was edited and written by James R. Lewis, an American scholar of religious studies and new religious movements. At the time of the book's publication, Lewis taught religious studies at University of Wisconsin–Stevens Point. He had authored a number of other books on religious movements and other fringe phenomena, including The Encyclopedia of Cults, Sects and New Religions. Satanism Today was first published by ABC-Clio in 2001 in a 371-page hardcover edition.

== Contents ==
Satanism Today focuses on "contemporary images of the Devil"; in an introduction, Lewis argues that the devil has come to represent more than pure evil and has a wide-ranging influence on popular culture, and seeks to analyze the role of the Devil and Satanism in modern pop culture as well as its roots and religious practices. Due to the broad scope of the "Satanic", Satanism Today is largely focused on popular culture in the contemporary world rather than more formal theological discussion, though theological topics are covered. The main focus is on the image of Satan and its many, frequently contradictory, facets. Its focus is mostly on Satan in Abrahamic religions but also has discussion of demons in other faiths.

Satanism Today contains about 300 articles in dictionary format. The book is in two column format, and entries range widely in size from a few sentences to multiple pages. Some entries have see also sections and many have further reading; some entries include photographs. It contains entries on a number of Satanic groups, both theistic and non-theistic Satanist ones. It also lists the web addresses of the groups profile due to the prominence of satanism on the internet.

It covers Satanic symbols, beliefs, beings, people associated with Satanism, specific hells, concepts associated with Satanism, and individual media portrayals and influences. People covered include Satanists and occultists like Anton LaVey and Aleister Crowley, but also Shakespeare. It includes entries on figures associated with Satanism, like the cult leader Charles Manson and the Satanic serial killer Richard Ramirez. The book surveys Satanic themes in films and in modern literature, as well as perceptions or actual themes like in the tabletop RPG game Dungeons & Dragons and in heavy metal music. A particular focus is the debunking and moral panic of satanic ritual abuse. Non-strictly Satanist organizations covered in the book include the occult organization Ordo Templi Orientis, the Christian publisher Chick Publications, and the motorcycle club Hells Angels.

It includes appendixes, a bibliography, and an index. There are three appendixes: 1 of sample documents from writings from Satanists, the next the 1992 FBI study debunking the concept of Satanic ritual abuse, and finally Lewis's survey of Satanists. Preceding the appendixes there is a chronology of Satanism.

== Reception ==
Satanism Today received praise for its neutrality and scholarly coverage of a frequently sensational topic. Booklist praised the book as "remarkably evenhanded", recommending it for academic and large public libraries. William P. Collins writing for Library Journal complimented the book as the "first thoroughgoing study" of modern Satanism, praising it for its lack of sensationalism and for its "scholarly and reasonable objective assessments". He wrote that it would be useful to scholars and recommended the book to both public and academic libraries. He judged the entries on Chick Publications, Dungeons & Dragons, and backmasking to be especially interesting, and praised the book's coverage of the debunking of the Satanic ritual abuse concept. He questioned the inclusion of an entry on runes, which he said seemed tangential, and wondered about the absence of the popular demon-related television show Buffy the Vampire Slayer. Booklist noted a few errors but judged the volume overall as useful, particularly for its bibliography, neutrality, and its appendixes; they wrote that the FBI report and the survey included were themselves "almost worth the price of the book".

Collins compared it in terms of scope to the book Raising Hell by Michael Newton, though noted that one to be heavier on the crime and described it as less current than Lewis's volume. G. Woods, writing for Choice magazine, highly recommended Satanism Today for both specialist and general collections. He praised its tone as "scholarly and informative" with "clear and precise" entries, also complimenting the bibliography, selections of further readings, and index. Tom Gilson writing for Against the Grain described its subject matter as "compelling" and described its focus as the contradictory and varying portraits of Satan within society in its "diversity and pervasiveness"; he wrote that it "brings home the fascination with Satanic imagery in human culture", recommending it for public and some academic libraries.
