= Peter H. Gilmore =

American LaVeyan Satanist writer (born 1958)

Peter Howard Gilmore
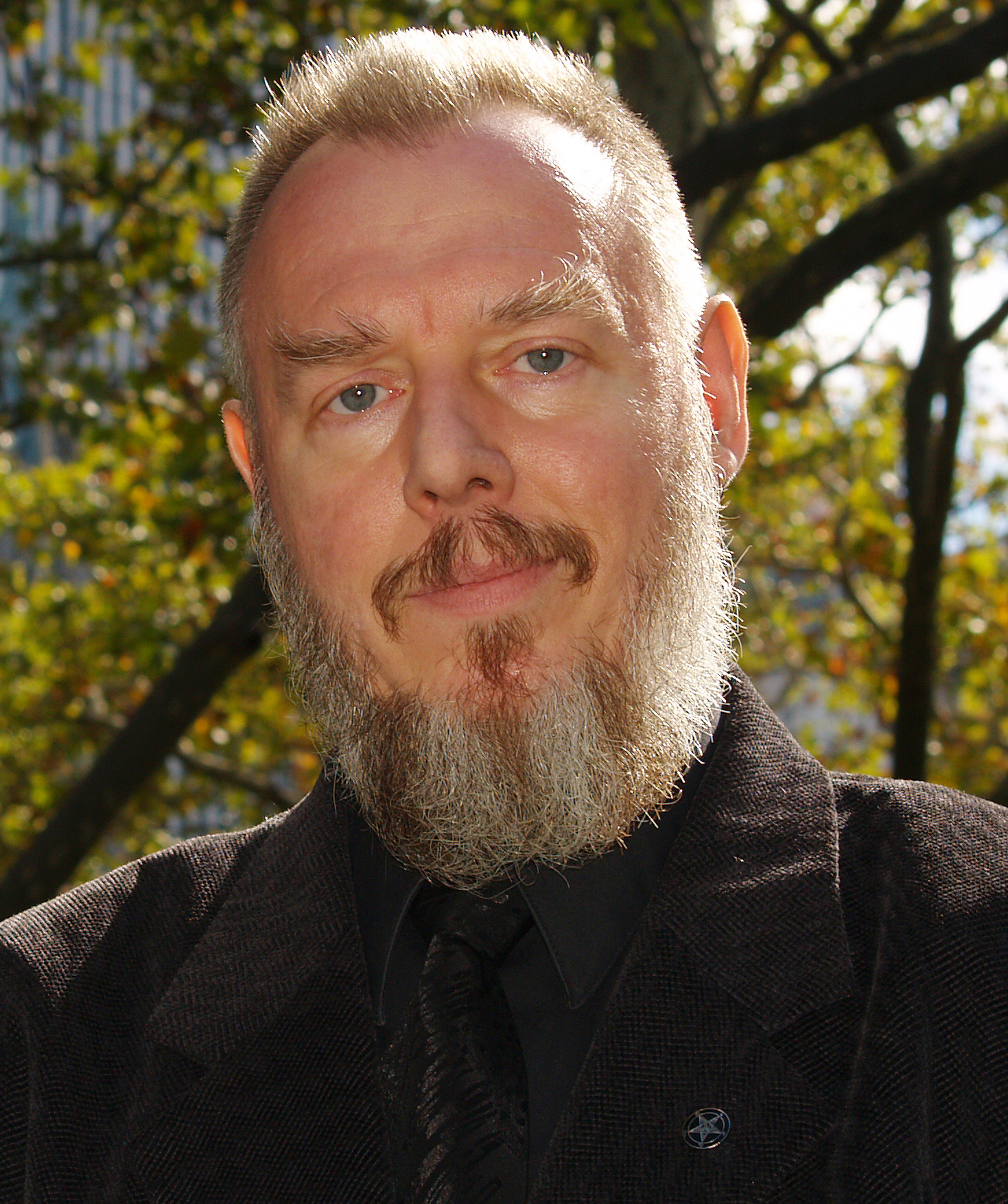
- Gilmore in October 2007
- Title: High Priest; Magus

Personal life
- Born: Peter Howard Gilmore; May 24, 1958 (age 68) New York, U.S.
- Spouse: Peggy Nadramia
- Education: New York University (BS, MA)
- Known for: The Satanic Scriptures

Religious life
- Religion: LaVeyan Satanism
- Denomination: Church of Satan
- Profession: Priest, writer

Peter Howard Gilmore (born May 24, 1958) is an American writer and LaVeyan Satanist. He is the current High Priest of the Church of Satan, and was appointed to the position after the death of Church of Satan founder Anton LaVey. As a representative of the Church of Satan, Gilmore has been interviewed on numerous television and radio programs dealing with the topic of Satanism, including appearances on History, the BBC, Syfy, Point of Inquiry, and Bob Larson's Christian radio show.

== Biography ==
Gilmore was raised in upstate New York. He read The Satanic Bible at age thirteen and has described The Church of Satan as "the motivating philosophical force in my life" ever since.

He and his wife Peggy Nadramia published a Satanic journal, The Black Flame, from 1989 to 2005. In 2005, Gilmore wrote the new introduction to Anton LaVey's The Satanic Bible, and his essay on Satanism was published in The Encyclopedia of Religion and Nature.

=== The Satanic Scriptures ===
A hardcover edition of The Satanic Scriptures, a collection of essays and other writings by Gilmore, was released on Walpurgis Night of 2007, with a subsequent paperback edition (ISBN 0976403595) released on October 13, 2007. The book includes rituals that were previously not public, such as marriages and Satanic burials.

Religious titles
Preceded by Anton LaVey, then vacancy	High Priest of the Church of Satan; 2001-present	Succeeded by Current incumbent
