= Peggy Nadramia =

American editor and administrator

Maga Nadramia Peggy Nadramia
- Title: High Priestress, Church of Satan

Personal life
- Born: Margaret Nadramia
- Spouse: Peter H. Gilmore

Religious life
- Religion: Satanism
- Denomination: Church of Satan
- Profession: Magazine editor, administrator

Peggy Nadramia (born Margaret Nadramia) is an American magazine editor and administrator in the Church of Satan, of which she is the current High Priestess, and in which she is known as Maga Nadramia, as well as the wife of current church head Peter H. Gilmore.

== Works ==
- Narcopolis & Other Poems edited by Peggy Nadramia (Hell's Kitchen Productions, ISBN 0-9623286-1-8, Nov 1989); an anthology of macabre poetry with illustrations by several artists.

She was also editor of the influential little magazine of horror fiction and related matter, Grue, 1985–1999.

== See also ==
- Satanism: An interview with Church of Satan High Priest Peter Gilmore

Preceded by Blanche Barton	High Priestess of the Church of Satan; 2002- Present	Succeeded by Current incumbent
