= The Devil's Notebook =

1992 book by Anton Szandor LaVey

- Author: Anton LaVey
- Language: English
- Series: United States
- Subject: Social commentary
- Publisher: Feral House
- Publication date: 1992
- Media type: Print
- Pages: 147
- ISBN: 0922915113

The Devil's Notebook is the fourth book by Anton LaVey, published in 1992 by Feral House. It includes a foreword by Adam Parfrey and design by Sean Tejaratchi. The book contains forty-one essays in which LaVey provides commentary on such topics as nonconformity, occult faddism, Nazism, terrorism, cannibalism, erotic politics, the “Goodguy badge”, demoralization and the construction of artificial human companions. Included are instructions for the creation of what LaVey terms "total environments", or places of magical evocation, where the enlightened may escape the deleterious effects of contemporary existence.
