= Satanis =

- Directed by: Ray Laurent
- Produced by: Ray Laurent
- Starring: Anton LaVey
- Cinematography: Richard Eisman; Carlon Tanner
- Edited by: Sean Erik
- Music by: Anton LaVey
- Distributed by: Sherpix
- Release date: March 1970
- Running time: 86 minutes
- Country: United States
- Language: English

Satanis: The Devil's Mass is a 1970 American documentary film about Anton LaVey and the Church of Satan. It was directed and produced by Ray Laurent and released by Something Weird Video on 17 June 2003. Filmed in San Francisco, California, the film is a compilation of ritual footage and interviews with LaVey's family, neighbors, and church members, as well as Christian priests and Mormon missionaries. Display ads at theater showings read: "Satanis is the most pertinent, and perhaps the most shocking film of our time. But it’s definitely not a movie for everyone. If you choose not to see it, we will understand.”
