= William Mortensen =

American photographer (1897–1965)

- Born: William Herbert Mortensen; January 27, 1897; Park City, Utah
- Died: August 12, 1965 (aged 68); Laguna Beach, California
- Resting place: Fairhaven Memorial Park
- Occupation: Glamour photographer
- Spouses: Courtney Crawford (married 1924 – c. 1926); Myrdith Monaghan (married 1935)

William Herbert Mortensen (January 27, 1897 – August 12, 1965) was an American glamour photographer, primarily known for his Hollywood portraits in the 1920s–1940s in the Pictorialist style.

== Early life ==
Mortensen was born on January 27, 1897, in Park City, Utah, the son of Danish immigrants Agnes and William Peter Mortensen, who had immigrated from Copenhagen, Denmark in 1883.

Before serving in World War I, Mortensen graduated from East Side High School in Salt Lake City. He then served as Private in Company D of the 13th Regiment of the United States Infantry from August 6, 1918, to May 16, 1919. At his enlistment, he recorded his occupation as painting.

After his discharge from the army, Mortensen briefly studied illustration at the Art Students League in New York City.

In May 1920 he traveled in Greece, Italy, Egypt and Constantinople to "sketch for educational purposes". He returned to Utah, then traveled to Hollywood as an escort for his friend's sister, Fay Wray. After two years at the Art Students League he was declared to have "no talent for drawing". Undeterred by this verdict he borrowed money and took off for Greece, to make etchings of the monuments of ancient Attica.

== Career ==
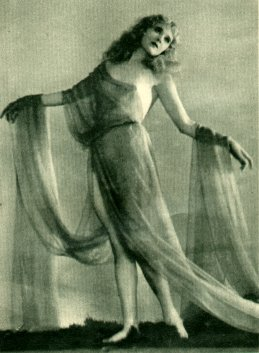
Actress Margaret Livingston, photographed by Mortensen (1927)

Mortensen was a very self-critical man who began his photographic career taking portraits of Hollywood actors and film stills. During the 1920s and 1930s, he was inspired by horror films being adapted in studios, and ended up making portraits about them in his own style. His favorite photographic topics were of witches, dancers, demons, peasants, and Shakespearean actors.

In 1931 he moved to the artist community of Laguna Beach, California, where he opened a studio and the William Mortensen School of Photography.

Working in the Pictorialist style, he manipulated photographs using pens, paints, pumice and razor blades to produce romanticist painting-like effects. Mortensen's style of art consisted of him using a bromoil process. The style brought him criticism from straight photographers of the modern realist movement and, in particular, he carried on a prolonged written debate with Ansel Adams in the pages of Camera Craft magazine.

His arguments defending romanticist photography led him to be "ostracized from most authoritative canons of photographic history". In an essay, Larry Lytle wrote, "Due to his approach—both technically and philosophically in opposition to straight or purist adherents—he is amongst the most problematic figures in photography in the twentieth-century ... historians and critics have described his images as "... anecdotal, highly sentimental, mildly erotic hand-colored prints ...", "... bowdlerized versions of garage calendar pin-ups and sadomasochist entertainments ...", "... contrived set-ups and sappy facial expressions ...", and Ansel Adams variously referred to Mortensen as the "Devil", and "the anti-Christ". In addition, the more realistic photojournalism emerging from World War II correspondents, and carried in national newsmagazines, caused Mortensen's more posed and contrived photos to fade from the public mind. He was largely forgotten by the time of his death in 1965.

Recent years have brought praise for Mortensen's development of manipulation techniques and a renewed interest in his work. In 2013, one of Mortensen's students, portrait photographer Robert Balcomb, published a book—Me and Mortensen—about his time studying with Mortensen in Laguna Beach.

He wrote nine books about technique in photography in conjunction with George Dunham.

Mortensen was awarded the Hood medal from the Royal Photographic Society in 1949.

== Works ==
In order of original publication date except where noted. Mortensen's name is omitted when he was the sole author.

- Projection Control. San Francisco, CA, USA: Camera Craft Pub. Co. 1934. hdl:2027/mdp.39015033402630. OCLC 567991261 – via Internet Archive.
- Monsters and Madonnas. San Francisco, CA, USA: Camera Craft Pub. Co. 1973 [1934]. ISBN 9780405049279. OCLC 643549864, 643549864 – via Internet Archive.
- Pictorial Lighting. San Francisco, Calif., Camera craft publishing company. 1935. OCLC 42857350 – via Internet Archive.
- The Command to Look: A Formula for Picture Success. San Francisco, CA, USA: Camera Craft Pub. Co. 1937. OCLC 872528013.
  - Revised Mortensen, William; Dunham, George; Lytle, Larry; Moynihan, Michael (1937). The Command to Look: A Formula for Picture Success. Port Townsend, WA: Feral House. ISBN 9781627310017. OCLC 889674580.
- The Model: a Book on the Problems of Posing. San Francisco, CA, USA: Camera Craft Pub. Co. 1937. OCLC 833593606 – via Internet Archive.
- Print Finishing. San Francisco, CA, USA: Camera Craft Pub. Co. 1938. OCLC 763128067.
  - Republished Print Finishing. Literary Licensing, LLC. 2012. ISBN 9781258401436.
- Outdoor Portraiture: Problems of Face and Figure in Natural Environment. San Francisco, CA, USA: Camera Craft Pub. Co. 1940. OCLC 768060028 – via Internet Archive.
- Mortensen on the Negative. New York, NY: Simon & Schuster. 1940. OCLC 568026105.
- Mortensen, William; Paul, Don M (1941). Flash in Modern Photography. San Francisco, CA, US: Camera Craft Pub. Co. OCLC 567982784 – via Internet ArchiveA.
- The New Projection Control. San Francisco, CA, USA: Camera Craft Pub. Co. 1942. OCLC 567991275 – via Internet Archive.
- The Texture Screen. Newport Beach, CA, USA: Jay Curtis Publications. 1954. OCLC 70854143.
- The Female Figure: Flesh and Symbol. Mortensen series. Newport Beach, CA, USA: Jay Curtis Publications. 1954. OCLC 70853997.
- The Paper Negative. Mortensen series. Newport Beach, CA, USA: Jay Curtis Publications. 1954. OCLC 70853857.
- Know Your Negative. Mortensen series. Newport Beach, CA, USA: Jay Curtis Publications. 1954. OCLC 70900120.
- Mortensen, William; Dunham, George (1956). How to Pose the Model. San Francisco, CA, USA: Camera Craft Pub. Co. OCLC 500685587.

=== Collections ===
- The King of Kings: as portrayed by photographic reproductions of scenes and characters from the motion picture. Based on the gospels of Matthew, Mark, Luke and John; produced by Cecil B. DeMille. 1927. OCLC 12033875.
- Mortensen, William; Mortensen, Myrdith (1971). The Mortensen Collection of the Photographic Society of America. San Francisco, CA, USA: Camera Craft Pub. Co. OCLC 70861915.
- Los Angeles Center for Photographic Studies (1971). The Photographic Magic of William Mortensen. Los Angeles, CA, USA: Los Angeles Center for Photographic Studies. OCLC 6014461.
- Dawson, Michael; Dillon, Diane; Coleman, A. D.; Lytle, Larry; Rule, Amy (1998). William Mortensen : A Revival. The Archive (University of Arizona. Center for Creative Photography). Tucson, AZ: University of Arizona Center for Creative Photography. ISBN 9780938262336. OCLC 39818931.
- Mortensen, William; Lytle, Larry; Moynihan, Michael; Coleman, A. D. (2014). American Grotesque: The Life and Art of William Mortensen. Port Townsend, WA: Feral House. ISBN 9781936239979. OCLC 875240443.

=== Documentary ===
- Soltys, Richard J.; Stone, Earl (c. 1963). Monsters and Madonnas: the World of William Mortensen (documentary film). Narrated by Vincent Price.
