= Black House (Church of Satan) =

Former Church of Satan headquarters

Religion
- Affiliation: Church of Satan
- Ecclesiastical or organizational status: Demolished

Location
- Location: 6114 California Street, San Francisco, California, United States
- Interactive map of Black House
- Coordinates: 37.7839552°N 122.4834048°W

Architecture
- Completed: 1905
- Demolished: October 17, 2001

The Black House was a building that formerly stood at 6114 California Street in San Francisco, California, in the United States. The house was used by Anton LaVey as the headquarters of his Church of Satan, from 1966 until his death in 1997. It was a few blocks from the edge of the Presidio of San Francisco near the middle of the Richmond District.

== History ==
LaVey conducted Satanic seminars and rituals at the house; one of the most notorious such rituals was the Satanic baptism of his daughter Zeena Schreck in 1967, punctuated by LaVey speaking the words "Hail Zeena! Hail Satan!" over the nude body of a female acting as the 'Satanic Altar'.

Public ceremonies were performed at the house until 1972. LaVey lost ownership of the house in 1991 as the result of a court settlement resulting from his separation from Diane Hegarty, but LaVey was allowed to reside at the Black House until his death.

Following LaVey's death, members of the Church of Satan unsuccessfully attempted to raise funds to repurchase the house, and it was demolished on October 17, 2001. A duplex now stands in its place.

Though the building is sometimes referred to as a mansion, photographs of the building taken just before its destruction show that it was a moderately sized single-family home, considerably smaller than the two apartment buildings on either side of the property. According to public records, it was listed at 2,205 square feet (204.9 m^{2}) and constructed in the year 1905.

== In popular culture ==
Norwegian experimental collective Ulver referenced Black House and its destruction in the song "1969" from their 2017 album The Assassination of Julius Caesar with the lyrics "There used to be a house at 6114 California St."

== See also ==
- William Westerfeld House
