= Blanche Barton =

American religious leader

- Born: Sharon Leigh Densley; October 1, 1961 (age 65); San Diego, California, U.S.
- Children: Satan Xerxes Carnacki LaVey

Blanche Barton (born Sharon Leigh Densley; October 1, 1961) is an American religious leader who is Magistra Templi Rex within the Church of Satan, and is addressed by LaVeyan Satanists as Magistra Barton.

== Biography ==
Barton was raised in San Diego, California. She began a relationship with Church of Satan leader Anton LaVey in 1984 after he had separated from his companion of twenty-five years, Diane Hegarty. When Hegarty resigned from her role as Church of Satan High Priestess, LaVey bestowed the role and title to Zeena LaVey (daughter of LaVey and Hegarty), who served from 1985–1990. In 1990 Zeena abdicated from the role of High Priestess and LaVey then bestowed the title to his eldest daughter, Karla LaVey. Upon LaVey's death, on October 29, 1997 Barton claimed the role of High Priestess, although Karla LaVey had not abdicated her role as High Priestess.

On November 7, 1997, Karla LaVey held a press conference to announce the death of her father Anton LaVey. It was at this time that Barton and Karla LaVey announced that they would run the Church of Satan as co-High Priestesses.

Several days later Barton produced a hand written will claiming that LaVey had left all of his belongings, property, writings, and royalties, including the Church of Satan to be put in a trust, exclusively for Barton's son Satan Xerxes Carnacki LaVey, managed by Barton. Karla contested this will in San Francisco County Superior Court and it was judged to be invalid.

A probate settlement was then reached in which Anton LaVey’s belongings, intellectual property and royalties would be split among his three children, Karla, Zeena and Xerxes, and that Barton would receive the “corporation known as Church of Satan.” After the Church of Satan as corporation was in Blanche Barton's control, Karla LaVey formed the First Satanic Church on October 31, 1999.

In 1999 Barton led an unsuccessful campaign to raise $400,000 with which to repurchase the Black House, where many of the church's rites were performed.

Barton remained High Priestess until April 30, 2002, when she appointed Peggy Nadramia as High Priestess and assumed Nadramia's previous role of Chair Mistress of the Council of Nine.

Barton wrote The Church of Satan: A History of the World's Most Notorious Religion (1990), The Secret Life of a Satanist: The Authorized Biography of Anton LaVey (1990) and We are Satanists: The History and Future of the Church of Satan (2021).
