= Anton LaVey =

American writer and Satanist (1930–1997)

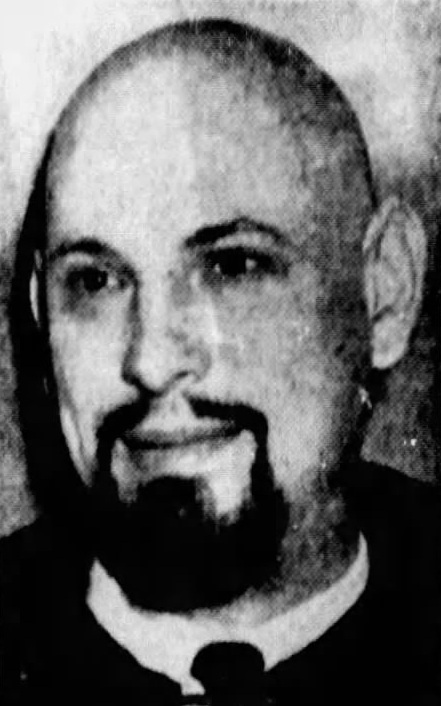
- LaVey in 1967
- Title: Author of The Satanic Bible, High Priest and founder of the Church of Satan

Personal life
- Born: Howard Stanton Levey; April 11, 1930 Chicago, Illinois, U.S.
- Died: October 29, 1997 (aged 67) San Francisco, California, U.S.
- Spouse: Carole Lansing (m. 1951; div. 1960)
- Partners: Diane Hegarty (1960–1984); Blanche Barton (1984–1997)
- Children: 3, including Karla and Zeena
- Known for: The Satanic Bible; Church of Satan
- Occupation: Author; musician; LaVeyan Satanist

Religious life
- Religion: LaVeyan Satanism
- Denomination: Church of Satan

Anton Szandor LaVey (born Howard Stanton Levey; April 11, 1930 – October 29, 1997) was an American writer, musician, and Satanist. He was the founder of the Church of Satan, and the philosophy of LaVeyan Satanism. He authored several books, including The Satanic Bible, The Satanic Witch, The Satanic Rituals, The Devil's Notebook, and Satan Speaks!. In addition, he released three albums, including The Satanic Mass, Satan Takes a Holiday, and Strange Music. He played a minor on-screen role and served as technical advisor for the 1975 film The Devil's Rain and served as host and narrator for Nick Bougas' 1989 mondo film Death Scenes.

Historian of Satanism Gareth J. Medway described LaVey as a "born showman", with anthropologist Jean La Fontaine describing him as a "colourful figure of considerable personal magnetism". The academic scholars of Satanism Per Faxneld and Jesper Aagaard Petersen described LaVey as "the most iconic figure in the Satanic milieu". LaVey was labeled many things by journalists, religious detractors, and Satanists alike, including "The Father of Satanism", the "St. Paul of Satanism", "The Black Pope", and the "evilest man in the world".

== Early life ==
LaVey was born Howard Stanton Levey on April 11, 1930 in Chicago, Illinois, to an American family with mixed European ancestry. His parents were Michael Joseph Levey (1903–1992) and Gertrude Augusta (née Coulton). He later wrote confusing and contradictory accounts of his ancestry, for instance describing his maternal grandmother as a "gypsy" from Transylvania, which was false, as she was born in Ukraine. The hagiography by LaVey's partner Blanche Barton—The Secret Life of a Satanist—describes his maternal grandmother as coming from a gypsy father and a Jewish mother from Transylvania. Barton merely interpreted LaVey's writings and did not research European birth records. Popular writer Doug Brod asserts that LaVey's ancestry was Russian-Jewish on both matrilineal and patrilineal sides, but LaVey's parents, both born in the U.S., were not Jewish, and he never identified as Jewish.

His parents supported his musical interests, as he tried a number of instruments; his favorites were keyboards such as the piano and accordion. Anton played piano in a Baptist church as a boy, and played oboe in high school.

He attended Tamalpais High School in Mill Valley, California, until the age of 16. LaVey claimed he left high school at age 16 to join the Clyde Beatty Circus and later carnivals, first as a roustabout and cage boy in an act with the big cats, then as a musician playing the calliope. However, journalist Lawrence Wright investigated LaVey's background and found no evidence LaVey ever worked in a circus either as a musician or a cage boy.

In the winter of 1948, LaVey began to work as an organist in bars, lounges, and nightclubs. His "genius" on keyboards helped him attain gigs. He claimed to have had a brief affair with then-unknown Marilyn Monroe while playing organ in Los Angeles burlesque houses, stating that she was a dancer at the Mayan Theater at the time. This was challenged by those who knew Monroe then, as well as the manager of the Mayan, Paul Valentine, who said she had never been one of his dancers, nor had the theater ever been used as a burlesque house.

According to his biography, LaVey moved back to San Francisco. LaVey met Carole Lansing in 1950, and they married the following year, when Lansing was fifteen years old. Lansing gave birth to LaVey's first daughter, Karla LaVey, born in 1952. In order to avoid the Korean War draft, LaVey studied criminology at the City College of San Francisco. He then allegedly attained a job as a photographer for the San Francisco Police Department (SFPD), where he worked for three years. LaVey claimed to have dabbled as a psychic investigator, looking into "800 calls" referred to him by SFPD. Later biographers questioned whether LaVey ever worked with the SFPD, as there are no records substantiating the claim. (Wright could find no evidence of LaVey either working at the SFPD or being enrolled at the City College of San Francisco.)

LaVey and Carole divorced in 1960, after LaVey became involved with Diane Hegarty. Hegarty and LaVey never married, but she was his companion for 24 years and mothered his second daughter, Zeena Galatea Schreck (née LaVey) (born in 1963). At the end of their relationship in 1986, Hegarty sued for palimony.

== Church of Satan ==
Anton LaVey became a local celebrity in San Francisco through his paranormal research and live performances as an organist, including playing the Wurlitzer at the Lost Weekend cocktail lounge. He was also a publicly noticeable figure; he drove a coroner's van around town, and he walked his pet black leopard, named Zoltan. In 1965, he acquired a lion, named Togare, as a pet. This garnered LaVey much media attention. The lion was eventually given to the San Francisco Zoo. He attracted many San Francisco notables to his parties. Guests included Carin de Plessin, Michael Harner, Chester A. Arthur III, Forrest J Ackerman, Fritz Leiber, Cecil E. Nixon, and Kenneth Anger. LaVey formed a group called the Order of the Trapezoid, which later evolved into the governing body of the Church of Satan. According to Faxneld and Petersen, the Church of Satan represented "the first public, highly visible, and long-lasting organisation which propounded a coherent Satanic discourse".

Never one for theory, LaVey created a belief system somewhere between religion, philosophy, psychology, and carnival (or circus), freely appropriating science, mythology, fringe beliefs, and play in a potent mix. The core goal was always indulgence and vital existence, based on the devices and desires of the self-made man.

— Per Faxneld and Jesper Petersen.

LaVey began presenting Friday night lectures on the occult and rituals. A member of this circle suggested that he had the basis for a new religion. According to LaVey himself, on Walpurgisnacht, April 30, 1966, he ritualistically shaved his head, allegedly "in the tradition of ancient executioners", declared the founding of the Church of Satan and proclaimed 1966 as "the Year One", Anno Satanas, the first year of the Age of Satan. LaVey's image has been described as "Mephistophelian", and may have been inspired by an occult-themed episode of the television show The Wild Wild West titled "The Night of the Druid's Blood" which originally aired on March 25, 1966 and starred Don Rickles as the evil magician and Satanic cult leader Asmodeus, whose Mephistophelean persona is virtually identical to that which LaVey adopted one month later. Media attention followed the subsequent Satanic wedding ceremony of journalist John Raymond to New York City socialite Judith Case on February 1, 1967. The Los Angeles Times and San Francisco Chronicle were among the newspapers that printed articles dubbing him "The Black Pope". LaVey performed Satanic baptisms (including the first Satanic baptism in history for his three-year-old daughter Zeena, dedicating her to Satan and the Left-Hand Path, which garnered worldwide publicity and was originally recorded on The Satanic Mass LP).

In the late 1960s and early 1970s, LaVey melded ideological influences from Friedrich Nietzsche, Ayn Rand, H. L. Mencken, and social Darwinism with the ideology and ritual practices of the Church of Satan. He wrote essays introduced with reworked excerpts from Ragnar Redbeard's Might Is Right and concluded with "Satanized" versions of John Dee's Enochian Keys to create books such as The Complete Witch (re-released in 1989 as The Satanic Witch), and The Satanic Rituals. The latter book also included rituals drawing on the work of H. P. Lovecraft. Admitting his use of Might is Right, LaVey stated that he did so in order to "immortalize a writer who had profoundly reached me".

In 1972, the public work at LaVey's Black House in San Francisco was curtailed and work was continued via sanctioned regional "grottoes". In early 1975, LaVey announced that higher degrees of initiation could be given in return for a financial contribution. In June 1975, editor of the Church's newsletter, Michael Aquino, left the Church of Satan and formed the theistic Temple of Set, claiming to take an unknown number of dissenters with him. The Church maintains this policy announcement was designed to "clean house" of members who did not understand Satanic philosophy.

== Later life and death ==
In 1980, the FBI interviewed LaVey in connection with an alleged plot to murder Ted Kennedy. LaVey told the agents that most of the church's followers were "fanatics, cultists and weirdos". The agents reported that LaVey's "interest in the Church of Satan is strictly from a monetary point of view," and that he spent "most of his time furnishing interviews, writing material, and lately has become interested in photography."

In July 1984, Hegarty issued a restraining order against LaVey, which he did not contest. LaVey's third and final companion was Blanche Barton. On November 1, 1993, Barton gave birth to Satan Xerxes Carnacki LaVey. Barton succeeded LaVey as the head of the Church after his death and has since stepped down from that role and handed it to Magus Peter H. Gilmore.

According to his family, Anton LaVey died on October 29, 1997, in St. Mary's Medical Center in San Francisco of pulmonary edema; however, his death certificate lists October 31, 1997. He was taken to St. Mary's, a Catholic hospital, because it was the closest available. A secret Satanic funeral, attended by invitation only, was held in Colma, after which LaVey's body was cremated.

He did not speak any last words because he was unconscious, but rumors later arose that he uttered the following: "Oh my, oh my, what have I done! There's something very wrong, there's something very wrong, there's something very wrong!" This rumor was judged unfounded by Snopes.

On February 2, 1998, his estranged daughter Zeena Schreck and her then husband Nikolas Schreck published a nine-page "fact sheet", in which they endorsed Wright's earlier allegations and claimed that many more of LaVey's stories about his life had been false.

== Views ==
=== Thought ===
LaVey included references to other esoteric and religious groups throughout his writings, claiming for instance that the Yazidis and Knights Templar were carriers of a Satanic tradition that had been passed down to the twentieth century. Scholar of Satanism Per Faxneld believed that these references were deliberately tongue-in-cheek and ironic, but he noted that many Satanists who had read LaVey's writings had taken them to be literal historical claims about the past. Although he regularly derided older esotericists, LaVey also relied upon their work; for instance, making use of John Dee's Enochian system in The Satanic Bible. Faxneld therefore believed that there was a tension in LaVey's thought between his desire to establish prestigious Satanic predecessors and his desire to be seen as the founder of the first real Satanic society.

Dyrendel argued that LaVey partook in conspiracy culture as he grew older, for he was greatly concerned with modern society's impact on individual agency. LaVey was conservative in his attitude to law and order and insisted that the Church abide by state law in all of its actions. He supported eugenics and believed that it would be a necessity in the future. LaVey hated rock and metal music, with or without "Satanic" lyrics, and often expressed his distaste for it.

=== Politics ===
Due to the neo-Nazi James H. Madole's opposition to Christianity, he sought new religious ideas and was attracted to a merging of fascism and Satanism that led to an alliance between LaVey and Madole. Black Sun by Nicholas Goodrick-Clarke states, "James Wagner, a former Security Echelon (SE) commander, recalls that relations between the NRP and the Church of Satan, founded in 1966 by Anton Szandor LaVey, were cordial. Madole and LaVey frequently met at the NRP office and in the Warlock Bookshop in New York."

== Reception and legacy ==
Historian of Satanism Gareth J. Medway described LaVey as "A born showman", with anthropologist Jean La Fontaine describing him as "A colourful figure of considerable personal magnetism". Medway contrasted LaVey from the likes of Jim Jones, David Koresh, and Charles Manson, noting that whereas the latter were the charismatic leaders of apocalyptic communes, within the Church of Satan, "No one hung onto [LaVey's] every word, and church members [were] allowed considerable autonomy."

The academic scholars, Per Faxneld and Jesper Aagaard Petersen, described LaVey as "the most iconic figure in the Satanic milieu", while Asbjørn Dyrendel described him as "the founder of modern Satanism". In his 2001 examination of Satanists, the sociologist James R. Lewis noted that, to his surprise, his findings "consistently pointed to the centrality of LaVey's influence on modern Satanism". As a result he "concluded that— despite his heavy dependence on prior thinkers— LaVey was directly responsible for the genesis of Satanism as a serious religious (as opposed to a purely literary) movement".

His books The Satanic Bible and The Satanic Rituals have been cited as having "an influence far beyond" the Church of Satan's membership. In 1995, the religious studies scholar Graham Harvey wrote that although the Church had no organized presence in the United Kingdom, LaVey's writings were widely accessible in British bookshops.

Due to increasing visibility through his books, LaVey was the subject of numerous articles in the news media throughout the world, including popular magazines such as Look, McCall's, Newsweek, and Time, and men's magazines. He also appeared on talk shows such as The Joe Pyne Show, Donahue, and The Tonight Show, and in a feature-length documentary called Satanis in 1970. LaVey claimed that he had been appointed consultant to the film Rosemary's Baby, which revolved around a group of fictional Satanists, and that he also had a cameo appearance in the film as the Devil. However, critics have argued that none of this was true. In an article published in Rolling Stone magazine in 1991, the journalist Lawrence Wright revealed that through his own investigative work, he found that many of LaVey's claims about his life had been untrue. Two official biographies have been written on LaVey, including The Devil's Avenger by Burton H. Wolfe, published in 1974 and The Secret Life of a Satanist by Blanche Barton, published in 1990.

== LaVey-related books ==
=== Books by LaVey ===
- The Satanic Bible (1969)
- The Satanic Rituals (1972)
- The Satanic Witch (1989)
- The Devil's Notebook (1992)
- Satan Speaks! (1998)
- Letters from the Devil (2010)

=== Books featuring writings by LaVey ===
- Rants and Incendiary Tracts: Voices of Desperate Illumination 1558–Present (1989)
- Apocalypse Culture: Expanded & Revised Edition (1990)
- Might Is Right or The Survival of the Fittest: Centennial Edition (1996)

=== Books about LaVey ===
- The Black Pope
- The Devil's Avenger: A Biography of Anton Szandor LaVey (1974)
- The Secret Life of a Satanist: The Authorized Biography of Anton LaVey (1990)
- Popular Witchcraft: Straight from the Witch's Mouth (2004)
- Letters From the Devil: The Lost Writing of Anton Szandor LaVey by Anton Szandor LaVey (2008)
- California Infernal: Anton LaVey & Jayne Mansfield: As Portrayed by Walter Fischer (2017)
- Anton LaVey and the Church of Satan: Infernal Wisdom from the Devil's Den (2022)
- Born with a Tail: The Devilish Life and Wicked Times of Anton Szandor LaVey, Founder of the Church of Satan (2024)

== Recordings of Anton LaVey ==
- The Satanic Mass (1968)
- Answer Me/Honolulu Baby (1993)
- Strange Music (1994)
- Satan Takes a Holiday (1995)
- Anton Szandor Lavey The Devil Speaks (& Plays) (2017)

== Films starring LaVey ==
- Invocation of My Demon Brother (1969)
- Satanis: The Devil's Mass (1970)
- The Devil's Rain (1975)
- Death Scenes (1989)
- Speak of the Devil (1993)
- Iconoclast (2010)
- An American Satan (2019)

== See also ==
- Left-hand path
- LaVeyan Satanism
- The Satanic Bible
