= Church of Satan =

Organization dedicated to atheistic Satanism

- Sigil of Baphomet, an official symbol of LaVeyan Satanism
- Abbreviation: CoS
- Type: Satanism
- Classification: New religious movement
- Scripture: The Satanic Bible
- Theology: Egotheism; Atheism
- Governance: Council of Nine
- Structure: Cabal
- High Priest: Peter H. Gilmore
- Associations: Non-ecumenical
- Region: International
- Headquarters: Poughkeepsie, New York
- Founder: Anton Szandor LaVey
- Origin: April 30, 1966; Black House, San Francisco, California
- Other name: The Satanic Church
- Publications: The Black Flame, The Cloven Hoof
- Official website: www.churchofsatan.com

The Church of Satan (CoS) is a religious group dedicated to Satanism as defined by Anton Szandor LaVey. Founded in San Francisco in 1966, by LaVey, it is considered the "oldest Satanic religion in continual existence", and inspired "numerous imitator and breakaway groups". (Note: Religious studies scholar R. Van Luijk writes, "Genealogically speaking, every known Satanist group or organization in the world today derives directly or indirectly from LaVey's 1966 Church of Satan, even if they are dismissive of LaVey or choose to emphasize other real or alleged forerunners of Satanism.") In its early years, the CoS, and the Church's holy text, The Satanic Bible, sold nearly a million copies. LaVey was the church's High Priest until his death in 1997. In 2002, Peter H. Gilmore was appointed to the position of high priest, and the church's headquarters were moved to Hell's Kitchen, Manhattan, New York City.

Members do not believe that Satan literally exists and do not worship him, seeing the figure of Satan instead as a representation of individualism and personal freedom. The Church of Satan's belief system focuses on a materialistic, atheistic view, though LaVey's writings also involved ritual magic. Throughout its existence, the Church of Satan has undergone a number of schisms, resulting in the existence of several other Satanist groups.The Church rejects the legitimacy of any other organizations who claim to be Satanists, including theistic Satanists.

== Beliefs ==
LaVey described his religion as "just Ayn Rand's philosophy with ceremony and ritual added"; similarly, sociologist of religion James R. Lewis described it as "a blend of Epicureanism and Ayn Rand's philosophy, flavored with a pinch of ritual magic." There is no belief in nor worship of the Devil or a Christian notion of Satan.

The Church rejects the legitimacy of any other organizations who claim to be Satanists. Gilmore rejects the legitimacy of theistic Satanists, who believe Satan to be a supernatural being or force that may be contacted or supplicated to, dubbing them "devil worshipers". In LaVey's book, The Satanic Bible, the Satanist's concept of a God is described as the Satanist's true "self"— a projection of their own personality, not an external deity. Satan is used as a representation of personal liberty and individualism. LaVey's views on magic were ambiguous. He insisted Satanism was a "materialist philosophy" but also often talked of magic. He included this rule in his "Rules of the Earth":

Acknowledge the power of magic if you have employed it successfully to obtain your desires. If you deny the power of magic after having called upon it with success, you will lose all you have obtained."

LaVey also often talked of a "Satanic magical formula" of "nine parts respectability to one part outrageousness", Satanism requiring some element of sinisterness, but not so much as to put off potential congregants. The "Rules of the Earth" in LaVey's Satanic Bible specifically prohibited unwanted sexual advances and harming animals or children, but the Church also "often featured a nude woman serving as an altar" in its black masses. LaVey said "If Satanists didn't care, they wouldn't be so dark and pessimistic."

== History ==
=== Early years ===
In the 1960s Anton Szandor LaVey formed a group called the Order of the Trapezoid, which later became the governing body of the Church of Satan. The group included: "The Baroness" Carin de Plessen, Dr. Cecil Nixon, Kenneth Anger, San Francisco city assessor Russell Wolden, and Donald Werby. Founded in an era when there was much public interest in the occult, witchcraft and Satanism, the church enjoyed a heyday for several years after its founding. Celebrities attended LaVey's satanic parties and he was invited on talk shows. His Satanic Bible sold nearly a million copies. The Church of Satan was established on Walpurgisnacht, April 30, 1966, by LaVey.

One attempt to establish the church abroad was done in connection with Maarten Lamers of the Netherlands who read The Satanic Bible and in 1971 flew to San Francisco to meet LaVey. Back in Amsterdam, Lamers established the first CoS grotto outside the U.S. -- the Magistralis Grotto or the Kerk van Satan. The "Kerk" was in the Red Light District and connected to a club called Walpurga Abbey where customers could pay by the minute to observe "monastic sisters" of the Abbey masturbate on stage. Lamers insisted that since the sisters were "performing religious acts of sexual magic", Walpurga Abbey was tax-exempt. The Dutch government disagreed and in 1987, "after a decade of police raids and legal battles", Lamers was compelled to pay 10 million guilders in back taxes.

In 1972, LaVey stopped holding weekly rituals at the Black House and announced these would be done at the local grottos. Then on September 27, 1974, he declared the end of all regional organizations and that individual members and grottos should report to the Church's Central Grotto in San Francisco. LaVey called this move "Phase IV of his master plan".

=== Schisms ===
Starting in the early 1970s, the Church faced internal dissent and a series of schisms. The first breakaway was by the Babylonian Grotto and its leader Wayne West, who LaVey excommunicated. A bigger schism happened with the excommunication of the Stygian Grotto, whose leader established the Church of Satanic Brotherhood in 1973 with units in Dayton, Indianapolis, Louisville, New York City, and St. Petersburg (FL). In 1973 there was another splinter group, the Order of the Black Ram, which was neo-Nazi in orientation. A later, more resilient offshoot was the World Church of Satanic Liberation, which ran from 1986 to 2011.

In 1975, the Church of Satan underwent a significant fracture. Michael A. Aquino, the editor of the church newsletter and a fairly high level leader in the church, who disagreed with LaVey's changes, left to found the Temple of Set, taking a significant portion of the CoS leadership with him. This schism involved the largest Church branch, the Nineveh Grotto in NJ, and the Lilith Grotto in NY, among others. The Temple of Set reportedly had more than 500 members at its founding, although Anton LaVey claimed that only 29 people left. LaVey announced that the Temple of Set schism was not a setback but "Phase V" of his master plan, and according to author Amina Lap from this point on Satanism became a "splintered and disorganized movement".

Schisms from the Church were caused by several factors, according to sociologist Foertsch. He focused on differences in costliness or barriers to entry for members, disputes over authority and doctrine, and opportunities for niche development in the American counter-culture world of occultism, and persecution of alleged Satanists during the moral panic (described below) of the 1980s.

The same year LaVey painted the Black House beige to lessen unwanted attention and "largely retired from public life". (In 1986, the Black House was repainted black.) According to at least one critic, James R. Lewis, LaVey was not instituting "a Master Plan" but demonstrating that he "was not up to making the necessary personal sacrifices that being a founding prophet and leader required" because his motives for founding the Church were personal enrichment and self-aggrandizement, not spreading some religious truth.

=== 1980s, early 1990s, and "Satanic Panic" ===
In the 1980s a phenomenon that became known as the "Satanic Panic" arose and the media reported concerns of criminal conspiracies by the Church of Satan. According to a report released in 2020, LaVey indicated to FBI agents who interviewed him on October 31, 1980 that he had lost interest in the Church.

"LAVEY STATED THAT HE IS WELL AWARE THAT MOST PEOPLE ASSOCIATED WITH THE CHURCH OF SATAN ARE IN FACT 'FANATICS, CULTISTS, AND WEIRDOES.' HE STATED HIS INTEREST IN THE CHURCH OF SATAN IS STRICTLY FROM A MONETARY POINT OF VIEW AND SPENDS HIS TIME FURNISHING INTERVIEWS, WRITING MATERIALS, AND LATELY HAS BECOME INTERESTED IN PHOTOGRAPHY."

During the 1980s and 90s, LaVey was no longer interested in making media appearances and began a "long period of silence", becoming "increasingly reclusive". In 1985 he began sending his daughter Zeena to represent the CoS. She became the High Priestess of the Church and in 1988 married Nikolas Schreck, taking his surname.

On Walpurgisnacht 30 April 1990, Zeena formally renounced any association with the Church or LaVey, whom she now called her "unfather". Shortly after leaving the church, Zeena testified against LaVey in support of her mother's (Diane Hegarty) palimony lawsuit against LaVey. The court awarded Hegarty half of LaVey's property, forcing him to sell the Black House and bankrupting him.

In 1994, Kenneth Lanning, an FBI expert in investigating child sexual abuse, produced a report on Satanic Ritual Abuse (SRA) aimed at child protection authorities, which stated that despite hundreds of investigations, no corroboration of SRA had been found. Following this report, several convictions based on SRA allegations were overturned and the defendants released.

=== After LaVey ===
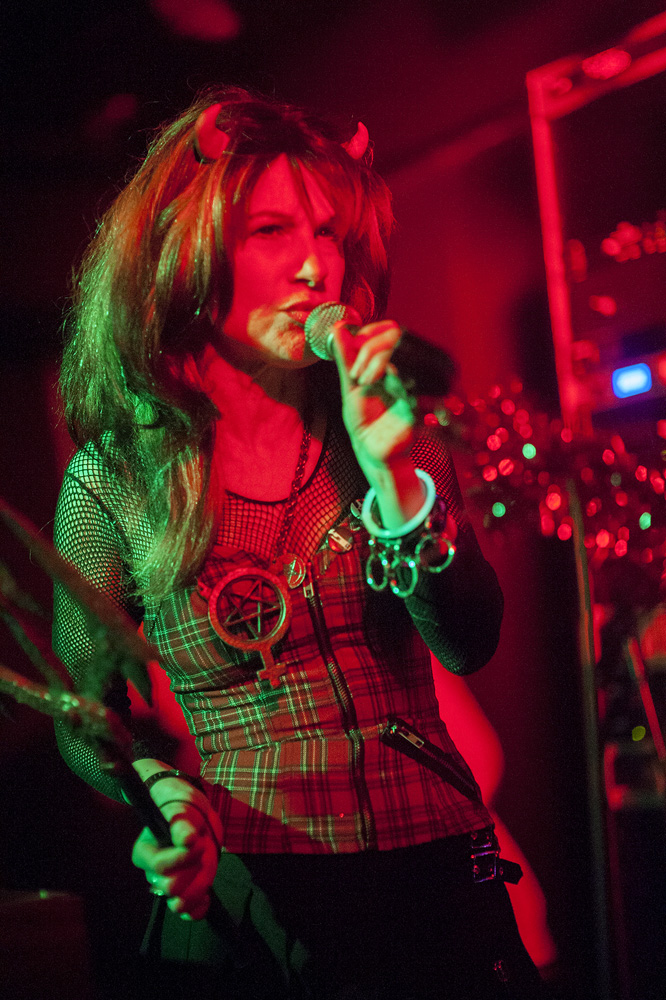
Karla LaVey during a "Black X-Mass" celebration in 2012

After Anton Szandor LaVey's death on October 29, 1997, the role of High Priest was empty for some time. On November 7, 1997 Karla LaVey made a press release about continuing the church with fellow high priestess Blanche Barton. Barton eventually received ownership of the organization, which she held for 4 years. Karla LaVey ultimately left the Church of Satan and founded First Satanic Church. On October 16, 2001, the Black House, the original home of the Church, was demolished after a fundraising effort failed to raise enough to buy it. (In 1992, LaVey had sold the house to a real estate developer to raise money to settle a divorce but the developer allowed LaVey to continue to live in the house for free.)

Blanche was high priestess until 2002, when Peter H. Gilmore was appointed to the position of high priest. He moved the church's headquarters to Hell's Kitchen, Manhattan, New York City.

In October 2004, the Royal Navy officially recognised its first registered Satanist, 24-year-old Chris Cranmer, as a technician aboard HMS Cumberland.

=== 6/6/06 High Mass ===
On June 6, 2006, the Church of Satan held the first public ritual Satanic Mass in 40 years at the Steve Allen Theater in the Center for Inquiry in Los Angeles. The date corresponds to the number of the Beast, 666, from the biblical Book of Revelation. The ritual was based on the rites outlined in The Satanic Bible and The Satanic Rituals.

The event was by invitation only, and over one hundred members of the Church of Satan from around the world filled the theatre to capacity. Many members of the Church of Satan were interviewed by the BBC with permission.

=== Example of law abidingness ===
In December 2007 the Associated Press reported on a story concerning the Church of Satan, in which a teenager had sent an email to High Priest Gilmore stating he wanted to "kill in the name of our unholy lord Satan". Gilmore then reported the message to the Federal Bureau of Investigation, who informed local police, who arrested the teenager.

=== Realm of Satan documentary ===
In January 2024, the film Realm of Satan was shown at the Sundance Film Festival. The film is similar to a documentary, though it consists primarily of scenes staged with members of the Church of Satan. One reviewer described it as "an 80-minute art installation in which Satanists are rendered—and deliberately render themselves—performative characters in a diabolical play of their own making." The film is directed by Scott Cummings and it shows a variety of satanic rituals, which may have been performed for the film alone.

== Membership and influence ==
According to The Washington Post in 1998, church membership was never over 300.

The Church dismisses the idea of a "Satanic Community" and does not share membership lists with its members, arguing members are "radical individualists" who "may share very little in common beyond" being Satanists. Scholars agree that there is no reliably documented case of Satanic continuity prior to the founding of the Church of Satan. It was the first organized church in modern times to be devoted to the figure of Satan, and according to Faxneld and Petersen, the Church represented "the first public, highly visible, and long-lasting organization which propounded a coherent Satanic discourse".
