= Nebraska Legislature 40th district =

American legislative district

Nebraska's 40th legislative district
- Map of Nebraska Legislature districts with the 40th district shaded in red
Senator
Barry DeKay; R–Niobrara
since 2023
- Demographics: 92.3% White; 0.3% Black; 3.2% Hispanic; 0.3% Asian; 2.6% Native American
- Population (2020): 40,081

The Nebraska Legislature's 40th district is one of the 49 legislative districts in the Nebraska Legislature. The district is located in northeastern Nebraska and covers all of Cedar, Holt, Knox, Antelope, the northern half of Pierce, and most of Dixon counties. Prominent settlements in the area include Hartington, O'Neill, Neligh, and Creighton. Barry DeKay has represented the district since 2023.

== Demographics ==
The US Census Bureau recorded the population as of 2020 at 40,081.

- 92.3% of the district is White.
- 3.2% of the district is Hispanic.
- 2.6% of the district is Native American.
- 0.3% of the district is Black.
- 0.3% of the district is Asian.

== List of representatives ==
Representative	Party	Years of service	Legislature	Residence
Barry DeKay	Republican	2023 - present	108th-109th	Niobrara
Tim Gragert	Republican	2019-2023	106th-107th	Creighton
Tyson Larson	Republican	2011-2019	102nd-105th	O'Neill
Cap Dierks	Republican	2007-2011	100th-101st	Ewing
Doug Cunningham	Republican	2003-2006	98th-99th	Wausa
Cap Dierks	Democratic	1987-2003	90th-97th	Ewing
John DeCamp	Republican	1974-1987	84th-89th *	Neligh
John DeCamp	Democratic	1971-1974	82nd-83rd	Neligh
John DeCamp	Republican	1971	82nd	Neligh
