= The New Satanists =

1994 book by Linda Blood

- Cover of the first edition
- Author: Linda Blood
- Language: English
- Subject: Satanism
- Publisher: Warner Books
- Publication date: 1994
- Publication place: United States
- Media type: Print (paperback)
- Pages: 244
- ISBN: 0-446-36473-8
- OCLC: 30741572
- Dewey Decimal: 133.422
- LC Class: BF1548 .B57 1994

The New Satanists is a 1994 book by Linda Blood, a former member of the Satanist organization the Temple of Set and an affiliate of the anti-cult organization the American Family Foundation. It was published in 1994 in paperback by the American publishing house Warner Books. Marketed as an expose of the "cult" of Satanism, it is heavily critical of Satanism, especially the Temple of Set and its leader, Michael A. Aquino.

It focuses on negative elements of Satanism; Blood argues that Satanism is a dangerous ideology, connecting it to incidents of youth crime, murders, drug trafficking, and prostitution, among other crimes, as well as allegations of Satanic ritual abuse. Blood argues such allegations are largely legitimate and should not be discounted, in contradiction to the widespread skepticism of Satanic ritual abuse claims. It considers satanic ritual abuse allegations to be evidence of a wider Satanic conspiracy, and critiques Satanism for its ties to neo-Nazism and white supremacy. It portrays Aquino as heavily tied to this conspiracy.

The book was criticized by scholars for its sensational nature and factual inaccuracies, and for contributing to the Satanic panic. Shortly after the book's publication, Aquino and his wife sued Blood and Warner Books for libel. The case was settled out of court and the book was withdrawn from sale. Scholar of religion Joseph P. Laycock identified it as "a significant text in the Satanic Panic".

== Background and publication history ==
The New Satanists was authored by Linda Osborne Blood. Blood was a former member of the Temple of Set (ToS) an American Satanist organization founded by Michael A. Aquino in 1975. During the Satanic panic, a general period of culture panic over Satanism, the group was frequently targeted by allegations of various misdeeds, including fascism, white supremacy, and child abuse. Blood had been a member for a brief time, 1979 to 1980, before she was expelled from the organization. Writer Spencer Sunshine identified Blood as the group's most famous defector.

She was affiliated with the anti-cult organization the American Family Foundation (AFF). Blood coauthored a book on Satanic violence with psychologist and cult specialist Michael Langone in 1990, Satanism and Occult-Related Violence, published by the AFF. Scholar W. Michael Ashcraft described this book as having a far more cautious and skeptical tone than The New Satanists, writing that "perhaps Langone exercised greater editorial control over the content of this book than Blood".

The New Satanists was published in 1994 by Warner Books in New York City, in a 244-page paperback edition. The book was marketed as an expose of Satanism, with a note on the cover describing the book thus: "A former cult member rips the veil of secrecy off the most frightening criminal phenomenon of our time". The book had an initial print run of 29,000. It credits a number of people affiliated with the AFF.

== Contents ==
Michael A. Aquino, a key subject of the book, in 1973

In an introduction, she describes falling in love with Aquino, claiming he seduced her into Satanism, something she would not have otherwise been involved with. She says she started writing to him after reading a story he wrote, and they struck up a correspondence; she writes that her involvement with Aquino and her joining his Temple of Set (ToS) resulted in an "inexorable course to disaster", costing her her "marriage, [her] career, and [her] peace of mind". She was eventually expelled from the group. After she was kicked out, she writes that she came to see something more nefarious with both Aquino and Satanism. She says she wrote the book to educate people on the dangers of cults, which she describes as "manipulative, controlling organizations". The book is very critical of Satanism, particularly the Temple of Set and Aquino, arguing that it is exploitative.

In chapter one, "Satanism Today", she focuses on the modern claims of ritual abuse, including the Presidio sexual abuse case, where, at the Child Development Center at San Francisco's Presidio Army Base, there was a series of allegations of child molestation. This came to involve Aquino, who, she writes, was accused of satanic ritual abuse by one girl at the center. She argues that there exist "intergenerational" satanic cults that commit murders and "worldwide drug and arms trafficking, prostitution, pornography, and other organized criminal activities". She connects this to the rise of actual Satanic organizations like the Church of Satan and its various offshoots, including the Temple of Set, and identifies Satanism as a serious danger.

In "Historical Background", Blood traces what she identifies as the ancient roots of modern Satanism. The book traces a history of Satanism for centuries prior to the modern day, tracing it to pagan rites, ancient gnostic sects, and the Cathars. She identifies an early case in medieval knight Gilles de Rais and occultist Aleister Crowley. She continues on to the Church of Satan and its schisms. She argues Anton LaVey, its founder, is a genuinely dangerous figure who the media has dismissed as a "harmless con artist". She writes about its various schisms and associates these groups with instances of Satanic crime. In the next chapter, she focuses on those cases, attributing it in part to LaVey's Satanic Bible; Blood claims that "since 1984 there has been at least one sensational satanism-related murder case per year".

The focus then shifts to "Satanic Ritual Child Abuse", allegations of ritualistic abuse involving Satanic and occult themes. Blood argues that such claims are legitimate and should not be discounted, surprisingly frequent, and evidence of a wider Satanic conspiracy. She discusses and discounts the widespread skepticism of such claims. In discussing adults who claim to have survived such experiences, she presents recovered memories as evidence. She returns to the Presidio case. Gary Hambright at the Presidio army daycare was accused of molesting many of the children there, but an allegation was also made against Aquino. Aquino was never charged and the charges against Hambright were also dropped. She acknowledges flaws in the investigations but argues that "something terrible did happen at the Presidio", and that Aquino is guilty of the accusation. She suggests that the Presidio case is part of a much larger satanic conspiracy masterminded by Aquino, portraying him as the central figure of the case rather than Hambright.

This is followed by a chapter on Satanism and Nazism, arguing that there is a growing connection between the two, with the international white supremacist movement becoming increasingly influenced by Satanism. She connects this to the ties of the Temple of Set with neo-Nazism, but also connects it with LaVey's actions and commonalities between the ideologies. In the final chapter, Blood covers claimed international occurrences of Satanic abuse and crimes, and suggests that Satanism should be treated as a serious threat.

== Reception and analysis ==
The book has been criticized by scholars for its factual inaccuracy and sensationalism and for contributing to the Satanic panic. Scholar of religion Joseph P. Laycock identified it as "a significant text in the Satanic Panic". Mark Pendergrast described it as "explicitly avowing belief in violent multi-generational satanic cults", while W. Michael Ashcraft wrote that it "claimed that La Vey and many other figures in history represented evil in the world." Scholar of esotericism Kennet Granholm criticized it as a "sensationalist" work, saying it was portrayed as "a 'chilling expose' of the Temple's vile secrets", and described its allegations against the Temple of Set as totally unfounded.

Mary de Young considered it alongside two other works about claimed ritual abuse in the early 1990s: Diane Ehrensaft's 1992 study of alleged victims in the Presidio case, "Preschool Child Sex Abuse: The Aftermath of the Presidio Case", and John DeCamp's book on the Franklin sex scandal, The Franklin Cover-Up. She argued all three works were of most interest due to the time they appeared, after the main period of the Satanic ritual abuse moral panic, writing that it "reveals something about the divergent vapor trails the imploding moral panic left in its wake during the 1990s and into the turn of the new millennium." She described The New Satanists as "a Catherine-wheel cloud of conspiracy" and as promoting ritual abuse conspiracy theories, portraying Aquino as a master manipulator obsessed with Nazism.

In his book Lure of the Sinister, Gareth J. Medway argued that Blood overemphasized Satanic violence, arguing that "since there are more than twenty thousand murders a year in the United States, one Satanic killing a year is not much", especially given how tenuous the connections were. He further argued that: "Many American teenagers dabble in Satanism. Suppose that one person in a thousand is a Satanist of some sort; then one would expect about twenty American Satanists to commit murder annually. Unfortunately, there are no reliable figures either for the number of Satanists or for the number of 'Satanic' murders, so there is no way of knowing if Satanists are more likely to kill than the average person."

A review in the American Family Foundation affiliated journal Cultic Studies Journal positively reviewed the book. Reviewer Clark S. Eleanor called it "excellent" and an "extraordinary book". A review in the official Church of Satan magazine The Black Flame criticized the book, calling it "typical Xtian Satanism-bashing of a particularly virulent sort, filled with irrationality, misrepresentation, and errors." Michael Moynihan, discussed as a far-right Satanist in the book, said in an interview that he "can’t really fault any of the facts about me in the book", though said it lacked information since 1990. Writing retrospectively, Spencer Sunshine more positively evaluated its coverage on the specific area of connections between neo-Nazism and Satanism; though noting that it was marred by some errors and was part of a "Satanic panic" book, he described its chapter on the subject as generally good and the best source available at the time.

== Lawsuit and withdrawal from the market ==
In October 1994, shortly after the book was published, Michael Aquino and his wife, Lilith, and also the Temple of Set, sued Blood and the book's publisher, Warner Books, in federal district court for libel, seeking an unspecified amount of damages from both. Aquino claimed malicious libel due to the contents of the book. According to the couple, Warner Books had rejected their request to voluntarily withdraw the book or the passages at issue. They argued the book endangered them as the book printed their address alongside the claims.

The book alleged that the claims that they, with Gary Hambright, molested a 3-year-old, were legitimate, and that they were masterminds of a satanic plot to sexually abuse children. The couple had been investigated for nearly a year and their home was searched, but no evidence was found and they were never charged. The case was dropped, and the charges against Hambright were also later dismissed. They argued the book falsely linked them to the Presidio case, kidnapping, ritual child molestation, and extortion and portrayed them as "pedophiles, child abusers, murderers and the masterminds behind a nationwide satanic conspiracy." Specific claims identified in the complaint as false or unfounded included: the implication of their guilt in the Presidio case, the implication that they had arranged the kidnapping of a lawyer involved in the Presidio case, the accusation that Aquino and other ToS members were pedophiles involved in neo-Nazism and Satanic crime, and falsely stating that Aquino had been kicked out of the army, when he had retired with honors several years later. The suit also claimed that Blood had been expelled from the ToS for "vulgar sexual behavior" after Aquino had rejected her; the Aquinos claimed that Blood had continued to harass them and had afterwards made hundreds of threatening calls to Aquino, including one where she threatened to kill him.

Aquino also pursued litigation as the result of another book, Painted Black, authored by Carl Raschke. Blood is thanked in the preface for Painted Black. In 1995, Aquino created a pamphlet entitled "Comments Concerning The New Satanists by Linda Blood". Aquino was successful in his action against the books; both cases were settled out of court. An article in The Cult Observer, a magazine operated by the AFF, also declared that the litigation had been "dealt with" and the book would "remain on store shelves". Nevertheless the book was withdrawn from sale by Warner Books as a result of the lawsuit.
