= Lawrence E. King Jr. =

American banker and politician (born 1944)

- Born: 1944 (age 81–82); Omaha, Nebraska, U.S.
- Occupations: Manager and treasurer of the Franklin Community Federal Credit Union
- Spouse: Alice King
- Status: Released
- Conviction: Fraud
- Penalty: 15 years

Lawrence E. King Jr. (born September 7, 1944) is an American former banker and former Republican Party politician from Omaha, Nebraska. He was the manager and treasurer of the Franklin Community Federal Credit Union (FCFCU) and the vice chair of the National Black Republican Council. In 1988, the FCFCU collapsed, and in 1991, he was sentenced to 15 years in prison for financial fraud.

King was also the target of conspiracy theories which accused him of being involved in sex trafficking and child sexual abuse, but all related charges were dropped.

== Early life and family ==
Lawrence E. King Jr. was born on September 7, 1944 in Omaha, Nebraska.

He married Alice Ploche on April 20, 1968. They had one son, Lawrence III, born on November 1, 1980.

== Career ==
In 1970, King became manager and treasurer of the newly founded Franklin Community Federal Credit Union (FCFCU), supporting low income households in the African American community of Omaha, Nebraska. In 1972, he earned a degree in bachelor's degree in business administration from the University of Nebraska Omaha. In 1974, King also became president of the Consumer Service Organization, Inc. In 1979, he became a director of the Franklin Housing Corporation.

Under King's leadership, FCFCU was promoted as a model community-based credit union. Over the next decade, King became extremely active in Omaha civic life, serving on boards of dozens of local charities and church organizations. He earned a reputation as an ambitious, charismatic figure. King was also known for his love of music and often performed as a singer.

In addition to FCFCU, King owned several bars and restaurants in Omaha.

== Political activism ==
In the early 1980s, King had become a rising star in the Republican Party. As chairperson of the Nebraska Black Republican Council in 1982, King was credited in official White House communications with "com[ing] into a very fragmented organization and pull[ing] it together in a very short period of time."

His success drew attention from national Republican leaders. He was appointed vice chair of the National Black Republican Council (an affiliate of the Republican National Committee) and served on the advisory committee for President Ronald Reagan's second inauguration.

King was also a featured performer at high-profile Republican events, notably singing the national anthem at the 1984 Republican National Convention in Dallas.

== Franklin Credit Union collapse ==
In 1988, King's success came to an abrupt end when federal regulators uncovered widespread malfeasance at the FCFCU. On November 4, 1988, the National Credit Union Administration (NCUA) raided and shut down the FCFCU after uncovering a massive embezzlement scheme, in which King kept a secret set of books and sold fraudulent certificates of deposit to inflate the credit union's assets. According to lawsuits filed by the NCUA, about $34 to 40 million in funds (approximately $80 to 94 million in 2025 dollars) were unaccounted for, making FCFCU one of the largest credit union failures in US history.

Contemporary reporting detailed King's lavish lifestyle, which contrasted with the credit union's ostensible mission of community service. Despite a modest official salary, King lived in affluence, using chartered private jets and limousines and maintaining a $5,000 per month home ($14,000 in 2025 dollars) along Embassy Row in Washington, D.C. He drove a new Mercedes-Benz and spent freely on luxury clothing, jewelry, and entertainment. In late 1988, a federal judge froze King's assets and appointed a receiver after concluding that the missing millions in funds were at risk of being hidden or dissipated. King denied any wrongdoing, insisting that he had financed his extravagant lifestyle with legitimate income, but he refused media interviews.

=== Trial and conviction ===
In 1989, King and several associates were indicted for financial crimes related to the credit union's failure. Faced with overwhelming evidence, King pleaded guilty in 1991 to embezzling approximately $39 million from Franklin accounts, and he was sentenced to 15 years in prison for fraud. NCUA officials ultimately tallied the credit union's losses at nearly $40 million.

== Child abuse and sex trafficking allegations ==
Shortly after the credit union's collapse, rumors emerged that some of the missing Franklin money had been used to finance the commercial sexual exploitation of children. In November and December 1988, the Nebraska Foster Care Review Board provided a dossier of reports to Nebraska government officials, alleging that children in foster care had been abused at parties attended by elites. The alleged victims accused King of procuring and abusing children personally and flying minor children to sex parties in various U.S. cities, where they were "auctioned off" as sexual slaves, drugged, and forced into illegal sex acts. These allegations depicted King as a central ringleader, but by early 1989, dozens of prominent Nebraskans and national political figures were implicated in rumors as possible co-conspirators.

King categorically denied the accusations, dismissing them as "garbage" and claiming he was being framed. Nevertheless, the allegations gained traction, and in January 1989, the Nebraska Legislature established an investigative panel to examine both the credit union's financial failure and the emerging child abuse allegations. The panel, known as the Franklin Committee, was chaired by Loran Schmit with Ernie Chambers as vice-chair. They hired a private investigator, Gary Caradori, and Omaha police, the Nebraska State Patrol, the Federal Bureau of Investigation, and federal prosecutors all also opened inquiries into the alleged child prostitution ring.

During 1989, Caradori and the committee interviewed purported victims and witnesses. At least six young adults, most former wards of the state or of the Boys Town home, alleged abuse at the hands of King and others. They claimed that, as minors in the early 1980s, they had attended lavish parties in Omaha and elsewhere, and at these parties, children were molested by older men, prominent officials, and businessmen. The Committee also heard testimony accusing King and his associates of drug trafficking and even arms trafficking backed by the Central Intelligence Agency. Media coverage of the case intensified in 1989 and 1990. In April 1990, The Washington Post ran a long column on the affair under the headline "Omaha's Hurricane of Scandal."

In July 1990, Caradori and his 8-year-old son were killed in a small-plane crash. The crash immediately drew suspicion. The plane had mysteriously broken apart in mid-air, and Caradori's briefcase, which allegedly contained new evidence and photographs said to implicate King, was missing from the crash. Caradori's death, combined with anonymous threats against King's accusers, led several key witnesses to recant their stories. Both the FBI and Nebraska authorities came to view the allegations as potentially fabricated, and they warned witnesses that making false reports could lead to perjury charges.

=== Trial ===
In July 1990, after months of testimony, a state grand jury in Douglas County concluded that the allegations of a child sex ring were unfounded. In a sharply worded report, the grand jury declared the affair a "carefully crafted hoax." In September, a federal grand jury reached the same conclusion. The grand jurors did not identify an origin or engineer behind the alleged hoax, but they took the remarkable step of indicting two accusers for perjury. One indictment remained sealed but was widely reported to indict Paul Bonacci; prosecutors later dropped the case. In 1999, Bonacci successfully sued King in civil court and won a default judgment when King failed to provide a defense, which many speculated was done to avoid providing incriminating evidence through discovery. The judge awarded Bonacci a $1 million judgment in 1999, although this money was never paid.

The other indictment was against Alisha Owen, a 21-year-old woman who had been a foster child and one of the chief accusers against King. Owen was ultimately convicted of perjury in 1991 and sentenced to 9 to 15 years in prison. Her sentence was notably harsh for a perjury case, reflecting the court's view that her accusations had caused enormous reputational harm. Owen served over four years in prison before being paroled in the 1990s.

=== Cover-up allegations ===
In 1992, former Nebraska senator John DeCamp published The Franklin Cover-Up, which fiercely criticized the official investigations and claimed that a political cover-up had hidden the truth of King's child exploitation ring. DeCamp's book (and later works by other authors) alleged that King's crimes went far beyond financial fraud, portraying him as the linchpin of a nationwide child-trafficking network with links to Washington power brokers. DeCamp's claims were never substantiated by any court or law enforcement agency, but they kept conspiracy theories about the Franklin case alive in some circles.

In 1993, a British television documentary titled Conspiracy of Silence investigated the Franklin allegations but never aired, which conspiracy proponents interpreted as further evidence of a cover-up.

== Later life ==
King served about 10 years in federal prison and was released in the early 2000s. Upon his release, King kept a very low profile, avoiding publicity and declining interviews. A 2023 CNN report on the enduring mysteries of the Franklin scandal noted that King declined to respond to inquiries.
