= Temple of Set =

Occult religious organization founded in 1975

- Abbreviation: ToS
- Type: Occult
- Classification: Religious organization, magical order
- Orientation: Western esotericism
- Scripture: The Book of Coming Forth by Night
- Theology: Setianism
- Governance: Priesthood
- Structure: Initiatory order
- Founder: Michael A. Aquino
- Origin: 1975; San Francisco, California
- Separated from: Church of Satan (1975)
- Tax status: Exempt
- Official website: xeper.info

The Temple of Set (ToS) is an occult religious organization founded in 1975. A new religious movement and form of Western esotericism, the Temple espouses a religion known as Setianism, whose practitioners are called Setians. This is sometimes identified as a form of Satanism.

The Temple was established in the United States in 1975 by Michael A. Aquino, an American political scientist, military officer, and a high-ranking member of Anton LaVey's Church of Satan. Dissatisfied with LaVey's materialistic approach, abolition of regional groups, and commercialization of Church degrees, Aquino resigned and—according to his own claim—embarked on a ritual to invoke Satan, who revealed to him a sacred text called The Book of Coming Forth by Night. According to Aquino, in this work Satan revealed his true name to be that of Set, which had been used by his followers in ancient Egypt. Aquino was joined in establishing the Temple by a number of other dissatisfied members of LaVey's Church, and soon various Setian groups were established across the United States.

Setians believe that Set is the one real god and that he has aided humanity by giving them a questioning intellect, the "Black Flame", which distinguishes them from other animal species. Set is held in high esteem as a teacher whose example is to be emulated, but he is not worshipped as a deity. Highly individualistic in basis, the Temple promotes the idea that practitioners should seek self-deification and thus attain an immortality of consciousness. Setians believe in the existence of magic as a force that can be manipulated through ritual; however, the nature of these rituals is not prescribed by the Temple. Specifically, Aquino described Setian practices as "black magic", a term which he defines idiosyncratically.

Following initiation into the Temple, a Setian can proceed along a series of six degrees, each of which requires greater responsibilities to the group; as a result, most members remain in the first two degrees. Governed by a high priest or high priestess and a wider Council of Nine, the Temple is also divided into groups known as pylons, through which Setians can meet or correspond in order to advance their magical work in a particular area. Pylons of the Temple are now present in the United States, Australia, and Europe, with estimates placing the Temple's average membership at 500.

== Definition ==
The Temple of Set is a new religious movement, and draws upon earlier forms of Western esotericism. Among academic scholars of religious studies, there has been some debate as to whether the Temple of Set can be characterized as "Satanism" or not. The religious studies scholars Asbjorn Dyrendal, Massimo Introvigne, James R. Lewis, and Jesper Aa. Petersen describe the Temple of Set as a Satanic group, despite its reluctance to use the term "Satanism", because it is an offshoot of the Church of Satan which continues to use satanic mythology. Conversely, the scholar Kennet Granholm argued that it should not be considered a form of Satanism because it does not place an emphasis on the figure of Satan. Granholm acknowledged that it was an "actor in the Satanic milieu" and part of the wider left-hand path group of esoteric traditions. He suggested that it could also be seen as a form of "Post-Satanism", thereby continuing to reflect its historical origins within religious Satanism.

The Temple of Set is far more rooted in esoteric ideas than the Church of Satan had been. It has thus been termed "Esoteric Satanism", a term used to contrast it with the "Rational Satanism" found in LaVeyan Satanism. Accordingly, it has been labelled the "intellectual wing of esoteric Satanism", with the Temple presenting itself as an intellectual religion. Aquino possessed a Ph.D. in political science and this formal education was reflected in the way that he presented his arguments, in which he draws broadly upon Western philosophy and science.

== History ==
=== Foundation ===
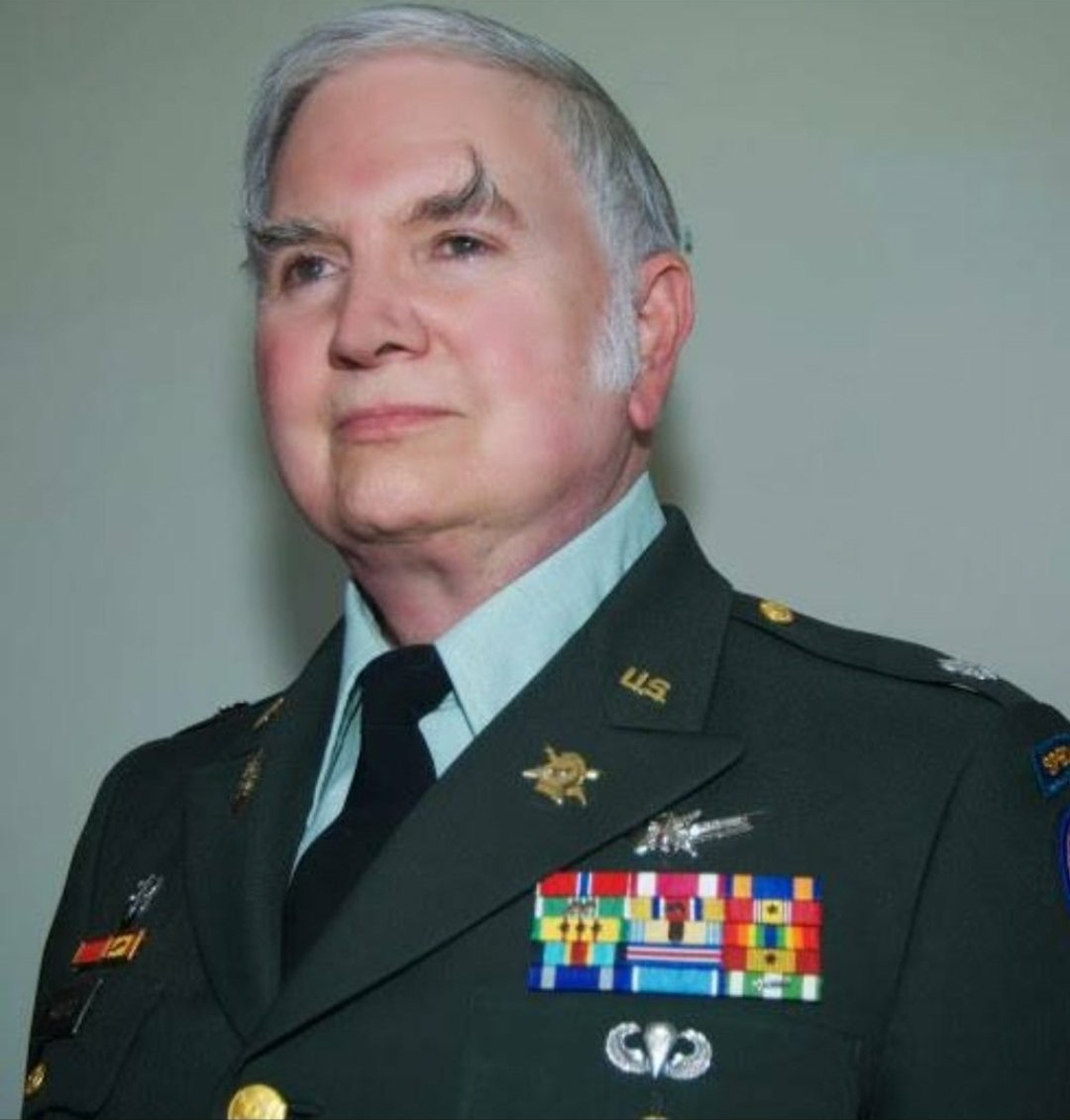
Michael A. Aquino

Born in 1946, Michael A. Aquino was a military intelligence officer specializing in psychological warfare. In 1969 he joined Anton LaVey's Church of Satan and rose rapidly through the group's ranks. In 1970, while he was serving with the U.S. military during the Vietnam War, Aquino was stationed in Bến Cát in South Vietnam when he wrote a tract titled "Diabolicon" in which he reflected upon his growing divergence from the Church of Satan's doctrines. In this tract, teachings about the creation of the world, God, and humanity are presented, as is the dualistic idea that Satan complements God. The character of Lucifer is presented as bringing insight to human society, a depiction of Lucifer that was inherited from John Milton's seventeenth-century epic poem Paradise Lost. By 1971, Aquino was ranked as a Magister Caverns of the IV° within the Church's hierarchy, was editor of its publication The Cloven Hoof, and sat on its governing Council of Nine. In 1973, he rose to the previously unattained rank of Magister Templi of IV°. According to Satanism scholars Per Faxneld and Jesper Petersen, Aquino had effectively become LaVey's "right-hand man".

Nonetheless, there were things that Aquino disliked about the Church of Satan; he thought that it had attracted many "fad-followers, egomaniacs, and assorted oddballs, whose primary interest in becoming Satanists was to flash their membership cards for cocktail-party notoriety". In 1975, when LaVey abolished the system of regional groups, or grottos, and declared that in the future all degrees would be given in exchange for financial or other contributions to the Church, Aquino became increasingly disaffected; he resigned from the organization on June 10, 1975. While LaVey seems to have held a pragmatic and practical view of the degrees and of the Satanic priesthood, intending them to reflect the social role of the degree holder within the organization, Aquino and his supporters viewed the priesthood as being spiritual, sacred and irrevocable. Dyrendal, Lewis, and Petersen describe Aquino as, in effect, accusing LaVey of the sacrilege of simony.

Aquino then provided what has been described as a "foundation myth" for his Setian religion. Having departed the Church, he embarked on a ritual intent on asking Satan for advice on what to do next. According to his account, at Midsummer 1975, Satan appeared and revealed that he wanted to be known by his true name, Set, which had been the name used by his worshippers in ancient Egypt. Aquino produced a religious text, The Book of Coming Forth by Night, which he alleged had been revealed to him by Set through a process of automatic writing. According to Aquino, "there was nothing overtly sensational, supernatural, or melodramatic about The Book of Coming Forth By Night working. I simply sat down and wrote it." The book proclaimed Aquino to be the Magus of the new Aeon of Set and the heir to LaVey's "infernal mandate". Aquino later stated that the revelation that Satan was Set necessitated his own exploration of Egyptology, a subject about which he had previously known comparatively little.

"The meeting with the Prince of Darkness marked a point of departure between LaVey and Aquino. LaVey was basically a materialist to whom Satan was a personification of the forces of nature. Aquino is an idealist, basing his theology on Plato and the Gnostic/Hermetic tradition."

— Historian of religion Mattias Gardell.

Aquino's Book of Coming Forth by Night makes reference to The Book of the Law, a similarly revealed text produced by the occultist Aleister Crowley in 1904 which provided the basis for Crowley's religion of Thelema. In Aquino's book, The Book of the Law was presented as a genuine spiritual text given to Crowley by preternatural sources, but it was also declared that Crowley had misunderstood both its origin and message. In making reference to The Book of the Law, Aquino presented himself as being as much Crowley's heir as LaVey's, and Aquino's work would engage with Crowley's writings and beliefs to a far greater extent than LaVey ever did.

In establishing the Temple, Aquino was joined by other ex-members of LaVey's Church, and soon Setian groups, or pylons, were established in various parts of the United States. The structure of the Temple was based largely on those of the ceremonial magical orders of the late nineteenth century, such as the Hermetic Order of the Golden Dawn and Ordo Templi Orientis. Aquino has stated that he believed LaVey was not merely a charismatic leader but had actually been appointed by Satan himself (referring to this charismatic authority as the "Infernal Mandate") to found the Church. After the split of 1975, Aquino believed LaVey had lost the mandate, which the "Prince of Darkness" then transferred to Aquino and a new organization, the Temple of Set. According to both the historian of religion Mattias Gardell and journalist Gavin Baddeley, Aquino displayed an "obsession" with LaVey after his departure from the Church, for instance by publicly releasing court documents that reflected negatively on his former mentor, among them restraining orders, divorce proceedings, and a bankruptcy filing. In turn, LaVey lampooned the new Temple as "Laurel and Hardy's Sons of the Desert". In 1975, the Temple was incorporated as a non-profit Church in California, and later that year secured state and federal recognition and tax-exempt status.

=== Later development ===
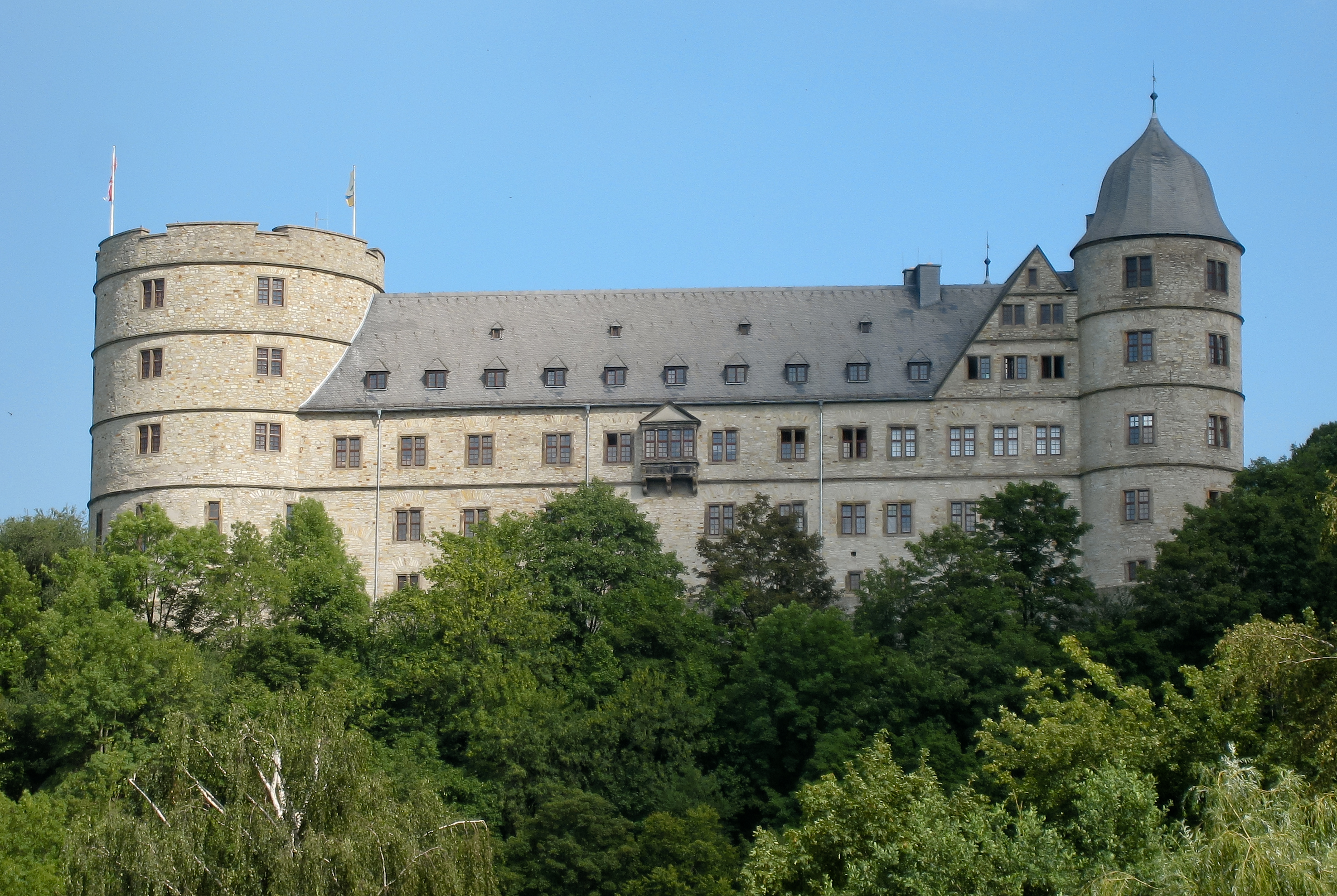
Aquino established his Order of the Trapezoid at Wewelsburg in Germany (pictured in 2010)

Many members of the Temple had voiced their opposition to Aquino's position of power within it. Aquino relinquished his office of High Priest in 1979 to Ronald Keith Barrett, who produced an inspired text of his own, titled The Book of Opening the Way. Barrett's approach was later criticized as "more mystical than magical" by Temple members. Barrett's leadership was also criticized as authoritarian, resulting in a decline in the Temple's membership. Barrett resigned his office and severed ties with the organization in May 1982. He subsequently established his own Temple of Anubis, which he led until his 1998 death; it survived until the early 2010s. After Barrett's departure, Aquino retook leadership of the Temple of Set. During this period, the sociologist Gini Graham Scott clandestinely participated in the Temple, using her observations as the basis for her 1983 book The Magicians: A Study of the Use of Power in a Black Magic Group.

After receiving his PhD in political science from the University of California, Santa Barbara in 1980, Aquino worked as an adjunct professor at Golden Gate University until 1986 while continuing to serve in the United States Army as an Active Guard Reserve officer at the Presidio of San Francisco. He was fascinated by the connections between occultism and Nazism, which led to accusations that he was sympathetic to Nazi ideology. In 1983, he performed a solitary rite at Walhalla, the subterranean section of the Wewelsburg castle in Germany that was utilized as a ceremonial space by the Schutzstaffel's Ahnenerbe group during the Nazi period. This resulted in his formation of the Order of the Trapezoid, lifting the name directly from the early governing body of the Church of Satan to repackage it as a Setian version whose members considered themselves a chivalric order of knights. From 1987 through to 1995, the Grand Master of the Order of the Trapezoid was Edred Thorsson, who had joined the Temple of Set in 1984 and risen to the Fifth Degree in 1990. Thorsson exerted a "discernible influence" over the Setian community through his books, in which he combined aspects of Satanic philosophy with the Modern Pagan religion of Heathenry. In 1980, he founded the Texas-based Rune-Gild The Ring of Troth, which shared many of the Temple's key philosophical tenets but with a focus on the study of runes and their applications in magical practice.

In the 1980s, Aquino attracted greater publicity for his Temple through appearances on television talk shows like The Oprah Winfrey Show and Geraldo. In 1987, during the Satanic ritual abuse hysteria, the three-year-old daughter of a Christian clergyman accused Aquino of sexually abusing her during Satanic rites held at his Russian Hill home. Responding to the allegations, police raided Aquino's home. However, after no evidence was found to substantiate the allegation and it was revealed that Aquino was living in Washington, D.C. at the time of the alleged abuse, the police dropped felony charges. Aquino attempted to bring formal charges against the chaplain and psychiatrist who had encouraged the girl's claims, although he was more successful in bringing legal action against two books—Carl A. Raschke's Painted Black and Linda Blood's The New Satanists—that had suggested that he was guilty. He then left the Presidio and was transferred to St. Louis. In 1994, Aquino retired from active service in the Army, being honourably transferred to the Retired Reserve and awarded the Meritorious Service Medal.

While the Satanic ritual abuse hysteria declined, Aquino continued to be a figure of prominence in "mind control" conspiracy theories because of his career as a psychological warfare officer in the US Army. In the United Kingdom during this same period, tabloids like the News of the World and Sunday Mirror published sensationalist articles about the Temple. In the mid-1990s, a group of British Setians approached the religious studies scholar Graham Harvey and encouraged him to conduct research into the group so as to combat misconceptions about them. The Temple first registered a website in 1997, the same year as the Church of Satan. It would also establish its own intranet, allowing for communication between Setians in different parts of the world.

One member of the Temple was the New Zealander Kerry Bolton, who split to form his own Order of the Left Hand Path in 1990. In 1995, another couple who joined were LaVey's daughter Zeena Schreck and her husband Nikolas Schreck, both of whom were vocal critics of Zeena's father.

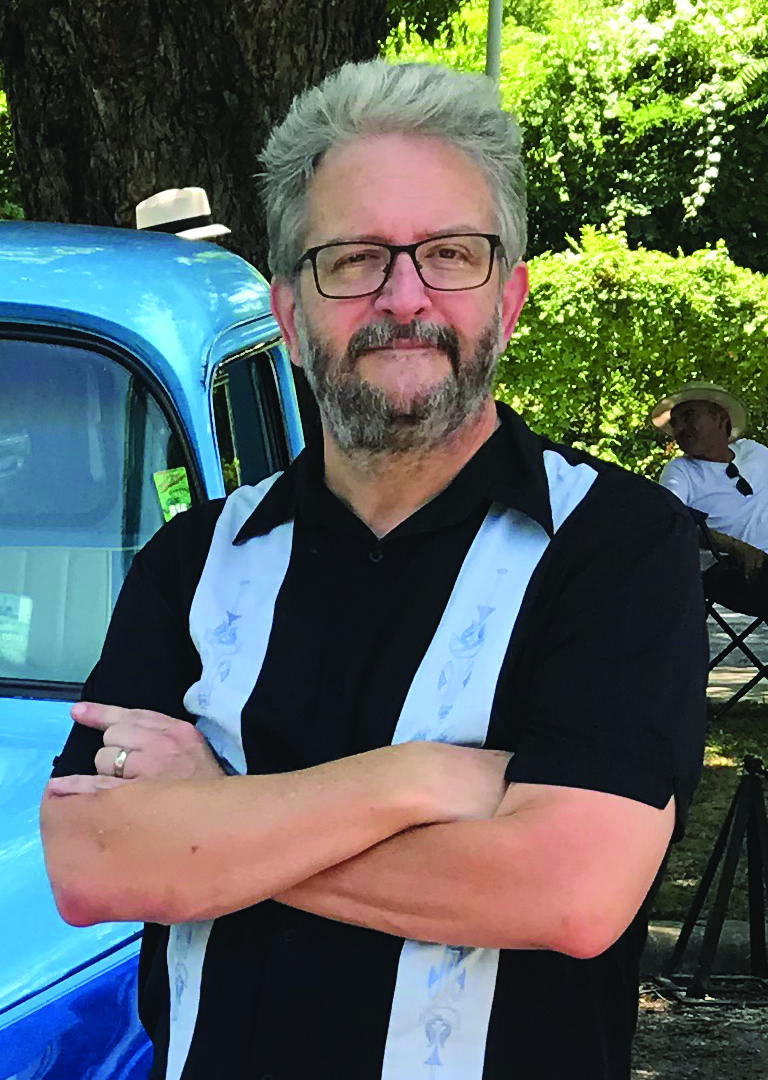
Don Webb

In 1996, Don Webb became the high priest of the Temple, a position that he held until 2002. He was replaced by Zeena Schreck, but she resigned after six weeks and was replaced by Aquino, who took charge once more. In that year, Zeena led a schism within the organization establishing her own Berlin-based group, The Storm, which she later renamed the Sethian Liberation Movement.

Aquino stood down as High Priest again in 2004, to be replaced by Patricia Hardy, who was elected to the position of High Priestess. Although no longer in charge of the organization, he nevertheless remained its most visible spokesperson.

Michael Aquino died on September 1, 2019.

== Ideology ==
=== Writings ===
In addition to the Book of Coming Forth by Night, in which Set himself is purported to speak, the Temple's philosophy and teachings are revealed in a series of occult writings titled the Jeweled Tablets of Set. Each tablet is keyed to a specific degree in the Temple hierarchy. Only the introduction to the first tablet (Crystal Tablet of Set), titled "Black Magic", is available for non-members. The Ruby Tablet, available to second-degree members, is the longest and most diverse of the tablets. The private Temple literature is not regarded as secret per se but is kept restricted because it contains materials which, according to the Temple, may be dangerous to the non-initiated.

=== Self-deification and Xeper ===
The human individual is at the centre of Setian philosophy. The Temple places great emphasis on the development of the individual, postulating self-deification as the ultimate goal. The realization of the true nature of the Setian is termed "becoming" or "coming into being" and is represented by the Egyptian hieroglyphic term kheper, or "Xeper" (a phonetic form of Xpr), as the Temple of Set prefers to write it. This term is described in The Book of Coming Forth by Night as "the Word of the Aeon of Set". Members attempt "to preserve and strengthen" their "isolated, psyche-centric existence" through adherence to the left-hand path. This idea is in opposition to the traditional goal of Hermeticism and Western mystical practices, which is the surrendering of the ego into a union with either God or the universe.

The Temple teaches that the true self, or essence, is immortal, and Xeper is the ability to align consciousness with this essence. Aquino taught that there is an afterlife for those who have reached the necessary level of individual development. This afterlife could occur in the individual's subjective universe. Those unable to reach this level dissolve into non-existence when the physical body dies. Self-initiation is knowledge understood as a conjunction of intellect and intuition. In keeping with its emphasis on the individual, the Temple encourages their members to celebrate their own birthday, and does not prescribe any other calendar of religious festivities.

Barrett presented Xem as his Aeonic Word to the Setians, presenting it as a natural and necessary further development of Aquino's Xeper. Aquino later acknowledged Xem as a worthwhile magical concept for Setians to explore, but found Barrett's insistence on its exclusivity as incompatible with the Temple's individualistic philosophy.

=== Set ===
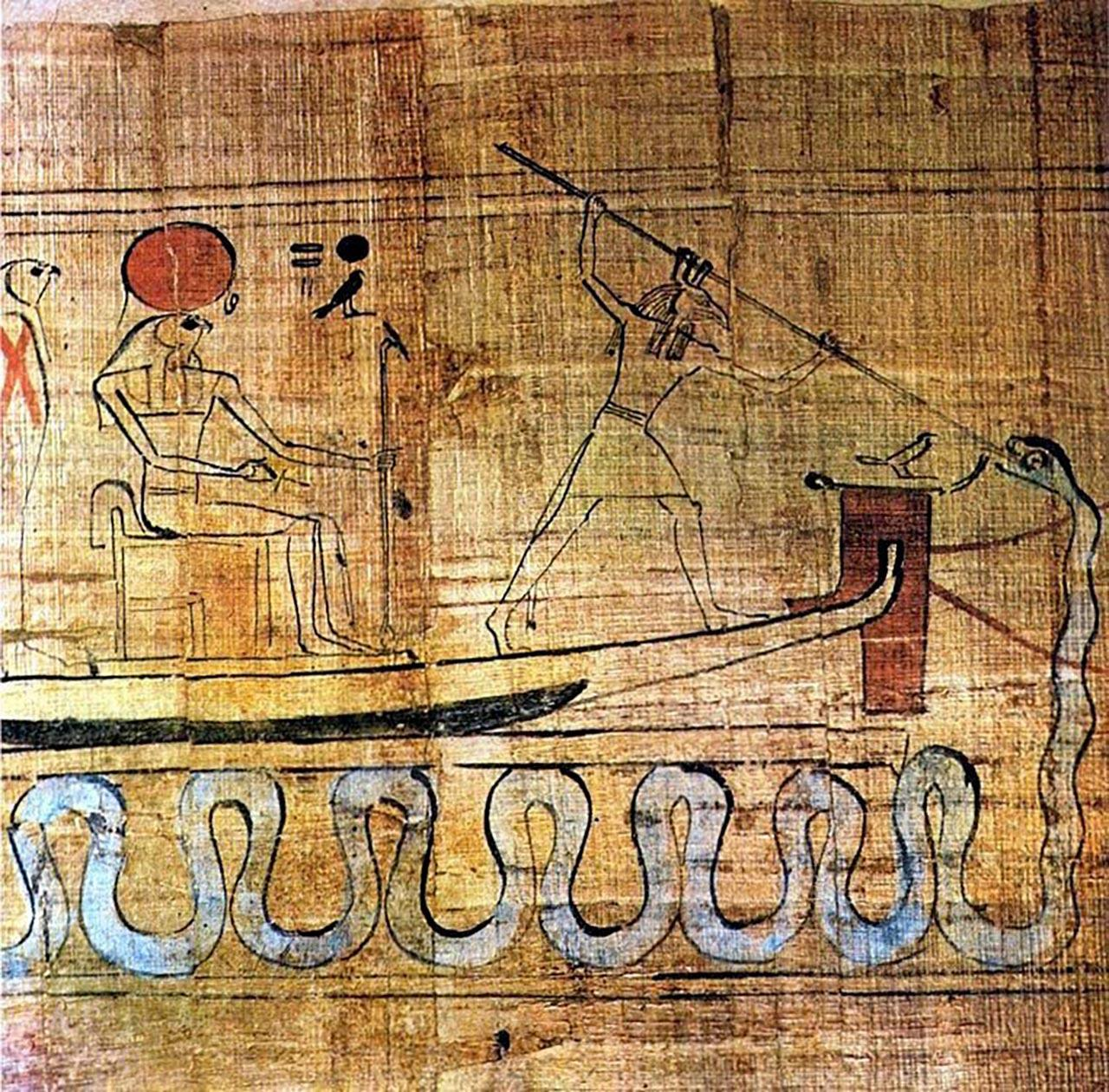
Set spearing the snake Apep (Egyptian Museum, Cairo)

Aquino's understanding of Satan differed from the atheistic interpretation promoted by LaVey, and the Temple's theology differs from that of the Church of Satan. The Temple states that the name Satan was originally a corruption of the name Set. The Temple of Set promotes the idea that Set is a real entity, and accordingly has been described as being "openly theistic". It further argues that Set is ageless and is the only real god in existence, with all others having been created by the human imagination. Set is described as having given humanity—through the means of non-natural evolution—the "Black Flame" or the "Gift of Set". This refers to humanity's questioning intellect, which sets the species apart from other animals and gives it an "isolate self-consciousness" and the possibility of attaining divinity. Aquino argued that the idea of the Gift of Set was inadvertently promoted to a wider audience in Stanley Kubrick's 1968 film 2001: A Space Odyssey. According to Aquino, the black monolith, which imparts human-level intelligence onto prehistoric apes in the film, was a symbol of Set.

While Setians are expected to revere Set, they do not worship him; instead, they regard him as a teacher and a guide. He is portrayed as a role model on which Setians can base their own deification. According to Webb, "we do not worship Set - only our own potential. Set was and is the patron of the magician who seeks to increase his existence through expansion."

Embracing the idea of aeons from Crowley's Thelema, Aquino adopted the Crowleyan tripartite division between the Aeon of Isis, Aeon of Osiris, and Aeon of Horus, but added to that the Aeon of Satan, which he dates from 1966 to 1975, and then the Aeon of Set, which he dated from 1975 onward. Despite presenting these chronological parameters, Aquino also portrayed the aeons less as time periods and more as mindsets that can co-exist alongside one another. Thus, he stated that "A Jew, Christian or Muslim exists in the Æon of Osiris, a Wiccan in that of Isis, and a Thelemite in that of Horus".

=== Magic ===
Aquino placed emphasis on what he deemed the division between the objective and subjective universes. In the Setian religion, the objective world is understood as representing the natural world and humanity's collective meaning systems, while the subjective universe is understood as the individually experienced world and individual meaning systems. Following earlier esotericists like Crowley, Aquino characterized magic as "causing change in accordance with will". Unlike LaVey, Aquino expressed belief in the division between black magic and white magic. He described white magic as "a highly-concentrated form of conventional religious ritual", characterizing it as being "more versatile", "less difficult", and "less dangerous" than black magic. However, he criticized white magic as "fraud and/or self-delusion," which deceives consciousness into believing it has been accepted in the objective universe.

Aquino divided black magic into two forms: lesser black magic and greater black magic. He stated that lesser black magic entails "impelling" things that exist in the "objective universe" into doing a desired act by using "obscure physical or behavioral laws" and into this category he placed stage magic, psychodramas, politics, and propaganda. Conversely, he used the term greater black magic in reference to changes in the subjective universe of the magician, allowing them to realize their self in accordance with the principle of Xeper. Among Setians it is accepted that there may be changes in the objective universe as a result of greater black magic, but such effects are considered secondary to the impact that they have upon the subjective universe.

Within the Temple, rituals are typically known as "workings", and are most often carried out alone. Stressing the religion's individualist nature, there are no rituals that are specifically prescribed by the Temple. Aquino also emphasized that in order to achieve a desired aim, the Setian should carry out physical actions alongside magical ones. There are no regular occasions that are marked by fixed rituals, and the Temple has no calendar of festivals.

== Insignia ==
The Temple uses an inverted pentagram as its insignia, known as the "Pentagram of Set" to Setians. The use of the geometric shape is derived from the Sigil of Baphomet used by the Church of Satan, although stripped of its overtly Satanic add-ons. The Temple explains the meaning and significance of the pentagram by referring to Pythagorean ideas and "mathematical perfection". At Setian gatherings, members wear the pentagram as a medallion. The medallion is colored according to the initiation degree of the Setian.

Both the Church of Satan and the Temple of Set also use the trapezoid symbol. The version used by the Church includes flames, a pitchfork and the number 666, while the trapezoid of the Temple has a left-facing Egyptian sceptre, and the number 666 stylized in geometric shapes rather than as clear numbers.

== Structure ==
The internal structure of the Temple of Set is closely reminiscent of that of the Church of Satan as it existed in the 1970s.

=== Degrees ===
All members of the Temple must be affiliated with a pylon, and thus membership is by application, requiring contact with a Setian priestess or priest followed by an evaluation period. The participation of non-initiated in the Temple's rituals are forbidden, due to the belief that their rituals would be dangerous in the wrong hands.

The Temple of Set recognizes several stages or degrees of initiation. The degrees indicate the individual Setian's development and skill in magic. The degree structure is based on that of the Church of Satan, which in turn was based on the degrees of a nineteenth-century occult group, the Hermetic Order of the Golden Dawn. The Temple terms the progression through degrees as "recognitions", because the organization's philosophy sees that the individual member initiates themselves and that the Temple merely acknowledges this by granting the degree. These degrees are:

1. Setian (First Degree)
2. Adept (Second Degree)
3. Priest / Priestess of Set (Third Degree)
4. Magister / Magistra Templi (Fourth Degree)
5. Magus / Maga (Fifth Degree)
6. Ipsissimus / Ipsissima (Sixth Degree)

The priesthood of the Temple of Set consists of members holding the third degree or higher; those in the first and second degrees are considered "lay members" of the Temple. The first degree serves as a space for mutual evaluation, in which the Temple assesses whether the individual is appropriate for the group, and the individual decides whether they wish to further their involvement with it. Full membership comes with recognition to the second degree. Many members do not advance beyond the second degree, nor is this expected of them, as while the first and second degree members use the organization's teachings and tools for their own development, the priesthood involves greater responsibilities towards the organization, such as being its official representatives.

Recognition is performed by members of the priesthood. The fourth degree, which is acknowledged by the high priest/priestess, entails that the individual is so advanced in their magical skills that they are able to found their own school of magic, represented in the different orders of the Temple. The fifth degree can only be awarded by the unanimous decision of the Council of Nine and by the approval of the Temple's high priest/priestess. A fifth degree member has the power to utter and define a concept which somehow affects the philosophy of the organization, such as the concept of Xeper defined by Aquino in 1975. Only a handful of members have attained this degree and most "fifth-degree" concepts defined in such a manner are no longer studied in the organization. The final sixth degree represents a Magus "whose Task is complete". This degree is held by a very select few in the Temple, although any fifth-degree member can assume the sixth degree based on their own assessment.

=== Leadership ===
The organization is led by a high priest/priestess, who is also the public face of the Temple. The high priest is chosen among fourth or higher degree members by the chairman of the Council of Nine. This ruling council has nine members chosen from the priesthood (third degree or higher), whose mandate lasts for nine years with a new member being elected every year. The chairman of the council is chosen from among the council members each year. The council has the ultimate ruling power in the Temple and even the high priest is responsible to it. The Temple also has an executive director, whose task is to deal with administrative issues.

Since its founding in 1975, the temple has had the following high priests/priestesses:

- Michael A. Aquino (1975–1979, 1982–1996, 2002–2004)
- Ronald K. Barrett (1979–1982)
- Don Webb (1996–2002)
- Zeena Schreck (2002)
- Patricia Hardy (2004–2013)
- James Fitzsimmons (2013–present)

=== Pylons, elements, and orders ===
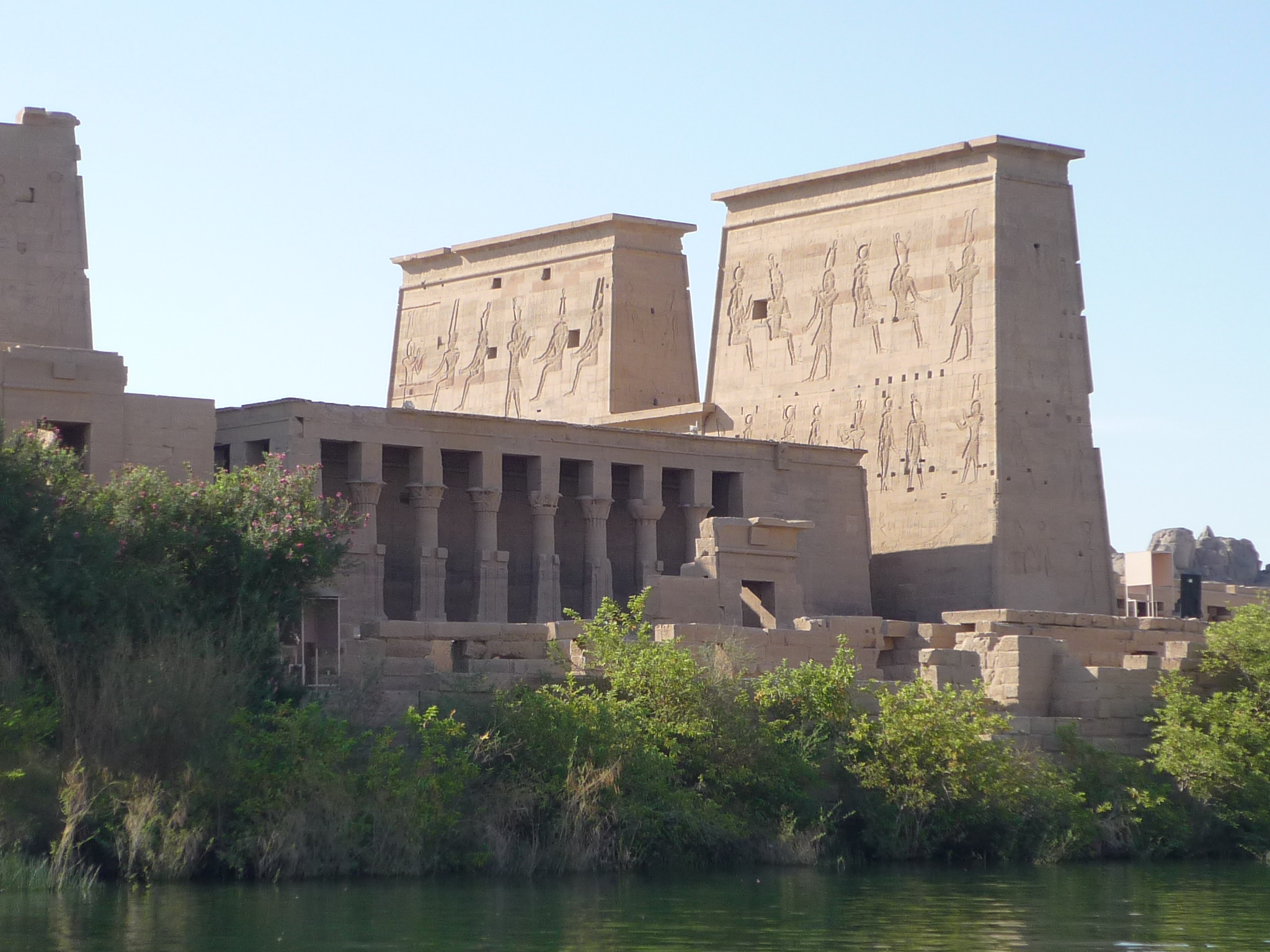
Setian groups, or pylons, are named after the fortified gateways to ancient Egyptian temples (pictured here at the Isis Temple on Philae Island)

In addition to the international organization, the Temple sponsors initiatory Orders and Elements and local groups called Pylons. Pylons are intended to facilitate the initiatory work of the Temple's members by conducting meetings where discussions and magical works take place. The purpose of a pylon is to provide a space in which the Setian can focus on their religion, aided by like-minded individuals. Pylons typically meet in a member's home. Members usually join the Pylon located geographically closest to them. Correspondence- or Internet-based Pylons also exist, with Harvey noting that this online networking is more common than in-person interaction. A Pylon is led by a second-degree (or higher) member who is called a Sentinel. The term pylon derives from the architectural features which served as fortified gateways to ancient Egyptian temples. One Finnish Setian informed Granholm that the relationship between the orders and the temple was like that of different departments in a university.

Elements are loosely structured interest groups, where specific themes and issues are addressed. They can be open for non-members and are commonly in operation only for short periods. Topics of interest include, for example, animal rights, which was the subject of the Arkte element operated by Aquino's wife Lilith.

There are sections of the Temple known as Orders, each of which focus on a particular theme, for instance ancient Egypt, Norse culture, Tantric Hinduism, or vampirism. Others focus on a particular skill, for instance the Order of Uart focuses on the visual arts and the Order of Taliesin on music. Orders can be understood as schools of different aspects of magic providing different paths of initiation. Orders are led by grand masters, who will usually be the founder of the order. In longer-lived orders the founder may have a successive grand master. Orders are founded by members of the fourth degree. When members reaches the second degree of initiation, they are expected to join an order of their own choosing. In normal circumstances, a Setian is only permitted to join one order, however special dispensation can be obtained for a practitioner to join two.

Setians also hold annual International Conclaves. First Degree Initiates who obtain sponsorship by a member of the Priesthood are permitted to attend the International Conclave and Regional Gatherings.

== Demographics ==
In 2000, the Temple had thirteen pylons, which were operating in the United States, Australia, Germany, and across Sweden and Finland. The extent of the Temple's membership has not been publicly revealed by the group; however, in 2005 Petersen noted that academic estimates for the Temple's membership varied from between 300 and 500, and Granholm suggested that in 2007 the Temple contained circa 200 members. The Temple's members come from a variety of racial backgrounds.

In 1999, the anthropologist Jean La Fontaine suggested that in Britain there were 100 members of the Temple at most, and possibly "considerably fewer". In 2001 the scholar Gareth Medway posited that the group had 70 to 80 members in the United Kingdom, adding that it was the largest Satanic group then active in the country. In 2009, Harvey concurred with La Fontaine's assessment, although still believed that it was the largest Satanic group in the United Kingdom. He noted that most members were male, between the ages of twenty and fifty, and that—despite his expectation that they might be political extremists—they endorsed mainstream political positions, with all those whom he communicated with stating that they had voted for either the Conservative Party, Labour Party, or Liberal Democrats.

== See also ==
- Kemetism
- Theistic Satanism
