= Michael A. Aquino =

American Satanist (1946–2019)

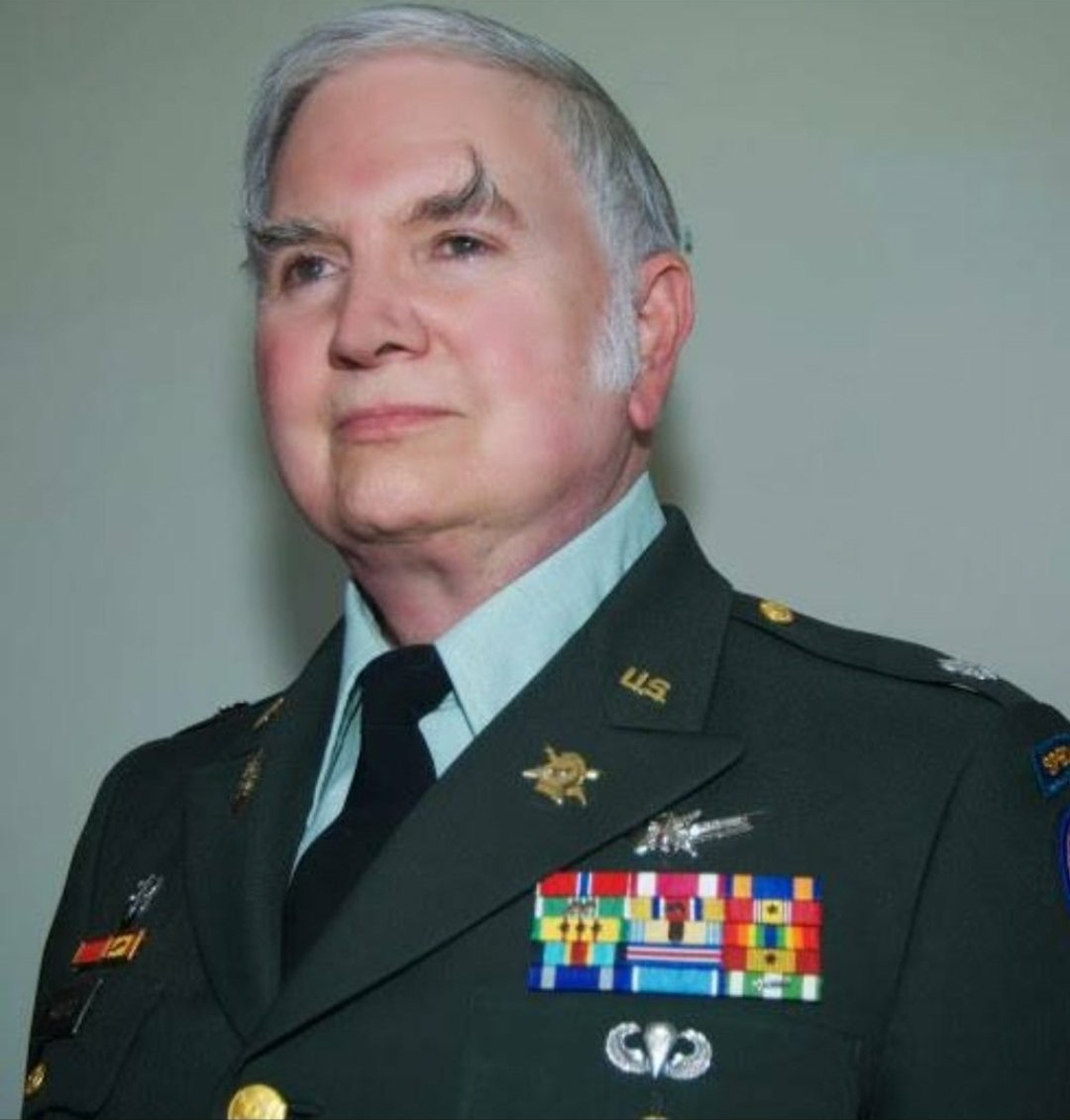
- Undated photo of Aquino
- Title: High Priest

Personal life
- Born: Michael A. Aquino Jr. October 16, 1946 San Francisco, California, U.S.
- Died: September 1, 2019 (aged 72)
- Spouse: Lilith Sinclair
- Education: University of California, Santa Barbara
- Known for: Temple of Set

Religious life
- Religion: Theistic Satanism
- Denomination: Temple of Set

Michael A. Aquino Jr. (October 16, 1946 – September 1, 2019) was an American political scientist, military officer and Satanist. He was the founder and high priest of the Temple of Set. Aquino was also a specialist in psychological warfare for military intelligence and an officer in the U.S. Army.

== Early life and education ==
Michael A. Aquino Jr. was born on October 16, 1946 in San Francisco, California. His parents were Michael A. Aquino Sr. and Betty Ford. He was an Eagle Scout graduate of Santa Barbara High School (later serving as a national commander of the Eagle Scout Honor Society) in 1964 before enrolling at the nearby University of California, Santa Barbara (UCSB), where he received a bachelor's degree in political science as an ROTC United States Army Distinguished Military Graduate (conferring a then-elite Regular Army commission) in 1968. He returned to the institution after transitioning to United States Army Reserve service. He received a M.A. and a PhD in political science from the UCSB in 1976 and 1980, respectively.

== Career ==
Following his commissioning in the Army, Aquino served as a psychological warfare specialist and was deployed in the Vietnam War. He served with the Green Berets and in the 1970s and early 1980s he was a part-time NATO liaison officer in several European countries. While off-duty on one of these tours, he visited Wewelsburg Castle, which was used by the SS and Heinrich Himmler, and performed a Satanic ritual there. Aquino stated that his interest in Nazism was academic and denied that he was racist. The journalist Linda Goldston quoted him as saying: "I'm fascinated by the lessons to be learned from the Nazi experience but not blinded by their excesses," and "There was a small group of brutal and desperate men who governed a country through despotism and tyranny. They were quite brilliant in some respects, yet utterly savage in others."

Upon receiving his doctorate in 1980, Aquino returned to his native San Francisco, where he served for the next six years as an Active Guard Reserve officer at the Presidio of San Francisco. He also taught at Golden Gate University until 1986. In 1981, Aquino was a reserve attaché at the Defense Intelligence Agency (DIA), and a year later he was a student at the Foreign Service Institute, sponsored by the United States Department of State. As an intelligence officer, he thus gained access to top-secret documents. He later worked as a program analyst at the US Army's Reserve Personnel Center in St. Louis, Missouri, where he was responsible for human resources issues. Prior to entering his doctoral program, he briefly worked at Merrill Lynch and obtained a license to trade securities on the New York Stock Exchange.

== Satanism ==
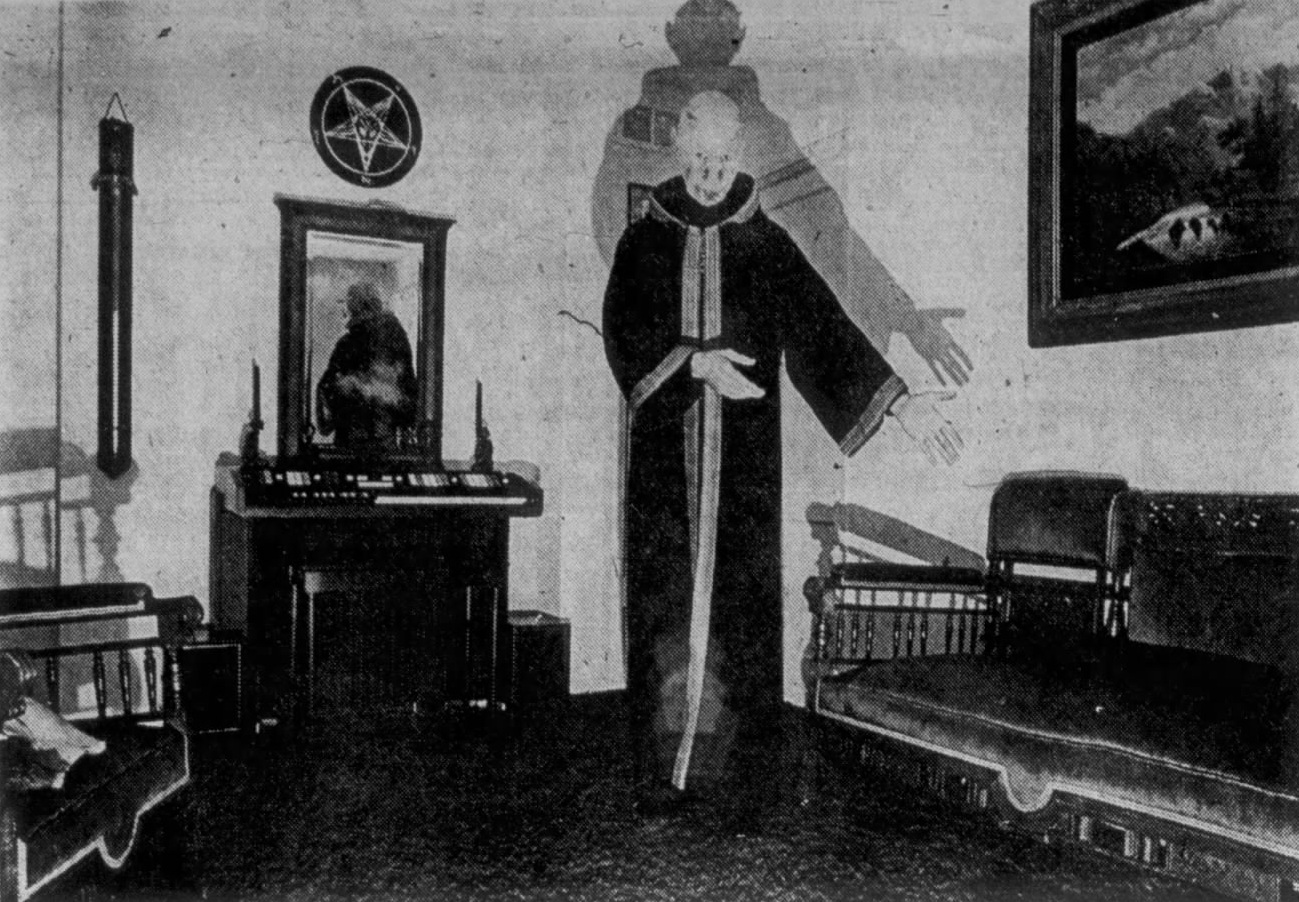
Aquino dressed for a demonstration Satanic ritual in 1973

In 1969, he joined the Church of Satan (CoS), led by Anton LaVey, and quickly rose through the ranks of the group. By 1971, Aquino had been appointed Magister Caverns of the IV degree within the church hierarchy, was the editor of the publication The Cloven Hoof, and sat on the governing council of the nine. His career in Satanism was paused when he went on to work in the military. He met LaVey at a screening of Rosemary's Baby, where LaVey gave him his business card. They grew to be very close.

While stationed in Kentucky, Aquino organized a "grotto" (local chapter) of the CoS in Louisville, rising in the ranks to become the CoS's senior coordinator of grottos generally. Aquino married a fellow CoS member, Lilith Sinclair. However, conflicts arose over time between LaVey and Aquino regarding the direction of the group. The latter rejected LaVey's atheism and materialism. When LaVey started selling positions in the Church of Satan for money, Aquino finally left the group in 1975. He later extensively criticized LaVey and, according to scholars, went "out of his way to make public court documents that reflect negatively on LaVey’s personal life". His history of the Church of Satan, entitled The Church of Satan, has had several editions and has been an important source for academics, though how reliable Aquino is has been questioned.

After he left the Church of Satan, he started a ritual in which he asked Satan for advice on what to do next. According to him, Satan appeared to him in the summer of 1975 and revealed to him that he wanted to be called Set, a name that his worshippers in ancient Egypt are said to have used. Aquino produced a religious text, The Book of Coming Forth by Night, which he claimed was revealed to him by Set in a process of automatic writing. In the book, Aquino proclaimed himself Magus of the new eon of Set, and heir to LaVey's "infernal mandate". On this basis, he founded the Temple of Set, which is dedicated to the worship of Set. In contrast to LaVey's approach, this group has an occult and hermetic orientation. Aquino's orientation was strongly influenced by the work of the British occultist Aleister Crowley. In 1975, the Temple of Set was registered as a non-profit church in California and received state and federal recognition and tax exemption that same year.

== Child molestation allegations ==
Concurrent with the Satanic panic, in November 1986, the San Francisco Police began investigating allegations of sexual abuse in connection with the Army's Child Development Center at the Presidio of San Francisco. The center was led by Gary Hambright, who was resultingly charged in connection with child molestation. Aquino's involvement was alleged the next year, when, according to police claims, a three-year-old girl who had attended the center claimed that "two men dressed as women", who she identified as Aquino and Hambright, molested her in Aquino's home while Aquino's wife was present. An investigation against Aquino was launched, and materials in his house were seized, but it was closed after insufficient evidence was found. The Aquinos were in Washington, D.C., not California, during the period where the crime was alleged to have occurred. They also claimed to have never met Hambright. Aquino was never charged, and the case against Hambright was also dismissed.

A continuation board ended Aquino's full-time Active Guard Reserve contract in 1990; while Aquino said that he continued to serve as a decorated (by virtue of his Meritorious Service Medal) part-time space activities officer until his required superannuation under the U.S. Army's up-or-out statutes in 1994, this decision essentially forestalled any subsequent promotion or advancement of his military career. The Aquinos attempted to pursue legal action against those involved in promoting the claims against them. They later sued as a result of two books that implied he was guilty in the case: Painted Black by Carl Raschke and The New Satanists by Linda Blood. Blood was a former member of the Temple of Set; Aquino alleged the book defamed him and the Temple of Set. The case was settled out of court.

The investigation, in combination with his background in psychological warfare, led to Aquino becoming a frequent target of conspiracy theories. In particular he caught the attention of Cathy O'Brien, who, according to scholar Mattias Gardell, "identifies Aquino as a child-molesting mind-controller working for a satanic globalist conspiracy".

== Death ==
After a long illness, Aquino died on September 1, 2019 at 72 years of age.

== Publications ==
=== Psychological warfare ===
- From PSYOP to MindWar (1980, with Paul E. Vallely)
- The Neutron Bomb (1983)
- MindWar (2013)
- Mindstar (2015)
- Findfar (2017)

=== Satanism ===
- The Book of Coming Forth by Night (1975)
- The Wewelsburg Working (1982)
- The Church of Satan (1983; has several editions up to 2009)
- The Crystal Tablet of Set (1985)
- Black Magic (2010)
- Extreme Prejudice: The Presidio "Satanic Abuse" Scam (2014)
- The Church of Satan I (2015)
- The Church of Satan II (2015)
- The Temple of Set I (2016)
- The Temple of Set II (2016)
- IlluminAnX: Rosicrucianism Reawakened (2017)
- The Satanic Bible: 50th Anniversary ReVision (2018)
- Ghost Rides (2018, with Stanton LaVey, Diane LaVey)

=== Various ===
- FireForce: A Star Wars Parody (2016)
- Ode to Esme: Memoirs of Captain Nemo (2017)
