= Senator Persons =

Senator Persons may refer to:

- Enos Warren Persons (1836–1899), Wisconsin State Senate
- Henry H. Persons (1851–1925), New York State Senate

== See also ==
- Senator Person (disambiguation)
