= Cathy O'Brien (conspiracy theorist) =

American conspiracy theorist (born 1957)

- Born: Cathleen Ann O'Brien; December 4, 1957 (age 68); Muskegon, Michigan, U.S.
- Occupations: Writer, speaker
- Known for: Conspiracy theories, statements alleging victimization by CIA mind control project
- Children: 1
- Website: trance-formation.com

Cathy O'Brien (born December 4, 1957) is an American author who claims to have been a victim of a government mind control program called "Project Monarch", which she alleges was part of the CIA's Project MKUltra. O'Brien made these assertions in Trance Formation of America (1995) and Access Denied: For Reasons of National Security (2004), both of which she co-authored and self-published with her husband, Mark Phillips. According to scholars, there is no credible evidence for O'Brien's claims and there are numerous inconsistencies in her story.

== Conspiracy theories ==
In Trance Formation of America, O'Brien claims that, as a child, she was sexually abused first by her father and then by a network of child pornographers. Supposedly, she was then forced by the CIA to participate in Project Monarch, which she claims is a subsection of Project MKUltra and Project ARTICHOKE. According to O'Brien, under hypnosis she was able to recall memories of sexual abuse—of both herself and her daughter—by international pedophile rings, drug barons, and satanists, who allegedly used a form of "trauma based mind control programming" to make her a sex slave. Project Monarch was also written about in other conspiracy texts, such as John DeCamp's book The Franklin Cover-up about the Franklin scandal, which portrays "Project Monarch" as "a joint Central Intelligence Agency/military/satanist secret initiative that ritually brainwashed the children in the Franklin case, as well as children in many other cases, turning them into criminal automatons and sex slaves for political elites"; DeCamp names Michael A. Aquino as one of its alleged operatives.

O'Brien accuses a wide range of prominent people—from American, Canadian, Mexican, and Saudi Arabian government officials to stars of the country music scene—of being part of a Project Monarch conspiracy to operate sex slave rings and commit child abuse. For example, O'Brien claims that George H. W. Bush and Miguel de la Madrid used holograms to appear to her in altered forms, saying, "Bush apparently activated a hologram of the lizard-like 'alien,' which provided the illusion of Bush transforming like a chameleon before my eyes. In retrospect, I understand that Bush had been painstakingly careful in positioning our seats in order that the hologram's effectiveness be maximized."

O'Brien has claimed that Project Monarch caused her to develop dissociative identity disorder (formerly known as multiple personality disorder) but during alternate personality episodes, she has photographic recall. O'Brien's Trance Formation of America has been credited as originating "one of the most significant" and "extreme" mind control conspiracy theories, and her claim of links between satanic ritual abuse and MKUltra have influenced popular conspiracy culture.

Religious and political scholars have criticized O'Brien's claims for lacking any supporting evidence. David G. Robertson characterized them as symptomatic of "baseless" moral panic and wrote that "no-one has ever been prosecuted of such crimes nor has any corroborating material evidence ever been produced". According to scholar Michael Barkun, "scholarly and journalistic treatments of MKUltra make no mention of a "Project Monarch". Barkun describes O'Brien's account as "sensational even by the standards of conspiracy literature" and notes that even black helicopter conspiracy theorist Jim Keith considered it "fraudulent or delusional". Jodi Dean cited O'Brien's claims as an example of conspiracy theorists' "leaps in imagination and willingness to deviate from common sense".

== Bibliography ==
O'Brien self-publishes her books.

- O'Brien, Cathy; Phillips, Mark (1995). Trance Formation of America. Reality Marketing, Incorporated. ISBN 9780966016543.
- O'Brien, C (2004). Access Denied: For Reasons of National Security. Reality Marketing, Incorporated. ISBN 0-9660165-3-X.
- O'Brien, C (2017). PTSD: Time to Heal. Reality Marketing, Incorporated. ISBN 978-0-69277641-4.
