= Cap Dierks =

American politician (1932–2021)

Member of the Nebraska Legislature from the 40th district
- In office 2007–2011
- Preceded by: Doug Cunningham
- Succeeded by: Tyson Larson
- In office 1987–2003
- Preceded by: John DeCamp
- Succeeded by: Doug Cunningham

Personal details
- Born: July 2, 1932 O'Neill, Nebraska, U.S.
- Died: October 22, 2021 (aged 89) O'Neill, Nebraska, U.S.
- Party: non-partisan

Merton L. "Cap" Dierks (July 2, 1932 – October 22, 2021) was an American politician from the state of Nebraska. He served in the Nebraska Legislature from 1987 to 2003 and again from 2007 to 2011.

== Personal life ==
He was born on July 2, 1932, in O'Neill, Nebraska and graduated from Ewing High School, (Ewing, Nebraska) in 1950. He later graduated from the University of Nebraska College of Agriculture and served in the U.S. Air Force, (Strategic Air Command), from 1954 to 1956 before earning his D.V.M. from Kansas State University in 1961. He also operated, (since 1968), the family's ranching operation near Goose Lake, (35 miles south of O'Neill), as a 5th generation rancher. The ranch runs 600 cows, in the primarily cow/calf operation. He was married, (Gloria Zoeller), and has four children, (Jon, veterinarian, Tom, social worker, Chris, rancher and Stephanie, nurse), and eleven grandchildren.

Dierks died on October 22, 2021, at the age of 89.

== Career ==
Prior to being elected to the State Legislature, Dierks served on the Ewing Public Board of Education from 1969? to 1984, and returned to serve briefly on that board again from 2004 to 2006. He has also served on the Board of Directors for St. Anthony's Hospital in O'Neill, Nebraska, a member of the Knights of Columbus, a licensed pilot and was a member of, (and former president of), the Nebraska Veterinary Medical Association. Dierks was also a founding member of OCM, (the Organization For Competitive Markets), as well as R-Calf, (Ranchers-Cattlemen Action Legal Fund), and ICON, (Independent Cattlemen of Nebraska). Dierks was also an inductee into the Nebraska Hall of Agricultural Achievement in April, 2010, for his efforts in assisting Nebraska farmers and ranchers.

=== State legislature ===
Dierks was first elected to the Legislature in 1986 and was re-elected in 1990, 1994, and 1998 to represent the 40th Legislative District. Redistricting following the 2000 Census forced him to run against incumbent Doug Cunningham, in a district that was primarily previously represented by Cunningham. Cunningham won the election. When newly enacted term limits prevented Cunningham from seeking re-election in 2006, Dierks ran successfully, amid a field of three, for the seat.

Because Nebraska's legislative term limits deal only with consecutive terms, Dierks was eligible to seek another term in 2010. He ran, but was defeated by Tyson Larson of O'Neill.

In the legislature, Dierks sat on the Agriculture, Committee On Committees, General Affairs, Revenue, and State-Tribal Relations Committees.
