= Curt Bromm =

American lawyer and politician

Speaker of the Nebraska Legislature
- In office July 30, 2002 – January 5, 2005
- Preceded by: Doug Kristensen
- Succeeded by: Kermit Brashear

Member of the Nebraska Legislature from the 23rd district
- In office January 6, 1993 – January 5, 2005
- Preceded by: Loran Schmit
- Succeeded by: Chris Langemeier

Personal details
- Born: March 19, 1945 (age 81) Oakland, Nebraska
- Party: Republican
- Spouse: Vicki Nodlinski (m. 1968)
- Children: 5 (Jason, Jenefer, Jolin, Jina, Jarson)
- Education: University of Nebraska–Lincoln (B.A., J.D.)
- Occupation: Attorney

Military service
- Allegiance: United States
- Branch/service: United States Army
- Years of service: 1970

Curt Bromm (born March 19, 1945) is a Republican politician from Nebraska who served as Speaker of the Nebraska Legislature from 2002 to 2005 and as a member of the Nebraska Legislature from the 23rd district from 1993 to 2005.

== Early life ==
Bromm was born in 1945, in Oakland, Nebraska, and graduated from Tekamah High School. He graduated from the University of Nebraska–Lincoln in 1967 and the University of Nebraska College of Law in 1970, and served in the U.S. Army in 1970. Bromm joined a private law firm in Wahoo, and successfully ran for Saunders County Attorney in 1974, serving from 1975 to 1979. He served three terms on the Wahoo Board of Education.

== Nebraska Legislature ==
Bromm ran for the state legislature in 1992, challenging incumbent State Senator Loran Schmit for re-election in the 23rd district, which included Butler, Colfax, Cuming, Dodge, Platte, Polk, and Saunders counties. In the nonpartisan primary, Schmit placed first, winning 44 percent of the vote to Bromm's 32 percent, and they advanced to the general election. Bromm narrowly defeated Schmit, winning 52–48 percent.

In 1996, Bromm ran for re-election, and was challenged by Jack Pokorny, a basket maker. He placed first in the primary by a wide margin, receiving 72 percent of the vote to Pokorny's 28 percent. He won the general election by a landslide, winning 73 percent of the vote to Pokorny's 26 percent. Bromm was re-elected in 2000 without opposition.

During the 2002 legislative session, Speaker Doug Kristensen was appointed Chancellor of the University of Nebraska at Kearney, and resigned from the legislature. Bromm was unanimously elected as Kristensen's successor on July 30, 2002. He was re-elected as Speaker in 2003 without opposition.

== 2004 congressional campaign ==
In 2003, Republican Congressman Doug Bereuter announced that he would not seek re-election in the 1st congressional district, and Bromm ran to succeed him. Bereuter endorsed Bromm as his successor, and he emerged as one of the frontrunners in the race, along with businessman Greg Ruehle and Lincoln City Councilman Jeff Fortenberry. The Club for Growth endorsed Fortenberry, and ran television advertisements attacking Bromm for supporting tax increases. Bromm ultimately lost the primary to Fortenberry by a narrow margin, receiving 26 percent of the vote to Fortenberry's 31 percent and Ruehle's 16 percent.
