= Harold Stryker =

American politician (1915–2005)

Member of the Nebraska Legislature
- In office January 1, 1957 – January 6, 1969
- Preceded by: Owen Person
- Succeeded by: Loran Schmit
- Constituency: 17th district (1957–1965); 23rd district (1965–1969)

Personal details
- Born: December 28, 1915 Rising City, Nebraska
- Died: October 14, 2005 (aged 89) David City, Nebraska
- Party: Democratic
- Education: Midland College; Nebraska College of Agriculture
- Occupation: Instructor, heavy machine operator

Harold B. Stryker (December 28, 1915 – October 14, 2005) was an American politician from Nebraska who served as a Democratic member of the Nebraska Legislature from 1957 to 1969.

== Early life ==
Stryker was born in Rising City, Nebraska, in 1915. He graduated from Rising City High School and attended Midland College and the Nebraska College of Agriculture. Stryker was a farmer, heavy machine operator, and a vocational agriculture instructor, and served as chairman of the Butler County Democratic Party.

== Nebraska Legislature ==
In 1956, Stryker ran for the Nebraska Legislature from the 17th district, challenging incumbent State Senator Owen Person for re-election. In the primary election, Person placed first, receiving 47 percent of the vote to Stryker's 36 percent. In the general election, Stryker defeated Person by a narrow margin, winning 52 percent of the vote to Person's 48 percent. Stryker was re-elected unopposed in 1958.

Stryker ran for re-election in 1960. He was challenged by former State Senator William J. Williams and Lester Jensen in the primary. Stryker placed first, receiving 68 percent of the vote, and advanced to the general election with Williams, who received 25 percent. In the general election, Stryker defeated Williams with 58 percent of the vote. He was re-elected unopposed in 1962.

Following redistricting, Stryker ran for re-election in the 23rd district. He was challenged by attorney Harry Washburn and Clyde Worrall. In the primary, Stryker placed first, receiving 48 percent of the vote to Worrall's 33 percent and Washburn's 19 percent. He and Worrall faced off in the general election, which Stryker won with 55 percent of the vote.

== Death ==
Stryker died on October 14, 2005.
