= Senator Person =

Senator Person may refer to:

- Curtis S. Person Jr. (1934–2020), Tennessee State Senate
- Owen Person (1888–1976), Nebraska State Senate
- Seymour H. Person (1879–1957), Michigan State Senate

== See also ==
- Senator Persons (disambiguation)
