= Wausa, Nebraska =

- Village
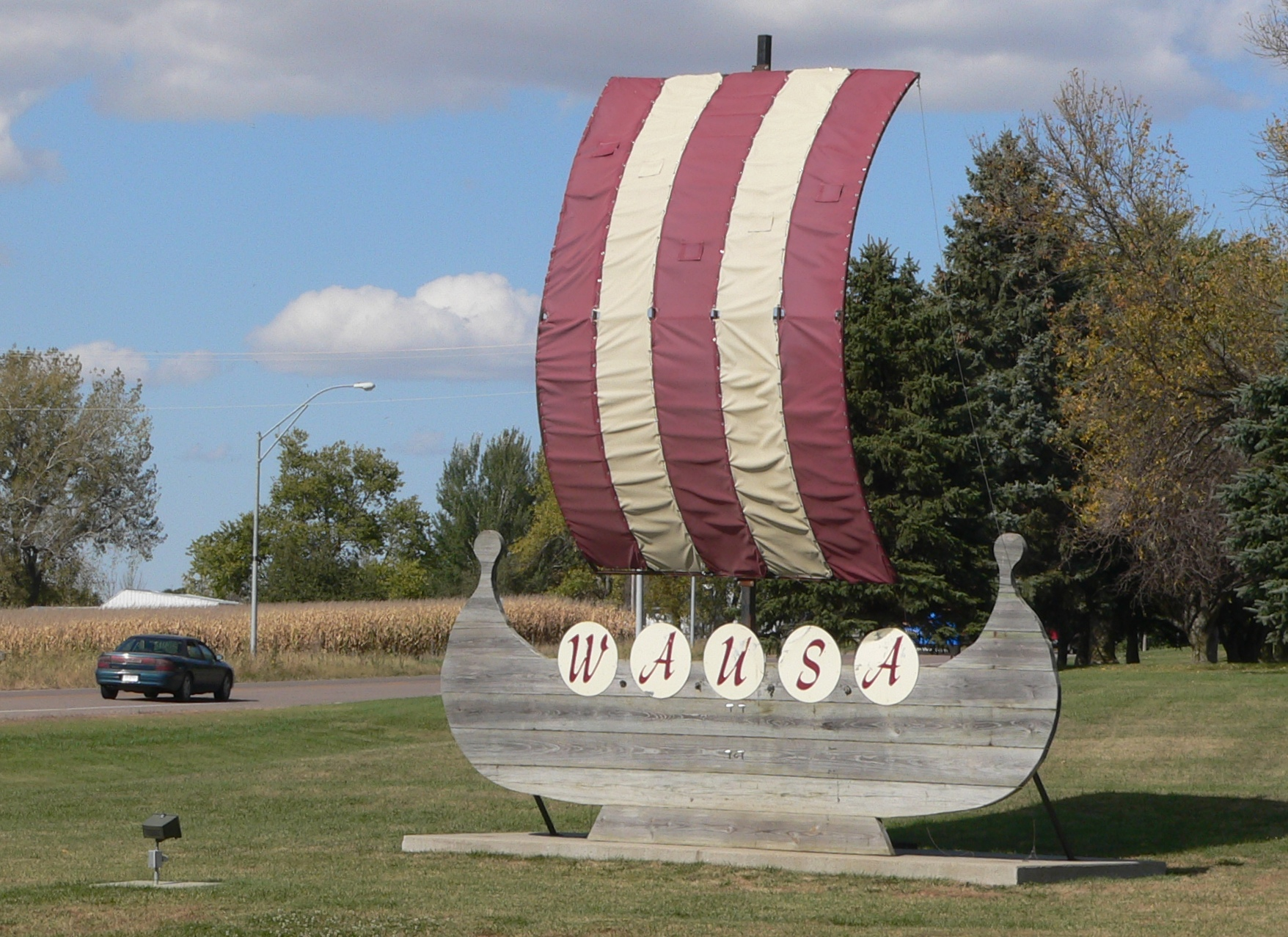
- Welcome sign at the southern edge of Wausa, in the form of a Viking longship.

- Location of Wausa, Nebraska
- Coordinates: 42°29′52″N 97°32′22″W
- Country: United States
- State: Nebraska
- County: Knox

Area
  - Total: 0.53 sq mi (1.36 km^{2})
  - Land: 0.53 sq mi (1.36 km^{2})
  - Water: 0 sq mi (0.00 km^{2})
- Elevation: 1,778 ft (542 m)

Population (2020)
  - Total: 592
  - Density: 1,128.8/sq mi (435.85/km^{2})
- Time zone: UTC-6 (Central (CST))
  - Summer (DST): UTC-5 (CDT)
- ZIP code: 68786
- Area code: 402
- FIPS code: 31-51735
- GNIS feature ID: 2400110

Wausa is a village in Knox County, Nebraska, United States. As of the 2020 census, Wausa had a population of 592.

== Geography ==
According to the United States Census Bureau, the village has a total area of 0.53 square miles (1.37 km^{2}), all land.

== Demographics ==
Historical population
Census	Pop.	Note	%±
1900	441		—
1910	604		37.0%
1920	688		13.9%
1930	754		9.6%
1940	732		−2.9%
1950	708		−3.3%
1960	724		2.3%
1970	720		−0.6%
1980	647		−10.1%
1990	598		−7.6%
2000	636		6.4%
2010	634		−0.3%
2020	592		−6.6%
U.S. Decennial Census

=== 2010 census ===
As of the census of 2010, there were 634 people, 257 households, and 172 families residing in the village. The population density was 1,196.2 inhabitants per square mile (461.9/km^{2}). There were 290 housing units at an average density of 547.2 per square mile (211.3/km^{2}). The racial makeup of the village was 97.6% White, 0.2% Native American, 0.5% Asian, 0.6% from other races, and 1.1% from two or more races. Hispanic or Latino of any race were 2.5% of the population.

There were 257 households, of which 27.6% had children under the age of 18 living with them, 57.6% were married couples living together, 8.2% had a female householder with no husband present, 1.2% had a male householder with no wife present, and 33.1% were non-families. 31.5% of all households were made up of individuals, and 14.8% had someone living alone who was 65 years of age or older. The average household size was 2.29 and the average family size was 2.86.

The median age in the village was 48.3 years. 23.8% of residents were under the age of 18; 4.3% were between the ages of 18 and 24; 17.6% were from 25 to 44; 23.8% were from 45 to 64; and 30.4% were 65 years of age or older. The gender makeup of the village was 47.6% male and 52.4% female.

=== 2000 census ===
As of the census of 2000, there were 636 people, 276 households, and 171 families residing in the village. The population density was 1,209.4 inhabitants per square mile (467.0/km^{2}). There were 301 housing units at an average density of 572.4 per square mile (221.0/km^{2}). The racial makeup of the village was 98.90% White, 0.47% African American, 0.16% Native American, 0.16% Asian, and 0.31% from two or more races. Hispanic or Latino of any race were 0.63% of the population.

There were 276 households, out of which 24.6% had children under the age of 18 living with them, 57.6% were married couples living together, 4.0% had a female householder with no husband present, and 38.0% were non-families. 37.0% of all households were made up of individuals, and 26.1% had someone living alone who was 65 years of age or older. The average household size was 2.15 and the average family size was 2.82.

In the village, the population was spread out, with 21.7% under the age of 18, 4.4% from 18 to 24, 19.2% from 25 to 44, 20.4% from 45 to 64, and 34.3% who were 65 years of age or older. The median age was 48 years. For every 100 females, there were 90.4 males. For every 100 females age 18 and over, there were 83.8 males.

As of 2000 the median income for a household in the village was $28,929, and the median income for a family was $36,477. Males had a median income of $27,000 versus $15,313 for females. The per capita income for the village was $15,487. About 4.8% of families and 8.1% of the population were below the poverty line, including 13.7% of those under age 18 and 7.6% of those age 65 or over.

== History ==
In 1882 Theodore T. Thorson was the first resident. He named the town Thorson, Nebraska. He also became its first postmaster, and resided in the town's post office. He was returning from a five-month journey over the West Coast, Montana and Wyoming, in search of a good location for stock raising.

Mr. Thorson returned to Minnesota and in the following spring married and returned to Nebraska with his bride. He leased 200 acres (0.81 km^{2}) of land, built a sod house, and started a sheep ranch consisting of 115 sheep. Families immigrating from Sweden began to arrive and Thorson was appointed land agent. At this time, Creighton, Nebraska had the nearest railroad station. A pony express was started by a man with the name Campbell. He made three trips a week from their town to Creighton.

By 1885, 12 new families had moved to the settlement and it was decided that they would change the name to "Vasa" in honor of the Swedish king Gustav Vasa. The railroad came through Vasa on November 27, 1890. At this time, the name was changed to Wausa, a combination of the name of the dynasty Vasa founded and the letters USA. In the fall of 1891, a community water well was created. It was 33 ft (10 m) deep and cost $40. The first water system was installed in 1903, and a complete sewer system was constructed in 1916. The Waste Water Treatment Facility was built in 1985.

== Notable people ==
- Doug Cunningham, Nebraska state senator
- George E. Danielson, U.S. representative from California
- Norbert Tiemann, governor of Nebraska and mayor of Wausa

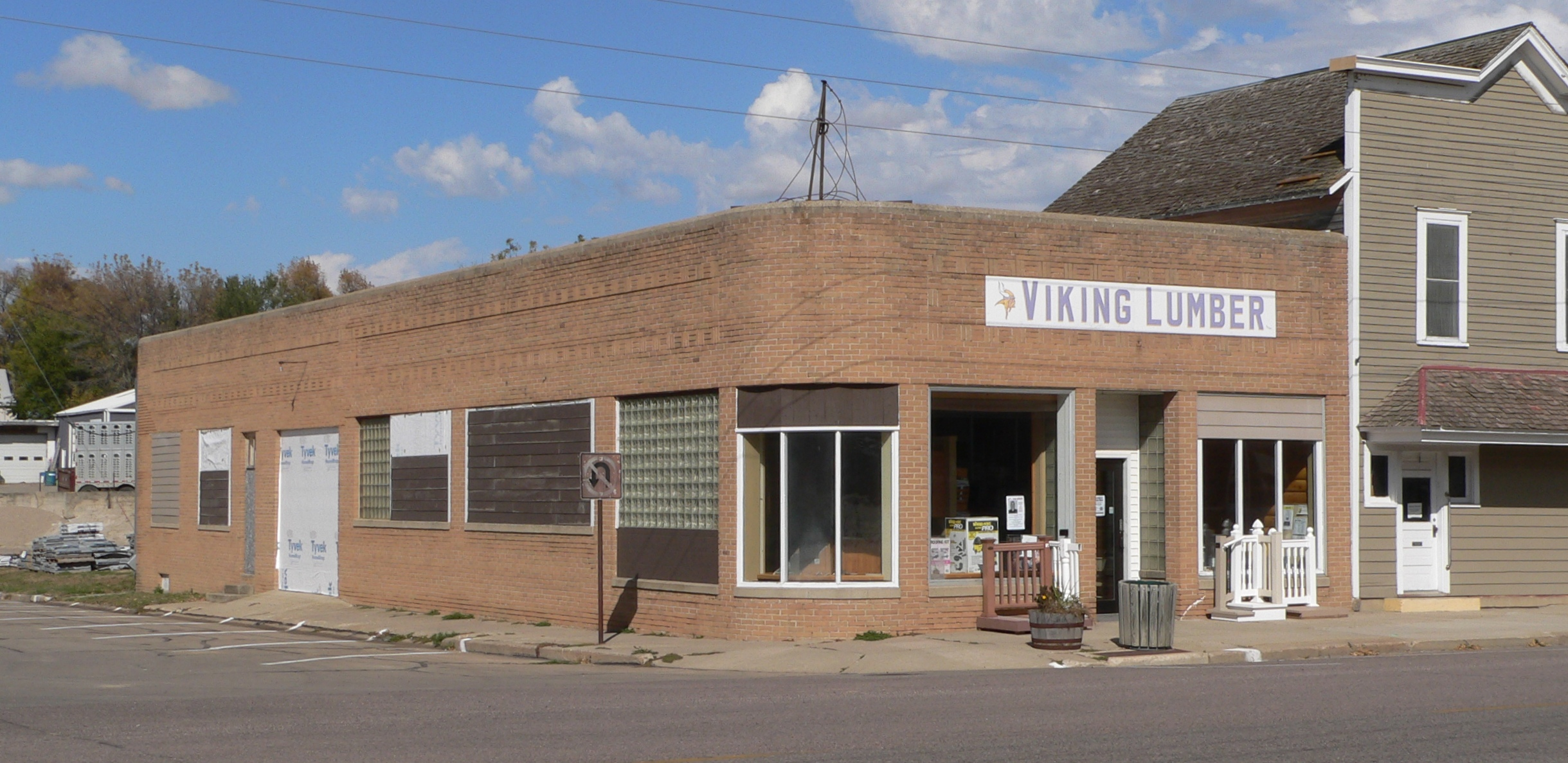
Viking Lumber in downtown Wausa

Dorene Sherman, Deputy of Protocol for USAF at Offutt AFB

== Community culture ==
=== Annual events ===
==== Pork Chop Barbecue ====
The annual Pork Chop Barbecue, a fundraising event for the Wausa Community Club, is held on a Saturday night in late July or early August. Weather permitting, this event is usually held in the spacious Gladstone Park. Originally started in 1984 as a fundraiser for the town's 1990 Centennial, it is now used to raise funds for worthwhile projects within the community. The "all you can eat" menu for the evening consists of grilled pork chops, baked potatoes, coleslaw, lemonade, pop, coffee and beer. A band plays for your listening and dancing enjoyment with intermissions filled with the auctioning of donated items. Auction items often include hand-crafted items, Husker football tickets, guided tours on Lewis and Clark Lake, labor and agricultural products, to name a few

==== Labor Day Weekend Celebration ====
A tradition at Wausa has been a Labor Day Weekend Celebration. The activities and duration of the celebration (1–3 days) vary each year. In recent years the celebration has been a one-day (Sunday) affair packed with events for all ages. Activities include a beef barbecue, car show, community worship service, kiddie carnival, food court, ice cream social, petting zoo, model airplane show, skydiving exhibition, horseshoe pitching contest, sand volleyball tournament and a 3-on-3 basketball tournament. The evening finale typically is a local talent contest, a play production, a magic show or a musical performance.

==== Swedish Smorgasbord ====
The Wausa Community Swedish Smörgåsbord is held the fourth Saturday of each October. For over 50 years the annual event has been a community project complete with colorful Swedish costumes and decorations. The Smörgåsbord serves a variety of foods including potato sausage, meatballs, ham, herring, cold meats, salads, rye bread, sweet breads, brown beans, deviled eggs, fruit soup, ostkaka, rice pudding and lingonberries. Several recipes used have been passed down from generation to generation.

=== Churches ===
==== Evangelical Covenant Church ====
The first pastor of Evangelical Covenant Church was Rev. C. F. Larson. The founder of this church was The Swedish Christian congregation of Wausa. This church was rebuilt and started in 1893. The Swedish language was used in Sunday school until 1918 and then dropped. The Young People's Society was started in the early 1900s and now they are now called High League. The first church choir was started in the early 1900s.

==== Golgotha Lutheran Church ====
Golgotha Lutheran Church (LCMS) was started in 1896. The founder of Golgotha was Theodore Moellering. The first pastor got ill, so he was there for only a few months. Church services were spoken in German until 1941. The first church services were held in country schools near the present site of the church. In the year of 1898, the church bought 5 acres (20,000 m^{2}) of land. In 1914, the first church was struck by lightning and burned to the ground.

==== Thabor Lutheran Church ====
The first pastor of Thabor Lutheran Church was Rev. C. G. Olson. The founder of Thabor was Pastor S. Thorell. This church was started in 1892 and was rebuilt with a bell that was the only one in town. The Sunday school was built in 1950 with the Luther League installed right after. They had the Swedish language in the church until 1934, when it was dropped in favor of the English language. The Moller Pipe Organ was installed in 1952 and still played every Sunday. The first worship service was held in 1904 in the new church. In 1962 a Swedish tradition was added called "Santa Lucia".

==== United Methodist Church ====
The first Methodist pastor was Rev. Gearhart. The founder was Rev. Carter. This church was started in 1892. The preacher was paid with butter, eggs, pork, and grain. The United Methodist Women's group started the Smorgasbord in 1948. Osmond and Magnet were in charge of the Methodist Church. The bell was removed in 1986.

== Education ==
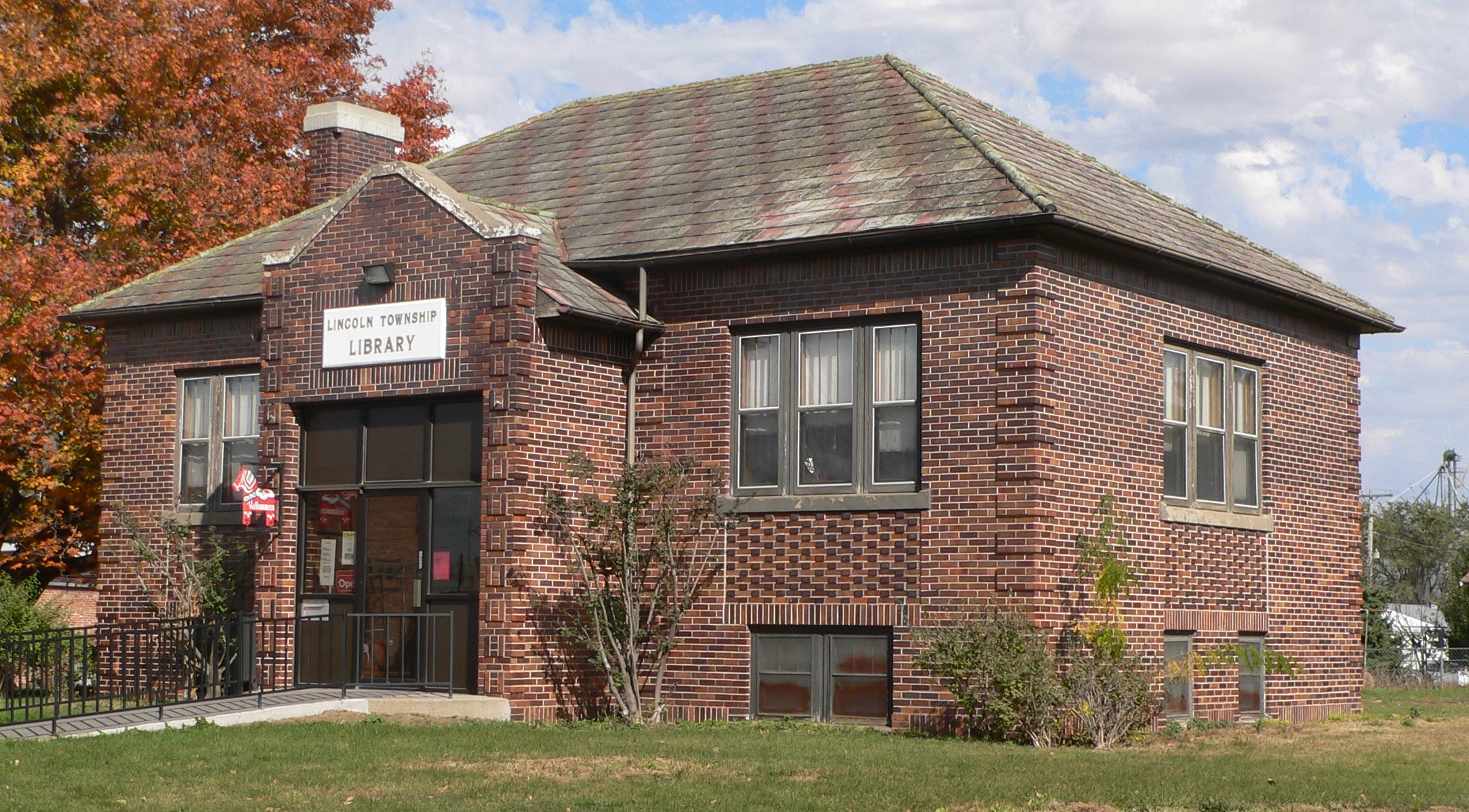
Lincoln Township library in Wausa. Note the Dala horse hanging beside the door.

The first school house in the school district of Wausa was built in 1887 along Highway 121, north of town. The second school house was built in 1890 and was moved three times while functioning as the main school building. The current brick structure school house was built in 1913, and still houses the art room, lockers, Math, English, Spanish, and Social Studies classrooms. They added onto the south of the building in 1960. This section is the current elementary and multipurpose room. It also houses the elementary computer lab, as well as the distance learning facility. The district added onto the high school, building a north wing in 1964. The football field was added across the street in 1970. The gym, stage, and locker rooms were added on in 1975. The new press box and scoreboard were added to the field in 2005.

Boys' basketball started in 1913. Girls' basketball began in 1914 but was dropped sometime after 1932, returning in 1975. An orchestra was begun in 1918 and ended in 1930. Football started in 1923. Track started in 1927. Volleyball began in 1968. Golf ran from 1977 to 1983. The speech team won state championships in 2014, 2015, and 2016. Wausa won state play-production championships in 2006, 2007, 2008, 2009, 2010, 2012, 2013, 2014, and 2015.

In 1975, they had seven school bus routes. Now there are two bus routes. In the 1970s the average class size was fifty students. Today Wausa High School is home to 54 students in grades 9–12. Wausa's mascot is the Vikings and Lady Vikings and their colors are Purple and Gold.
