= Tyson Larson =

American politician

Member of the Nebraska Legislature from the 40th district
- In office 2011–2019
- Preceded by: Cap Dierks
- Succeeded by: Tim Gragert

Personal details
- Born: April 16, 1986 (age 40) Fort Carson, Colorado, U.S.
- Party: Republican
- Education: Georgetown University (BA)

Tyson Larson (born April 16, 1986) is an American politician who served as a member of the Nebraska Legislature for the 40th district from 2011 to 2019.

== Early life and education ==
Larson was born in Fort Carson, Colorado. He graduated from Weeping Water High School in Weeping Water, Nebraska, in 2004. He earned a Bachelor of Arts degree in government and theology from Georgetown University in 2008.

== Career ==
In 2010 Larson defeated 20-year incumbent Senator Cap Dierks and was elected to represent the 40th Nebraska legislative district.

During his first two years in the Legislature, Larson sat on the Agriculture, Enrollment and Review (Chairman), General Affairs, Judiciary, and State-Tribal Relations committees. During his third and fourth years in the Legislature, he helped to develop and coordinate the state's $8.5 billion budget on the Appropriations committee.

In 2014, Larson ran for re-election, defeating challenger Keith Kube with over 67% of the vote. Upon returning to the Legislature, Larson was elected to be Chairman of the General Affairs committee and served on the Agriculture and Government committees. Larson was also selected by his colleagues to serve on the Legislature's Executive Board.
