= Loran Schmit =

American politician (1929–2025)

Loran C. Schmit

Member of the Nebraska Legislature from the 23rd district
- In office January 6, 1969 – January 6, 1993
- Preceded by: Harold Stryker
- Succeeded by: Curt Bromm

Personal details
- Born: August 14, 1929 Butler County, Nebraska, U.S.
- Died: September 17, 2025 (aged 96) Bellwood, Nebraska, U.S.
- Party: Republican
- Spouse: Irene Schmit
- Children: 10
- Education: University of Nebraska (BS)

Loran C. Schmit (August 14, 1929 – September 17, 2025) was an American politician in the state of Nebraska. He served as a state senator from Bellwood, Nebraska, in the Nebraska Legislature, from 1969 to 1993.

== Background ==
Schmit was born on August 14, 1929, on a farm in Butler County, Nebraska, seven miles east of Bellwood, Nebraska, to Nick and Loretta Schmit. He attended Columbus High School in Columbus, Nebraska, and then went on to attend the University of Nebraska, graduating with a Bachelor of Science degree in agriculture in 1950. Schmit then married Irene Squire in 1950, and they had ten children. At various times in his life, he worked as both an agriculture teacher and a commercial helicopter pilot who would dynamite ice jams on the Platte River, but his primary occupation was as a farmer.

== State legislature ==
Schmit was elected to the legislature in 1968 to represent the 23rd Nebraska legislative district. He was consistently reelected until he was defeated for reelection in November 1992. In 1971, he was elected chairman of the Agriculture Committee, at a time when Nebraska established the state natural resource districts (NRDs). During his 24 years of service in the Nebraska Legislature, Schmit supported legislation that helped build the ethanol industry, created the state's expressway system, allowed physician assistants to practice in Nebraska, and created the Nebraska Ombudsman's Office and the Department of Environmental Control. He also pushed back on supermarkets such as Safeway which he claimed were fixing prices on meat, to the detriment of Nebraska's cattle industry, and he also supported local slot-machine gambling as a means of reducing property taxes.

For his work on ethanol, Schmit was recognized by Nebraska Governor Charles Thone as "almost singlehandedly forcing a seemingly reluctant nation to examine the use of grain alcohol as a nonpolluting renewable source of energy." Nebraska state labor commissioner and son-in-law of Schmit John Albin said, "I don’t think there would be an ethanol industry in this nation without him. He would just not give up."

In 1988, Schmit chaired a committee that led an investigation into the collapse of the Franklin Community Federal Credit Union in Omaha, Nebraska, during the Franklin child prostitution ring allegations, which included allegations of embezzlement and child prostitution which were explored by the committee.

== Congressional campaign ==
In 1978, after almost ten years in the Nebraska Legislature, Schmit ran for an open seat in the United States House of Representatives in Nebraska's 1st congressional district to replace Charles Thone, who was running for Governor of Nebraska. He faced fellow state senator Doug Bereuter in the primary and was thought by some to be the frontrunner, but he was ultimately defeated by Bereuter by 3,200 votes.

== Later life and death ==
After leaving the Nebraska Legislature, Schmit became a lobbyist for the ethanol industry in Nebraska and served in other various capacities with the state's natural resource districts.

Schmit died at his home in Bellwood, Nebraska, on September 17, 2025, at the age of 96.

== See also ==
- Nebraska Legislature
- List of Nebraska state senators
