= Franklin child prostitution ring allegations =

1988 investigation in Nebraska

Beginning in June 1988, several prominent political and business figures in Omaha, Nebraska were accused of involvement in a child sex trafficking ring. The allegations attracted significant public and political interest until late 1990, when separate state and federal grand juries concluded that the allegations were unfounded and the ring was "a carefully crafted hoax, scripted by a person or people with considerable knowledge of the people and institutions of Omaha".

== History ==
In 1987, the Nebraska Foster Care Review Board received allegations of an organized ring of child abuse. Following a perceived lack of action from law enforcement, the Board passed these allegations to the Nebraska Legislature.

In November 1988, federal authorities investigating the embezzlement of over $38 million raided the Franklin Community Credit Union in Omaha, Nebraska. Shortly thereafter, Nebraska state senator Ernie Chambers remarked to the executive board of the State Legislature that he had received numerous reports of child sexual abuse linked to the scandal.

The accusations primarily centered on Lawrence E. King Jr., who ran the credit union, and alleged that he hosted "lavish parties at which minors were sexually abused". King was a rising figure, donor, and powerbroker in the Republican Party before the investigation, singing the national anthem at the 1984 Republican National Convention and spending $100,000 on parties for the 1988 convention. King had a luxurious lifestyle, chartering private jets and limousines and wearing expensive clothes and jewellery, including a $69,000 watch seized after he went into court-ordered receivership. He also owned multiple houses and businesses in Nebraska, as well as a house near Embassy Row, Washington, D.C., which he rented.

=== Investigations ===
The Nebraska Legislature organized a state committee in December 1988 to look into both the credit union embezzlement and the child prostitution allegations named the Franklin Committee, led by state senator Loran Schmit with Ernie Chambers acting as vice chair. Numerous conspiracy theories spread after the committee was announced, claiming that the alleged abuse was part of a widespread series of crimes including devil worship, cannibalism, drug trafficking, and CIA arms dealing.

State and federal law enforcement investigated allegations that prominent citizens of Nebraska, as well as high-level U.S. politicians, were involved in a child prostitution ring. Alleged abuse victims were interviewed, who claimed that children in foster care were flown to the East Coast of the United States to be sexually abused.

In July 1990, private investigator Gary Caradori, hired by the Franklin Committee to investigate the allegations, died along with his 8-year-old son when his plane disintegrated in mid-air near Chicago. Foul play was suspected by Caradori's brother and state senator Loran Schmit, but was not proven by investigators. No definitive cause for the crash has been established.

In July 1990, a separate county investigation by a grand jury in Douglas County, where Omaha, Nebraska, is situated, determined the abuse allegations were baseless, describing them as a "carefully crafted hoax" and indicting two of the original accusers on perjury charges. The grand jury suspected that the false stories originated from a fired employee of Boys Town, who might have "fueled the fire of rumor and innuendo" because of personal grudges, but refused to name someone as the source of the stories. State senator and Franklin Committee head Schmit called the grand jury report "a strange document", adding "that is the kindest thing I can say about it."

In September 1990, a federal grand jury also concluded that the abuse allegations were unfounded and indicted 21-year-old Alisha Owen, an alleged victim, on eight counts of perjury. Owen served two years in solitary confinement and an additional 4 1/2 years in prison. The same federal grand jury later indicted King and multiple officers of the credit union with embezzlement of funds. In 1991, King pleaded guilty to assisting in embezzling $39 million and was sentenced to 15 years in prison. In spite of the findings of the grand jury, Paul Bonacci, a witness who was also charged by the grand jury but ultimately not convicted, filed a civil suit against King the same year, accusing him of sexual abuse. Bonacci won the case after King failed to defend himself, leading the judge to award a default judgement.

== Legacy ==
The LaRouche movement heavily exploited the Franklin allegations. In October 1990, the Schiller Institute sent a 10-person delegation to investigate the Franklin case, headed by the reverend James Bevel (himself later convicted of child sexual abuse). The group later published a statement contradicting the findings of two grand juries in the case. Publications from LaRouche's magazine the Executive Intelligence Review built upon the allegations over the following decade, linking them to the "Project Monarch" conspiracy theory. The LaRouche organization's tactics around the case have been cited as exemplifying how neo-fascist groups recruit progressives.

In 1992, former Nebraskan state senator John DeCamp released a book titled The Franklin Cover-up, alleging that the conspiracy theories about a sex trafficking ring were true, and that the investigations into the credit union had covered up the abuse. During the initial investigation in 1989, DeCamp had sent a memo to journalists containing five names of those he alleged were involved in the ring. DeCamp was admonished by lawmakers for releasing the memo, with a grand jury concluding that DeCamp had made the allegations for "personal political gain and possible revenge for past actions alleged against [DeCamp]". Following the book's release, DeCamp filed a lawsuit against the grand jury over its final report and conclusions. Editors of the Executive Intelligence Review wrote favorably of the book.

In 1993, a Yorkshire TV film crew traveled to North America to create a documentary about the allegations titled Conspiracy of Silence, interviewing DeCamp, Bonacci, and others involved in the scandal. The film was pulled from the network's release schedule before it could be aired, with an unfinished cut later surfacing online.

== In media ==
The Franklin allegations are mentioned in season three of the TV show True Detective.

== See also ==
- Satanic panic
- Lyndon LaRouche
- Pizzagate conspiracy theory
- QAnon
- Jeffrey Epstein
