= Owen Person =

American politician (1888–1976)

Member of the Nebraska Legislature from the 17th district
- In office January 7, 1947 – January 1, 1957
- Preceded by: Alfred Brodahl
- Succeeded by: Harold Stryker

Personal details
- Born: November 28, 1888 West Point, Nebraska
- Died: August 22, 1976 (aged 87) Wahoo, Nebraska
- Party: Republican
- Spouse: Ruth Williams (m. 1918)
- Education: Kansas City Veterinary College (D.V.M.)
- Occupation: Veterinarian

Owen H. Person (November 28, 1888 – August 22, 1976) was a Republican politician from Nebraska who served as a member of the Nebraska Legislature from the 17th district from 1947 to 1957.

== Early life ==
Person was born in West Point, Nebraska, in 1888. He attended graduate school in West Point and graduated from the Kansas City Veterinary College in 1913. Person settled in Wahoo, where he was elected mayor in 1928, serving until he ran for the legislature in 1946.

== Nebraska Legislature ==
In 1946, when State Senator Alfred Brodahl declined to seek re-election, Person ran to succeed him in the 17th district, which included Butler and Saunders counties. In the nonpartisan primary, Person placed first, winning 29 percent of hte vote, and he advanced to the general election with Frank Vlasak, who placed second with 21 percent. In the general election, Person defeated Vlasak with 66 percent of the vote.

Person ran for re-election in 1948, and was challenged by attorney Venn V. Virgl. In the primary, Person received 73 percent of the vote to Virgl's 27 percent of the vote. He defeated Virgl in the general election with 62 percent of the vote.

In 1950, Person was challenged by Harry Decker, an Ashland businessman, and George Behne, a farmer. In the primary, Person received 52 percent of the vote, and advanced to the general election with Behne, who placed second with 27 percent. In the general election, Person defeated Behne with 58 percent of the vote.

Person was re-elected unopposed in 1952. He ran for re-election in 1954, and was challenged by Behne, former Ashland Mayor O. J. Lohr, and attorney Claude Lutton. Person received 41 percent of the vote in the primary, and proceeded to the general election with Behne, who received 32 percent. Person defeated Behne in the general election with 54 percent of the vote.

In 1956, Person ran for a sixth term. He was opposed by farmer Harold Stryker and Lutton. Person placed first in the primary, receiving 47 percent of the vote to Stryker's 36 percent. They faced off in the general election, and Stryker narrowly defeated Person, receiving 52 percent of the vote to Person's 48 percent.

== Death ==
Person died on August 22, 1976.
