= Painted Black (book) =

1990 book by Carl Raschke

- Cover of the first edition
- Author: Carl Raschke
- Language: English
- Subject: Satanism
- Publisher: Harper & Row
- Publication date: 1990
- Publication place: United States
- Media type: Print
- Pages: 276
- ISBN: 0-06-250704-4
- OCLC: 20799616
- Dewey Decimal: 133.4220973
- LC Class: BF1548 .R37 1990

Painted Black: From Drug Killings to Heavy Metal — The Alarming True Story of How Satanism Is Terrorizing Our Communities is a book about Satanism by American academic Carl Raschke, then a religious studies professor at the University of Denver. It was published in 1990 by Harper & Row. The book attempts to link Satanism to the drug trade, several murders, heavy metal music, neo-Nazism and Dungeons & Dragons. He describes most other researchers of Satanism, including the FBI, scholars, and police, as "cult apologists".

The reception to the book from scholars and the media was highly critical. Specific criticism was given over the book's factual accuracy, hysterical nature, sourcing, and for contributing to the Satanic panic. Scholar Arthur Versluis wrote of Painted Black that "it is scarcely possible to exaggerate the hysterical nature of this book, nor the number of errors in it". Shawn Carlson called the book a "firm clout on the jaw of reason", and "the Exxon Valdez of rational journalism".

== Background and publication history ==
Carl Raschke is an American scholar of religion and was at the time of the book's publication a religious studies professor at the University of Denver. Raschke was the director of the Institute for the Humanities at the college. He was a self described expert on the Satanic, and had previously been an expert witness in court on two trials that involved Satanism.

The book came at a time where several high-profile crimes had been linked or blamed on Satanism and the occult. In writing the book, Raschke drew much of his material from the work of Dale Griffis, a scholar whose work is not accepted by most other scholars and whose diploma was received from a diploma mill. The book was published in 1990 by Harper & Row. Its first edition was 276 pages long.

The Satanist Michael A. Aquino, covered in the book, sued as a result of its publication, alongside another book that mentioned him, The New Satanists by Linda Blood. Both Raschke and Blood implied that Aquino was guilty of a past accusation of child molestation. The case was settled out of court.

== Contents ==
The book traces the historical roots and genealogy of Satanism, which Raschke says has its origins in the occultism of the Knights Templar. He traces the advancement of Satanism to Aleister Crowley.

He argues that Satanism's appeal to the American youth is brought on by a "culture of despair", and contributed to by the drug culture. Drug abuse, teen suicide, and instances of child abuse are all blamed on Satanism. Raschke attempts to link Satanism to many crimes and other activities, including the drug trade, several murders, heavy metal and rock music. He also connects Satanism to neo-Nazism and Dungeons & Dragons. He describes Satanism as an "ideological conspiracy to overthrow the world", that has practices that invoke animal and child abuse and murder. Raschke writes of Satanism that:

Satanism is a sophisticated and highly effective motivational system for the spread of violence and cultural terrorism all the while hiding behind the cloak of the First Amendment. It is an ideology has that found a strategic application in the criminal underworld, even it was not invented there.

Raschke says America is facing an epidemic of Satanic crime, which he says are ignored by the experts, FBI and media that paint instances like the murder of Mark Kilroy as "freak accidents". The Kilroy murder is focused on especially. He describes most other researchers of Satanism, including the FBI, scholars, police, and the National Child Safety Council, as "cult apologists", and that individuals such as an FBI special agent are friendly to the Satanic criminals.

== Reception ==
=== Contemporary reception ===
Upon release, the book was widely ridiculed by the press. A review from John G. Taylor of McClatchy described it as "launched with promise and scuttled by problems". Taylor said there was "little serious thought be found among the deluge of oftentimes meandering details about criminals". Similarly, a reviewer for The Charlotte Observer called the book conspiratorial and said that this "catalogue of crimes fails to convince us that these are anything more than isolated and unrelated incidents, as the FBI concludes". A review from the Houston Chronicle was more positive, though noted his conclusions were "not shared by every expert".

A review in the magazine The Humanist from Shawn Carlson called the book a "firm clout on the jaw of reason", "the Exxon Valdez of rational journalism" and "a masterpiece of the new 'satanic' McCarthyism". Carlson criticized the book for not putting any of the information in context, like not mentioning that "of the 100,000 murders committed in the United States over the last five years, fewer than 100 had occult or satanic overtones; moreover, most of these were committed by mentally disturbed adolescents". Reviewing Painted Black in 1991, scholar Jonathon S. Epstein wrote: "Painted Black adds additional fuel to the flames of hysteria surrounding satanism in America", that "what the book lacks is scholarship, it makes up for it in sweeping and unsupportable generalizations", and that "Painted Black cannot be taken seriously". Epstein singled out Raschke's history of Western Satanism and its origins as largely accurate and "excellent", but said that the rest of the book was very poor, especially the chapter on heavy metal music.

The book's factual accuracy was widely criticized. The Humanist said it got even extremely basic facts about many of the groups mentioned wrong, and that the book was "horribly researched and hysterically reasoned". Epstein noted that "in one instance Raschke discusses a record by the popular band Metallica that does not exist". Carlson also criticized its sourcing and usage of these sources, noting its reliance on Griffis and a memoir that was claimed to have been dictated by a ghost, instead of the wide array of more reputable research on Satanism. In 1995, scholar Wouter J. Hanegraaff wrote "Raschke's eagerness to include everything 'gnostic' into a 'genealogy of darkness' (Painted Black, 133) inspires sloppy historical scholarship. [...] With a similar lack of sensitivity for the power of words and definitions, Raschke routinely uses 'satanism' and 'occultism' as synonyms (for instance, Painted Black, 35-36). This careless attitude towards terminology leads to painfully inaccurate overviews".

=== Later reception ===
Scholar Arthur Versluis wrote of Painted Black that "it is scarcely possible to exaggerate the hysterical nature of this book, nor the number of errors in it (although some have tried at least to chronicle them)." He described it as an "effort to awaken an American inquisition" and refers to the book as "breathless sensationalism". Versluis cites Raschke's description of the roleplaying game Dungeons & Dragons as a means of initiation into "black magic" as an example. Analyzing Raschke's works on heavy metal, scholar Robert Walser (2013) says that "the terrorism of Raschke and similar critics depends upon two tactics: anecdote and insinuation. Raschke himself cites a group of sociologists of religion who determined that there was 'not a shred of evidence' that Satanism is a problem in America, directly contradicting the thesis of Rashke's book."

Writing in 1998, scholar Phillip Jenkins cites Painted Black next to Maury Terry's Ultimate Evil and Larry Kahaner's Cults That Kill along with an episode of Geraldo Rivera's talk show (Geraldo, "Devil Worship: Exposing Satan's Underground") as examples of major works that popularized the Satanic ritual abuse moral panic in the late 1980s and 1990s. Jenkins says "For several years, belief in the existence of satanic cults and ritual murder achieved wider credence in the United States than it had in any other society since that of sixteenth-century Europe", where the moral panic subsequently spread to areas of Europe, Australia, New Zealand, and South Africa. Referring to Painted Black, scholar Joshua Gunn (2005) writes that "Raschke's error-filled tome is frequently cited by seemingly secular academics who profess in a belief of Satanic ritual abuse".

Versluis called the book "dangerous stuff indeed... Fortunately, Raschke's book didn't have the kind of impact he so clearly wanted: to fully awaken the medieval Inquisitorial spirit. But... the 1980s and the 1990s 'Satanic panic' was bad enough." Comparing Raschke's Painted Black to Tipper Gore's 1987 book Raising PG Kids in an X-Rated Society in that Gore "invoked Satan as the seducer of youth", scholar Robert Latham (2007) refers to Carl Raschke as "a tabloid 'expert' on 'cults'". Latham is particularly critical of Raschke's claims that MTV "had put an entire generation of teens at risk of satanic contamination" and writes that "Raschke's indictment of the resultant 'Dionysian frenzy' [...] indiscriminately conflated acts of violence, sexual 'deviance', and supernaturalism in a millennial scenario of youth's spectacular degeneracy."

Scholars Asbjørn Dyrendal, James R. Lewis, and Jesper Aa. Petersen (2016) argue the book quotes "misleadingly and out of context" and said in it, Raschke had "forgotten all his academic training, and reverted, in a telling manner, to the folklore of evil".
