= Doug Cunningham (politician) =

American politician

Doug Cunningham (born October 13, 1954, in Osmond, Nebraska) is a politician from the U.S. state of Nebraska. He served in the Nebraska Legislature from 2001 to 2007.

Cunningham graduated from Wausa High School in 1972.

He was elected in 2000 to represent the 18th Nebraska Legislative District. In redistricting following the 2000 U.S. census, Wausa became part of the 40th District. Cunningham was elected to the 40th District seat in 2002.

In the legislature, he chaired the Business and Labor Committee, and sat on the Agriculture Committee and the Health and Human Services Committee.
