= Carl Raschke =

American philosopher (born 1944)

- Born: Carl Allen Raschke; 1944 (age 81–82)
- Known for: postmodern theology, popular religion, philosophy of religion, philosophy of culture, philosophy of technology, New Age, Satanism, the occult

Academic background
- Education: Pomona College, The Graduate Theological Union
- Alma mater: Harvard University
- Thesis: Moral action, God, and history in the thought of Immanuel Kant (1972)

Academic work
- Discipline: religious studies
- Sub-discipline: continental philosophy
- Language: English

Carl Allen Raschke (born 1944) is an American philosopher and theologian. Raschke is a Past Chair and Professor of Religious Studies Department at the University of Denver, specializing in continental philosophy, the philosophy of religion and the theory of religion. Raschke is known in part for his research in philosophy of religion, postmodern theology, popular religion, philosophy of culture and philosophy of technology. He received his B.A. from Pomona College, his M.A. from The Graduate Theological Union, and his Ph.D. from Harvard University. A major focus of Raschke's work has been postmodernism. In recent years he has written on the theory of religion and political theology.

During the late 1980s and 1990s, Raschke published works on (and made media appearances regarding) Satanism, the occult, heavy metal music, and subjects such as Dungeons & Dragons. In addition, Raschke was an expert witness on some cases involving Satanism, regularly made comments and appearances for the media on related topics, and advised the American Family Foundation; Raschke's comments and work during this period, particularly his 1990 book Painted Black, have been overwhelmingly condemned by scholars as inaccurate and repeatedly cited as having assisted in fueling the Satanic ritual abuse moral panic during the period, and Raschke's status as an "expert" on these topics has been criticized.

== Early life and education ==
Carl Allen Raschke was born in 1944. His father was Charles Raschke. He received his B.A. from Pomona College, his M.A. from The Graduate Theological Union, and his Ph.D. from Harvard University. He married in 1968.

== Career ==
Raschke is a Past Chair and Professor of Religious Studies Department at the University of Denver, specializing in continental philosophy, the philosophy of religion and the theory of religion. He was given the university lecturer award for 2020-2021. He is also listed with the affiliated faculty of the Global Center for Advanced Studies.

Raschke is senior editor for The Journal for Cultural and Religious Theory and senior consulting editor for The New Polis. He is a regular contributor to Political Theology Today.

=== Philosophy and theology ===
A central focus of Raschke’s work has been on postmodern religious thought and postmodernism. Raschke has been credited with being "one of the first to register the importance of Derrida's work for postmodern philosophies of religion ." In recent years he has written on the theory of religion and political theology. Alan J. Richard in The Palgrave Handbook of Radical Theology writes: "Carl Raschke, who might be credited for being the first to introduce deconstructive theory to the study of religion, is a unique theologian who has written on many topics, including economics, world religions, and higher education."

==== Early work ====
According to the 2003 The Encyclopedia of Postmodernism, his “work has sought to expose a conceptual tangle in modernity’s approach to language, religion, and the body." Raschke launched this project in the 1970s with the publication of an article in The Harvard Theological Review entitled “Meaning and Saying in Religion: Beyond Language Games,” in which he “argues that the failure of Anglo-American philosophy to adequately account for religious language reveals a deeper failure to account for the process of meaning-formation at the heart of language itself.” His first major book, The Alchemy of the Word: Language and the End of Theology (1979), which was republished in 2000 as The End of Theology, lays out this agenda in detail with reliance in particular on the philosophy of the later Martin Heidegger. Fire and Roses: Postmodernity and the Thought of the Body (1996) explores these interconnections by seeking to “reconcile erotic and tragic discourses through the thought of the Word made flesh.” An earlier work, entitled Theological Thinking: An In-Quiry (1988), investigates the interconnections between the languages of religion and science.

==== Turn of the millennium ====
After the turn of the millennium, Raschke turned his attention to the impact of postmodernism on Christian evangelical thought. His book, The Next Reformation: Why Evangelicals Must Embrace Postmodernity, explained how postmodern philosophy might transform present day evangelical theology, comparing it to Reformation thought, in particular Martin Luther’s key doctrines of sola fide (“by faith alone”) and sola Scriptura (“according to Scripture alone"). He writes in this book that “the postmodernist revolution in philosophy…has tendered an environment where the Christian gospel can at last be disentangled from the centuries-long gnarl of scientism, rationalism, secularism, humanism, and skepticism.” Reviewing the book, Brian C. Smith notes in Library Journal that Raschke challenges the conventional evangelical view of "postmodernism" and "exudes an embracing and accepting spirit toward it." A later book, entitled GloboChrist, published as part of a general series by Baker Academic Books, argued that the theory of the “rhizome,” first advanced by twentieth century French philosophers Gilles Deleuze and Felix Guattari, can be used to model the future of the Christian church in the new era of globalization. In an interview with the Evangelical Philosophical Society in 2009, Raschke explains he borrowed this term because “globalization is an ongoing, simultaneous transformation of nations, cultures, and religious outlooks and practices everywhere on the planet which they term ‘de-territorialization.’” Commenting on GloboChrist scholar Richard Haney criticizes the book for its "breezy terminology", but concludes the book "will challenge Christians to think missionally and philosophically at the same time." In his contribution among three authors to the volume Faith and Reason: Three Views, Raschke has argued that the gospel represented a departure from Greek and Enlightenment philosophies, and that faith and reason are "in tension" with each other. Finally, Raschke has sought to introduce the essential concepts of critical theory to an evangelical audience in his book Critical Theology: Introducing an Agenda for an Age of Global Crisis. Danish reviewer Michael Raubach writes: "Carl Raschke has spent his entire career at the intersection of theology, social theory, political philosophy, and the hurly-burly of practiced American religion, and in his 75th year he remains as provocative and insightful as ever. His recent primer, Critical Theology, is a welcome handbook for those with philosophical backgrounds seeking to ground their study of the Frankfurt school with something like Jürgen Moltmann’s liberation theology, or for those of a theological bent trying to grapple with the dense social critiques of a continental philosopher like Slavoj Žižek."

The Postmodern Reformation is a movement presently taking place throughout Western culture in which Christianity is experiencing a dramatic cultural shift away from institutionally centralized Christian practice closely related to primary Christendom values which have undergirded Roman Catholic, Orthodox, and Protestant culture since the 4th century. The movement parallels a number of other characteristic aspects of postmodernity including the adoption of primary extrainstitutional loyalties, a decentralized philosophy of cultural influence emphasizing authentic relationships, personal opportunity and responsibility for global and local contexts, and the localization of lifestyle. It also emphasizes a return to the values of 1st century Christian lifestyle using the tools of 21st century living.

Raschke has also written on the general theory of religion. His book,The Revolution in Religious Theory: Toward A Semiotics of the Event, lays out how postmodern philosophy has impacted and reshaped both classical and contemporary paradigms of how we understand what is meant by the “religious.” In an interview with David Hale, Raschke criticizes many scholars of religion, particularly in regard to "cults", for approaching their subject as a "pseudo-phenomenology" that "does not seek to probe, or dialectically reflect, beyond the bare given." In reviewing the book, McGill University scholar Nathan Strunk writes that Raschke criticizes the history of religious studies as colonializing with a tendency toward "Aryanization", and thus "readers should not be surprised if some areas they consider sacred are tread over lightly."

==== Political theology since 2015 ====
Since 2015 Raschke's work has focused mainly on political thought and political theology. His book Force of God: Political Theology and the Crisis of Liberal Democracy, leverages the philosophies of Michel Foucault and Friedrich Nietzsche to analyze from what he terms a “genealogical” standpoint the ongoing global economic crisis and the dysfunctions of democracy. In a review in the Journal of Religion Samuel Hayim Brody writes that "Force of God is ostensibly an entry in the genre of critical Schmittianism", but that "it also works on several other levels: as an extended exegesis and application of Nietzsche; as a survey of concepts of 'force' in modern Continental philosophy (as Kraft in Hegel and Schelling, as Gewalt in Schelling and Benjamin, as Macht in Nietzsche and force/pouvoir in his French interpreters); and as an argument for the continuing relevance of the Western philosophical canon to contemporary problems.". New Zealand scholar Michael Grimshaw writing in Syndicate, an online academic forum of major new books in a variety of fields, states that in Force of God "the crisis in liberal democracy is convincingly linked as yet another expression and result of Nietzsche’s death of god." He asks "if Force of God is a prophetical work in being the first political theology of the Trump interregnum; a political theology written before the rise of Trump but existing as both handbook to understanding the crisis in liberal democracy that led to Trump and a manifesto of how to undertake a political theology of resistance?"

His book Neoliberalism and Political Theology: From Kant to Identity Politics is a comprehensive analysis of the contemporary neoliberal world order and devotes specific attention to what political theorist Nancy Fraser terms "progressive neoliberalism." Raschke argues that neoliberalism, which is presided over by a new ruling class - the "knowledge class" - that has replaced the nineteenth century captains of industry, "is not so much an economic or a political formation as it is a value configuration against which much of the world is now in open revolt." What makes Raschke's argument unique, according to reviewer Michael Behrent, is the way he ties neoliberalism to progressive politics. According to Behrent, "Raschke shows how Fraser’s insights were prefigured by Foucault’s claim that liberalism originates in pastoral power—that is, a deterritorialized, shepherd-like authority legitimized by its concern for a flock’s well-being—and by Brown’s insight that the neoliberal idea of the free market is tied to a distorted sense of civic duty, which she dubs 'sacrificial citizenship.'". University of Bonn philosopher Kieryn Wurts observes that "Raschke’s work...is intended to hold up a mirror to us and to make clear through the genealogical method that we are the neoliberals. He does this through a sophisticated Marxist analysis of labor alienation, put rather simplistically, the educated classes if somewhat fatally failed to develop class consciousness."

Commenting on the 2020 George Floyd protests Raschke, drawing on Fraser and Louis Althusser, asserted that

In a word, “oppression” remains invisible because it is coded into the “common sense” of any social organization, while it is correspondingly legitimated and augmented by the communicative and educational apparatuses themselves that preserve a society’s unique “knowledge base.”

Raschke asserted that the New Left had unintentionally contributed to the rise of the Alt-right.

He has served as section editor for The Encyclopedia of Sciences and Religions.

== Satanic ritual abuse moral panic, modern popular culture and new religious movements ==
Raschke has written and commented on topics such as Satanism, Dungeons & Dragons, heavy metal music and certain new religious movements. His work in this area as well as his role in the development of the Satanic ritual abuse moral panic of the late 1980s and early 1990s, in particular the book Painted Black (1990), have been much criticized in academia.

Particularly during the late 1980s and 1990s, Raschke regularly commented to the media on matters involving Satanism and the occult, advised the American Family Foundation during the 1990s, and appeared as an expert witness during trials purportedly involving Satanism. Raschke has continued to accept media requests for comment on these topics, such as for an object purportedly involved in the murder of Jessica Ridgeway in 2012.

His book on the subject matter, Painted Black, was widely criticized by scholars. Scholar Arthur Versluis was highly critical of it, saying that "it is scarcely possible to exaggerate the hysterical nature of this book". Scholars Asbjørn Dyrendal, James R. Lewis, and Jesper Aa. Petersen (2016) characterized Raschke as an "until-then well-reputed academic" (referring to the publication of Painted Black). In an analysis of Raschke's role in adding fuel to the 1980s and early 1990s United States Satanic ritual abuse moral panic, scholar Eugene V. Gallagher (2004) notes that Raschke referred to critics of his works as "cult apologists" but says "the shrillness of Raschke's argument [...] ultimately fails to compensate for the paucity of evidence behind it". Versluis is critical of Raschke's role in the Satanic ritual abuse moral panic, noting the false imprisonments that the moral panic resulted in.

Scholar Robert Latham (2007) refers to Carl Raschke as "a tabloid 'expert' on 'cults'". Scholar Joseph P. Laycock is highly critical of statements that Raschke made in the 1980s and early 1990s regarding Satanism in popular culture, noting that Raschke "is one of the few academics who embraced the moral panic over Satanism and role-playing games in the 1980s". Analyzing Raschke's works on heavy metal, scholar Robert Walser (2013) says that "the terrorism of Raschke and similar critics depends upon two tactics: anecdote and insinuation. Raschke himself cites a group of sociologists of religion who determined that there was 'not a shred of evidence' that Satanism is a problem in America, directly contradicting the thesis of Rashke's book."

Raschke's comments regarding Heathenry have also been criticized. According to a 1998 interview with the SPLC, Raschke claimed that "a recent biological terrorism threat in New York City may have come from Asatrúers [sic]" (quote from SPLC 1998, reprinted in Gardell 2003). Citing this claim as an example of the reception of Heathenry in his overview, scholar Mattias Gardell (2003) says "I have found nothing to substantiate the alarmist allegations of Raschke".

In an article on Wicca and media for the Oxford Handbook of Religion and the News Media (2012), scholar Sarah M. Pike describes how a media report during the trial for the West Memphis Three "failed to consult experts on Wicca and Satanism" but rather referred to material by Raschke, who she describes as a "widely discredited 'Satanism expert'".

Raschke has written and commented in the media extensively on contemporary religion, especially regarding the New Age Movement. His most cited and often controversial book on this is The Interruption of Eternity (1980). Other writings of this kind include "The New Age: The Movement Toward Self-Discovery", "New Age Spirituality" and "New Age Economics".

== Bibliography ==
- Moral Action, God, and History in the Thought of Immanuel Kant. American Academy of Religion Dissertation Series 5. Missoula, MT: Scholars Press, 1975. ISBN 9780891300038.
- Religion and the Human Image. Editor and co-author with Mark C. Taylor and James Kirk. Englewood Cliffs, NJ: Prentice-Hall, 1976. ISBN 9780137734245.
- The Bursting of New Wineskins: Religion and Culture at the End of Affluence. Pittsburgh, PA: Pickwick Press, 1978. ISBN 9780915138340.
- The Alchemy of the Word: Language and the End of Theology. AAR Studies in Religion 20. Missoula, MT: Scholars Press, 1979. ISBN 9780891303190.
- The Interruption of Eternity: Modern Gnosticism and the Origins of the New Religious Consciousness. Chicago: Nelson-Hall, 1980. ISBN 9780882293745.
- Theological Thinking: An Inquiry. AAR Studies in Religion 53. Atlanta: Scholars Press, 1988. ISBN 9781555401870.
- Painted Black: From Drug Killings to Heavy Metal — The Alarming True Story of How Satanism Is Terrorizing Our Communities. San Francisco: Harper, 1990. ISBN 9780062507044. Paperback edition, Harper Collins, 1992. ISBN 9780061040801.
- Fire and Roses: Postmodernity and the Thought of the Body. Albany: State University of New York Press, 1995. ISBN 9780585062730.
- The Engendering God. Male and Female Faces of God. Co-authored with Susan D. Raschke. Louisville, KY: John Knox/Westminster, 1996. ISBN 9780664255022.
- The End of Theology. Denver CO: The Davies Group Publishers, 2000. ISBN 9781888570533. (Republication of The Alchemy of the Word with new introduction)
- The Digital Revolution and the Coming of the Postmodern University. London / New York: RoutledgeFalmer, 2002. ISBN 9780203451243.
- The Next Reformation: Why Evangelicals Must Embrace Postmodernity. Grand Rapids, MI: Baker Academic, 2004. ISBN 9780801027512.
- The Republic of Faith: The Search for Agreement Amid Diversity in American Religion. Religion in American Culture. Aurora, CO: Davies Group, 2005. ISBN 9781888570717.
- GloboChrist: The Great Commission Takes a Postmodern Turn. The Church and Postmodern Culture. Grand Rapids, MI: Baker Academic, 2008. ISBN 9780801032615.
- Postmodernism and the Revolution in Religious Theory: Toward a Semiotics of the Event. Studies in Religion and Culture. Charlottesville, VA: University of Virginia Press, 2012. ISBN 9780813933085.
- Force of God: Political Theology and the Crisis of Liberal Democracy. New York: Columbia University Press, 2015. ISBN 9780231539623.
- Critical Theology: Introducing an Agenda for an Age of Global Crisis. Downers Grove, IL: IVP Academic, 2016. ISBN 9780830851294.
- Postmodern Theology: A Biopic. Eugene, OR: Wipf and Stock, 2017. ISBN 1498203892.
- Neoliberalism and Political Theology: From Kant to Identity Politics. Edinburgh: Edinburgh University Press, 2019. ISBN 1474454550.
