= John DeCamp =

American politician (1941–2017)

Member of the Nebraska Legislature from the 40th district
- In office 1971–1987
- Preceded by: William M. Wylie
- Succeeded by: Cap Dierks

Personal details
- Born: John William DeCamp; July 6, 1941 Neligh, Nebraska, U.S.
- Died: July 27, 2017 (aged 76) Norfolk, Nebraska, U.S.
- Party: Republican; Libertarian
- Occupation: Attorney

Military service
- Allegiance: United States
- Branch/service: United States Army
- Years of service: 1965–1974
- Rank: Captain
- Unit: 67th Signal Battalion; 134th Infantry Regiment
- Battles/wars: Vietnam War
- Awards: National Defense Service Medal; Army Commendation Medal; Vietnam Service Medal; Republic of Vietnam Campaign Medal (1960); Republic of Vietnam Gallantry Cross with Palm

John William DeCamp (July 6, 1941 – July 27, 2017) was an American Republican politician and author who served in the Nebraska legislature from 1971 to 1987. He served as an infantry officer in the United States Army during the Vietnam War. In 1975 he was central to organizing Operation Babylift as a civilian, which evacuated 2,800 orphaned Vietnamese children. In 1992, DeCamp wrote a book titled The Franklin Cover-up: Child Abuse, Satanism, and Murder in Nebraska, in which he alleged the supposed existence of the Franklin child prostitution ring.

== Early life and legislative career ==
John DeCamp was born in Neligh, Nebraska, in 1941. He joined the United States Army during the Vietnam War, attained the rank of captain in the infantry, and was decorated for his service in Vietnam. In 1975 he initiated Operation Baby Lift, which evacuated 2,800 orphaned Vietnamese children, and was later assigned to serve as an aide to William Colby, then-Deputy Ambassador to Vietnam.

DeCamp began his election campaign for the Nebraska State Senate while still stationed in Vietnam. He was elected and served four terms as a Nebraska state senator from 1971 to 1987, during which he was described as "a strong advocate for veterans".

== After the legislature ==
In 1992, DeCamp wrote a book titled The Franklin Cover-up: Child Abuse, Satanism, and Murder in Nebraska, in which he alleged that the Franklin child prostitution ring allegations were not a hoax, as the grand juries tasked with investigating these allegations concluded, and alleged that the FBI and local Nebraska officials participated in a cover-up. DeCamp was featured in an unaired 1993 documentary titled "Conspiracy of Silence" produced by Yorkshire Television for the Discovery Channel. Producer Tim Tate said that the Discovery Channel withdrew their support for the film shortly before its broadcast date and it was never aired on television.

DeCamp served as a lawyer for the Militia of Montana, a militia-movement group, in the 1990s.

In 1996, DeCamp ran for the U.S. Senate as a Libertarian but lost to Republican Chuck Hagel.

In 2006, DeCamp attempted to return to the Nebraska legislature, running for a seat in the 30th District, which consisted of Gage County and southern Lancaster County. In the nonpartisan primary, he placed fourth of six candidates, with 12.3% of the vote; the top two vote-getters moved on to the general election, in which Norm Wallman was elected to the seat.

In Nebraska State Senator Ernie Chambers's 2008 satirical lawsuit against God, DeCamp acted as the attorney for God.

DeCamp died in Norfolk, Nebraska, on July 27, 2017. He had suffered from Parkinson's disease and Alzheimer's disease.

== Publications ==
- The Franklin Cover-up: Child Abuse, Satanism, and Murder in Nebraska. Lincoln, Neb.: AWT (1992) ISBN 978-0963215802. OCLC 25719868.
  - "Special 2004/2005 edition includes new author's note and developments since earlier editions." OCLC 173660810.
