= Stanisław Przybyszewski =

Polish novelist, dramatist and poet (1868-1927)

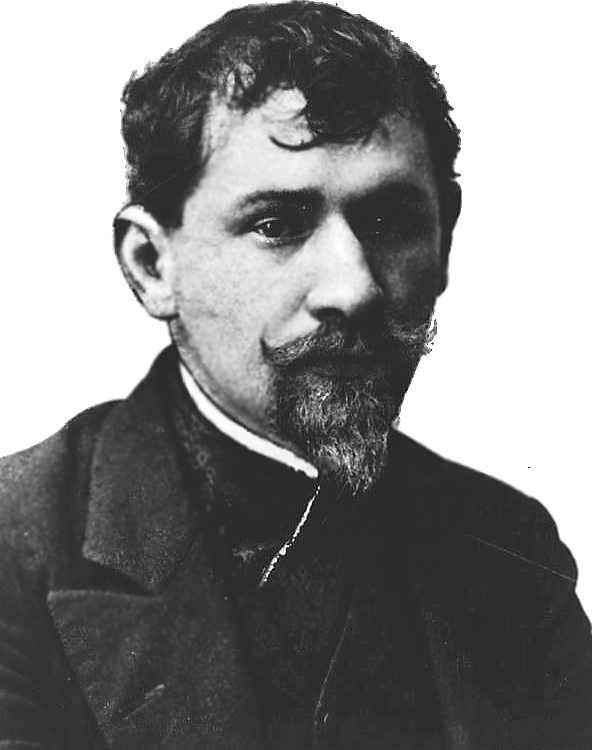
- Stanisław Przybyszewski
- Born: Stanisław Feliks Przybyszewski; 7 May 1868; Łojewo, Kuyavian-Pomeranian Voivodeship, Kingdom of Prussia, North German Confederation (now Poland)
- Died: 23 November 1927 (aged 59); Jaronty, Poland
- Resting place: Góra, Inowrocław County
- Occupations: Poet, writer, novelist, playwright
- Spouse(s): Dagny Juel Przybyszewska, Jadwiga Kasprowicz
- Children: Zenon Przybyszewski Westrup
- Writing career
- Language: Polish, German
- Period: Young Poland

Stanisław Przybyszewski (Polish pronunciation: [staˈɲiswaf pʂɨbɨˈʂɛfskʲi]; 7 May 1868 – 23 November 1927) was a Polish novelist, dramatist, and poet of the decadent naturalistic school. His drama is associated with the Symbolist movement. He wrote both in Polish and in German.

== Life ==
Stanisław Feliks Przybyszewski was born in Łojewo near Kruszwica during the partitions of Poland. The son of a local teacher, Józef Przybyszewski, Stanisław attended a German gymnasium in Toruń, graduating in 1889. He left for Berlin, where he first studied architecture and then medicine. It was there that he became fascinated by the philosophy of Nietzsche, began referring to himself as a Satanist, and immersed himself into the bohemian life of the city.

In Berlin, he lived with—but did not marry—Martha Foerder. They had had three children together: two before he left her to marry Dagny Juel on 18 August 1893 and one during his marriage to Dagny. From 1893 to 1898, he lived with Juel (formerly a model for Edvard Munch), sometimes in Berlin and at others in Juel's hometown of Kongsvinger, in Norway. They frequented with other artists Zum schwarzen Ferkel in Berlin.

In 1896, he was arrested in Berlin on suspicion of the murder of his common-law wife Martha but released after it was determined that she had died of carbon monoxide poisoning. After Martha's death, the children were sent to different foster homes. In the autumn of 1898, he and Juel moved to Kraków, where he set himself up as the leader of a group of revolutionary young artists and as editor of their mouthpiece Życie (Life). He remained a fervent apostle of industrialism and self-expression.

He traveled to Lviv and visited the Polish poet and playwright Jan Kasprowicz. Przybyszewski started an affair with Kasprowicz's second wife, Jadwiga Gąsowska. Kasprowicz married Jadwiga in 1893; his first marriage to Teodozja Szymańska in 1886 ended in divorce after a few months.

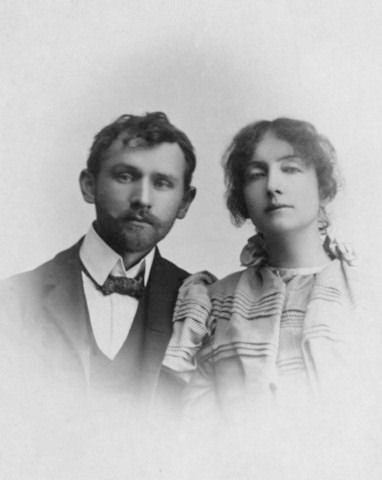
Dagny and Stanisław Przybyszewski in 1897/1898

In 1899, Przybyszewski abandoned Juel and set up a house with Jadwiga in Warsaw. Around this time, he was also involved with Aniela Pająkówna, one of whose two daughters was Przybyszewski's. Dagny returned to Paris and was murdered by a young friend of hers, Władysław Emeryk, in Tbilisi in 1901.

In 1905, Przybyszewski and Jadwiga moved to Toruń, where he attempted rehabilitation from his alcoholism. While there, Jadwiga's divorce was finalized, and they married on 11 April 1905. Przybyszewski's struggle with alcoholism continued till his death.

In 1906, the couple moved to Munich, thanks to the money obtained through the sale of the manuscript of the play Śluby (The Vows). During the war, they lived for a short time in Bohemia (Czech Lands) and moved to newly re-established Poland in 1919.

In Poznań, he applied for the position of director of a literary theatre, but his work with German political brochures during the war prevented the appointment. He got a job working as a German translator for the post office. In 1920, he found work in the Free City of Danzig (Gdańsk) with the railways. He lived in Gdańsk until 1924 and managed a Polish bookshop there. Afterward, he tried to settle in Toruń, Zakopane, and Bydgoszcz, all without success. At last, he found work in Warsaw, in the offices of the president. He lived in rooms in the old Royal Castle. In 1927, he returned to the Kujawy region and died in Jaronty in November of that year, aged 59.

He wrote a number of successful novels, of which Homo Sapiens, the most popular, has been translated into English.

Przybyszewski is considered to be the precursor of contemporary 20th-century intellectual Satanism. August Strindberg called him "a brilliant Pole" ("der geniale Pole") and said that he "influenced German literature in the last decade of the nineteenth century like few others".

== Works ==
- Zur Psychologie des Individuums (1892)
- De Profundis (1895)
- Vigilien (1895)
- Homo Sapiens (1896)
- Die Synagoge des Satan (1897); Synagoga szatana (1899 Polish edition); The Synagogue of Satan (English edition)
- Satans Kinder (1897); Children of Satan (2023 English edition)
- Das große Glück (1897)
- Epipsychidion (1900)
- Androgyne (1900)
- Totentanz der Liebe (1902)
- Synowie ziemi (1905)
- Gelübde (1906)
- Polen und der heilige Krieg (1915)
- Z polskiej duszy. Próba (pisma o zrozumieniu narodu) (1917)
- Krzyk (1918)
- Moi współcześni (1928)

=== Drama ===
- The Eternal Fairy-Tale
- The Golden Fleece
- The Snow (Śnieg, 1903)
- For Happiness (Dla szczęścia)

== See also ==
- Culture of Kraków
- List of Polish people
- Stanisława Przybyszewska
- "Trajectory of a Comet: Poland's Arch-Decadent", by Brian R. Banks, in Wormwood, no.6 (Tartarus Press, United Kingdom)
