= Emmanuelle Debever =

French actress (1963–2023)

- Born: 8 August 1963; Marseille, France
- Died: 6 December 2023 (aged 60); Paris, France
- Occupation: Actress
- Years active: 1982–1989

Emmanuelle Debever (8 August 1963 – 6 December 2023) was a French actress.

== Biography ==
Debever made her debut in the early 1980s in the series Joëlle Mazart, a sequel to the very popular Pause café, with Véronique Jannot.

In 1983, she landed the lead role in Un jeu brutal by Jean-Claude Brisseau, in which she starred opposite Bruno Cremer. The same year, she starred in Andrzej Wajda's Danton as Louison Danton, the young wife of revolutionary figure Georges Jacques Danton, played by Gérard Depardieu. She also played a supporting role in the comedy My Other Husband, by George Lautner, with Miou-Miou, followed by the telefilm thriller Quidam alongside Richard Bohringer.

In 1986, she appeared in an episode of the series Médecins de nuit. In 1989, she appeared in her final acting role, an episode of Les Enquêtes du commissaire Maigret.

In June 2019, after learning that French prosecutors were dropping their rape investigation against Gérard Depardieu, Debever posted on Facebook, accusing the actor of having groped her during the filming of Danton.

Debever died on 6 December 2023, at the age of 60. Her death was first reported by Libération, which initially reported the date as 7 December. The newspaper later issued a correction, citing Debever's sister. Debever died after a week of hospitalization following a suicide attempt in which she jumped off a bridge into the Seine. Debever had been reported missing by her partner on 29 November after disappearing from their home and leaving a concerning note. Because Debever died a day before French television aired a report on the sexual assault allegations against Depardieu, it was speculated that her death was linked to the broadcast. Prosecutors in Paris have opened an investigation to determine the causes of her death.

== Filmography ==
=== Film ===
Year	Title	Role	Director	Notes
1982	Sweet Inquest on Violence	Marianne	Gérard Guérin	
1983	Danton	Louison Danton	Andrzej Wajda	
1983	My Other Husband	la jeune fille à la piscine	Georges Lautner	
1983	Un jeu brutal	Isabelle	Jean-Claude Brisseau	
1983	Vive la sociale !	Gisèle	Gérard Mordillat	
1983	Le Grain de sable	Midinette	Pomme Meffre	
1984	Paris vu par... 20 ans après		Bernard Dubois	

=== Television ===
Year	Title	Role	Notes
1982	Joëlle Mazart	Corinne	6 episodes
1984	Quidam	Alice	Telefilm
1986	La Barbe-bleue	la morte	Telefilm
1986	Médecins de nuit	Marie-Charlotte Morgane	Episode: "Marie-Charlotte"
1988	Marc et Sophie	Emmanuelle	Episode: "Cousine cousine"
1989	Les Enquêtes du commissaire Maigret	Rita	Episode: "L'Amoureux de madame Maigret"
