= Danton (1932 film) =

1932 film

- Directed by: André Roubaud
- Written by: Jean Letillois
- Produced by: Pierre Guerlais
- Starring: Jacques Grétillat; Jacques Dumesnil; Andrée Ducret
- Cinematography: Léonce-Henri Burel
- Edited by: René Le Hénaff
- Production company: Établissements Pierre Guerlais
- Distributed by: La Photoscopie
- Release date: October 14, 1932
- Running time: 88 minutes
- Country: France
- Language: French

Danton is a 1932 French historical drama film directed by André Roubaud and starring Jacques Grétillat, Andrée Ducret and Jacques Dumesnil. It depicts the life of the French revolutionary Georges Danton and his eventual execution by hardliners of the Revolution. It was based in part on the 1929 play The Danton Case by Stanisława Przybyszewska.

== Cast ==
- Jacques Grétillat - Danton
- Andrée Ducret - Gabrielle Danton
- Jacques Dumesnil - Fabre d'Églantine
- André Fouché - Camille Desmoulins
- Simone Rouvière - Lucile Desmoulins
- Octave Berthier - Le père Charpentier
- Marguerite Weintenberger - Louise Danton
- Louis Merlac - Le boucher Legendre
- Thomy Bourdelle - Le général Westermann

== Bibliography ==
- Oscherwitz, Dayna. Past Forward: French Cinema and the Post-Colonial Heritage. SIU Press, 2010.
- Stam, Robert & Raengo, Alessandra. A Companion to Literature and Film. John Wiley & Sons, 2004.
