= Satanism =

Religious, ideological, or philosophical beliefs based on Satan

The inverted pentagram is a widespread symbol of Satanism.

Satanism is a group of religious, ideological, or philosophical beliefs based on Satan—particularly his worship or veneration. Because of the ties to the historical Abrahamic religious figure, Satanism—as well as other religious, ideological, or philosophical beliefs that align with Satanism—is considered a countercultural Abrahamic religion.

The phenomenon of Satanism shares "historical connections and family resemblances" with the Left Hand Path milieu of other occult figures such as Asmodeus, Beelzebub, Hecate, Lilith, Lucifer, Mephistopheles, Pan, Prometheus, Samael, and Set. Self-identified Satanism is a relatively modern phenomenon, largely attributed to the 1966 founding of the Church of Satan by Anton LaVey in the United States—an atheistic group that does not believe in a supernatural Satan.

Accusations of groups engaged in "devil worship" have echoed throughout much of Christian history. During the Middle Ages, the Inquisition led by the Catholic Church alleged that various heretical Christian sects and groups, such as the Knights Templar and the Cathars, performed secret Satanic rituals. In the subsequent Early Modern period, belief in a widespread Satanic conspiracy of witches resulted in the trials and executions of tens of thousands of alleged witches across Europe and the North American colonies, peaking between 1560 and 1630. The terms Satanist and Satanism emerged during the Reformation and Counter-Reformation (1517–1700), as both Catholics and Protestants accused each other of intentionally being in league with Satan.

Since the 19th century, various small religious groups have emerged that identify as Satanist or use Satanic iconography. While the groups that appeared after the 1960s differed greatly, they can be broadly divided into nontheistic Satanism and theistic Satanism. Those venerating Satan as a supernatural deity are unlikely to ascribe omnipotence, instead relating to Satan as a patriarch. Nontheistic Satanists regard Satan as a symbol of certain human traits, a useful metaphor without ontological reality. Contemporary religious Satanism is predominantly an American phenomenon, although the rise of globalization and the Internet have seen these ideas spread to other parts of the world.

== Etymology and definitions ==
=== Etymology ===
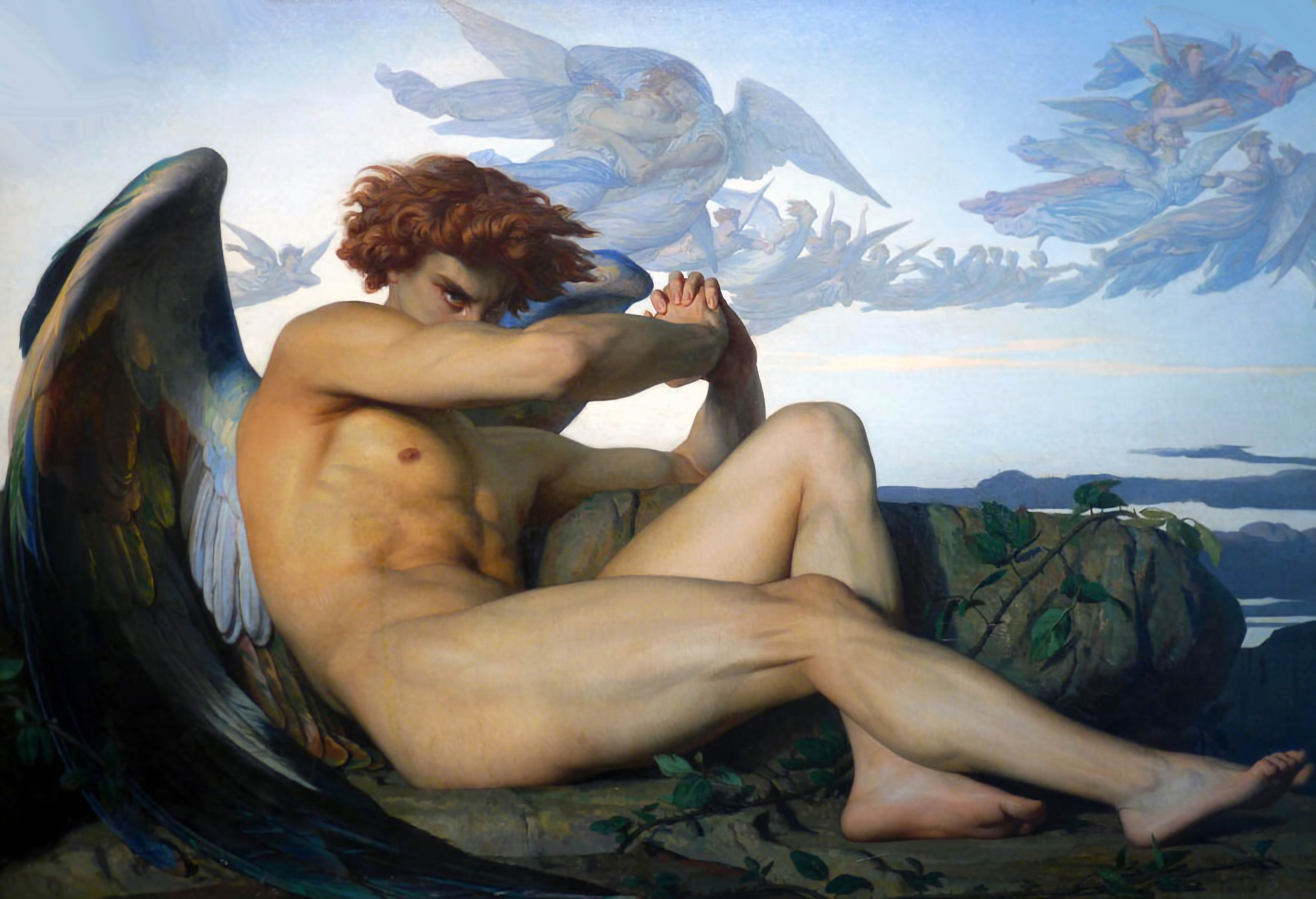
The Fallen Angel (1847) by Alexandre Cabanel

The term Satan has evolved from a Hebrew term for "adversary" or "to oppose", into the Christian figure of a fallen angel who tempts mortals into sin. The word Satan was not originally a proper name, but rather an ordinary noun that means "adversary". In this context, it appears at several points in the Old Testament. For instance, in the Book of Samuel, David is presented as the satan ("adversary") of the Philistines, while in the Book of Numbers, the term appears as a verb, when Jehovah sent an angel to satan ("to oppose") Balaam.

Prior to the composition of the New Testament, the idea developed within Jewish communities that Satan was the name of an angel who had rebelled against Jehovah and had been cast out of Heaven along with his followers; this account would be incorporated into contemporary texts such as the Book of Enoch. This Satan was then featured in parts of the New Testament, where he was presented as a figure who tempts humans to commit sin; in the Book of Matthew and the Book of Luke, he attempted to tempt Jesus of Nazareth as the latter fasted in the wilderness.

While the early Christian idea of the Devil was not well developed, it gradually adapted and expanded through the creation of folklore, art, theological treatises, and morality tales, thus providing the character with a range of extra-Biblical associations. Beginning in the early middle ages, the concept developed in Christianity of the devil as "archrepresentative of evil", and of the Satanist "as malign mirror image of the good Christian".

The word Satanism was adopted into English from the French satanisme. The terms Satanism and Satanist are first recorded as appearing in the English and French languages during the 16th century, when they were used by Christian groups to attack other, rival Christian groups. In a Roman Catholic tract of 1565, the author condemns the "heresies, blasphemies, and sathanismes [sic]" of the Protestants. In an Anglican work of 1559, Anabaptists and other Protestant sects are condemned as "swarmes of Satanistes [sic]". As used in this manner, the term Satanism was not used to claim that people literally worshipped Satan, but instead that they deviated from true Christianity, and thus were serving the will of Satan. During the 19th century, the term Satanism began to be used to describe those considered to lead a broadly immoral lifestyle, and it was only in the late 19th century that it came to be applied in English to individuals who were believed to consciously and deliberately venerate Satan. This latter meaning had appeared earlier in the Swedish language; the Lutheran Bishop Laurentius Paulinus Gothus had described devil-worshipping sorcerers as Sathanister in his Ethica Christiana, produced between 1615 and 1630.

=== Definitions ===
Some definitions of Satanism:

- the worship or veneration of the figure from Christian belief known as Satan, the Devil or Lucifer
- the "intentional, religiously motivated veneration of Satan"
- "a system in which Satan is celebrated in a prominent position" This definition has the advantage of avoiding "assumptions about the nature of religion".
- the simultaneous presence of three characteristics:

1) the worship of the character in the Bible whose name is Satan or Lucifer,
2) the organization of these "Satanists" into a group with at least some kind of organization and hierarchy, and ...
3) and has some kind of ritual or liturgical practices [...]

whether the group with these characteristics perceives Satan as personal or impersonal, real or symbolic, does not matter.

But these definitions of Satanism are limited to

- figures and groups who identify as Satanists or at least admirers of Satan (Romantic Satanists, hellfire clubs and modern Satanists).

... excluding

- figures and groups accused of worshipping Satan and in the process committing horrible crimes (in the middle ages, during the 1980–1994 Satanic ritual abuse moral panic, etc.) but who either appear to have not been satanists or to not have actually existed.

According to Laycock, excluding the second group, you leave out most of the history of Satanism.

If you do include both groups, you have two sides with very different views on who or what Satan was/is and represented. The accusers usually follow the Christian idea of Satan as an irredeemably evil fallen angel who seeks the destruction of both God and humanity, but who, along with his followers, is doomed to fail and to suffer eternal punishment. While the self-identified Satanists often do not believe that Satan actually exists as a being (they believe he is a symbol and a "Promethean figure", "an esoteric symbol of a vital force that permeates the universe"), let alone is trying to destroy humanity.

Definitions that would include the "satanism" of heresy crusades and moral panics is:

- an invention of Christianity, relying on a character deriving from Christian mythology, i.e. Satan.

In their study of Satanism, the religious studies scholars Asbjørn Dyrendal, James R. Lewis, and Jesper Aa. Petersen stated that the term Satanism "has a history of being a designation made by people against those whom they dislike; it is a term used for 'othering'".

Eugene Gallagher noted that Satanism was usually "a polemical, not a descriptive term".

Similar to the way certain Christian denominations accuse each other of heresy, different satanic groups—mainly the Church of Satan (CoS), the Temple of Set (ToS), the Order of Nine Angles (ONA), and The Satanic Temple (TST)—often accuse one another of being fraudulent Satanists and/or ignorant of true Satanism.

=== Related terms ===
Because the original concept of Satan came from Judaism and was embraced by Christianity, and because Satanists, almost by definition, oppose the teachings of those religions, people drawn to Satanism will often move on to "post-Satanism", i.e. to a religion that does not declare itself "Satanic", but includes elements of Satanism (e.g. Temple of Set). Others may regards themselves as Satanists but promote mythological figures and traditions outside of Christianity or Judaism. These religions are sometimes called Satanic and sometimes post-Satanic. (Note: For example the Temple of Set, despite being a splinter group of the Church of Satan, venerates the deity Set, considering Set to be the true name of Satan.)

Diane E. Taub and Lawrence D. Nelson complain that Satanism "is frequently defined either too broadly or too narrowly", with accusers sometimes including non-satanic groups such as Santeria, Witchcraft, Eastern religions as well as Freemasonry; and academics (for example Carlson and Larue) and others sometimes restricting its definition to "recognized Satanic churches and their members", excluding those who "believes in a literal Satan". Taub and Nelson define Satanism as "the literal or symbolic worship of Satan, the enemy of the Judeo-Christian God".

== Devil in society ==
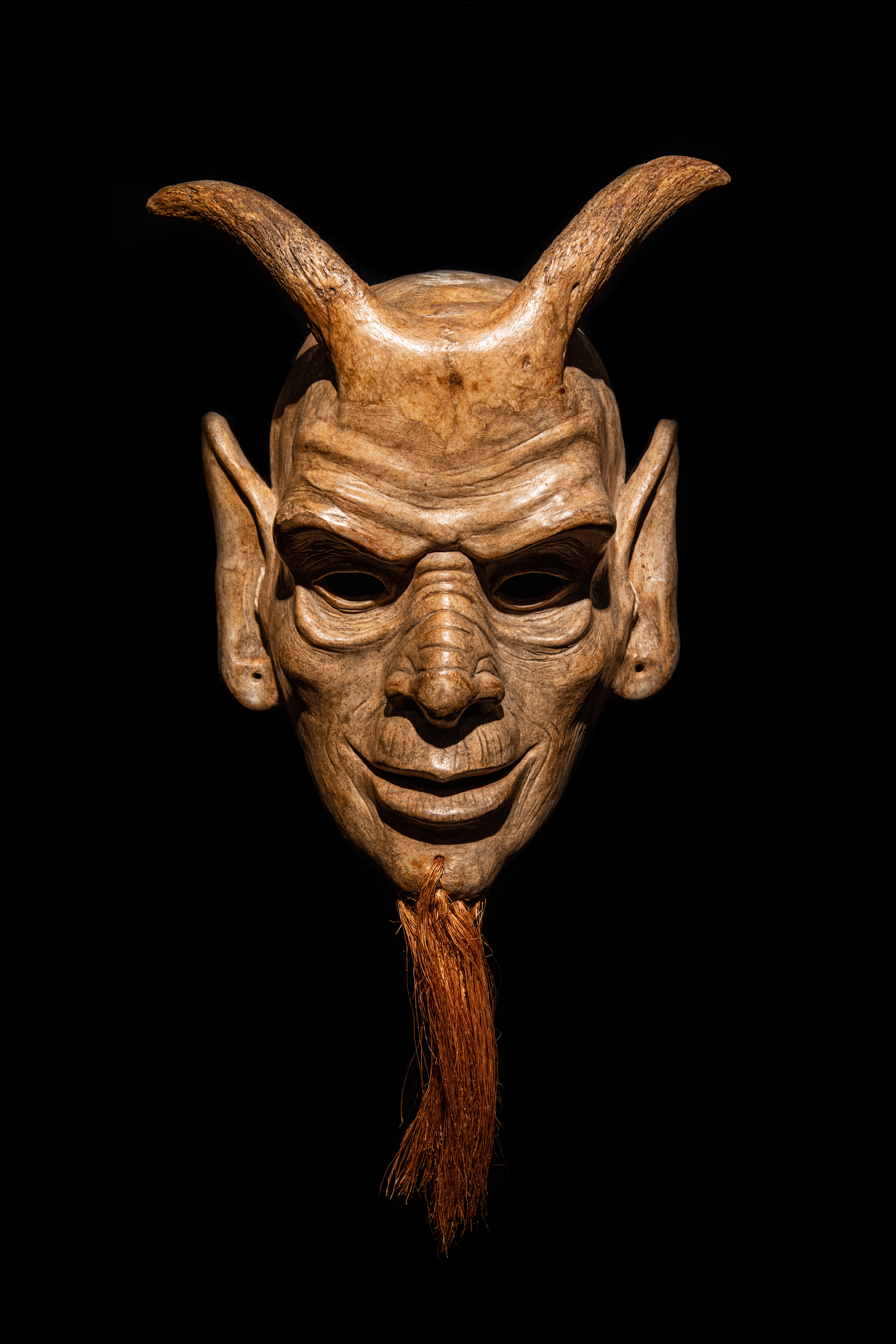
Devil mask from Portugal

Historical and anthropological research suggests that nearly all societies have developed the idea of a sinister and anti-human force that can hide itself within society. This commonly involves a belief in witches, a group of individuals who invert the norms of their society and seek to harm their community, for instance by engaging in incest, murder, and cannibalism. Allegations of witchcraft may have different causes and serve different functions within a society. For instance, they may serve to uphold social norms, to heighten the tension in existing conflicts between individuals, or to scapegoat certain individuals for various social problems.

Another contributing factor to the idea of Satanism is the concept that there is an agent of misfortune and evil who operates on a cosmic scale, something usually associated with a strong form of ethical dualism that divides the world clearly into forces of good and forces of evil. The earliest such entity known is Angra Mainyu, a figure that appears in the Persian religion of Zoroastrianism. This concept was also embraced by Judaism and early Christianity, and although it was soon marginalized within Jewish thought, it gained increasing importance within early Christian understandings of the cosmos.

The Native South American terrible god Tiw is traditionally honored with the syncretic dance and parade Diablada ('Dance of the Devils') that was opposed to the Catholic Church in origin.

== Accusations of Satanism ==
According to author Arthur Lyons, "Satanic religions are as old as monotheism and have their origins in Persia of the sixth century", (Note: An abstract of Lyon's book appeared on US Department of Justice, Office of Justice Programs web page.) and Joe Carter of the conservative ecumenical journal First Things writes that "real satanism has been around since the beginning of history, selling an appealing message: Your eyes will be opened, and you will be like God." (Note: In the 19th century, Charles Baudelaire (and others with variations of the wording) was quoted saying, "The greatest trick the Devil ever pulled was convincing the world he didn't exist.")

On the other hand, religious scholar Joseph Laycock writes that the "available evidence suggests" that Satanism began as "an imaginary religion Christians invented to demonize their opponents". Confessions of worship of Satan came only after torture or other forms of coercion in early modern Europe. While early stories of satanic activity have been commonly labeled and regarded as propaganda based on falsehood, they also partially shaped the beliefs of what would become modern religious Satanism. Those who absorbed and accepted the tales sometimes began to imitate them (celebrating Black Masses for example), a process known to folklorists as "ostension".

=== Medieval and Early Modern Christendom ===
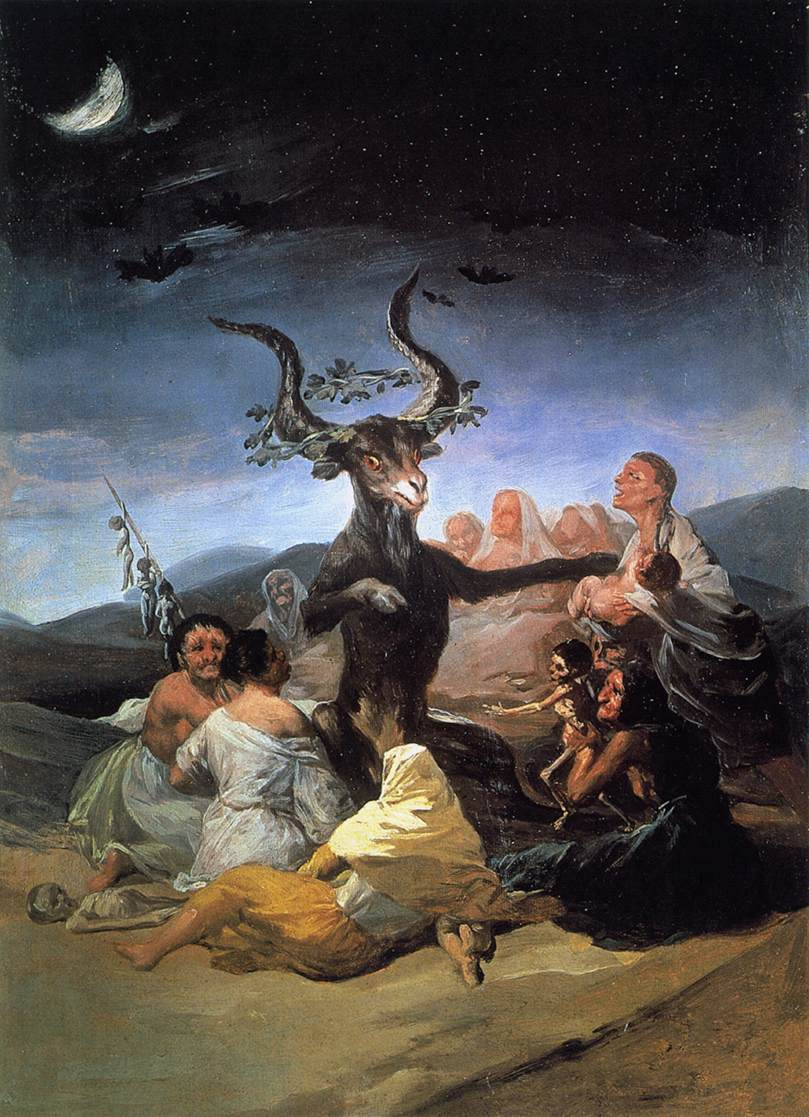
Francisco de Goya's Witches' Sabbath (1789), which depicts the Devil flanked by Satanic witches. The witch-cult hypothesis states that such stories are based upon a real-life pagan cult that revered a horned god.

As Christianity expanded throughout the Middle East, North Africa, and Europe, it came into contact with a variety of other religions, which it regarded as "pagan". Christianity being a monotheist religion, Christian theologians believed that since there was only one God (the God of Christianity) the gods and goddesses with supernatural powers venerated by these "pagans" could not be genuine divinities but must actually be demons. However, they did not believe that "pagans" were deliberately worshipping devils, but were instead simply misguided and unaware of the "true" God.

Those Christian groups regarded as heretics by the Roman Catholic Church were treated differently, with theologians arguing that they were deliberately worshipping the Devil. This was accompanied by claims that such individuals engaged in acts of evil—incestuous sexual orgies, the murder of infants, and cannibalism—all stock accusations that had previously been leveled at Christians themselves in the Roman Empire. In Christian iconography, the Devil and demons were given the physical traits of figures from classical mythology, such as the god Pan, fauns, and satyrs.

The first recorded example of such an accusation being made within Western Christianity took place in Toulouse in 1022, when two clerics were tried for allegedly venerating a demon. Throughout the Middle Ages, this accusation would be applied to a wide range of Christian heretical groups, including the Paulicians, Bogomils, Cathars, Waldensians, and the Hussites. The Knights Templar were accused of worshipping an idol known as Baphomet, with Lucifer having appeared at their meetings in the form of a cat. As well as these Christian groups, these claims were also made about Europe's Jewish community. In the 13th century, there were also references made to a group of "Luciferians" led by a woman named Lucardis which hoped to see Satan rule in Heaven. References to this group continued into the 14th century, although historians studying the allegations concur that these Luciferians were probably a fictitious invention.

Within Christian thought, the idea developed that certain individuals could make a pact with Satan. This may have emerged after observing that pacts with gods and goddesses played a role in various pre-Christian belief systems, or that such pacts were also made as part of the Christian cult of saints. Another possibility is that it derives from a misunderstanding of Augustine of Hippo's condemnation of augury in his On Christian Doctrine, written in the late 4th century. Here, he stated that people who consulted augurs were entering quasi pacts (covenants) with demons. The idea of the diabolical pact made with demons was popularized across Europe in the story of Faust, probably based in part on the real life Johann Georg Faust.

As the late medieval gave way to the early modern period, European Christendom experienced a schism between the established Roman Catholic Church and the breakaway Protestant movement. In the ensuing Reformation and Counter-Reformation (1517–1700 CE), both Catholics and Protestants accused each other of deliberately being in league with Satan. It was in this context that the terms Satanist and Satanism emerged.

==== Witch trials ====
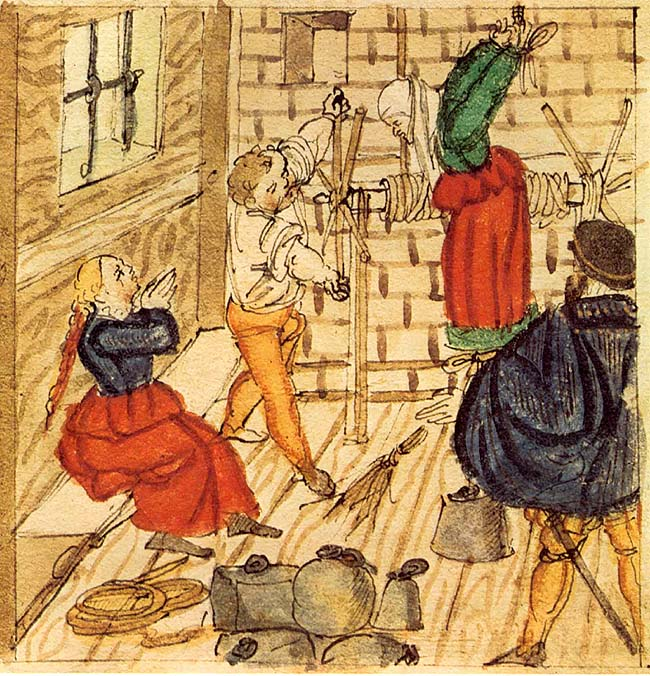
The torture used against accused witches, 1577. Estimates of the number of people executed for witchcraft in Europe vary between 40,000 and 60,000.

The early modern period also saw fear of Satanists reach its "historical apogee" in the form of the witch trials of the fifteenth to the eighteenth centuries, when between 40,000 and 60,000 were executed, almost all in Europe. This came about as the accusations which had been leveled at medieval heretics, among them that of devil-worship, were applied to the pre-existing idea of the witch, or practitioner of malevolent magic. The idea of a conspiracy of Satanic witches was developed by educated elites, although the concept of malevolent witchcraft was a widespread part of popular belief, and folkloric ideas about the night witch, the wild hunt, and the dance of the fairies were incorporated into it. The earliest trials took place in Northern Italy and France, before spreading it out to other areas of Europe and to Britain's North American colonies, being carried out by the legal authorities in both Catholic and Protestant regions.

Most historians agree that the majority of those persecuted in these witch trials were innocent of any involvement in Devil worship. Historian Darren Eldridge writes that claims that there actually was a cult of devil-worshippers being pursued by witch hunters "have not survived the scrutiny of surviving trial records" done by historians from 1962 to 2012. However, in their summary of the evidence for the trials, the historians Geoffrey Scarre and John Callow thought it "without doubt" that some of those accused in the trials had been guilty of employing magic in an attempt to harm their enemies and were thus genuinely guilty of witchcraft.

==== Affair of the Poisons ====
In a scandal starting with the poisoning of three people, prominent members of the French aristocracy, including members of the king's inner circle, were implicated and sentenced on charges of poisoning and witchcraft. Between 1677 and 1682, during the reign of King Louis XIV, 36 people were executed in Satanic panic known to history as the Affair of the Poisons. At least some of the accusers were implicated others under torture and in hopes of saving their lives. These highly unreliable reports include what "may be the first report of a satanic mass using a woman as an altar".

=== 18th- to 20th-century Christendom ===
Stanislas de Guaita drew the original goat pentagram, which first appeared in the book La Clef de la Magie Noire in 1897. Adaptations of this inverted pentagram would later become synonymous with Baphomet.

The Enlightenment and Scientific Revolution changed humanity's understanding of the world. The mathematics of Isaac Newton and psychology of John Locke "left little space for the intervention of supernatural beings". Charles Darwin's theory of evolution undermined the doctrine of the Fall in the Garden of Eden and the role of the diabolical serpent, while also providing an "alternative account of human evil" in the form of "a residual effect of our animal nature". The Industrial Revolution and urbanization disturbed traditional social relations and folk ideas to undermine belief in witchcraft and the devil. Understanding of disorders of the mind undercut demonic possession. But while the hunting and killing of alleged witches waned, belief in Satan did not disappear.

During the 18th century, gentleman's social clubs became increasingly prominent in Britain and Ireland, among the most secretive of which were the Hellfire Clubs, which were first reported in the 1720s. The most famous of these groups was the Order of the Knights of Saint Francis, which was founded circa 1750 by the aristocrat Sir Francis Dashwood and which assembled first at his estate at West Wycombe and later in Medmenham Abbey. A number of contemporary press sources portrayed these as gatherings of atheist rakes where Christianity was mocked, and toasts were made to the Devil. Beyond these sensationalist accounts, which may not be accurate portrayals of actual events, little is known about the activities of the Hellfire Clubs. Introvigne suggested that they may have engaged in a form of "playful Satanism" in which Satan was invoked "to show a daring contempt for conventional morality" rather than to pay homage to him.

The French Revolution of 1789 dealt a blow to the hegemony of the Roman Catholic Church in parts of Europe, and soon a number of Catholic authors began making claims that it had been masterminded by a conspiratorial group of Satanists. Among the first to do so was French Catholic priest Jean-Baptiste Fiard, who publicly claimed that a wide range of individuals, from the Jacobins to tarot card readers, were part of a Satanic conspiracy. Fiard's ideas were furthered by Alexis-Vincent-Charles Berbiguier de Terre-Neuve du Thym (1765–1851), who devoted a lengthy book to this conspiracy theory; he claimed that Satanists had supernatural powers allowing them to curse people and to shapeshift into both cats and fleas. Although most of his contemporaries regarded Berbiguier as suffering from mental illness, his ideas gained credence among many occultists, including Stanislas de Guaita, a Cabalist who used them for the basis of his book, The Temple of Satan.

A reaction to this was the Taxil hoax in 1890s France, where an anti-clerical writer Léo Taxil (aka Marie Joseph Gabriel Antoine Jogand-Pagès), publicly converted to Catholicism and then published several works alleging to expose the Satanic doings of Freemasons. In 1897, Taxil called a press conference promising to introduce a key character of his stories but instead announced that his revelations about the Freemasons were made up, and thanked the Catholic clergy for helping to publicize his stories. Nine years later he told an American magazine that at first he thought readers would recognize his tales as obvious nonsense, "amusement pure and simple", but when he realized they believed his stories and that there was "lots of money" to be made in publishing them, he continued to perpetrate the hoax. Around the same time, another convert to Catholicism Joris-Karl Huysmans, also helped promote the concept of active Satanist groups in his 1891 work Là-bas (Down There). Huysmans "helped to cement" the idea the black mass as Satanic rite and inversion of the Roman Catholic mass, with a naked woman for an altar. (Unlike Taxil, his conversion was apparently genuine and his book was published as fiction.)

In the early 20th century, the British novelist Dennis Wheatley produced a range of influential novels in which his protagonists battled Satanic groups. At the same time, non-fiction authors such as Montague Summers and Rollo Ahmed published books claiming that Satanic groups practicing black magic were still active across the world, although they provided no evidence that this was the case. During the 1950s, various British tabloid newspapers repeated such claims, largely basing their accounts on the allegations of one woman, Sarah Jackson, who claimed to have been a member of such a group. In 1973, the British Christian Doreen Irvine published From Witchcraft to Christ, in which she claimed to have been a member of a Satanic group that gave her supernatural powers, such as the ability to levitate, before she escaped and embraced Christianity.

In the United States during the 1960s and 1970s, various Christian preachers—the most famous being Mike Warnke in his 1972 book The Satan-Seller—claimed that they had been members of Satanic groups who carried out sex rituals and animal sacrifices before discovering Christianity. According to Gareth Medway in his historical examination of Satanism, these stories were "a series of inventions by insecure people and hack writers, each one based on a previous story, exaggerated a little more each time".

Other publications made allegations of Satanism against historical figures. The 1970s saw the publication of the Romanian Protestant preacher Richard Wurmbrand's book in which he argued—without corroborating evidence—that the socio-political theorist Karl Marx had been a Satanist.

=== Ritual abuse hysteria ===
At the end of the 20th century, a moral panic arose from claims that a Devil-worshipping cult was committing sexual abuse, murder, and cannibalism in its rituals, and including children among the victims of its rites. Initially, the alleged perpetrators of such crimes were labeled "witches", although the term Satanist was soon adopted as a favored alternative, and the phenomenon itself came to be called "the Satanism Scare". Those active in the scare alleged that there was a conspiracy of organized Satanists who occupied prominent positions throughout society, from the police to politicians, and that they had been powerful enough to cover up their crimes.

Preceded by some significant but isolated episodes in the 1970s, a great Satanism scare exploded in the 1980s in the United States and Canada and was subsequently exported towards England, Australia, and other countries. It was unprecedented in history. It surpassed even the results of Taxil's propaganda, and has been compared with the most virulent periods of witch hunting. The scare started in 1980 and declined slowly between 1990... and 1994, when official British and American reports denied the real existence of ritual satanic crimes. Particularly outside the U.S. and U.K., however, its consequences are still felt today.

— Sociologist of religion Massimo Introvigne, 2016

One of the primary sources for the scare was Michelle Remembers, a 1980 book by the Canadian psychiatrist Lawrence Pazder in which he detailed what he claimed were the repressed memories of his patient (and wife) Michelle Smith. Smith had claimed that as a child she had been abused by her family in Satanic rituals in which babies were sacrificed and Satan himself appeared. In 1983, allegations were made that the McMartin family—owners of a preschool in California—were guilty of sexually abusing the children in their care during Satanic rituals. The allegations resulted in a lengthy and expensive trial, in which all of the accused would eventually be cleared. The publicity generated by the case resulted in similar allegations being made in various other parts of the United States.

A key claim by the "anti-Satanists" of the Satanic Scare was that any child's claim about Satanic ritual abuse must be true, because children do not lie. Although some involved in the anti-Satanism movement were from Jewish and secular backgrounds, a central part was played by fundamentalist and evangelical Christians, in particular Pentecostal Christians, with Christian groups holding conferences and producing books and videotapes to promote belief in the conspiracy. Various figures in law enforcement also came to be promoters of the conspiracy theory, with such "cult cops" holding various conferences to promote it. The scare was later imported to the United Kingdom through visiting evangelicals and became popular among some of the country's social workers, resulting in a range of accusations and trials across Britain.

In the late 1980s, the Satanic Scare had lost its impetus following increasing skepticism about such allegations, and a number of those who had been convicted of perpetrating Satanic ritual abuse saw their convictions overturned. In 1990, an agent of the U.S. Federal Bureau of Investigation, Ken Lanning, revealed that he had investigated 300 allegations of Satanic ritual abuse and found no evidence for Satanism or ritualistic activity in any of them. In the UK, the Department of Health commissioned the anthropologist Jean La Fontaine to examine the allegations of SRA. She noted that while approximately half did reveal evidence of genuine sexual abuse of children, none revealed any evidence that Satanist groups had been involved or that any murders had taken place. She noted three examples in which lone individuals engaged in child molestation had created a ritual performance to facilitate their sexual acts, with the intent of frightening their victims and justifying their actions, but that none of these child molesters were involved in wider Satanist groups.

By 1994, the Satanic ritual abuse hysteria had died down in the US and UK, and by the 21st century, hysteria about Satanism has waned in most Western countries, although allegations of Satanic ritual abuse continued to surface in parts of continental Europe and Latin America. In the United States SRA ideas persisted among much of the public even as law enforcement had grown tired of false leads. A 1994 survey for the women's magazine Redbook reported in 1994,

- 70 percent of those polled "believe that at least some people who claim that they were abused by satanic cults as children, but repressed the memories for years, are telling the truth"
- 32 percent agreed with the statement, "The FBI and the police ignore evidence because they don't want to admit the cults exist", and
- 22 percent agreed that cult leaders use brainwashing to ensure that the victims would not tell.

=== QAnon ===
Another Satanic conspiracy theory arose in the United States by 2017, with unsubstantiated allegations of organized Devil-worshippers in prominent positions committing sexual abuse, murder, and cannibalism. The source of such claims began within a far-right political movement, made by an anonymous individual or individuals known as "Q", which were relayed and developed by online communities and influencers. The central QAnon claim purports that a global child sex trafficking ring made up of Democratic politicians, Hollywood actors, high-ranking government officials, business tycoons, and medical experts, were kidnapping, sexually abusing and eating children, but that (then-President) Donald Trump would round up the cabal and bring them to justice in a climactic event known to supporters as "the storm". With the lack of any evidence of child abuse or harm, and failure of the prophesized "storm" to appear before the inauguration of a new president, the conspiracy has waned but not entirely disappeared.

== Precursors of modern Satanism ==
=== Literary ===
From the late 1600s through to the 1800s, the character of Satan was increasingly rendered unimportant in western philosophy, and ignored in Christian theology, while in folklore he came to be seen as a foolish rather than a menacing figure. The development of new values in the Age of Enlightenment (in particular, those of reason and individualism) contributed to a shift in many Europeans' concept of Satan. In this context, a number of individuals took Satan out of the traditional Christian narrative and reread and reinterpreted him in light of their own time and their own interests, in turn generating new and different portraits of Satan.

The shifting concept of Satan owes many of its origins to John Milton's epic poem Paradise Lost (1667), in which Satan features as the protagonist. Milton was a Puritan and had never intended for his depiction of Satan to be a sympathetic one. However, in portraying Satan as a victim of his own pride who rebelled against the Judeo-Christian god, Milton humanized him and also allowed him to be interpreted as a rebel against tyranny. In this vein, the 19th century saw the emergence of what has been termed literary Satanism or romantic Satanism, where in poetry, plays, and novels, God is portrayed not as benevolent but using His omnipotent power for tyranny. Whereas in Christian doctrine Satan was an enemy of not only god but humanity, in the romantic portrayal he was a brave, noble, rebel against tyranny, a friend to other victims of the all powerful bully, i.e. humans. These writers saw Satan as a metaphor to criticize the power of churches and state and to champion the values of reason and liberty.

This was how Milton's Satan was understood by John Dryden and later readers such as the publisher Joseph Johnson, and the anarchist philosopher William Godwin, who reflected it in his 1793 book Enquiry Concerning Political Justice. Paradise Lost gained a wide readership in the 18th century, both in Britain and in continental Europe, where it had been translated into French by Voltaire. Milton thus became "a central character in rewriting Satanism" and would be viewed by many later religious Satanists as a "de facto Satanist".

According to Ruben van Luijk, this cannot be seen as a "coherent movement with a single voice, but rather as a post factum identified group of sometimes widely divergent authors among whom a similar theme is found". For the literary Satanists, Satan was depicted as a benevolent and sometimes heroic figure, with these more sympathetic portrayals proliferating in the art and poetry of many romanticist and decadent figures. For these individuals, Satanism was not a religious belief or ritual activity, but rather a "strategic use of a symbol and a character as part of artistic and political expression".

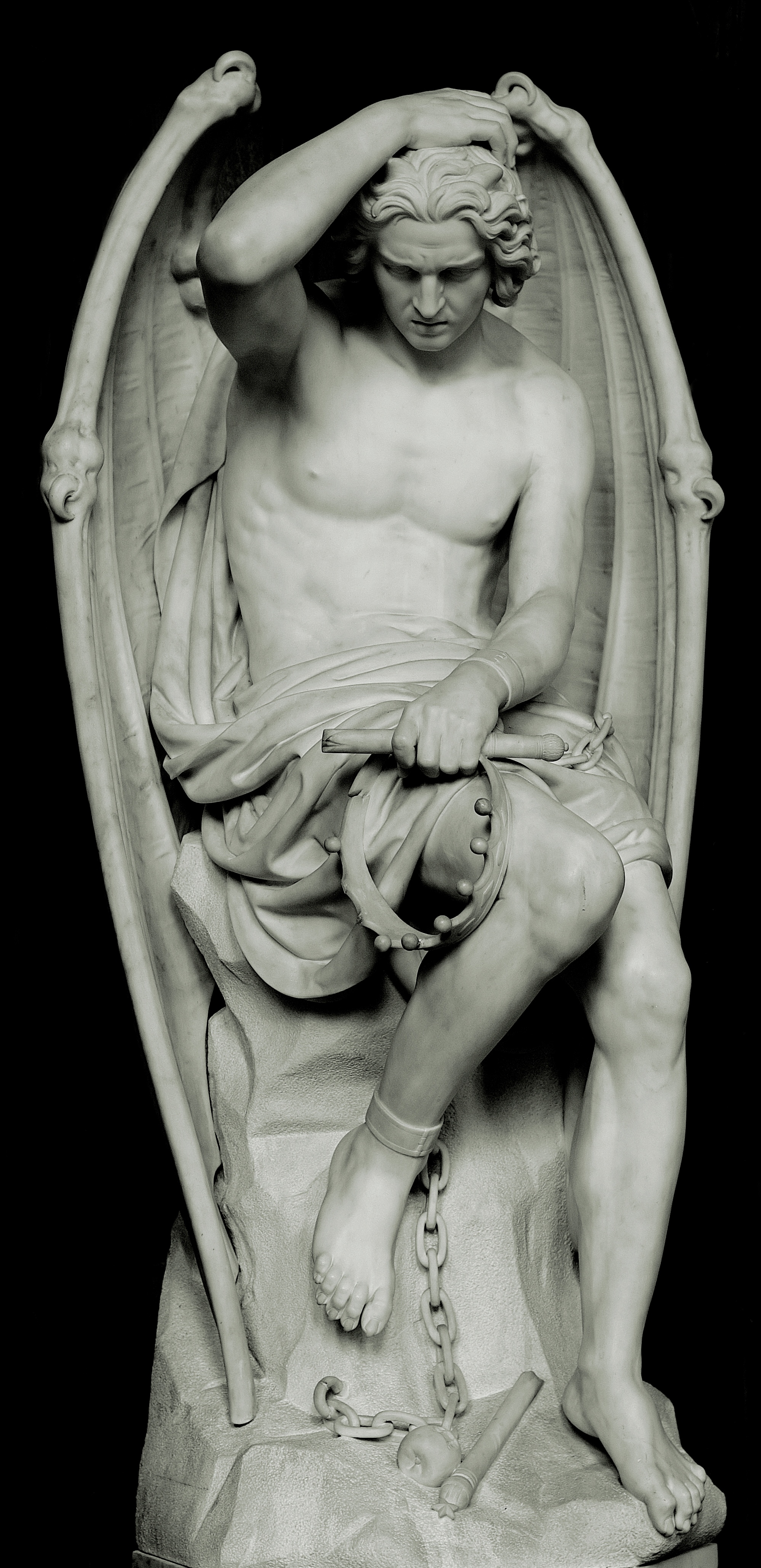
Guillaume Geefs, Le génie du mal, 1848

Among the romanticist poets to adopt this concept of Satan was the English poet Percy Bysshe Shelley, who had been influenced by Milton. In his poem Laon and Cythna, Shelley praised the "serpent", a reference to Satan, as a force for good in the universe. Another was Shelley's fellow British poet Lord Byron, who included Satanic themes in his 1821 play Cain, which was a dramatization of the Biblical story of Cain and Abel. These more positive portrayals also developed in France; one example was the 1823 work Eloa by Alfred de Vigny. Satan was also adopted by the French poet Victor Hugo, who made the character's fall from Heaven a central aspect of his La Fin de Satan, in which he outlined his own cosmogony. Although the likes of Shelley and Byron promoted a positive image of Satan in their work, there is no evidence that any of them performed religious rites to venerate him, and thus they cannot be considered to be religious Satanists.

Radical left-wing political ideas had been spread by the American Revolution of 1775–83 and the French Revolution of 1789–99. The figure of Satan, who was seen as having rebelled against the tyranny imposed by Jehovah, was appealing to many of the radical leftists of the period. For them, Satan was "a symbol for the struggle against tyranny, injustice, and oppression... a mythical figure of rebellion for an age of revolutions, a larger-than-life individual for an age of individualism, a free thinker in an age struggling for free thought". The French anarchist Pierre-Joseph Proudhon, who was a staunch critic of Christianity, embraced Satan as a symbol of liberty in several of his writings. Another prominent 19th century anarchist, the Russian Mikhail Bakunin, similarly described the figure of Satan as "the eternal rebel, the first freethinker and the emancipator of worlds" in his book God and the State. These ideas probably inspired the American feminist activist Moses Harman to name his anarchist periodical Lucifer the Lightbearer. The idea of this "Leftist Satan" declined during the 20th century.

=== Occult ===
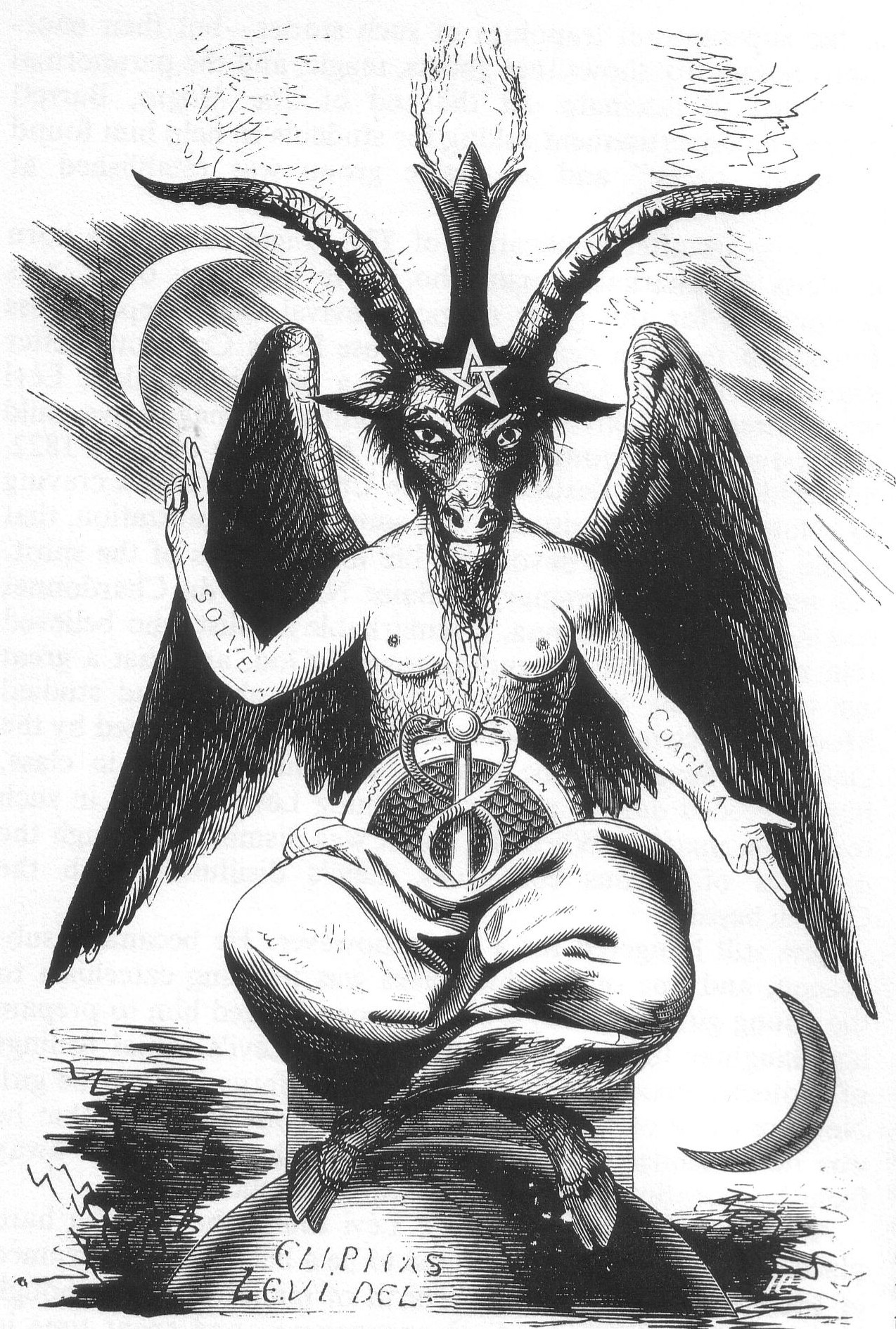
The Sabbatic Goat, also known as the Goat of Mendes or Baphomet, as illustrated by Éliphas Lévi, has become one of the most common symbols of Satanism.

In 17th-century Sweden, a number of highway robbers and other outlaws living in the forests informed judges that they venerated Satan because he provided more practical assistance than Jehovah, practices now regarded as "folkloric Satanism".

The figure of "Lucifer" was taken up by the French ceremonial magician Éliphas Lévi (1810–1875), who shocked convention by turning the traditional figure of evil into a brave rebel against tyranny. Lévi has been described as a "Romantic Satanist", a Romantic literary movement that formed no organizations and did not worship Satan, but did make a crucial break away from the traditional Christian figure of the "Lord of Darkness" doomed to failure and punishment for his wickedness. They reimagined Satan as an enemy of God the powerful, but not of the weak and mortal human race. In other words, a figure humans could sympathize with. As Lévi moved toward political conservatism in later life, he retained the use of the term, but instead applied it to what he believed was a morally neutral facet of "the absolute".

Lévi was not the only occultist who used the term Lucifer without adopting the term Satan in a similar way. The early Theosophical Society believed that "Lucifer" was a force that aided humanity's awakening to its own spiritual nature; the Society began publishing the journal Lucifer in 1887.

The first person to promote an explicitly "Satanic" philosophy was the Polish writer Stanisław Przybyszewski (1868–1927), a "decadent Bohemian" who based his ideology on Social Darwinism of the 1890s, publishing The Synagogue of Satan in 1897.

Danish occultist Carl William Hansen (1872–1936), who used the pen name Ben Kadosh, listed "Luciferian" as his religious affiliation in answer to the Danish national census (his wife and children were listed as Lutheran), making him among the earliest "self-declared Satanists". Hansen sought to spread a cult of Satan/Lucifer, and was involved in a variety of esoteric groups, including Martinism, Freemasonry, and Ordo Templi Orientis, drawing on their ideas to establish his own philosophy. He provided a Luciferian interpretation of Freemasonry in a 1906 pamphlet, although his work had little influence outside of Denmark.

Throughout his life British occultist Aleister Crowley (1875–1947) was widely described as a Satanist, usually by detractors. Crowley did not consider himself a Satanist, nor did he worship Satan, as he did not accept the Christian world view in which Satan was believed to exist. He nevertheless used imagery considered satanic, for instance, describing himself as "the Beast 666" and referring to the Whore of Babylon in his work, sending "Antichristmas cards" to his friends later in life. Crowley "in many ways embodies the pre-Satanist esoteric discourse on Satan and Satanism through his lifestyle and his philosophy", with his "image and thought" becoming an "important influence" on the later development of religious Satanism. Both Crowley and LaVey "cultivated a sinister public image and sported shaved heads".

In 1928, the Fraternitas Saturni (FS) was established in Germany; its founder, Eugen Grosche, published Satanische Magie ("Satanic Magic") that same year. The group connected Satan to Saturn, claiming that the planet related to the Sun in the same manner that Lucifer relates to the human world.

Maria de Naglowska, a Russian occultist who had fled to France following the Russian Revolution, established the esoteric group Brotherhood of the Golden Arrow in Paris in 1932. She promoted a theology centered on what she called the Third Term of the Trinity consisting of Father, Son, and Sex, the last of which she deemed to be most important. Her early disciples, who underwent what she called "Satanic Initiations", included models and art students recruited from bohemian circles. The Golden Arrow disbanded after Naglowska abandoned it in 1936. Hers was "a quite complicated Satanism, built on a complex philosophical vision of the world, of which little would survive its initiator".

Herbert Sloane claims Our Lady of Endor Coven, a Satanic group based in Toledo, Ohio, was founded in 1948. Describing his Satanic tradition as the Ophite Cultus Sathanas, the group first came to public attention in 1969. The group had a Gnostic doctrine about the world, in which the Judeo-Christian creator god is regarded as evil, and the Biblical serpent is presented as a force for good, who had delivered salvation to humanity in the Garden of Eden. Sloane's claim of a 1940s origin remain unproven: potentially fabricated to make his group appear older than the (1966) establishment of the Church of Satan.

== Contemporary tendencies and groups ==
"The intentional, religiously motivated veneration of Satan" is the "working definition" of Satanism of historian of religion Ruben van Luijk, comes in different forms. Satanism has been called a "new religious movement", and other times judged too diffuse to merit that description and been called instead a "milieu" (Dyrendal, Lewis, and Petersen), united by "family resemblance", and the fact that most of them were self religions. Some of the resemblances in this Satanic milieu are:

- the positive use of the term Satanist as a designation,
- an emphasis on individualism,
- a genealogy that connects them to other Satanic groups,
- a transgressive and antinomian stance,
- a self-perception as an elite, and
- an embrace of values such as pride, self-reliance, and productive non-conformity.

A minority of Satanists have some type of association with the political far-right.

Dyrendal, Lewis, and Petersen argue that the groups within the Satanic milieu can be divided into three groups: reactive Satanists, rationalist Satanists, and esoteric Satanists.

- Reactive Satanism (they believe) encompass "popular Satanism, inverted Christianity, and symbolic rebellion" and situates itself in opposition to society while at the same time conforming to society's perspective of evil.
- Rationalist Satanism is used to describe the trend in the Satanic milieu which is atheistic, skeptical, materialistic, and epicurean. According to Joseph Laycock, "most contemporary Satanists" are nontheistic.
- Esoteric Satanism applied to those forms which are theistic and draw upon ideas from other forms of Western esotericism, neopaganism, Buddhism, and Hinduism.

Diane E. Taub and Lawrence D. Nelson (publishing in 1993, at the end of the "Satanic panic") divide Satanism into two:

- "Establishment" Satanism, or the "respectable" form of Satanism that is "usually highly visible and structured", and emphasizes its law-abiding nature. (This may include both Rationalist Satanism and Esoteric Satanism.) An example of "Establishment Satanism" is the Church of Satan, which "officially condemns illegal activity". (Other Establishment Satanists are the Church of Satanic Brotherhood or the Temple of Set.) It is the variety of Satanism most studied by academic sociologists, who also represent Satanism in their "discourse" as "harmless, law-abiding alternative religions", ignoring the second type of Satanism ...
- "Underground" Satanism, the Satanism of "reputed criminal elements", and the variety that lay groups and the media tend to focus on (especially during the Satanic Panic of the 1980s). (Satanic Underground may be similar to Reactive Satanism.) Information on the underground is often less than reliable, as reports are sensational and the Satanists themselves are secretive. Establishment and Underground Satanism conflict, the first wanting to preserve its social acceptance and tax-exempt status that the sensational crimes or alleged crimes of the underground put in jeopardy. How much cause and effect there is between Underground Satanism and crime comes into question because according to at least one report, "nearly worshipping criminal has had a history of anti-social behavior ... long before taking up occult trappings.") On the other hand, evidence of personality disorders does not mean the disorder sufferer does not have sincere Satanic beliefs.

Contemporary religious Satanism is predominantly an American phenomenon but has spread elsewhere via globalization and the Internet, allowing for intra-group communication and creation of a forum for Satanist disputes. Satanism started to reach Central and Eastern Europe in the 1990s—in time with the fall of the Communist Bloc—and most noticeably in Poland and Lithuania, predominantly Roman Catholic countries.

=== Nontheistic Satanism ===
==== LaVeyan Satanism and Church of Satan ====
The sigil of Baphomet, official insignia of the Church of Satan and LaVeyan Satanism

Satanism as "a self-declared religion" began in 1966 with the founding of the Church of Satan (CoS) by Anton Szandor LaVey. Religious scholars have called the Church not only the oldest, continuous satanic organization but the most influential, with "numerous imitator and breakaway groups".

The church was founded in San Francisco, California, in an era when there was much public interest in the occult, witchcraft, and Satanism. A "gigantic media circus" developed around Anton LaVey, "the Father of Satanism" and his Satanic aesthetics. LaVey shaved his head, wore a goatee, performed Black Masses with nude women serving as altars. He was invited on national talk shows and mingled with celebrities attending his satanic parties. As an entrepreneur, he saw an opening for a new religion in the spiritual void of a secularizing post-Christian West.

But LaVey also promoted his ideas and his 1969 Satanic Bible as "the best-known and most influential statement of Satanic theology". It sold nearly a million copies. These had "very little" connection with "either Satan or the worship of Satan", but were based on the Romantic literary concept of Satan, not as a symbol of evil, but as a rebel anti-hero, defying God's tyranny with charisma and bravery. Together with the romanticism, "humanism, hedonism, aspects of pop psychology and the human potential movement" were woven together by LaVey, and publicized with "a lot of showmanship". Philosopher Ayn Rand, who argued that "selfishness" is a virtue in that "unfettered self-interest is good and altruism is destructive", was a major influence. According to both LaVey and sociologist of religion James R. Lewis, Ayn Rand's thought was a cornerstone of his philosophy, along with "ceremony and ritual" or "ritual magic".

Other influences were Friedrich Nietzsche, who celebrated the Ubermensch, proclaimed "God is dead", and preached against the 'slave's morality' of mercy, charity, and helping the weak; English occultist Aleister Crowley, famous for the axiom "Do what thou wilt shall be the whole of the [moral] Law"; and Arthur Desmond, who strongly associated with Social Darwinism and the expression "the survival of the fittest".

LaVey used Christianity as a "negative mirror" for his new faith, rejecting the basic principles, theology and values of Christian belief, along with other major religions and philosophies such as humanitarianism and liberal democracy—which he saw as negative forces. Instead of idealism, humility, abstinence, self-denigration, obedience, herd behavior, spirituality, and irrationality; he praised the seven deadly sins (i.e. pride, greed, wrath, envy, lust, gluttony and sloth), as virtues, not vices. LaVey went beyond discouraging sexual inhibitions and feelings of guilt and shame over fetishes, calling for a celebration of, and indulgence in, humanity's animal nature and its desires, which Christianity sought to suppress. Human beings should seek out the carnal rather than the spiritual; satisfying the ego's desires enhanced an individual's pride, self-respect, and self-realization. Hate, and aggression were necessary and advantageous for survival, victims should not "turn the other cheek" but take an "eye for an eye".

Satanists should be individualistic, non-conformist, contemptuous of "colorless" mainstream society. LaVey saw Satanism as something like a personality type as much as a belief, since Satanists "are outsiders by their nature", and "born, not made". Since gods are actually a creation of man and not the other way around, LaVey asked, "'Why not really be honest and if you are going to create a god in your image, why not create that god as yourself'.... every man is a god if he chooses to recognize himself as one." Not everyone would measure up to being a god however. Human social equality was a "myth", leading to "mediocrity" and support of the weak at the expense of the strong. "Social stratification" was part of LaVey and the Church's "Five Point Program".

A "true Satanic society" was described in LaVey's church's periodical The Black Flame and highlighted by anthropologist Jean La Fontaine; it would be one in which the population consists of "free-spirited, well-armed, fully-conscious, self-disciplined individuals, who will neither need nor tolerate any external entity 'protecting' them or telling them what they can and cannot do". Another version of the Satanic society envisioned by LaVey was the breeding of an elite people "superior" in their creativity and nonconformity. These would live apart from the rest of the human "herd"—who would be relegated into ghettoes, ideally "space ghettoes" located on other planets.

LaVey's ideas were also said to "seem contradictory". According to CoS priest Gavin Baddeley, LaVey's church combined "a love of life garbed in the symbols of death and fear", and while LaVey himself pontificated on personal freedom, he "micromanaged the lives of his followers". Some doubted his atheist naturalism. LaVey insisted the church scoffed at the supernatural, but also told an interviewer he considered "curses and hexes" against enemies a form of human sacrifice "by proxy".

Contradictions in his thought have been explained by his wanting it to have as wide appeal as possible, balancing, in his words, "nine parts" of "respectability" to "one part" of "outrageousness". If Satanism was to be Satanic, it required some outrageous/anti-social elements, but if it was going to be a viable organization, these could not be allowed to frighten off potential congregants and attract unwanted attention.

One "outrageous" issue that LaVey was criticized for was his "ambivalent relationship" with far-right groups (United Klans of America, National Renaissance Party, and the American Nazi Party) that he neither endorsed nor rejected.

LaVey died in 1997, but the church maintains a purist approach to his thought, insisting he and the church have "codified" Satanism as "a religion and philosophy", and dismisses other Satanist groups (atheistic or otherwise), as reverse-Christians, pseudo-Satanists or Devil worshipers.

==== First Satanic Church ====
After LaVey's death in 1997, the Church of Satan was taken over by a new administration and its headquarters were moved to New York City. LaVey's daughter, the High Priestess Karla LaVey re-founded The First Satanic Church on 1999 in San Francisco. This church has been called "a lot more exclusive" than the original and as of late 2023 was known for producing a "Black X-Mass concert" in San Francisco "every year for the last couple decades".

==== Satanic Reds ====
Differing from other Satanic organizations, the Satanic Reds, founded in 1997 by Tani Jantsang, is a unique organization blending Marxist-communist politics with Lovecraftian occultism mixed with elements of Central Asian folklore and the advocacy of social welfare; the group became notable mainly for their online activism and usage of communist symbols merged with Satanist ones. However, the Satanic Reds claim to belong to the left-hand path but do not identify as theistic Satanists in the manner of believing in Satan as a god with a personality, since they conceive it as Sat and Tan, "Being and Becoming", similarly to the fictional deity of chaos Nyarlathotep from Lovecraft's Cthulhu Mythos.

==== The Satanic Temple ====
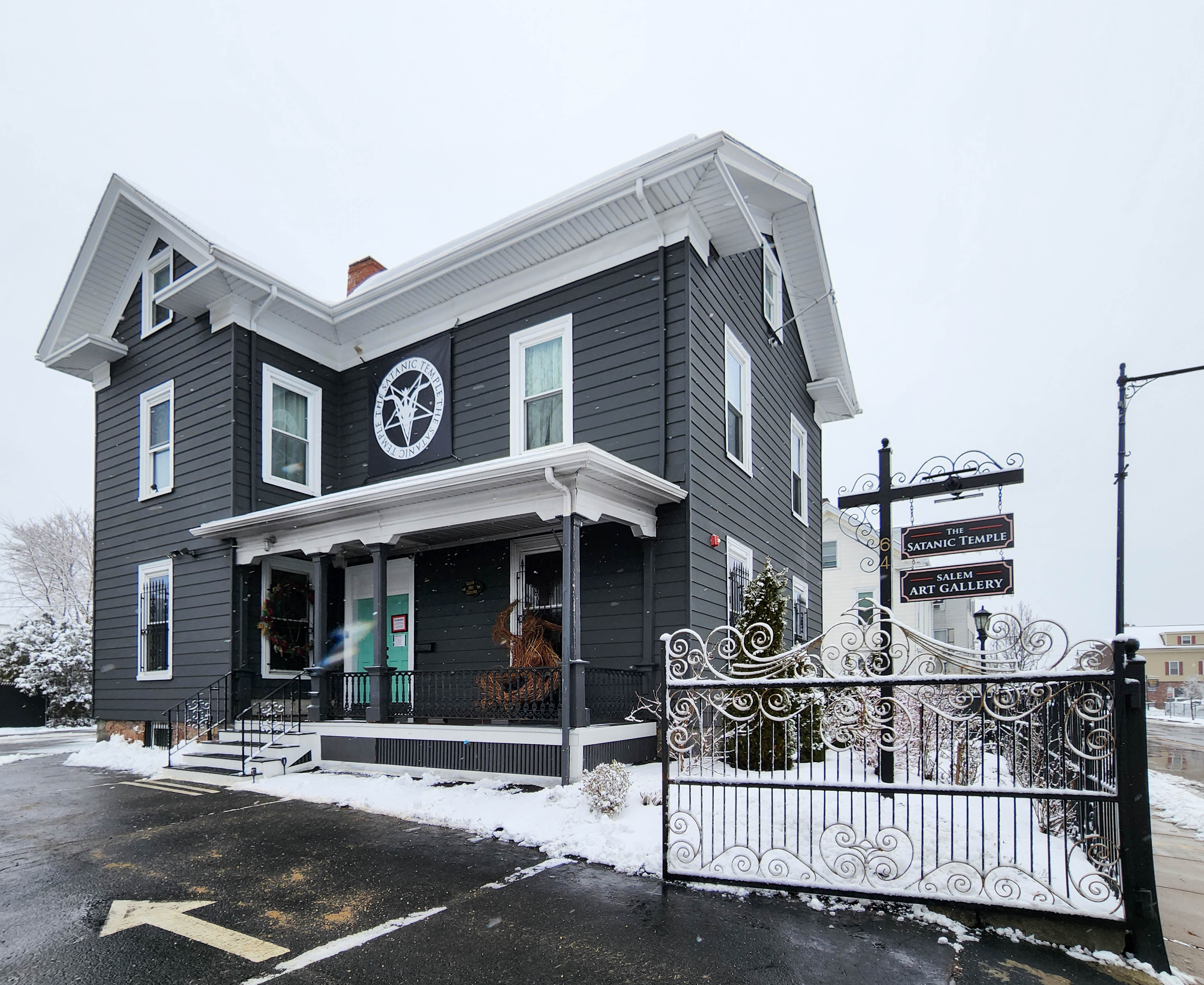
The headquarters of the Satanic Temple and Salem Art Gallery at Salem, Massachusetts

The Satanic Temple (TST), has been called the "most prominent" satanic organization "in terms of both size and public activity" as of late 2023. Based in Salem, Massachusetts and active since 2012, it claims 700,000 members worldwide. Like the older Church of Satan, its congregants do not believe in a supernatural Satan, but if the CoS saw Satanism as a "negative mirror" of Christianity, reversing Christian principles of altruism (helping the downtrodden and community-mindedness) to selfishness, the Christian principles TST wants to reverse our politically conservative activist/fundamentalist ones—the elimination of the right to abortion, of the teaching of evolution, of the separation of church and state, etc. This "left-wing", "socially engaged Satanism", involves activism, rather than the individualism and right-wing-oriented, "getting what you want for yourself", of the CoS. (Note: "The Church of Satan's Policy on Politics" is that the Church has no "'official' political position". "Politics are up to each individual member", and those members embrace all sorts of different ideologies (it then lists every conceivable ideology including Communism and Socialism), but most members will "support political candidates and movements whose goals reflect their own practical needs and desires". It also describes "the emotional drive to 'change the world'" as a "common stage of early adult development typically beginning around age 16 and lasting until around age 24". Elsewhere however, Church writings argue for things not at all consistent with any leftward or even centrist politics. According to Ruben van Luijk and Amina Lap, LaVey thought eugenics could and should be part of the human future, leading to the breeding of an elite reflecting LaVey's "Satanic" principles, who would come to power, and then hopefully relegate the rest of the human "herd" into ghettoes, ideally "space ghettoes" located on other planets.)

They have been called "rationalist, political pranksters" by Dyrendal, Lewis, and Petersen, with pranks designed to highlight religious hypocrisy and advance the cause of secularism. One such prank was performing a "Pink Mass" over the grave of the mother of the evangelical Christian and prominent anti-LGBTQ preacher Fred Phelps and claiming that the mass converted the spirit of Phelps' mother into a lesbian. The "Seven Fundamental" tenets of the temple on its website mention compassion, justice, freedom, inviolability of the human body, conforming to scientific understanding, human fallibility—but say nothing about Satan. The Temple has been described as using the literary Satan as metaphor to promote pragmatic skepticism, rational reciprocity, personal autonomy, and curiosity; and as a symbol to represent "the eternal rebel" against arbitrary authority and social norms.

The temple has also demanded the privileges the government affords Christians, such as giving prayers before city council meetings, erecting (satanic) statues on government property, and distributing its materials in public schools. As the movement became bigger, its congregations volunteered to clean highways and help the homeless, at least in part to demonstrate they were civic minded and not evil. It has made efforts at lobbying, with a focus on the separation of church and state and using satire against Christian groups that it believes interfere with personal freedom.

Lucien Greaves has described the Satanic Temple as being a progressive and updated version of LaVey's Satanism, posted a fairly detailed refutation of LaVey's doctrines, accusing the CoS of fetishizing authoritarianism, and explaining how elements of Social Darwinism and Nietzscheanism within LaVeyan Satanism are incongruent with game theory, reciprocal altruism, and cognitive science. The Church of Satan, on the other hand, has declared the TST members as only "masquerading" as Satanists, being in violation of the "five decades of a clearly defined belief system called Satanism expounded by a worldwide organization" (i.e. LaVeyan Satanism).

=== Theistic Satanism ===
Theistic Satanism, otherwise referred to as spiritual Satanism, or devil worship, is a form of Satanism with the primary belief that Satan is an actual deity or force to revere or worship. Other characteristics of theistic Satanism may include a belief in magic, which is manipulated through ritual, although that is not a defining criterion, and theistic Satanists may focus solely on devotion.

==== First Church of Satan ====
The First Church of Satan (FCoS), a splinter group that separated from LaVey's Church of Satan during the 1970s, attempts to rediscover the teachings of Aleister Crowley and believe that Anton LaVey actually was a magus in the early days of the Church of Satan but gradually renounced his powers, became isolated and embittered. Furthermore, the First Church of Satan strongly criticizes the current Church of Satan as a pale shadow of its former self, and they strive to "maintain a Satanic organization that is not hostile or manipulative toward its own members".

==== Turku Society for the Spiritual Sciences ====
Pekka Siitoin founded the satanist group called the Turku Society for the Spiritual Sciences (Turun Hengentieteen Seura) on September 1, 1971. The society stated its founding principles as "promot[ing] nationalist patriotic activity [and] development of Aryan spirituality". The society also stated opposition to capitalism, communism and "the Jewish religion based on Jehovah's tyranny." Siitoin believed in neo-Gnosticism and Theosophy and combined these with antisemitism and satanism. The society allegedly performed satanic orgies which researcher of religion Vesa Iitti opined might not be "far off from the truth". Several of the perpetrators of the Kursiivi printing house arson in November 1977 were members of the society.

==== Order of Nine Angles ====
Flag of the O9A

The Order of Nine Angles, claiming to have been established in the 1960s, rose to public recognition in the early 1980. This movement expressed the idea that groups like Church of Satan were "too benevolent and law-abiding" to be true Satanists. This notion grew, particularly among musicians and fans of extreme heavy metal music, where being more extreme meant being more authentic. These antinomian and amoral Satanic (or post-Satanic) groups are sometimes called the "sinister tradition" of Satanism.

The O9A describe their occultism as "Traditional Satanism". The O9A's writings not only encourage human sacrifice, but insist it is required in Satanism, referring to their victims as opfers. According to the Order's teachings, such opfers must demonstrate character faults that mark them out as being worthy of death. No O9A cell has admitted to carrying out a sacrifice in a ritualized manner, but rather, Order members have joined the police and military to carry out such killings.

==== Temple of Set ====
The Temple of Set is an occult left-hand path religious organization. It was founded in 1975 when Michael Aquino, the founder of a Church of Satan Grotto in Louisville, Kentucky, and editor of the Church's newsletter, The Cloven Hoof, left the church, taking 28 members with him. Aquino's anger that LaVey had devalued his high level grade of "magister" in the church may have initiated his break, but Aquino also disagreed with LaVey's materialist philosophy, arguing that while the church might publicly be materialist, Satan as symbol was "only part of the truth". Aquino held a ritual to ask Satan "where to lead" his CoS defectors and, on the night of 21–22 June 1975, Satan allegedly told him to "Reconsecrate my Temple and my Order in the true name of Set. No longer will I accept the bastard title of a Hebrew fiend." Thus Aquino came to believe that the name Satan was a corruption of the name Set, the Egyptian god of darkness. The philosophy of the Temple of Set may be summed up as "enlightened individualism"—enhancement and improvement of oneself by personal education, experiment, and initiation. This process is necessarily different and distinctive for each individual. The members do not agree on whether Set is real or symbolic, and they're not expected to.

==== Temple of the Black Light ====
The Temple of the Black Light, formerly known as the Misanthropic Luciferian Order, is a Satanic occult order founded in Sweden in 1995. The group espouses a philosophy known as "Chaosophy". Chaosophy asserts that the world that mankind lives in, and the universe that it lives in, all exist within the realm known as Cosmos. Cosmos is made of three spatial dimensions and one linear time dimension. Cosmos rarely ever changes and is a materialistic realm. Another realm that exists is known as Chaos. Chaos exists outside of the Cosmos and is made of infinite dimensions and unlike the Cosmos, it is always changing. Members of the TotBL believe that the realm of Chaos is ruled over by 11 dark gods, the highest of them being Satan, and all of said gods are considered manifestations of a higher being. This higher being is known as Azerate, the Dragon Mother, and is all of the 11 gods united as one. The TotBL believes that Azerate will resurrect one day and destroy the Cosmos and let Chaos consume everything. The group has been connected to the Swedish Black metal band Dissection, particularly its front man Jon Nödtveidt.

==== Joy of Satan Ministries ====
Joy of Satan Ministries is a western esoteric occult organization that combines Satanism, the ancient alien astronaut "hypothesis", and antisemitism. It was originally founded in the early 2000s by Maxine Dietrich (pseudonym of Andrea Maxine Dietrich), wife of the National Socialist Movement of the United States' co-founder and former leader Clifford Herrington. With its inception, spiritual Satanism was born—a current that until recently was regarded only as "theist", but then defined into "Spiritual Satanism" by theistic Satanists who concluded that the term spiritual in Satanism represented the best answer to the world, considering it a "moral slap" toward the earlier carnal and materialistic LaVeyan Satanism, and instead focusing its attention upon spiritual evolution. Joy of Satan Ministries presents a unique synthesis of theistic Satanism, Nazism, Gnosticism, neopaganism, Western esotericism, UFO conspiracy theories, and extraterrestrial hypotheses similar to those popularized by Zecharia Sitchin and David Icke.

=== Luciferianism ===
The sigil of Lucifer

Luciferians reportedly revere Lucifer not as the devil, but as a destroyer, guardian, liberator, light bringer, and/or guiding spirit to darkness, or even as the true god, as opposed to Jehovah.

=== Personal Satanism ===
In contrast to the organized and doctrinal Satanist groups is the personal Satanism of individuals, who identify as Satanists due to their affinity for the general idea of Satan, including such characteristics as viciousness and/or subversion.

Dyrendal, Lewis, and Petersen used the term reactive Satanism to describe one form of modern Satanism. They described this as an adolescent and anti-social means of rebelling in a Christian society, by which an individual transgresses cultural boundaries. which tends to fall into two tendencies:

- "Satanic tourism"—characterized by the brief period of time in which an individual was involved;
- "Satanic quest"—typified by a longer and deeper involvement.

The researcher Gareth Medway noted that in 1995 he encountered a British woman who stated that she had been a practicing Satanist during her teenage years. She had grown up in a small mining village and had come to believe that she had psychic powers. After hearing about Satanism in some library books, she declared herself a Satanist and formulated a belief that Satan was the true god. After her teenage years she abandoned Satanism and became a chaos magickian.

Some personal Satanists are teenagers or mentally disturbed individuals who have engaged in criminal activities. During the 1980s and 1990s, several groups of teenagers were apprehended after sacrificing animals and vandalizing both churches and graveyards with Satanic imagery. Introvigne stated that these incidents were "more a product of juvenile deviance and marginalization than Satanism". In a few cases, the crimes of these personal Satanists have included murder.

- In 1970, two separate groups of teenagers—one led by Stanley Baker in Big Sur, and the other by Steven Hurd in Los Angeles, killed a total of three people and consumed parts of their corpses in what they later claimed were sacrifices devoted to Satan.
- The American serial killer Richard Ramirez claimed that he was a theistic Satanist; during his 1980s killing spree he left an inverted pentagram at the scene of each murder and at his trial called out "Hail Satan!".
- In 1984 on Long Island, a group allegedly called the Knights of the Black Circle killed one of its own members, Gary Lauwers, over a disagreement regarding the group's illegal drug dealing; group members later related that Lauwers' death was a sacrifice to Satan. In particular, self-declared Satanist and alleged member of the Knights of the Black Circle, Ricky "the Acid King" Kasso, became notorious for torturing and murdering Lauwers while attempting to force Lauwers to declare "I love Satan" during the murder.
- Nikolai Ogolobyak, who confessed to being a member of a Satanic cult, was sentenced to 20 years in 2010 for the ritual killing of four teenagers in Russia's Yaroslavl region.

== Demographics ==
A survey in the Encyclopedia of Satanism found that people became involved with Satanism in many diverse ways and were found in many countries. The survey found that more Satanists were raised as Protestant Christians than Catholic.

Beginning in the late 1960s, organized Satanism emerged out of the occult subculture with the formation of the Church of Satan. It was not long, however, before Satanism had expanded well beyond the Church of Satan. The decentralization of the Satanist movement was considerably accelerated when Anton LaVey disbanded the grotto system in the mid-1970s. At present, religious Satanism exists primarily as a decentralized subculture [...] Unlike traditional religions, and even unlike the early Satanist bodies such as the Church of Satan and the Temple of Set, contemporary Satanism is, for the most part, a decentralized movement. In the past, this movement has been propagated through the medium of certain popular books, especially LaVey's Satanic Bible. In more recent years, the internet has come to play a significant role in reaching potential "converts", particularly among disaffected young people.

— Religion scholar and researcher of new religious movements James R. Lewis

Dyrendal, Lewis, and Petersen observed that from surveys of Satanists conducted in the early 21st century, it was clear that the Satanic milieu was "heavily dominated by young males". They nevertheless noted that census data from New Zealand suggested that there may be a growing proportion of women becoming Satanists. In comprising more men than women, Satanism differs from most other religious communities, including most new religious communities. Most Satanists came to their religion through reading, either online or books, rather than through being introduced to it through personal contacts. Many practitioners do not claim that they converted to Satanism, but rather state that they were born that way, and only later in life confirmed that Satanism served as an appropriate label for their pre-existing worldviews. Others have stated that they had experiences with supernatural phenomena that led them to embracing Satanism.

The surveys revealed that atheistic Satanists appeared to be in the majority, although the numbers of theistic Satanists appeared to grow over time. Beliefs in the afterlife varied, although the most common beliefs about the afterlife were reincarnation and the idea that consciousness survives bodily death. The surveys also demonstrated that most recorded Satanists practiced magic, although there were differing opinions as to whether magical acts operated according to etheric laws or whether the effect of magic was purely psychological. A number of Satanists described performing cursing, in most cases as a form of vigilante justice. Most practitioners conduct their religious observances in a solitary manner, and never or rarely meet fellow Satanists for rituals. Rather, the primary interaction that takes place between Satanists is online, on websites or via email. From their survey data, Dyrendal, Lewis, and Petersen noted that the average length of involvement in the Satanic milieu was seven years. A Satanist's involvement in the movement tends to peak in their early twenties and drops off sharply in their thirties. A small proportion retain their allegiance to the religion into their elder years. When asked about their ideology, the largest proportion of Satanists identified as apolitical or non-aligned, while only a small percentage identified as conservative. A small minority of Satanists expressed support for Nazism; conversely, over two-thirds expressed opposition or strong opposition to it.

=== 2021 Canadian census ===
The 2021 Canadian census states that 5,890 Canadians identify as Satanist, representing 0.02% of the population.

Compared to the general population, Satanists are more likely to be male, aged in their 20s or 30s, and not a member of any recognized minority group, although the Japanese are an exception (with the Japanese comprising 0.3% of both Satanists and the population as a whole).

Comparison of Satanists in Canada against the general population
		General population	Satanists
Total population		36,328,480	5,890
Gender	Male	17,937,165 (49.4%)	3,430 (58.2%)
Gender	Female	18,391,315 (50.6%)	2,460 (41.8%)
Age	0 to 14	5,992,555 (16.5%)	175 (3%)
Age	15 to 19	2,003,200 (5.5%)	210 (3.6%)
Age	20 to 24	2,177,860 (6%)	810 (13.8%)
Age	25 to 34	4,898,625 (13.5%)	2,755 (46.8%)
Age	35 to 44	4,872,425 (13.4%)	1,250 (21.2%)
Age	45 to 54	4,634,850 (12.8%)	470 (8%)
Age	55 to 64	5,162,365 (14.2%)	165 (2.8%)
Age	65 and over	6,586,600 (18.1%)	60 (1%)
Racial background	White	26,689,275 (73.5%)	5,480 (93%)
Racial background	South Asian	2,571,400 (7%)	40 (0.7%)
Racial background	Chinese	1,715,770 (4.7%)	50 (0.9%)
Racial background	Black	1,547,870 (4.3%)	100 (1.7%)
Racial background	Filipino	957,355 (2.6%)	35 (0.6%)
Racial background	Arab	694,015 (1.9%)	25 (0.4%)
Racial background	Latin American	580,235 (1.6%)	55 (0.9%)
Racial background	Southeast Asian	390,340 (1.1%)	20 (0.3%)
Racial background	West Asian	360,495 (1%)	0 (0%)
Racial background	Korean	218,140 (0.6%)	0 (0%)
Racial background	Japanese	98,890 (0.3%)	15 (0.3%)
Racial background	Other	172,885 (0.5%)	20 (0.3%)
Racial background	Multi-ethnic	331,805 (0.9%)	50 (0.8%)

== Legal recognition ==
In 2004, it was claimed that Satanism was allowed in the Royal Navy of the British Armed Forces, despite opposition from Christians. In 2016, under a Freedom of Information request, the Navy Command Headquarters stated that, "we do not recognise satanism as a formal religion, and will not grant facilities or make specific time available for individual 'worship'."

In 2005, the Supreme Court of the United States debated in the case of Cutter v. Wilkinson over protecting minority religious rights of prison inmates after a lawsuit challenging the issue was filed to them. The court ruled that facilities that accept federal funds cannot deny prisoners accommodations that are necessary to engage in activities for the practice of their own religious beliefs.

In 2019, The Satanic Temple was granted religious 501(c)(3) status.

== Metal and rock music ==
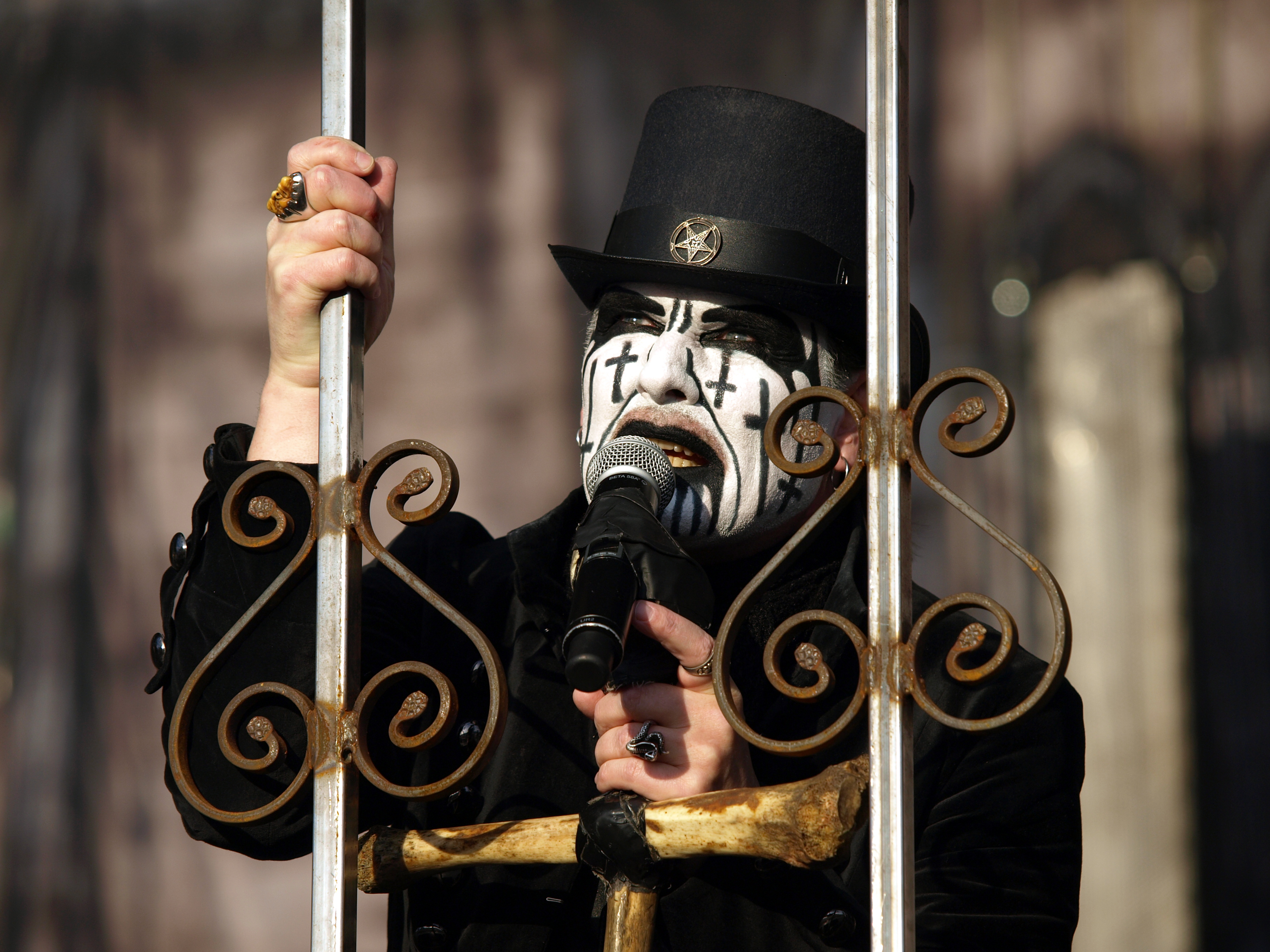
Heavy metal singer King Diamond is a member of the Church of Satan.

During the 1960s and 1970s, several rock bands— namely the American band Coven and the British band Black Widow, employed the imagery of Satanism and witchcraft in their work. References to Satan also appeared in the work of those rock bands which were pioneering the heavy metal genre in Britain during the 1970s. For example, the band Black Sabbath made mention of Satan in their lyrics, although some of the band's members were practicing Christians, and other lyrics affirmed the power of the Christian God over Satan. In the 1980s, greater use of Satanic imagery was made by heavy metal bands such as Slayer, Kreator, Sodom, and Destruction. Bands active in the subgenre of death metal—among them Morbid Angel and Entombed, also adopted Satanic imagery, combining it with other morbid and dark imagery, such as that of zombies and serial killers.

Satanism would come to be more closely associated with the subgenre of black metal, in which it was foregrounded over the other themes that had been used in death metal. A number of black metal performers incorporated self-injury into their act, framing this as a manifestation of Satanic devotion. The first black metal band, Venom, proclaimed themselves to be Satanists, although this was more an act of provocation than an expression of genuine devotion to Satan. Satanic themes were also used by the black metal bands Bathory and Hellhammer. However, the first black metal act to more seriously adopt Satanism was Mercyful Fate, whose vocalist, King Diamond, joined the Church of Satan. More often than not musicians associating themselves with black metal say they do not believe in legitimate Satanic ideology and often profess to being atheists, agnostics, or religious skeptics.

In contrast to King Diamond, various black metal Satanists sought to distance themselves from LaVeyan Satanism, for instance by referring to their beliefs as "devil worship". These individuals regarded Satan as a literal entity, and in contrast to Anton LaVey, they associated Satanism with criminality, suicide, and terror. For them, Christianity was regarded as a plague which required eradication. Many of these individuals, most prominently Varg Vikernes and Euronymous, were involved in the early Norwegian black metal scene. Between 1992 and 1996, such people destroyed around fifty Norwegian churches in arson attacks. Within the black metal scene, a number of musicians later replaced Satanic themes with those deriving from Heathenry, a form of neopaganism.

According to many Christian groups, Ozzy Osbourne, the lead singer of Black Sabbath, may have been a Satanist. Osbourne denied these allegations, stating that it was just his stage persona.

== See also ==
- Contemporary Religious Satanism
- Deal with the Devil
- Demonology
- Luciferianism
