= Satanic Reds =

Marxist-Communist Satanic organization

Logo of the Satanic Reds

The Satanic Reds is a Satanic occult organization with a Marxist-Communist political orientation founded by Tani Jantsang in 1997.

== Ideology ==
The Satanic Reds is largely based on the writings of H. P. Lovecraft mixed with elements of Central Asian folklore and the advocacy of social welfare; the group became notable mainly for their online activism and usage of communist symbols merged with Satanist ones. However, the Satanic Reds claim to belong to the left-hand path but do not identify as theistic Satanists in the manner of believing in Satan as a god with a personality, since they conceive it as Sat and Tan, "Being and Becoming", similarly to the fictional deity of chaos Nyarlathotep from Lovecraft's Cthulhu Mythos. The religious practices of the Satanic Reds comprise occult rituals and a form of baptism, and the organization advocates a "renewed New Deal", a moderate social program of reforms inspired by Franklin D. Roosevelt.

== Bibliography ==
- Lewis, James R. (2001). Satanism Today: An Encyclopedia of Religion, Folklore, and Popular Culture. Santa Barbara: ABC-CLIO. ISBN 978-1-57607-292-9.
- Introvigne, Massimo (2016). "From the 20th to the 21st Century, 1994–2016". Satanism: A Social History. Brill. pp. 506–508. doi:10.1163/9789004244962_015. ISBN 9789004244962.
