= Sweet Inquest on Violence =

1982 film

- Directed by: Gérard Guérin
- Written by: Gérard Guérin; Jacques Leduc
- Produced by: Gérard Guérin; Gérard Mordillat
- Starring: Michael Lonsdale
- Cinematography: François Catonné
- Edited by: Marc Bodin-Joyeux
- Release date: 27 October 1982
- Running time: 98 minutes
- Country: France
- Language: French

Sweet Inquest on Violence (French: Douce enquête sur la violence) is a 1982 French drama film directed by Gérard Guérin. It was entered into the 1982 Cannes Film Festival.

== Cast ==
- Michael Lonsdale - Ash, le financier
- Elise Caron - France
- Jeanne Herviale - La vieille dame
- Albert Marcoeur - Musicien
- Emmanuelle Debever - Marianne
- Claude Duneton - Paulo l'aveugle
- Nada Strancar - La soeur d'un terroriste / Visiteuse de l'appartement
- Robert Kramer - Le biologiste
- Prune Bergé - Madame Ash
- Mustapha Ami - Terroriste
- Caro - Terroriste
- Eva Hiller - Terroriste
- Zarah Lorelle - Terroriste
- Claude Hébert - Terroriste
- Walter Jones - Walter
