= Aniela Pająkówna =

Polish painter (1864–1912)

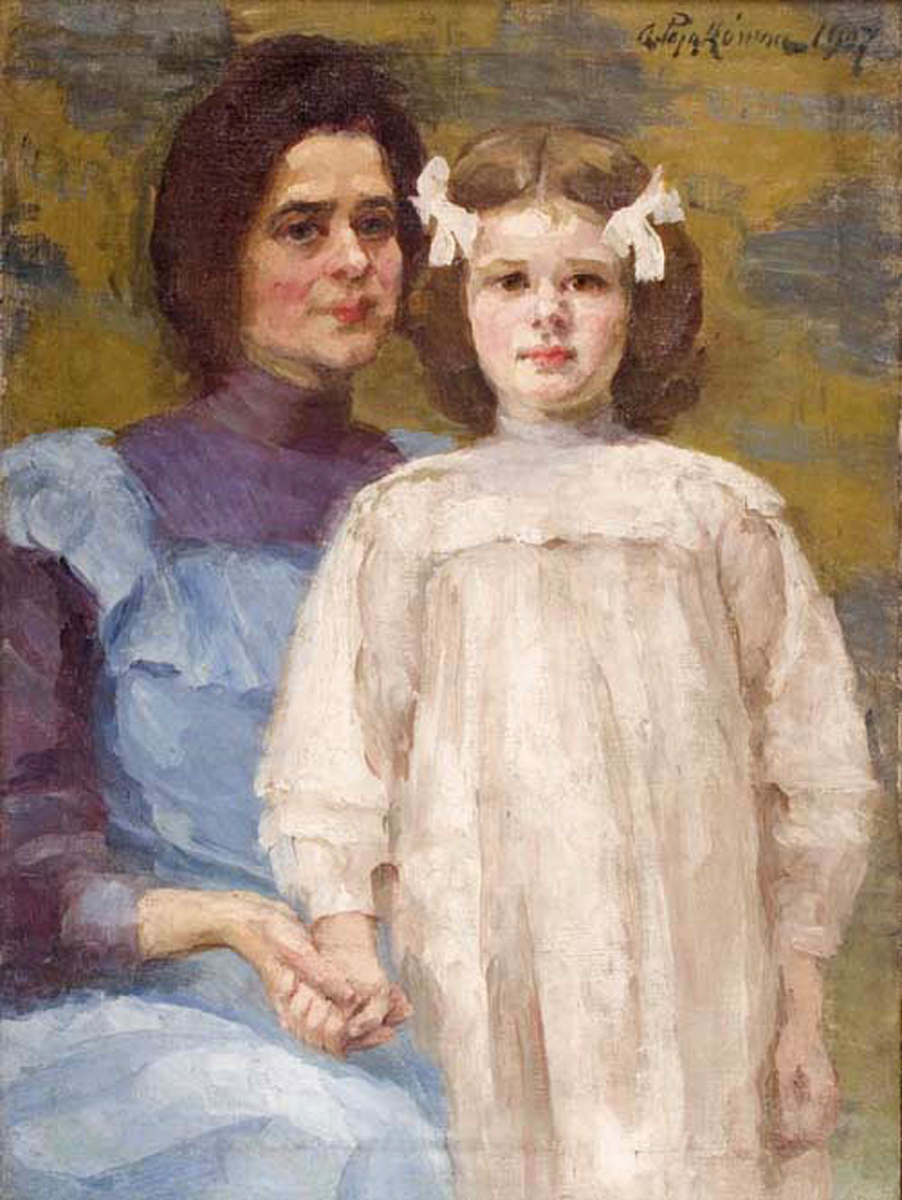
Self-portrait with her daughter (1907)

Aniela Pająkówna (1864 – 24 April 1912) was a Polish painter, mostly of portraits. Her daughter was the dramatist Stanisława Przybyszewska.

== Biography ==
She was born in Medyka. Her father was a coachman. Thanks to the generosity of his employers, the journalist and political activist Mieczysław Gwalbert Pawlikowski and his wife Helena (née Dzieduszycka), she was able to study art; first at the Academy of Fine Arts in Kraków with Florian Cynk then, after 1886, in Paris at the Académie Julian and the Académie Colarossi with Carolus-Duran and Jean-Jacques Henner. She also spent some time studying in Munich.

In 1891, she returned to Poland, settled in Lwów and set up her own studio. She had her first exhibition at the Society of Friends of Fine Art in 1896. The following year, she began to exhibit with the Kraków Society of Friends of Fine Arts and participated in a major show at the Cloth Hall in 1899. She also exhibited abroad, notably at the Vienna Künstlerhaus and the Salon des Indépendants.

In 1898, she met Stanisław Przybyszewski in Lwów, where he was giving a lecture on Chopin. Later, they had a brief affair, resulting in the birth of her daughter, Stanisława. For a time, she also took care of his daughter Iwa, from his marriage to Dagny Juel.

In 1907, facing discrimination for being a single mother with an illegitimate child, she and her daughter began moving about; first to Vienna, then Zürich and Munich, finally settling in Paris in 1909. She died there, of pneumonia, three years later. Stanisława was placed in the care of an aunt.
