= Danton (1983 film) =

- Theatrical release poster
- Directed by: Andrzej Wajda
- Written by: Jean-Claude Carrière; Andrzej Wajda; Agnieszka Holland; Bolesław Michałek; Jacek Gąsiorowski
- Based on: The Danton Case; 1929 play by Stanisława Przybyszewska
- Produced by: Margaret Ménégoz; Barbara Pec-Slesicka
- Starring: Gérard Depardieu
- Cinematography: Igor Luther
- Edited by: Halina Prugar-Ketling
- Music by: Jean Prodromidès
- Distributed by: Gaumont Distribution
- Release dates: 12 January 1983 (France); 31 January 1983 (Poland)
- Running time: 136 minutes
- Countries: France; Poland; West Germany
- Language: French
- Box office: $10.4 million

Danton (French pronunciation: [dɑ̃tɔ̃]) is a 1983 French-language film depicting the last weeks of Georges Danton, one of the leaders of the French Revolution. It is an adaptation of the 1929 play The Danton Case by Stanisława Przybyszewska.

The film stars Gérard Depardieu in the title role, with Wojciech Pszoniak as Maximilien Robespierre, and Patrice Chéreau as Camille Desmoulins. It was directed by the Polish director Andrzej Wajda and was an international co-production between companies in France, Poland and West Germany. All of Danton's supporters (with the exception of Bourdon, who would later betray him) are played by French actors, while Robespierre's allies are played by Poles. Alain Depardieu, Gérard's brother, is listed in the credits as Director of Production.

The film does not adhere strictly to the historical record. It was widely interpreted as drawing parallels between the Reign of Terror during the French Revolution and contemporary Poland, where the Solidarity movement was resisting the Soviet-backed Polish communist government. The filmmakers, however, denied that such parallels were intentional. The film recorded 1,392,779 admissions in France.

== Plot ==
The film begins in Paris in the cold spring of 1794 when the Reign of Terror is in full swing, with vehicles entering the city being searched and long lines of citizens grumbling in the rain as they wait to buy scarce bread. Ill in his flat, Robespierre sees Danton in the street, just returned from the country and being acclaimed by the hungry and dispirited people as their hero.

When Héron, head of the secret police, calls round, Robespierre instructs him to destroy the print shop of Desmoulins, who is publishing pro-Danton circulars. While Robespierre is being tended by his barber, his friend Saint-Just comes in and urges him to have Danton guillotined. He ignores him and goes to a meeting of the Committee of Public Safety, the effective government of France, where other members also push for the elimination of Danton. Robespierre resists, because Danton is so popular with the ordinary people and is his friend.

Before that day's sitting of the National Convention, the legislative assembly of the country, General Westermann discusses with Danton a coup to overthrow the tyranny of Robespierre and the Committee. Danton disapproves, even though friends warn him that Robespierre is planning to have him jailed and he should strike first. Danton is positive that the influence of his newspaper, Le Vieux Cordelier, and the support of the people will keep him safe. However, he asks his supporter Bourdon to denounce Héron and his secret police in the Convention, which leads to Héron's arrest.

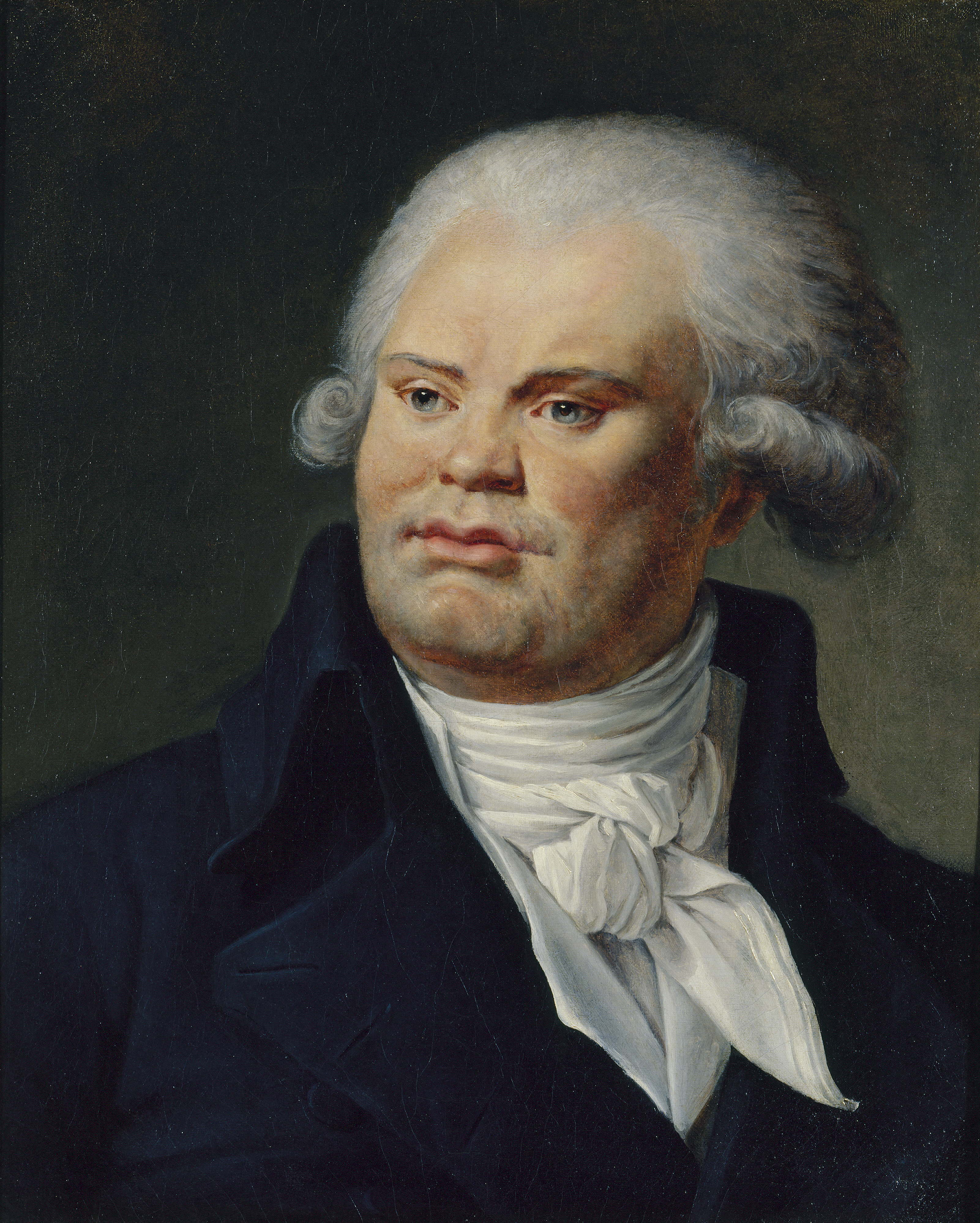
Portrait of Georges Danton

That night, Danton asks Robespierre to an elaborate dinner in a private room of a restaurant, fortifying himself in advance with copious wine. Robespierre refuses to eat and insists on a serious talk. He asks Danton to join his cause and stop fighting him, because he does not want to be forced to have Danton executed. Danton simply carries on drinking and refuses all Robespierre’s advances. After Robespierre has left in disgust, in the street Danton meets a group of armed men who turn out to be part of Westermann's preparations for a coup. Once again, Danton refuses to join their illegal venture.

Robespierre, having failed with Danton, then goes to the house of Desmoulins, who is furious that his printing business has been destroyed and refuses to talk to him. Robespierre tries to convince him that Danton is exploiting him, but is ignored. Desmoulins' wife begs Robespierre to stay and talk sense into her husband, because she wants him to live, but Robespierre can achieve nothing. He goes to the Committee of Public Safety and orders a warrant for the arrest that night of Danton, Desmoulins, Westermann and several of their associates. Though Danton could still rally support, he does not want to cause more bloodshed and accepts arrest, claiming that his oratory and the affection of the people will protect him.

At the National Convention in the morning, members are outraged at the arrests, but Robespierre simply justifies his action by stating that Danton is an enemy of the Republic and must be tried regardless of his popularity. Having escaped arrest, Bourdon hastily changes sides and backs Robespierre. When the trial opens before the Revolutionary Tribunal, only seven jurors can be found who will agree to vote Danton guilty but it continues regardless. Danton keeps breaking order to address the spectators, and the prosecutor Fouquier is unhappy because he has insufficient grounds for a conviction. Back in prison that night, Danton's confidence is shaken when another prisoner tells him how overjoyed he is to hear that Danton, the first president of the Committee and the creator of the Revolutionary Tribunal, is to be executed.

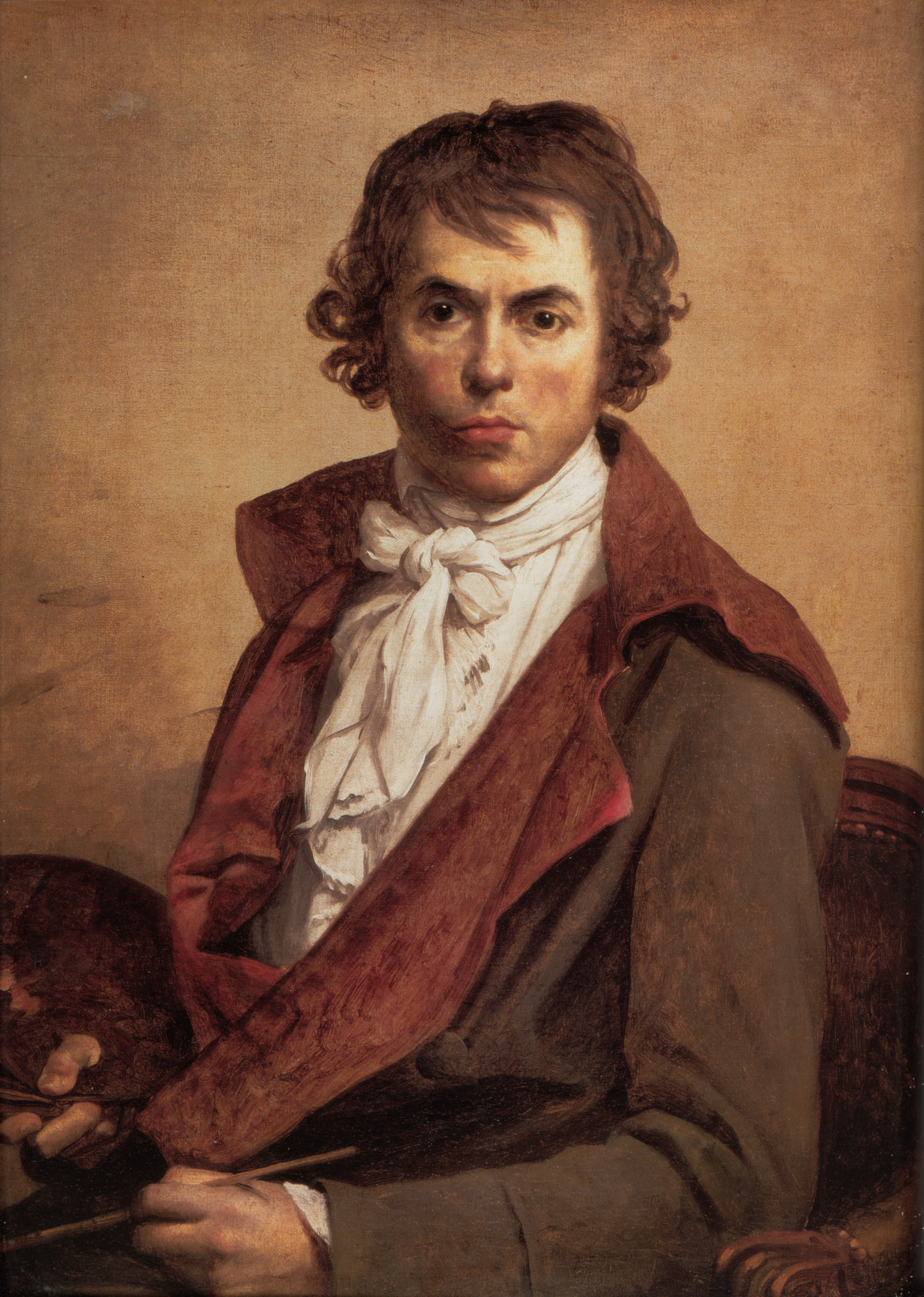
Self-portrait, Jacques-Louis David

Next day, while visiting the studio of the painter Jacques-Louis David, Robespierre is told by Fouquier that Danton's constant interruptions are making a farce of the trial, which lacks validity anyhow. Robespierre gets the Committee to issue a decree that anyone who speaks out of turn will be removed from court. Within minutes, all the accused have been bundled out and the verdict of guilty is read.

On the day before their execution Danton is depressed, not because of his death but because he feels that he has failed the people. Once the condemned men have been taken through the silent crowds to the scaffold and guillotined, Robespierre's long-maintained tension breaks and he relapses into shock. An exuberant Saint-Just tells Robespierre the news and encourages him to become a dictator; Robespierre states in horror that if a dictatorship is necessary, then this means that democracy is merely an illusion. The noble ideals of the Revolution in the Declaration of the Rights of Man and of the Citizen, recited to him by a child forced to learn it by heart, are fatally compromised.

== Principal cast ==
- Gérard Depardieu as Georges Danton
- Wojciech Pszoniak as Maximilien Robespierre
- Patrice Chéreau as Camille Desmoulins
- Bogusław Linda as Louis Antoine de Saint-Just
- Angela Winkler as Lucile Desmoulins
- Emmanuelle Debever as Louison Danton
- Andrzej Seweryn as François Louis Bourdon
- Serge Merlin as Pierre Philippeaux
- Roland Blanche as Jean-François Delacroix
- Jacques Villeret as François Joseph Westermann
- Anne Alvaro as Éléonore Duplay
- Roger Planchon as Antoine Quentin Fouquier-Tinville
- Franciszek Starowieyski as Jacques-Louis David
- Alain Macé as François Héron

== Production ==
In 2019, in the context of the sexual assault and rape accusations against Depardieu, actress Emmanuelle Debever, who played Louison Danton, accused the actor of groping her on the film's set. In December 2023, she died after a week in the hospital following a suicide attempt. Her death came one day before a documentary about the Depardieu case was shown on television, leading to speculation that it was connected to the broadcast.

== Reception ==
On the review aggregator website Rotten Tomatoes, 85% of 13 critics' reviews are positive, with an average rating of 7.8/10.

The film had been sponsored by France's first socialist government for decades, in anticipation of the bicentenary of the Revolution in 1989. Before its release, a private showing to the President of the Republic, François Mitterrand, and the Minister of Culture, Jack Lang, evoked a frosty reaction. They had not expected such a cynical tale of power politics, show trials and cold-blooded judicial murder, familiar though it all was in Eastern Europe under Soviet control.

== Awards ==
- Louis Delluc Prize 1982: Andrzej Wajda
- César 1983, Best director: Andrzej Wajda
- BAFTA Awards 1983, Best Foreign Language Film: Danton
- Montreal World Film Festival 1983, Best Actor: Gérard Depardieu & Wojciech Pszoniak
- National Society of Film Critics Awards, USA 1983, Best Actor: Gérard Depardieu
- Polish Film Festival 1984: Andrzej Wajda
- London Critics Circle Film Awards 1984, Director of the Year: Andrzej Wajda

== Home media ==
Danton was reissued on DVD and Blu-Ray, and on VOD on several streaming services.
