= The Danton Case =

Play written by Stanisława Przybyszewska

The Danton Case is a 1929 historical play by the Polish writer Stanisława Przybyszewska. The work portrays the conflict between the rival revolutionaries Maximilien Robespierre and Georges Danton during the French Revolution, particularly in the period leading up to Danton's execution. Przybyszewska wrote the play between March 1928 and March 1929 after studying the French Revolution for many years.

== Adaptations ==
The 1932 French film Danton and the 1983 Polish-French film Danton both drew inspiration from the play.

== Bibliography ==
- Braun, Kazimierz. A history of Polish theater, 1939-1989. Greenwood Publishing, 1996.
- Rokem, Freddie. Performing History: Theatrical Representations of the Past in Contemporary Theatre. University of Iowa Press, 2000
