= Children of Satan =

1897 German-language novel by Stanislav Przybyszewski

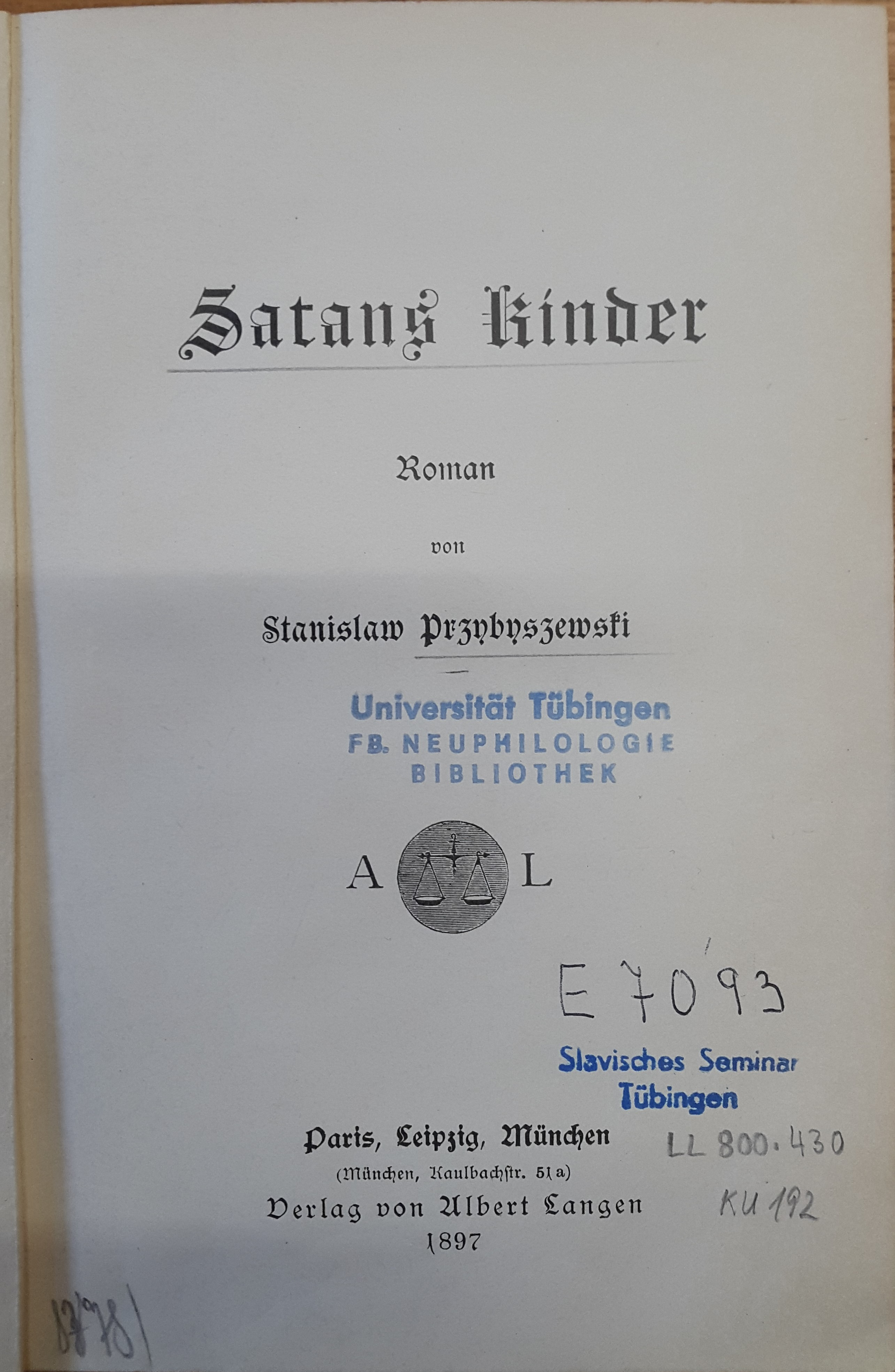
- First edition, 1897.
- Author: Stanisław Przybyszewski
- Original title: Satans Kinder
- Language: German
- Genre: Literary fiction
- Publication date: 1897

Children of Satan (German: Satans Kinder) is a novel by the Polish author Stanisław Przybyszewski, first published in German in 1897. It is recognized as the first Polish satanic novel. After its publication, the circle of artists around Przybyszewski began to be known as the "Children of Satan".

== Plot ==
In an unsuspecting small town, a group of anarchists unleashes a reign of terror. Their leader, a charismatic figure named Gordon, adeptly weaves a web of influence, surrounding himself with individuals who are lost, vulnerable, and searching for meaning in their lives. These young souls, lacking direction and purpose, are easy prey for Gordon's manipulative grasp. Exploiting their weaknesses, he emerges as their guiding force, not solely for the purpose of sowing destruction but also with the ambition to construct a new world based on his satanic ideals.

== Bibliography ==
- van Luijk, Ruben (2016). Children of Lucifer: The Origins of Modern Religious Satanism. Oxford University Press. ISBN 9780190275105.
