= The Synagogue of Satan =

1897 book by Stanislav Przybyszewski

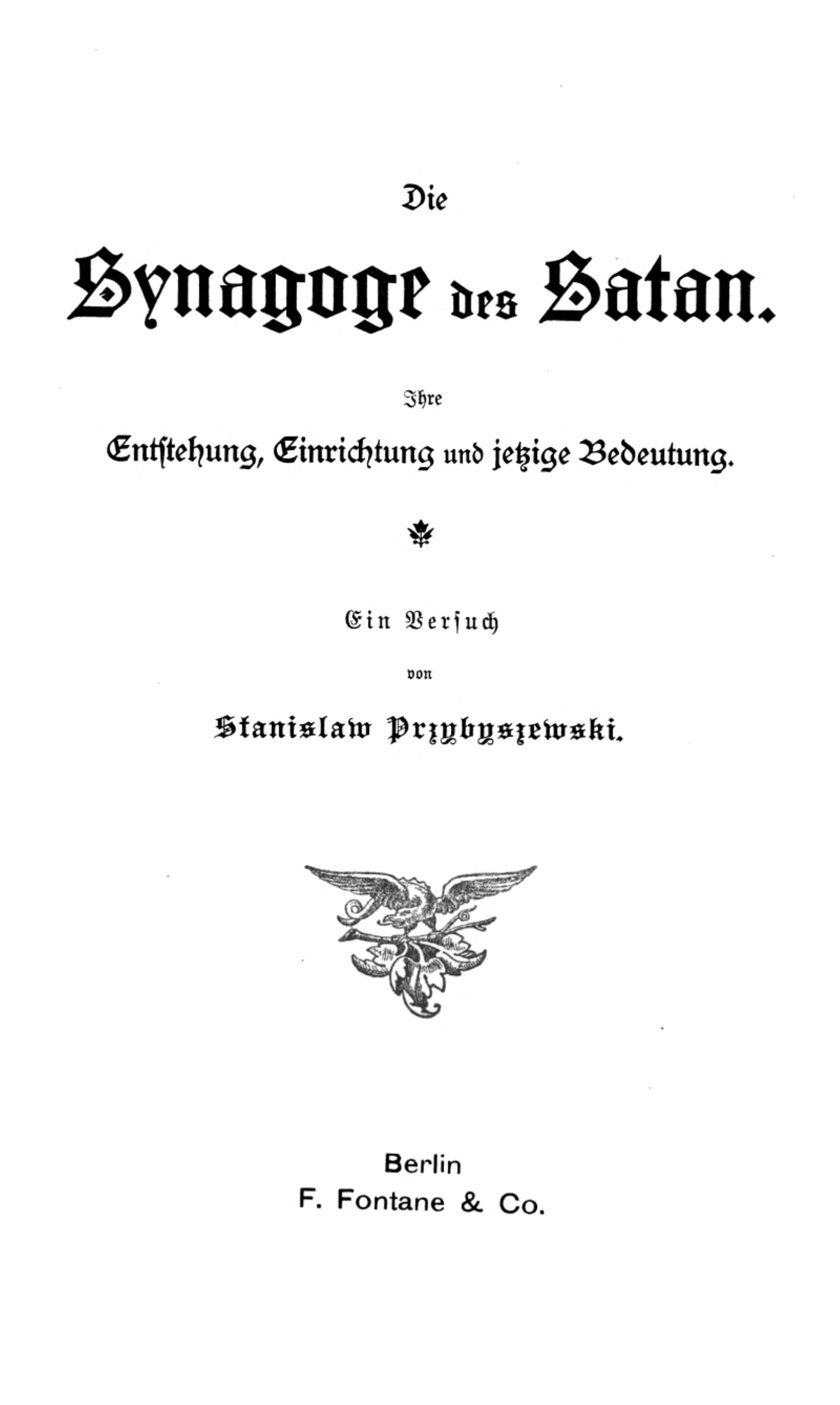
- Title page of first edition, 1897.
- Author: Stanisław Przybyszewski
- Original title: Die Synagoge des Satan
- Language: German
- Subject: Satanism
- Publication date: 1897

The Synagogue of Satan (German: Die Synagoge des Satan) is a book by the Polish author Stanisław Przybyszewski, first published in German in 1897. It is considered one of the foundational works on Satanism, with Przybyszewski being the first author to refer to himself as a "satanist".

== Contents ==
The Synagogue of Satan explores the history of Satanism and its development, delving into the practice of witchcraft, sabbaths, black magic and Black Masses. The title is an allusion to two passages in the Bible, specifically Revelation 2:9 and Revelation 3:9, where the expression appears.

The work is divided into two parts: "The Emergence of the Church of Satan" and "The Worship of the Church of Satan".

== Bibliography ==
- van Luijk, Ruben (2016). Children of Lucifer: The Origins of Modern Religious Satanism. Oxford University Press. ISBN 9780190275105.
- Faxneld, Per; Aagaard Petersen, Jesper (2013). The Devil's party: Satanism in modernity. New York: Oxford University Press. ISBN 9780199779246.
