= Béla Quartet =

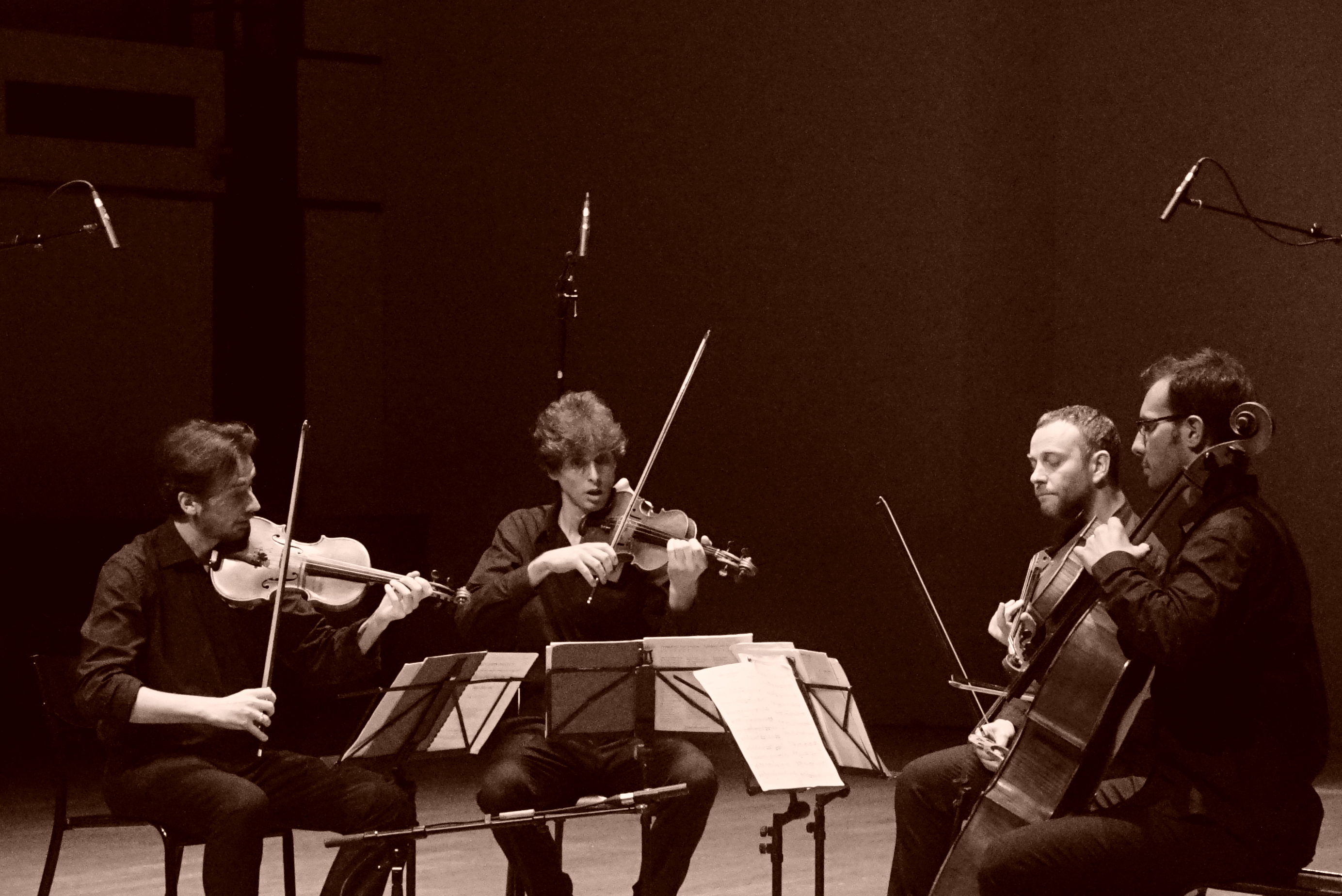
2016

Founded in 2006, the Quatuor Béla is composed of four French musicians, graduates of the Conservatoire de Paris (CNSM): Julien Dieudegard, Frédéric Aurier, Julian Boutin, and Luc Dedreuil.

They were united by their desire both to champion the contemporary repertoire : George Crumb, György Ligeti, Giacinto Scelsi, John Cage, György Kurtág, Helmut Lachenmann, Kaija Saariaho, Béla Bartók, Steve Reich, Raphaël Cendo, Marco Stroppa, and Henri Dutilleux. Several string quartets and other chamber works have been written for the ensemble by Jean-Pierre Drouet, Garth Knox, Karl Naegelen, Alvaro Leòn Martinez, Frédéric Aurier, Daniel D'Adamo, Thierry Blondeau, Jérôme Combier, Philippe Leroux, and Francesco Filidei.

They support all forms of musical creation: mixed media music, improvisation, musical theatre, and commissioned works. They have performed in notable venues of today's music scene, including the Musiques En Scène Biennale, Les Musiques Festival in Marseille, the Why Note Festival, the GRAME, Musique Action, the GMEA, Philharmonie de Paris, Musiques Démesurées, Festival d'Art Lyrique d'Aix en Provence, and Villa Medici.

Their innate desire for artistic exchange has brought them to work with artists of often disparate horizons: Jean François Vrod, Albert Marcœur, Moriba Koïta, Sabîl Duo, the radical jazz trio Jean Louis. These collaborations have given birth to stage shows, an album, concerts, and projects, including Retour sur le Coissard Balbutant, Travaux Pratiques, Machina Mémorialis, Impressions d’Afrique, Jadayel.

Convinced that scholarly contemporary expression deserves to play a vital and even unifying role in all music that is alive and new, they participate in events which are deliberately hybrids – at times acting as organizers, along with such companions of the road, as Denis Charolles, Fantazio, and Sylvain Lemêtre, in which each performer aims to foster a modern, sincere and sensitive relationship with its audience, for example, festival La Belle Ouïe, Carte Blanche Fantazio à Calais, Festival les Nuits d’Eté, La France qui se lève tôt, Carte Blanche au Quatuor Béla à Chambéry, Festival Musiques de Rues, and Africolor.

== Discography ==
- Ligeti : Métamorphoses Nocturnes (CD : AEON - 2013)
- Thierry Blondeau/Daniel D'Adamo : Plier/Déplier (CD: Cuicatl/ la Buissonne - 2013)
- With Sabîl Duo : Jadayel (CD: Ta'mour - 2012)
- With Jean-François Vrod : Retour sur le Coissard Balbutant (CD: Béla Label BL/01 - 2011)
- Albert Marcœur : Travaux Pratiques (CD: Label Frères - 2008)
