= Albert Marcœur =

French composer, singer and songwriter (born 1947)

- Born: 12 December 1947 (age 77); Dijon, France
- Genres: Chanson; Art rock Jazz
- Occupation: Singer-songwriter
- Instrument(s): clarinet, alto saxophone, percussions
- Years active: 1970–present
- Labels: Le Chant du Monde; Label Frères
- Website: marcoeur.com

Albert Marcœur (born 12 December 1947) is a French composer, singer and songwriter. He began his career in the early 1970s. His body of work mixes melodic, rhythmic and sonic experimentations with fancy nursery rhymes, humorous and offbeat lyrics.

== Discography ==
=== Studio albums ===
- 1974: Albert Marcœur
- 1976: Album à colorier
- 1979: Armes & cycles
- 1984: Celui où y'a Joseph
- 1990: Ma vie avec elles
- 1994: Sports et percussions
- 1998: m, a, r et cœur comme cœur
- 2001: Plusieurs cas de figure
- 2005: L apostrophe
- 2008: Travaux pratiques
- 2017: Si Oui, Oui. Sinon Non (with Le Quatuor Béla)

== Soundtracks ==
- 1980: Two Lions in the Sun
- 1981: Douce enquête sur la violence
- 1989: Un tour de manège
- 1991: Un enfoiré et quelques connards
- 1998: Mon placard
- 2006: Premonition
