= Stanisława Przybyszewska =

Polish dramatist (1901 - 1935)

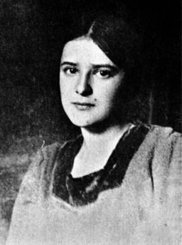
- Stanisława Przybyszewska
- Born: Stanisława Pająkówna; October 1, 1901; Kraków, Austria-Hungary
- Died: August 15, 1935 (aged 33); Free City of Danzig
- Occupations: Playwright, novelist, essayist
- Relatives: Stanisław Przybyszewski (father), Aniela Pająkówna (mother)
- Writing career
- Pen name: Andrée Lynne
- Language: Polish, German
- Subject: French Revolution
- Notable work: The Danton Case

Stanisława Przybyszewska (Polish pronunciation: [staɲiˈswava pʂɨbɨˈʂɛfska]; 1 October 1901 – 15 August 1935) was a Polish dramatist who is mostly known for her plays about the French Revolution. Her 1929 play The Danton Case, which examines the conflict between Maximilien Robespierre and Georges Danton, is considered to be one of the most exemplary works about the Revolution, and was adapted (albeit with significant ideological edits) by Polish filmmaker Andrzej Wajda for his 1983 film Danton.

== Biography ==
Przybyszewska was born Stanisława Pająkówna on 1 October 1901, in Kraków. She was the illegitimate child of the Polish impressionist painter Aniela Pająkówna and the writer Stanisław Przybyszewski, the latter a famous and notoriously dissolute modernist who was one of the founding members of the Young Poland movement.

From 1902 to 1906 she lived with her mother in Lwów (now Lviv, Ukraine); from 1907 to 1916, in Western Europe. As a child she traveled with her mother across Europe (Vienna, Munich, Gries near Bolzano, and Paris).

Having in 1912 lost her mother (who died in Paris of pneumonia), she changed cities, following her guardians. Initially her parents' friends Wacław and Zofia Moraczewski paid for her education, but from 1914 it was her aunt (her mother's sister) Helena Barlińska who took care of the girl.

Between ages ten and fifteen Przybyszewska attended four different schools in three countries: France (Paris), Switzerland (Zürich, 1912-1914), and Austria (Vienna and Oberhollabrunn). In Austria she took violin lessons and began writing poetry and stories which she destroyed, dissatisfied with her own accomplishments.

From 1916 to 1919 she attended the Teachers Institute for Women in Kraków. Kosicka and Gerould wrote, "... she enrolled in the Teachers Institute, a highly regarded training school, which her mother before her had attended. Although she was an outstanding student, Stanisława was sharply critical of both how and what she was taught, and she considered herself essentially self-educated, since her own special interests led her to the exact sciences, above all mathematics and astronomy." As a part of her studies she spent the required year of teaching practice at the elementary school in Nowy Sącz. She passed her Gymnasium examinations cum laude in 1920. In August 1919 she met her father for the first time as an adult. The period of initial fascination with his ideas did not last long, and later in life Przybyszewska was very critical about her father's works.

In 1920, not without Przybyszewski’s involvement, Stanisława moved to Poznań where she established connections with the expressionistic circle of the journal, The Source, and studied music at the conservatory. She also enrolled into a philology course at the Poznań University and for one term followed a diverse curriculum it proposed: the courses of French and English literature (of the nineteenth and the eighteenth centuries respectively), medieval literature, history of philosophy, Spanish, Latin and Greek languages.

In 1922 she moved to Warsaw and found a job as a salesgirl in a Communist bookstore; this employment, in the recent aftermath of the Polish-Soviet War, led to her being arrested for a week in Poznań (her official place of residence) before being released for lack of evidence. Kosicka and Gerould noted that "she took only a theoretical interest in Marxism and remained incapable of becoming directly involved in politics. Stanisława made not a single lasting friendship during her year in Warsaw, but as a result of her incarceration she grew obsessed with the victims of unjust imprisonment and judicial oppression, starting with Robespierre and going up to Sacco and Vanzetti in her own time."

Following her marriage to an artist Jan Panieński (from Poznań circle) Stanisława moved to Gdańsk where Panieński got a job as an art teacher in the Polish Gymnasium (her father had been instrumental in the creation of the school). The couple participated in the activities of a local group Friends of Science and Art. Though not motivated by love, the marriage proved to be a happy one, as they grew attached to each other. It was not, however, very long: in November 1925, while on an art scholarship in Paris, Panieński died from cardiac arrest.

The next ten years of Przybyszewska's life were marked by growing isolation and dedication to her work. She only left Gdańsk on a few occasions, one of them being her father's funeral in 1927. There she met her half-sister Iwi Bennet (Dagny Juel's daughter from Przybyszewski), who became, along with her aunt, one of her closest friends and correspondents. Between March 1928 and 9 March 1929 she wrote The Danton Case and, as Kosicka and Gerould noted, "began to dream of a European career, 'like Conrad', as a way of overcoming her isolation and alienation." She devoted much time to the study of contemporary German literature. From Polish writers she valued Joseph Conrad and Juliusz Kaden-Bandrowski, and considered Stefan Żeromski as having huge talent which didn't develop.

She did not have any stable financial income: the state scholarship that she received in unequal amounts from 1929 to 1933 was not enough to survive, so Przybyszewska depended heavily on the support from Barlińska and Bennet. She lived in poor conditions in the wooden barracks belonging to the Polish Gymnasium. Suffering from poverty and numerous illnesses, she was prescribed increased dosages of morphine by her German doctor Paul Ehmke. Kosicka and Gerould wrote, "During the last eight months of Stanisława's life, nothing was heard from her; all letters, sent and unsent, stopped. She had grown so weak from gradual emaciation that she could no longer type or hold a pen. Her money gone, even the morphine that had sustained her for so long ran out. On 14 August 1935 in her room am Weissen Turm 1, Baracke Nr. 12, Stanisława Przybyszewska died alone, the official cause of death tuberculosis."

== Works and themes ==
Przybyszewska was fixated upon Maximilien Robespierre, and attributed to him, in her writing, extraordinary brilliance and powers of foresight. "I have the calm certainty," she wrote to a friend, "that I understand Robespierre better than anyone whose works are known to me." Przybyszewska depicted Robespierre as having predicted the disastrous rise of capitalism. Robespierre was the central figure in both of her surviving plays, The Danton Case (Sprawa Dantona, 1929), and an earlier unfinished play, Thermidor (1925).

== Reception and legacy ==
British author Hilary Mantel remarks of her that she was "the woman who died of Robespierre." One of Mantel's 2017 Reith Lectures on BBC Radio Four, Silence Grips the Town, delivered in Antwerp, was dedicated to Przybyszewska.

Przybyszewska left a collection of letters written from 1913 to 1934 in several languages to publishers, her friends, and famous European writers like Georges Bernanos, Jean Cocteau, and Thomas Mann, which were published in Gdańsk in the original languages and in Polish in three volumes as Listy (Letters: volume 1, 1978; volume 2, 1983; volume 3, 1985).

The production of The Danton Case by the Royal Shakespeare Company in 1986 was a realization of the playwright's dream that one day she would be performed in London. This first English-language staging was directed by Ron Daniels and adapted by Pam Gems as The Danton Affair.

Jolanta Kajzer has discovered haiku poetry in Przybyszewska's writings.

== Published works ==
- Ostatnie noce ventôse’a (The Last Nights of Ventôse). Kraków: Wydawnictwo Literackie, 1958.
- Dramaty. Edited by Roman Taborski. Gdańsk: Wydawnictwo Morskie, 1975. English translation of The Danton Case and Thermidor was published in 1989 by Northwestern University Press as The Danton Case and Thermidor. Two Plays.
- Listy, vol. 1: Grudzień 1913 – wrzesień 1929. Edited by Tomasz Lewandowski. Gdańsk: Wydawnictwo Morskie, 1978.
- Listy, vol. 2: Październik 1929 – listopad 1934. Edited by Tomasz Lewandowski. Gdańsk: Wydawnictwo Morskie, 1983.
- Listy, vol. 3: Grudzień 1927 – październik 1933. Edited by Tomasz Lewandowski. Gdańsk: Wydawnictwo Morskie, 1985.
- “Kobieca twierdza na lodzie,” in Panek, Sylvia, ed., „Jazgot niewieści” i „męskie kasztele”. Z dziejów sporu o literaturę kobiecą w dwudziestoleciu międzywojennym. Poznań: Wydawnictwo Poznańskiego Towarzystwa Przyjaciół Nauk, 2010, 111-21.
- Cyrograf na własnej skórze i inne opowiadania. Gdańsk: Wydawnictwo słowo/obraz terytoria, 2015.
- Asymptoty. Gdańsk: Wydawnictwo słowo/obraz terytoria, 2018.
- Twórczość Gerarda Gasztowta. Gdańsk: Wydawnictwo słowo/obraz terytoria, 2019.
- Pact with the Devil on My Skin. New York: Contra Mundum Press, 2026. Tr. with an introduction by Søren Gauger

== Books about Stanisława Przybyszewska ==
- Lewandowski, Tomasz. Dramat Intelektu: Biografia literacka Stanisławy Przybyszewskiej. Gdańsk: Wydawnictwo Morskie, 1982.
- Janion, Maria and Stanisław Rosiek, eds. Transgresje, vol. 3: Osoby. Gdańsk: Wydawnictwo Morskie, 1984.
- Kosicka, Jadwiga and Daniel Gerould. A Life of Solitude: Stanisława Przybyszewska, a Biographical Study with Selected Letters. London: Quartet Books, 1986; Evanston: Northwestern University Press, 1989.
- Graczyk, Ewa. Ćma. O Stanisławie Przybyszewskiej. Warszawa: Wydawnictwo Open, 1994.
- Ingdahl, Kazimiera. A Gnostic Tragedy: A Study in Stanislawa Przybyszewska's Aesthetics and Works. Stockholm: Almqvist & Wiksell International, 1997.

== See also ==
- List of Polish people
