= My Other Husband =

- Directed by: Georges Lautner
- Written by: Jean-Loup Dabadie
- Produced by: Alain Poiré
- Starring: Miou-Miou; Roger Hanin; Eddy Mitchell
- Cinematography: Henri Decaë
- Music by: Philippe Sarde
- Production company: Gaumont International
- Distributed by: Gaumont Distribution
- Release date: 21 September 1983
- Running time: 110 minutes
- Country: France
- Language: French

My Other Husband (French: Attention une femme peut en cacher une autre !) is a 1983 French romantic comedy film directed by Georges Lautner.

== Plot ==
Before the events of the film, Alice unintentionally acquires two husbands: an airplane pilot, Philippe, and a teacher, Vincent. She first married Philippe, but they never officially divorced. Years later, she began living with Vincent. She has children with each man and lives parallel lives in two different cities. Eventually, both "husbands" learn of the other's existence—leading to a competition between the two of them for Alice's affections.

== Cast ==
- Miou-Miou as Alice
- Roger Hanin as Philippe
- Eddy Mitchell as Vincent
- Rachid Ferrache as Simon
- Ingrid Lurienne as Pauline
- Dominique Lavanant as Solange
- Charlotte de Turckheim as Cynthia
- François Perrot as Nicolas
