= The Manson File =

1988 book by Nikolas Schreck

- Cover of the first edition
- Editor: Nikolas Schreck
- Language: English
- Subject: Charles Manson
- Publisher: Amok Press
- Publication date: 1988
- Publication place: United States
- Media type: Print
- Pages: 197
- ISBN: 0-941693-04-X
- OCLC: 18022760
- LC Class: HV6248.M2797 M36 1988

The Manson File: The Unexpurgated Charles Manson As Revealed in Letters, Photos, Stories, Songs, Art, Testimony, and Documents is a 1988 book about cult leader Charles Manson published by Amok Press. The book was edited by Nikolas Schreck, though the actual editor may have been the Amok Press founder Adam Parfrey, who was unwilling to publish the book under his own name. The book had five contributing editors: Boyd Rice, Nick Bougas, Jimmi Rocket, John Aes-Nihil, and Jack Stevenson. Another contributor was James Mason. Both Parfrey and Schreck had corresponded with Manson.

The Manson File includes Manson's own original works, including his speeches, art, poems, and lyrics. The book is pro-Manson and presents him as a counterculture figure, engaging in revisionism over his crimes; it describes him as "one of the last true heretics of our time". Among other topics, it analyzes his status as an "occult messiah" and Manson's commercialization in the media. It particularly focuses on fascist or Nazi elements of Manson's philosophy. It was noted for its assemblage of Manson's original creations, quotes, and materials, though was agreed to be pro-Manson; the book resulted in new attention for the neo-Nazi contributor James Mason. It sold well, and was an underground hit for the publisher.

== Background ==
=== Charles Manson ===
Charles Manson was an American cult leader and the leader of the Manson Family, a cult and commune; his followers committed the Manson murders in the late 1960s. Manson did not personally commit the killings, but he, with several of his followers, was tried and sentenced to death for the crimes. As California abolished the death penalty, he instead served life in prison. The case and Manson were widely publicized. Several other books had been written on Manson, among them Manson in His Own Words (which Manson despised), The Family: The Story of Charles Manson's Dune Buggy Attack Battalion, and Helter Skelter. Manson Family members also wrote books of their own in prison.

=== Editors and publication background ===
Adam Parfrey was an American writer, publisher and journalist. Parfrey was then the founder of a publisher of fringe literature, Amok Press. He later founded a successor publisher, Feral House. Parfrey's works often focused on the fringe, transgressive, and provocative, including serial killers and Satanism. He was the publisher of Anton LaVey, the founder of the Church of Satan. Parfrey's Exit magazine also contained several odes to Manson. An Amok Press book on Manson was in the works as of December 1986. Its working title was Manson Apocrypha. A cover draft was a Manson collage by Parfrey. In preparing the book Parfrey contacted his associate James Mason, who had a neo-Nazi group, the Universal Order, based on Manson, for materials for the book. He pitched it to Mason by telling him it was so "Manson’s racial and action-oriented ideas get their exposure".

The book was edited by Nikolas Schreck, a pro-Manson musician with an interest in Nazism and the occult and part of Radio Werewolf. However, according to academic Christopher Mathews, the book was actually edited by Parfrey. According to him, Parfrey was unwilling to publish the book with himself listed as the editor; instead, Schreck was brought on. He was credited as the editor. Schreck was a collector of Manson memorabilia. In 1987, Schreck said of the upcoming book that "this is the first time Manson's letters, his lyrics, his art work and his own philosophy have been published without commentary", and praised Manson as "a true visionary". Both Schreck and Parfrey were part of the "Abraxas Clique" centered around the Abraxas Foundation, and both had been in correspondence with Manson.

The book had five contributing editors: Boyd Rice, another member of the Abraxas Foundation, Nick Bougas, a Manson enthusiast and correspondent, Jimmi Rocket, John Aes-Nihil, and Jack Stevenson. Aes-Nihil had previously directed the 1984 film Manson Family Movies. While the book was being created, Parfrey complained that Manson and Manson Family member Squeaky Fromme had "inexplicably turned against" him and Schreck, but especially Rice, thinking they were "hustling them".

== Contents ==
The book begins with a quotation from Michel Foucault's Madness and Civilization, writing about Marquis de Sade: "The madness of desire, insane murders, the most unreasonable passions—are all wisdom since they are a part of the order of nature. Everything that morality and religion, everything that a clumsy society has stifled in man, revives in the castle of murders. There man is finally attuned to his own nature". A second quote follows it, from Wayne McGuire in the Aquarian Journal, who writes: "The Piscean Age will be crucified on the Cross of Pluto. Prediction: Sometime in the future Charles Manson will metamorphose into a major American folk hero."

The Manson File is organized into 11 main chapters. Following the prologue, the chapters go "Philosophy", "The Testimony", "Music", "Art", "Selected Writings", "Poetry", "The Occult Messiah", "Politics", "Red and Blue", "The Beautiful People", and "The Merchandizing of Manson". Some chapters have subsections. The book begins with a prologue on the "Manson phenomena", where Schreck writes of Manson that "Charles Manson has been transmogrified by the electronic thaumaturgy of mass media into a mythic creation, a larger than life heiratic emblem of evil." It proclaims Manson "one of the last true heretics of our time".

It collects a number of works by Manson. This includes his "lyrics, poems, testimonies, artwork, philosophy, and short stories". Quotes from Manson on a variety of topics, among them the Nazis, Christ, love, his time in prison, and the environment, including from his many interviews and court transcripts, are also included. The book includes for the first time Manson's speech during his trial in its entirety. This version of the transcript is very different from its excerpted printing in the 1975 book Helter Skelter. It also contains an annotated bibliography.

The book includes graphical materials throughout the work, including news photos of Manson, trial documents, and drawings of and from Manson. Nick Bougas, Adam Parley, Raymond Pettibon, and Boyd Rice contributed art. Many contributors were from the Abraxas Clique. Parfrey's own collage, The Revelation of the Sacred Door, which portrays Manson as Jesus was included, as was a drawing from Boyd Rice which shows Manson as an angel is included.

The book is pro-Manson, presents him as a kind of icon of the counterculture, and is revisionist on his crimes. It analyzes him as an "occult messiah", discussing alleged ties to other occult figures and occultist symbolism. The Manson File has a section focusing on fascist or Nazi elements of Manson's philosophy and his ties to such groups. A single piece from the Marxist 2 June Movement is included as well. It includes contributions from and the works of James Mason, who has his own section; included are several of his Manson fliers and excerpts from Siege. The section on commercialization of Manson's image gives criticism of Manson media, like books, comics, and movies.

== Publication history ==
The Manson File was first published in 1988 in New York by Amok Press. It was published in March 1988. It was the third book published by Amok, after 1987's Michael and Parfrey's transgressive collection Apocalypse Culture. The first edition's subtitle was The Unexpurgated Charles Manson As Revealed in Letters, Photos, Stories, Songs, Art, Testimony, and Documents. The book sold well, and was an underground hit for the publisher. Its first printing of 10,000 copies had almost sold out shortly after its publication. The book sold 13,000 copies by July of that year, when it went into its third printing. In 1989, a copy of the book was seized from the homes of the suspects of an alleged attempted kidnapping in Monroe County, Pennsylvania, as part of an alleged satanic ritual.

To promote the book, Schreck went on Maury Povich's television show Hard Copy in early 1988. Schreck also promoted the book on the public-access show Race and Reason, run by white supremacist Tom Metzger. This was his second appearance on the show. On the show, he described The Manson File as a revisionist look at Manson, portraying him as a white supremacist figure and spoke about Schreck's other projects and ideology. He said on the appearance that the Abraxas Foundation was racist. Parfrey said of Manson after the book's publication that he was "a fascinating, intelligent person who obviously has a dark side. But he has another side, too. Sometimes he says things that are philosophically interesting, even legitimate. It's easy to pigeonhole someone and say 'This is a murderer'. But there are plenty of murderers we lionize in history." In another instance he said that "Charlie's got a fevered brain, and he's just gotta scratch it. You never know why these things come. He just zings them out there. He's totally non-linear, and, I think, far more fascinating in what he’s not than what he is."

Schreck went on to create the pro-Manson documentary Charles Manson Superstar the next year. In 1999, Parfrey planned to publish another book on Manson, Charles Manson Scrapbook: Illustrations and Explanations. His successor publisher to Amok Press, Feral House, came out with a new edition of The Manson File in 2011, entitled The Manson File: Charles Manson As Revealed in Letters, Photos, Stories, Songs, Art, Testimony and Documents. The same year, Schreck later published a different book also entitled The Manson File, but subtitled Myth and Reality of an Outlaw Shaman. This is a different book with different contents and was written solely by Schreck, and gives a revisionist history on Manson against the official narrative.

== Reception and analysis ==
The book is a revisionist take on Manson. Scholar Chris Mathews wrote about the book in the context of Satanism and neo-Nazism's connection, writing that The Manson File was "an unabashedly pro-Manson collection of the killer’s writing presented as the authentic voice of a counterculture icon". An academic analysis described it as a revisionist book and one of that books that reawakened the "dichotomy of the antihero" about Manson in 1980s. Academic Jeffrey Kaplan listed it as one of "the more interesting Manson books". Spencer Sunshine noted it as having the first significant reprinting of the works of the neo-Nazi James Mason, later the author of the significant neo-Nazi book Siege. Excerpts from Siege (the magazine the book was based on) being reprinted in the book resulted in a new interest in Mason's work.

The book received reviews from several magazines after its release. Mick Mercer, writing for the music magazine Melody Maker, said of the book that it "demands some understanding, stripping away layer upon layer of unwarranted legendary status, by concentrating on an irritating phenomena called Fact". He argued that the book actually demythologized Manson by revealing his works to be poor and his life story to be "dull, that of an aimless drifter". Thomas Lyttle, reviewing the book in the magazine bOING bOING, said the book "shed[s] considerable light on both a period and a person who will continue to be judged for generations to come", and said it tried to shed light on the reality behind the cliche; he called it "disturbing though captivating [...] certainly none of it is boring", presenting its subject matter "without very much qualification or annotation". He said that unlike earlier works, which presented the Mason Family as opportunistic, the book presented them as having a quasi-religious outlook and complicated ethics system.

Lance Hahn for the magazine Maximum Rocknroll praised it for taking a totally different approach from others about Manson, a sympathetic one. Hahn said it was perhaps the best book for understanding Manson's appeal and the events surrounding him, and praised it as "extremely entertaining" and approachable. Lyttle said the book was good for understanding not just Manson but free will and the appeal of cults. A review in the rightist music magazine The Fifth Path called it "the most complete work up to now on Manson Mania", while Don Bolles for LA Weekly praised it as "a delightful collection of Mansonmania". Mike Rubin writing for The Village Voice said it was "full of homilies to Manson's Aryan racial vision". Charles Krafft described it as a "collection of revisionist apocrypha and obtuse utterances". The annotated bibliography was noted to be "useful (and opinionated)" in a look at resources on Manson, which noted its inclusion of his original works, impact, and life after the murders.

Several commentators praised the book's inclusion of original Manson materials. Mercer said the book was especially valuable and worthwhile for including for the first time Manson's full statement during his trial. Mercer called Manson as revealed in the book "a total gonk", but that the book evidenced that the case against him was weak; he wrote that Manson "certainly deserves a retrial if not his freedom. Then again, he's a tiresome old hippy, so who gives a toss? Let him rot!". Hahn said the book "Inadvertently [...] portrays a simple man who's [sic] politics and ideas were as intellectually simplistic as they were dynamic". Writer Ivan Solotaroff said the book was a "bizarre, disordered œuvre" but also that "(once one learns to accommodate the omnipresent swastikas and invocations of death, evil, Satan, etc.) an immensely compelling one". Solotaroff said the art was absorbing enough to keep the reader interested "until the cosmology of Manson’s world leaps out at you." Lyttle compared Schreck's approach to a novel in form.
