= Bob Larson =

American televangelist (born 1944)

- Bob Larson in 2025
- Born: May 28, 1944 (age 82); Westwood, Los Angeles, California, U.S.
- Occupations: Evangelist, pastor
- Website: boblarson.org

Bobby Emil Larson (born May 28, 1944) is an American radio and television evangelist, and a pastor of Spiritual Freedom Church in Phoenix, Arizona. Larson has authored numerous books critical of rock music and Satanism.

== Life and career ==
Larson was born in Westwood, Los Angeles, California, the son of Viola (née Baum) and Earl Larson. He was raised in McCook, Nebraska.

Larson plays guitar; he has claimed his early experiences as a musician led to his concerns about occult and destructive influences in rock music. He would later incorporate his guitar playing into some of his sermons. In the 1960s, the focus of Larson's preaching centered mainly on the leftist political ideology, sexually suggestive lyrics, Eastern religious mysticism, and anti-social behavior of many of the era's rock musicians.

=== Debates with Satanists ===
During the late 1980s and into the 1990s, Larson repeatedly debated, interviewed, and confronted Satanists, during the period known as the Satanic panic. On two occasions he hosted Nikolas Schreck (a gothic rock musician and lead singer of Radio Werewolf) and Zeena LaVey (once the spokesperson for the Church of Satan and later a priestess in the Temple of Set). During their first encounter the pair defended Satanism, while in 1997, during their second appearance, they defended Setianism. Larson debated the pair, and at times attempted to convert them without success.

=== Talk Back ===
In 1982, Larson launched Talk Back, a two-hour weekday call-in show geared mainly toward teenagers and frequently focused on teen-oriented topics such as role-playing games and rock music. By this time Larson had come to embrace contemporary Christian music, including styles such as heavy metal and rap, and actively promoted the music and artists on his show.

By the late 1980s, in what would come to define his later ministry, Larson was often heard performing exorcisms of callers on the air. The subjects of Satanism and Satanic ritual abuse were frequent topics of discussion. Death metal performer Glen Benton of Deicide became a regular caller, as did Bob Guccione Jr., eldest son of Penthouse founder Bob Guccione and founder of the music magazine Spin. At one point during the 1980s, Guccione Jr. paid Larson to go on tour with American thrash metal band Slayer and write about it.

=== Written works ===
Larson tried his hand at writing fiction. Dead Air (1991) was largely ghost-written by Lori Boespflug and Muriel Olson, according to Karen Stollznow. His later novels Abaddon (1993) and The Senator's Agenda (1995) both linked Satanic ritual abuse to political corruption; the latter was largely written by Larson and his second wife. However, a former vice president of Bob Larson Ministries, Lori Boespflug, said that much of Dead Air, though presented as Larson's work, is allegedly her own. Supporting these claims is a letter from Larson's lawyer that warns Larson of his "potential liability to Lori", anticipating that "the role Lori has played" would lead her to "demand recognition and/or profit participation" in respect to Dead Air and its sequels.

== Exorcism ==
In 2013 Vice magazine taped a video of Larson's visit in several small towns in Ukraine where he performed exorcisms together with three young women: his 18-year-old daughter Brynne Larson and her friends Tess and Savannah Sherkenback (18 and 21 respectively, collectively known as "The Teenage Exorcists"). The friend group had asked Larson to train them in performing exorcisms. The Teenage Exorcists consequently published a reply to Vice Media's video stating that they "question the journalistic integrity of this Vice Media story and are disappointed by how we were falsely portrayed." The group, later renamed the All-American Exorcists, was also profiled by BBC and People, among others.

As of 2014, Larson offered to perform exorcisms over Skype (for a donation of $295). His Skype exorcisms were featured in a segment on the satirical program The Daily Show in 2014, in which he told correspondent Jessica Williams, "Skype is a great technology to stare down the Devil, to go after him and to kick him back to hell." Later in the same segment, however, he indicated that "tweeting an exorcism would be ridiculous."

== Bibliography ==
- Rock & Roll: The Devil's Diversion (Creation House, 1967)
- Hippies, Hindus, and Rock & Roll (Creation House, 1969)
- Rock & the Church (Creation House, 1971)
- The Day Music Died (Creation House, 1972) ISBN 0-88419-030-7
- Hell on Earth (Creation House, 1974) ISBN 0-88419-072-2
- Babylon Reborn (Creation House, 1976) ISBN 0-88419-006-4
- Rock, Practical Help for Those Who Listen to the Words and Don't Like What They Hear (Tyndale, 1980) ISBN 0-8423-5685-1
- Larson's Book of Cults (Tyndale, 1982) ISBN 0-8423-2104-7
- Larson's Book of Family Issues (Tyndale, 1986) ISBN 0-8423-2459-3
- Strange Cults in America (Tyndale, 1986) ISBN 0-8423-6675-X
- Larson's Book of Rock (Tyndale, 1987) ISBN 0-8423-5687-8
- Your Kids and Rock (Tyndale, 1988) ISBN 0-8423-8611-4
- Satanism: the Seduction of America's Youth (Lightning Source, 1989) ISBN 0-8407-3034-9
- Straight Answers on the New Age (Thomas Nelson, 1989) ISBN 0-8407-3032-2
- Tough Talk About Tough Issues (Tyndale, 1989) ISBN 0-8423-7297-0
- Larson's New Book of Cults (Tyndale, 1989) ISBN 0-8423-2860-2
- Dead Air: A Novel (Thomas Nelson, 1991) ISBN 0-8407-7638-1
- Abaddon: A Novel (Thomas Nelson, 1993) ISBN 0-8407-7796-5
- The Senator's Agenda (Thomas Nelson, 1995) ISBN 0-7852-7879-6
- In the Name of Satan: How the Forces of Evil Work and What You Can Do to Defeat Them (Thomas Nelson, 1996) ISBN 0-7852-7881-8
- UFO's and the Alien Agenda (Thomas Nelson, 1997) ISBN 0-7852-7182-1
- Extreme Evil: Kids Killing Kids (Nelson Reference, 1999) ISBN 0-7852-6870-7
- Larson's Book of Spiritual Warfare (Nelson, 1999) ISBN 0-7852-6985-1
- Shock Talk: The Exorcist Files (WestBow, 2001) ISBN 0-7852-7009-4

== See also ==
- Spiritual warfare
