= Sheila Pepe =

Artist

Sheila Pepe (born Morristown, New Jersey, 1959) is an artist and educator living and working in Brooklyn, New York. She is a prominent figure as a lesbian cross-disciplinary artist, whose work employs conceptualism, surrealism, and craft to address feminist and class issues. Her most notable work is characterized as site-specific installations of web-like structure crocheted from domestic and industrial material, although she works with sculpture and drawing as well. She has shown in museums and art galleries throughout the United States.

Pepe's installations are made linear elements such as string, rope, shoelaces, and industrial rubber bands. They are the result of a process she has called "improvisational crochet."

As a lesbian feminist (and one-time lesbian separatist in the 1980s), Pepe emphasizes that her work is influenced by the work of women before her. She cites Judy Chicago's The Dinner Party and Eva Hesse's Hang Up as formative influences on her practice.

== Education ==
Pepe attended Bayley-Ellard High School in Madison, New Jersey, and received her BA in 1981 at Albertus Magnus College in New Haven, CT, followed shortly by a BFA in ceramics at Massachusetts School of Art, Boston, in 1983. She studied blacksmithing at the Haystack Mountain School of Crafts, Deer Isle, Maine, in 1984. In 1994 she received a fellowship to attend the Skowhegan School of Painting and Sculpture, Skowhegan, Maine, completed her MFA at the School of the Museum of Fine Arts, Boston, in 1995.

== Life and work ==
While earning her BFA, she participated in the Boston feminist and lesbian communities, while working at the restaurant Beetle's Lunch. In 1983, she moved to rural Western Massachusetts and was involved with folk artists and feminist activists such as Diana Davies and Kathleen Van Deurs. In 1985, she began working as a gallery guard at Smith College Museum of Art in Northampton. In 1986 she was awarded a position as the National Endowment for the Arts Curatorial Intern and continued working there as a preparer's assistant, under David Dempsey, until 1989.

Pepe made little work during the mid-1980s, but in 1988 while working with art at Smith College, she began to sew dolls, which were shown and sold in Northampton. In 1992, she began her MFA work at the School of the Museum of Fine Arts, Boston, exploring video, performance, and sculpture comprising a highly feminist practice. During this time, an ongoing project called the "Doppelganger Series" was begun. This prompted her first solo show was at 88 Room in the Allston Mall in 1994. Work From the Doppelganger Series consisted of constructions or assemblages whose shadows cast on the wall serve as prompts for wall drawings. This process draws from the Surrealist automatic drawing exercise, exquisite corpse.

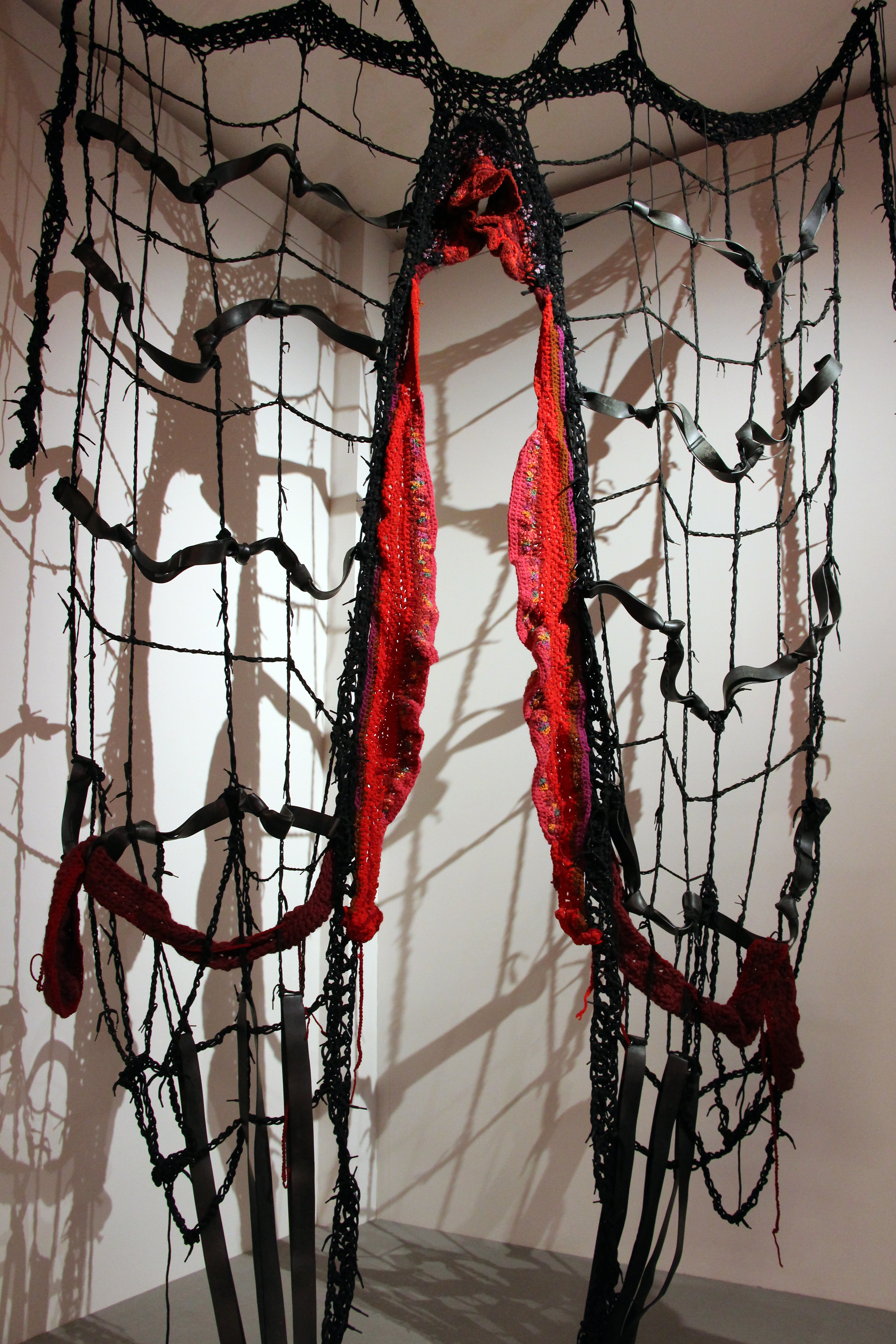
"Mr. Slit" (2007) on display at Monnaie de Paris.

Pepe's break into the art world began with inclusion into a 1996 group exhibition of Boston area artists at Rose Art Museum and in "Gothic: Transmutations of Horror in Late 20th Century Art" at the Institute of Contemporary Art, Boston in 1997. Her more recent work can be exemplified by her installation "Mind the Gap," 2005, at the University of Massachusetts Amherst. "Mind the Gap" was a site-specific sculptural work responding to the architecture of the gallery where shoelaces and nautical toe-line were intertwined and webbed throughout the space. This work instigated a dialogue between domestic and industrial materials and responded to a 1982 installation "Boa" by Judy Pfaff in the same place. Her 2007 piece, Mr. Slit, plays with binary notions of gender in its depiction of a giant vagina made from crocheted shoelaces, rubber, and hardware scraps. In 2014, her piece Put Me Down Gently was included in the show Fiber: Sculpture 1960-Present at the Institute of Contemporary Art, Boston.

She has won awards including the School of the Museum of Fine Arts Traveling Scholarship, 1998, and the Louis Comfort Tiffany Foundation award, 2001. She has taught art in many school throughout Massachusetts, New York, and Virginia since 1985. She currently holds an administrative position at Pratt Institute in Brooklyn as the acting assistant dean of the school of fine arts. Her works are held in public collections including the Fogg Art Museum of Harvard University and Goldman Sachs.

Pepe is one of 120 artists to be featured in the Metropolitan Museum's 2016 series "The Artist Project," a series of video essays in six seasons about works or installations at the Met museum.

In 2023, Pepe created her first outdoor exhibition, "My Neighbor’s Garden," which opened on June 26 in Madison Square Park in New York.

In 2024 Pepe was awarded the Rome Prize in Visual Art at the American Academy in Rome.
