= Abraxas Foundation =

Counterculture collective

- Abraxas Foundation symbol
- Formation: 1987
- Founder: Boyd Rice
- Dissolved: 1992
- Headquarters: San Francisco, California, U.S.
- Main organ: Wake

The Abraxas Foundation was a San Francisco-based group active in the 1980s, founded by the American industrial musician Boyd Rice in 1987. Other members of the group included the musicians Nikolas Schreck and Michael J. Moynihan, and the publisher Adam Parfrey. Descriptions of what the Abraxas Foundation was and what it actually did vary, even among its members.

The group would frequently publish and promote each other, and were involved with a wide range of other transgressive figures. The Abraxas Foundation was involved in orchestrating the high-profile 8/8/88 Rally in San Francisco, which brought together Satanist and neo-Nazi elements. They operated a record label and the periodical Wake, edited by Boyd Rice for its single issue. The group split with Schreck in 1990, and it was defunct by 1992.

Abraxas Foundation materials focused on a variety of taboo topics, including Satanism, social Darwinism, serial killers and occultist Nazism, but also gnosticism and Norse mythology. They were particularly interested in the cult leader Charles Manson. They had ties to several white supremacists, as well as the Church of Satan. They were involved in popularizing the works of the neo-Nazi James Mason and publishing his book Siege.

== Profile ==
Descriptions of what the Abraxas Foundation was and what it actually did vary, even among its members; Founder Boyd Rice described it as an "occult-fascist think tank". Contrarily, member Michael J. Moynihan described Abraxas as a "loose-knit thing" that was not an actual organization, but rather a "clearing-house for ideas". Nikolas Schreck called it "sort of a Thule Society for the '90s." Journalist Kevin Coogan described them as a collective of "industrial culture" fans, and an "épater les bourgeois" movement, while scholar Chris Mathews described the clique as a "loose network of friends and social agitators".

Several writers have called the group the Abraxas Clique, while Kevin Coogan called it the "Abraxas network". This is distinguished from the Abraxas Foundation proper. Sunshine, taking the term from Chris Mathews, used "Abraxas Clique" to refer to the works of the four members after the foundation had technically ceased to exist, or things they worked on that were not labeled with the group. Mathews also uses the alternative name Feral House Clique, after Parfrey's publisher Feral House. Sunshine argued there was a wider "Abraxas Circle" made up of the four members' affiliates, involving a wide range of countercultural and transgressive figures, with both an inner and outer circle.

The Abraxas Foundation was named for Abraxas, a gnostic god who represented the union of opposites, especially that of good and evil. The name came from Rice. Rice described Abraxas as embodying "a pre-christian world view [...] in which good and evil are reconciled and harnessed in the service of evolutionary imperative", while Schreck said contrarily that the god was "a symbol of the eternal Now, a state of mind that exists beyond the false dichotomies of light and darkness, good and evil, right and wrong".

== History and activities ==
Boyd Rice (right), the founder of the Abraxas Foundation, protesting for Charles Manson's freedom in 1989

The Abraxas Foundation was founded in 1987 in San Francisco by the American industrial musician Boyd Rice. Rice worked on the musical project NON and was a member of the American Front and the Church of Satan. Nikolas Schreck, who claimed he was the co-founder, was also a member. The organization was based in San Francisco. Chris Mathews said that Holocaust denier Keith Stimely was actually the cofounder.

Schreck was an associate and advocate of the cult leader Charles Manson, and head of the band Radio Werewolf. Another member was Adam Parfrey, the cofounder of Exit magazine and later Amok Press. In 1989, he founded the publisher Feral House. Musician and journalist Michael J. Moynihan was also later involved, having joined the group by March 1989. Writer Kevin Coogan stated that Schreck's then-girlfriend, Zeena LaVey, the daughter of Church of Satan founder Anton LaVey, was also involved in Abraxas, while Chris Mathews said she worked "in conjunction" with Abraxas. Spencer Sunshine did not consider her a member, writing the four members of Abraxas were Rice, Parfrey, Schreck, and Moynihan.

Members of the clique often published and promoted one another and their works. The Foundation was promoted by Schreck's band Radio Werewolf, in Aryan Warrior, the magazine of the neo-Nazi group American Front, and in the Church of Satan's magazine, The Black Flame. They also ran a record label which released several recordings, one of which was by Rice's NON. They worked with George Petros's Seconds magazine; the music magazine The Fifth Path was somewhat similar in orientation to the Abraxas Foundation.

Several members of the wider Abraxas Circle were involved in the creation of The Manson File, a book celebrating Charles Manson. It was edited by Schreck and published by Parfrey's Amok Press in 1988.

=== 8/8/88 ===
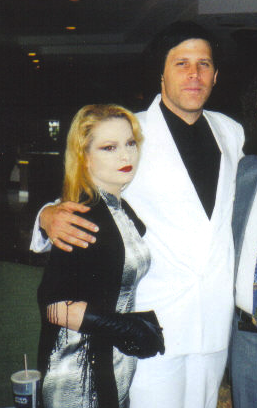
Nikolas Schreck, one of the members of the group, with his then-wife Zeena Schreck in 1999

The Abraxas Foundation and its members helped stage the 8/8/88 Rally, a high-profile satanist rally in San Francisco at the Strand Theater, held on August 8, 1988. This date was a reference to three things: the anniversary of Sharon Tate's murder by the Manson Family, an alleged ritual by Anton LaVey 19 years earlier, and 88, a Nazi reference for Adolf Hitler. Among those involved were Rice, Parfrey, Zeena LaVey, Radio Werewolf, several neo-Nazis, the American Front, and the Church of Satan. Zeena read from The Satanic Bible, written by her father; the crowd chanted "Hail Satan." The rally was noted for its explicitly neo-Nazi elements; a photo from the event displayed Zeena, Schreck, Rice, and the neo-Nazi activist Bob Heick giving a Nazi salute. After the rally was over Rice and Parfrey were interviewed in front of Nazi flags.

Writer Jesper Aagard Petersen called the rally "nominally a concert with Boyd Rice's NON and a screening of a Charlie Manson movie called The Other Side of Madness" that "was a cross between a political rally and performance art that celebrated the death of the 1960s in full fascist style". Writer Gavin Baddeley described 8/88/88 as "the defining moment in 1980s satanism", and it was, according to Sunshine, the Abraxas Foundation's "greatest moment of relevance". Rice later called the rally a disappointment and accused Schreck of having ruined it.

=== Moynihan joins Abraxas ===
Moynihan joined the group in March 1989. With his admission, Abrxaxas iublished a statement along the lines of a poem or manifesto that espoused the beliefs of Abraxas; it ended "Long live death!" and hailed destruction. Moynihan worked on the Abraxas Foundation's "propaganda" with Rice.

The revised edition of Parfrey's transgressive anthology Apocalypse Culture contained contributions from the group. Members of the Abraxas Foundation were involved in popularizing and spreading the works of James Mason, a neo-Nazi who shared their fascination with Charles Manson. Mason also contributed to The Manson File and Parfrey's Exit magazine. In 1992, Moynihan published Mason's book Siege, a collection of his writings. The book lauds Hitler, Manson, and other mass murderers and promotes lone wolf terrorism. Mason was closely affiliated with the members of Abraxas for many years, and initially believed that the Abraxas Foundation shared his views. He later changed his mind and said they were not true National Socialists and that Rice, Moynihan and Parfrey had adhered to incorrect ideas.

Holocaust denier Keith Stimely, formerly of the Holocaust denial group the Institute for Historical Review, became affiliated with the group; they shared his interest in Yockey. Stimely wrote a Halloween 1991 cover story for the newspaper Willamette Week, an alt-weekly based in Portland, Oregon, where he profiled a local Satanist, Diabolos Rex, also affiliated with the Abraxas Foundation; in 1992, Stimely performed as a pianist during a performance from Rex, Moynihan, and Rice.

=== Breakup with Schreck and Wake ===
In 1990, the Foundation began conflicting with Schreck. Rice blamed him for the 8/8/88 Rally being a failure, and Moynihan accused Schreck of lying about many things and being secretly Jewish. Schreck then broke with the group. In 1991, Rice and Moynihan planned to work on an Abraxas Foundation public-access television show, but had a falling out before this occurred.

The Abraxas Foundation operated the newspaper Wake (stylized in all caps). Its single issue released in 1992. Stimely assisted in the creation of the periodical. The periodical took several years to release. While Moynihan had worked on it since 1989, Rice was listed as the only editor credited when it was released. The only two people credited on its editorial page are Rice, listed as editor, and Stimely, listed as "production consultant". Mason had been invited to work on it but this did not end up happening. Rice described it as "the world's first newspaper dedicated to Barbarism and Social Darwinism"; the main essay of the first issue was entitled "Nature's Eternal Fascism". Moynihan expressed his dissatisfaction with the final product.

== Beliefs and focus ==
The Abraxas Foundation promoted Satanism and social Darwinism, as well as misanthropy. They were occultists, and expressed a general interest in spiritual ideas of gnosticism. The Abraxas Foundation espoused anti-democracy, and at times misogynistic sentiments. Abraxas Foundation members rejected the political left-wing for its egalitarianism, though shared their anti-capitalism to some extent.

The group's materials focused on a variety of taboo topics, including serial killers and occultist Nazism. They were also interested in Norse mythology. Several members of the group were fascinated by and praised the cult leader Charles Manson, as well as Anton LaVey and the neo-Nazi James Mason. The Abraxas Foundation grew out of the underground scene. and had close ties to and were influenced by the Church of Satan. All four members were to some degree personally involved with Anton LaVey, the founder of the Church of Satan. Schreck said that most humans had rejected the "law of the strong", what he said was the natural order of things, which would lead to catastrophe; hence, the Abraxas Foundation's supposed goal was to eliminate the people they considered weak and undesirable, leaving only the elite. On more than one occasion members of the Foundation called for eliminating large amounts of humanity.

They were influenced by the fascist writers Francis Parker Yockey, Alfred Rosenberg, and Savitri Devi, and frequently utilized Nazi imagery, though maintained ambiguity over whether they were white supremacists or neo-Nazis. Their insignia was a Wolfsangel patch. Rice was, at the time of his involvement, interested in pagan aspects of Adolf Hitler and National Socialist ideas, saying Hitler was "an occultist trying to bring about a pagan revival" against the "Judeo-Christian ethic", and that what Hitler had done in "bringing that to an end" was "what we're doing today". He later denied being a fascist or a Nazi and claimed it was all for aesthetics. Schreck, in contrast, did at one time describe the group as explicitly racist, and their associate Keith Stimely described them as neo-Nazis. The white supremacist Tom Metzger identified the Abraxas Foundation as part of the racist movement.

== Legacy ==
The foundation ceased to exist after Wake's publication in 1992. The radical views of the former members largely diminished with time. According to scholar Chris Mathews, the actions of the "Abraxas Clique" served to "further radicalize satanism" with their shared obsessions. One analysis described Rice's affiliation with the group as evidence that he "demonstrated a fascination with Social Darwinism and fascism that was neither ironic nor part of an interrogation machine". Jesper Aa. Petersen wrote that, 20 years in retrospect, their actions seemed far more "brutal and uncompromising" than it may have seemed at the time.

Kevin Coogan wrote the first analysis of the group and their wider circle in the music magazine Hit List in 1999, in an article entitled "How 'Black' is Black Metal?" Writer Spencer Sunshine noted their legacy in promoting the works of Mason and his book Siege. Sunshine argued the 2010s alt-right movement was in part a legacy of the Abraxas Clique and their vision for a "reactionary cultural movement".
