= Kady Van Deurs =

American lesbian activist and writer (1928–2003)

Kathleen Van Deurs
- Born: 1928; Pensacola, Florida, U.S.
- Died: 2003 (aged 74–75)
- Other name: Kady
- Occupations: Lesbian activist, artist, writer
- Notable work: The Notebooks That Emma Gave Me: The Autobiography of a Lesbian (1978), Panhandling Papers (1989)
- Parents: Admiral George Van Deurs (father); Ann Van Deurs (mother)

Kady (Kathleen) Van Deurs (1928–2003) was a lesbian activist, artist, and writer. She published two books of her writing, titled, The Notebooks That Emma Gave Me: The Autobiography of a Lesbian (1978) and Panhandling Papers (1989).

== Early life ==
Kady Van Deurs, original name Kathleen, was born in Pensacola, Florida in 1927 to Admiral George Van Deurs, World War II veteran, and Ann Van Deurs. Her father associated her lesbianism with communism and threw her out of the house. She moved to New York City and worked odd-jobs. She struggled with her mental health and after having suicidal thoughts she signed herself into a mental institution. After being threatened with shock therapy, she left, with the help of her father, and went instead to a Johns Hopkins University psychiatrist who drugged her in an attempt to cure her lesbianism.

== Career ==
In 1961, Kady Van Deurs moved into an abandoned storefront on West 10th street in Greenwich Village and started the Workshop of the Children which was a toy and craft-making space for children. The workshop was widely successful over the first couple of years and helped over 500 children in the first few years. It was however eventually pushed out by disgruntled neighbors and failed to find a permanent building.

She joined the Peace Corps and worked in Panama from 1965 to 1969.

In 1971, Kady Van Deurs, encouraged by her friend and fellow activist, Diana Davies (photographer) attended the first ever "Gay Rights March on Albany" which kickstarted her lesbian activism. In the 1970s and 1980s, Van Deurs was involved with the Gay liberation movement, anti-Vietnam war movement, and Women's liberation movement. She worked and corresponded with Andrea Dworkin, Barbara Deming, Marsha P. Johnson, Diana Davies and Sheila Pepe. She was a member of the Gay Liberation Front, Gay Activists Alliance, and Lesbian Feminist Liberation.

In her work as an activist, Van Deurs was arrested and served time for protesting including at the Seneca Women's Encampment for a Future of Peace and Justice in 1983.

== Art ==
Kady van Duers was a jewelry maker and silversmith. She designed jewelry with her friend Diana Davies in their studio at 324 Atlantic Avenue in Brooklyn, New York. She exhibited her work in Massachusetts when she lived there later in life.

== Published work ==
Kady van Duers published The Notebooks That Emma Gave Me: The Autobiography of a Lesbian in 1978. Her memoirs chronicle her early life, her lesbianism, her struggles in poverty, and her art. Cindy Stein, of Gay Community News (Boston), described her autobiography stating that "Kady taught me how important each one of our lives, as lesbians, as women, is to the rest of us." Anita Leibowitz Page, of Feminist Review, wrote "The autobiography of this lesbian-feminist-anarchist-letter writer and journal keeper, ex-cab driver and ex-Quaker, silversmith, friend of racoons and axe-maker to the Queen—is funny and sad and utterly compelling in its energy and fullness."

She later published Panhandling Papers in 1989 which was a compilation of her writing on her activism throughout the late seventies and eighties.

== Later life ==
In her later life, she moved to Greenfield, Massachusetts and continued working on her art. She died in 2003.
