= Manson Family Movies =

1984 film by John Aes-Nihil

- Cover of the DVD release
- Directed by: John Aes-Nihil
- Written by: John Aes-Nihil
- Produced by: John Aes-Nihil
- Production company: Aes-Nihil Productions
- Release date: 1984
- Running time: 88 minutes
- Country: United States

Manson Family Movies (also known as simply Family Movies or Manson Home) is a 1984 American horror film directed, produced, and written by John Aes-Nihil. It is based on the rumor that the Manson Family recorded some of their crimes, and attempts to recreate what actual Manson Family home movies would have looked like. Aes-Nihil began making the film in 1974, and filming lasted until 1979.

Manson Family Movies had a very low budget–most of the cast were personal friends of the director–and it was released direct-to-video in 1984. The film has no dialogue and the audio was added in post, with an assemblage of popular music and audio from the Manson Family. The film received mixed reviews but saw some success as a cult film. It has been identified as one of the earliest found footage horror films.

== Synopsis ==
Manson Family Movies is made up of several scenes that attempts to recreate what the home videos of the Manson Family might have looked like. Filmed to suggest it is the actual home movies, it is presented in an episodic fashion. There is no dialogue, though on occasion, title cards add additional text information and context. It depicts Manson Family members socializing at Spahn Ranch, and the murders at Cielo Drive. Manson Family Movies ends with Manson being crucified. The film's credits are written on a wall and a fridge with blood.

== Cast ==
- Rick the Precious Dove as Charlie
- John Aes-Nihil as Tex
- Katie Lazarus as Sadie Mae Glutz / Voyteck
- Knarly Dana as Sadie Mae Glutz
- Krista Meth as Sadie Mae Glutz
- Mr. Jacquetta as Patricia
- Judy as Linda / Abigail / Leno (as Luscious)
- Ms. Mule as Mother Mary
- Danny as Mother Mary
- Lori as Mother Mary
- Porn Michael as Bobby
- Miss Sheila Star as Leslie / Sharon (as Miss Star)

== Production ==
After the Manson murders in 1969, where, at Charles Manson's direction, several people were killed by his followers (the "Manson Family"), the group became notorious and inspired numerous works and pieces of media. There circulated rumors that the Manson family members had filmed rituals and murders on video using stolen camera equipment, later burying the tapes in the desert; this was never established, but the rumor remained. Manson Family Movies was based on these rumors, and attempted to recreate the films as they may have looked. The box stated: "The Manson Family is rumored to have filmed their activities. This is what those films, The Family movies, may have looked like."

The film was directed, produced, and written by John Aes-Nihil, a collector of Manson memorabilia. He has voiced his belief that Manson was innocent and that the blame for the murders lies on Tex Watson. He later co-edited the pro-Manson book The Manson File. The film was partially inspired by John Waters's 1972 film Pink Flamingos; after seeing that film, Aes-Nihil decided that Waters had made the film he wanted to make, so instead he decided to make a film about the Manson murders. He began making the film in 1974, and filming lasted until 1979. He said that as of 1994 it was "still being changed from time to time".

Manson Family Movies was produced on a very low budget, and was filmed with 8 mm film stock. Aes-Nihil acquired the camera used in the film for five dollars at a garage sale. Most of the cast were his personal friends. It was shot without a script and Aes-Nihil had his cast improvise as they went along. It was distributed and produced by Aes-Nihil's company, Aes-Nihil Productions, based in Reseda, Los Angeles. Scenes were shot on location at many of the actual crime scenes. This included the La Bianca house, the Cielo Drive house, and the Spahn and Barker ranches. Its executive producer was credited as "Michael H.", "screams" were credited to King Mama, titles are credited to Black Sapphire, and "original murder music" is credited to Beyond Joy & Evil.

The movie has no diagetic sound. In post, audio recordings of Manson Family members, Charles Manson himself, and various musical pierces were added. Several of these are illegally used tracks from a number of 1960s outfits, including The Beatles and Pink Floyd, while others are unreleased tracks from the Manson Family and dialogue from Manson interviews. Later versions of the film have a different soundtrack, which was altered for copyright reasons (largely removing the Beatles and Pink Floyd songs), with more synth and rock focus.

It was released direct to video in 1984. It was later released on DVD in 2005 by Cult Epics. The DVD contained additional material, including outtakes, crime and death photos, an interview with Manson, and a director's commentary. On video the film had a 70 minute runtime, while on DVD it was 88 minutes. The Dark Side Digital wrote in 2013 that the film "was never properly released", probably due to the legal issues surrounding the soundtrack. In 1987, Aes-Nihil described the film as "basically a joke". He claimed that real Manson family member Sandra Good took "great offense" to the film in its portrayal of her as a drug user; he said that this completely missed the point.

== Reception and analysis ==
Manson Family Movies has been considered an early example of a found footage film, one of only a few in the genre between the first widely regarded found footage film, Cannibal Holocaust (1980) and The Blair Witch Project in 1999. Journalist Michael Ordoña identified it as one of only 8 found footage horror films made in this period. It has also been classed as a mondo film. Mark Kermode considered it alongside other less professional Manson-inspired projects of the 1970s and 1980s, writing that they "remain little seen and even less respected".

A 2016 analysis in the book Snuff: Real Death and Screen Media considered Manson Family Movies alongside the 1989 film Judgement Day Theater: The Book of Manson, which also reenacted aspects of the Manson murders, writing that "neither film depicts snuff activity, but both adopt stylistic modes evoking home movies as if in consolation for the notoriously absent Family films." They noted that the film was well-sourced in its depictions of the events, and that its amateurism "allows it to represent the murders through slapdash, vérité methods" with aspects that were "akin to silent cinema". Bill Ogersby noted it alongside that film, writing that both explore a "blurring of Manson myth and reality". Writer Christian Fuchs wrote in 2002 that it was the product of "a group of inveterate Manson fans delivering a tribute to their idol." Scholar Jean Murley considered Manson Family Movies "arty-weird", "nearly unwatchable" as a film but "exquisite" as a piece of Manson Family fetishism.

Brutarian called Manson Family Movies "deranged", but also a "loving tribute" with a "chilling air of reality". Nick Louras, writing for the horror magazine Penny Blood, described it as a "film of undeniable power", "shocking, disjointed, and obsessively attentive to detail". He wrote that it "watches more like a theatric ritual, a magical working, than traditional cinema". He considered it to be "inaccessibly fetishistic" for casual viewers, but a must see for fans of true crime or experimental films. Screen Rant described it as "more of a curio than a satisfying feature", while The Dark Side Digital was critical, writing in 2013 that if the real Manson movies looked as bad as this film, "they should stay buried". Film Threat wrote in 1988 that it was "nothing more than poorly done super 8 that is almost unwatchable". Writer Ian Cooper found its low technical quality to be a benefit to what the film was going for, making it seem more authentic; he found it to contain an unusual amount of detail. He considered it to be interesting and "oddly effective", "without being good in anything like a conventional sense".

Manson Family Movies saw some success among fringe audiences and had some popularity as a cult film; Don Bolles described it as "the definitive cult film, a virulent marriage of low-tech and poor taste" with a "fastidious attention to both historic and forensic detail". LA Weekly said in 2009 that the film was a "gory cult classic". The movie was a favorite of American filmmaker John Waters, who called it "a primitive, obsessional, fetishistic tribute to mayhem, murder and madness. Enough to apall even the most jaded VCR." Genesis P-Orridge also considered the film a favorite.
