= Jack Stevenson =

American author and film showman (born 1955)

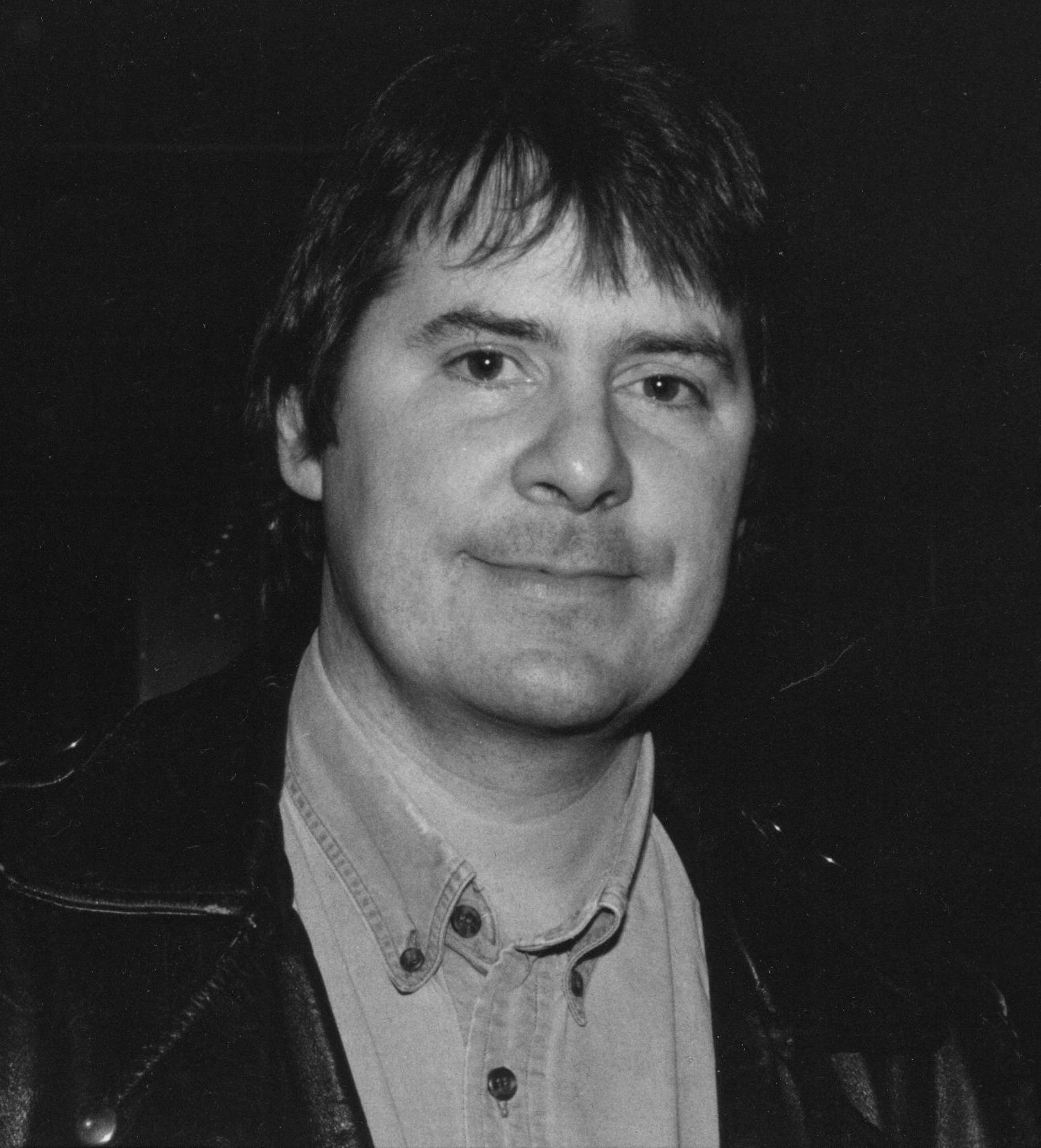
- Born: Wellsville, New York, U.S.
- Occupations: Author, film showman

Jack Stevenson is an American author, film showman, and cinema proprietor. He is based in Kalundborg, Denmark.

== Career ==
Stevenson's books illuminate aspects of cinema and history that have been largely neglected by mainstream media. Also, of value to future historians, are his published interviews of Underground figures that he did starting in the early eighties.

Stevenson's most recent book is The Haunted North (Horror Stories from Viking Country), a collection of ten horror stories drawn from the extremes of Scandinavian history and culture, and spans the period from the Dark Ages to World War II. The through line of the book is witchcraft.

Stevenson's book Hotrod Billy & his Friends is his first work of fiction. About it, Robert Crumb wrote "Well written, unaffected and ringing with authenticity".

== Author ==
Stevenson's earliest published writing was in his magazine The Living Color, published in Los Angeles in 1982. The Living Color featured Stevenson's interviews, most notably of John Waters, poems he received in the mail from Charles Bukowski, his own short fiction, and works by Jim Morton and William Sikorsky. A review didn't mention the Waters interview, barely mentioned Bukowski, but did say "Otherwise, there's good film coverage, especially on Godfather of Gore Herschell Gordon Lewis, a punchy sports column and a fascist advice page. A lot, really, for free." In Boston Stevenson's more ambitious and bigger magazine, Pandemonium, followed The Living Color. The first issue came out in 1986. Leading up to it, Stevenson had exchanged letters with a wide range of underground and outlaw individuals. Pandemonium # 1 featured articles, correspondence, and interviews with Charles Bukowski, William S. Burroughs, Al Goldstein, and John Waters. Pandemonium #2 was more ambitious, and contained interviews and articles with, Divine, Mary Woronov, Cookie Mueller, Rosa von Praunheim and many others. The third and final issue of Pandemonium, a "Freaks, Magicians & Movie Stars Special Edition" was published in 1989. Again improved, the issue featured articles and interviews, including Mary Vivian Pearce, Kenneth Anger, George Kuchar, and Johnny Eck. Film Threat Magazine published his interview with George Kuchar in 1988.

Stevenson's first book, Desperate Visions: Camp America (1996), focused on the films of John Waters and the Kuchar Brothers. It had its launch party at the Lighthouse Cinema, in New York on June 12, 1996, kicking off the first ever major retrospective of the films of George and Mike Kuchar. Stevenson flew in from Denmark for the event.

Stevenson followed that up with two books published in 2000, "Addicted: The Myth & Menace of Drugs in Film" and "Fleshpot: Cinema's Myth Makers & Taboo Breakers". His book Dogme Uncut: Lars von Trier, Thomas Vinterberg, and the Gang That Took on Hollywood, was published in 2003, to excellent reviews. Publishers Weekly wrote: "Stevenson presents an uncluttered and jargon-free assessment of an important movement in independent film, making this an excellent choice for foreign film buffs and aficionados." Film Comment wrote "[Stevenson's] overview of Danish society and culture, as well as the country's important filmmakers, producers, cinematographers, and studios, is invaluable for those interested in Copenhagen's hotbed of creativity". Stevenson has authored 7 other books on subjects ranging from Tod Browning's film Freaks, to one on the Scandinavian silent film Witchcraft Through the Ages.

He has had dozens of stories published in a wide variety of places, such as "Dusan Makavejev" in the magazine Chemical Imbalance and "Underground USA The Pike St. Cinema" in the magazine Divinity. "Market Street - Movie Theater Graveyard USA" was published in the monthly tabloid dedicated to buying and selling films The Big Reel, and "Film Co-ops: Old Soldiers of the Sixties Still Standing" was published in the New York Independent Monitor.

Stevenson has been a regular contributor to the Bright Lights Film Journal with long form essays, including "George Kuchar: A First-Person Life" and "Robert Cowan (1930-2011): Unsung Superstar of the Underground".

== Film showman ==
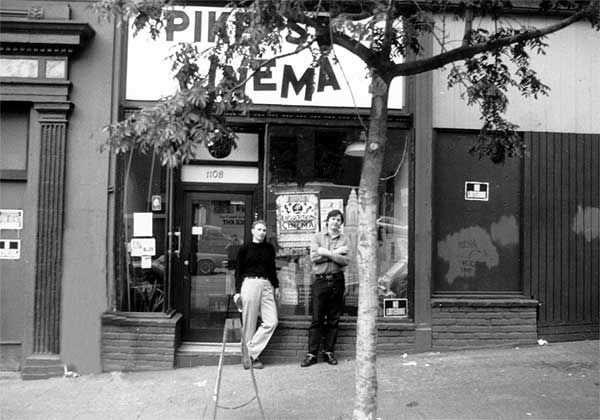
Stevenson on right, Dennis Nyback on left, Pike St. Cinema in Seattle, 1993

While in Boston in 1986, Stevenson began showing films at the bar Chet's Last Call, which was up a flight of stairs and across the street from the Boston Garden. Most screenings were interspersed with live music by local bands. He brought Roy Frumkes to Chet's for a screening of Street Trash, Document of the Dead, and footage from The Last House on the Left. Among the feature films he screened were The Trip, Female Trouble, Faster, Pussycat! Kill! Kill!, and the Diane Linkletter Story. The Chet's gig ended when it went out of business on New Year's Eve 1987.

In 1988, he began a weekly series at the Primal Plunge in the Allston Mall. During the Primal plunge gig he began buying films and creating programs on themes. In 1989 Stevenson did something that had never been done before. He threw 16mm films in a rucksack and flew to Europe, traveling from country to country arranging screenings. Among the films he showed were Assembly Line (1962) and Ulcer at Work (1959). Road Showing goes back a hundred years, with independent producers taking their outside of Hollywood productions from town to town by automobile. Collectively they became known as the "Forty Thieves". What their films lacked in production values and fluid narrative, they made up with spectacle and the offer of forbidden images. Where Stevenson differed from the Forty Thieves, who were producers exploiting their own product, or even road showing underground filmmakers, was by taking quality short films from a wide range of sources on the road. Stevenson, back in Boston, continued screenings at the Primal Plunge.

In 1991 he began midnight screenings at the Coolidge Corner Theatre of classic exploitation and underground films. Stevenson also arranged film screenings for visiting Underground Film Makers.

Stevenson drove cross country showing films in the summer–fall 1990. Among his stops were Detroit, Toronto, Minneapolis, Seattle, Portland and San Francisco. A highlight of the tour was an unauthorized urban Drive-in show in Seattle, projecting from a storefront rooftop across a parking lot to project on the wall of the opposite building. He showed Viva Las Vegas and Hell's Angels on Wheels. The police visited but left after members of the audience shouted "We're watching a movie". He again showed films in Europe in 1991. Later that year he moved to San Francisco. There he arranged film screenings at the ATA Gallery. In 1992 he expanded his SF screenings to the Chameleon Club, the Epicenter, SF Art Institute, and Roxie Cinema.

In 1993 he moved to Denmark. Since then he has toured regularly in Europe and Scandinavia, with regular stops at the Werkstattkino in Munich, the Nova Cinema in Brussels, the Lichtspiel / Kiemathek in Bern, the Kino Komm in Nuremberg, and many other places.

He taught at the European Film College in Ebeltoft, Denmark from 1995 to 1998. He has been featured several times at Yerba Buena Center for the Arts in San Francisco.

== Husets Biograf ==
In 2009, Stevenson started operating Husets Biograf, a cinema in Copenhagen. It is located in Huset, a collection of four buildings originally built in 1911, that had become squats after being abandoned in the 1960s, before being shut down owing to crime and drug use problems. After reopening with rules, it was converted into a movie theater and cafe complex called Husets Biograf in 1973. In 2004, Stevenson started working there as a volunteer, doing his writing and further film research there.

In the fall of 2021, a new association was created by the volunteer group. The association took over management of Husets Biograf in January 2022, and Stevenson was hired as general manager until June 2026, when Huset was closed for renovations, but is expected to open again in 2028.

It is one of the last cinemas in Denmark still screening 16mm and 35mm celluloid movies.

== Bibliography ==
Hotrod Billy & Friends (2019) cover

- Schreck, Nikolas, ed. (1988). The Manson File: The Unexpurgated Charles Manson As Revealed in Letters, Photos, Stories, Songs, Art, Testimony, and Documents. Associate editors are Boyd Rice, Nick Bougas, Jimmi Rocket, John Aes-Nihil, and Jack Stevenson. New York: Amok Press. ISBN 0-941693-04-X.
  - Aes-Nihil, John; Bougas, Nick; Parfrey, Adam; Rice, Boyd; Rocket, Jimmi; Schreck, Nikolas; ——, eds. (2011). The Manson File: Charles Manson As Revealed in Letters, Photos, Stories, Songs, Art, Testimony and Documents. Port Townsend: Feral House. ISBN 978-1-936239-36-8.
- Desperate Visions: The Films of John Waters & the Kuchar Brothers (1996)
- Tod Brownings Freaks (1997)
- Fleshpot: Cinema's Sexual Myth Makers & Taboo Breakers (2000)
- Addicted: The Myth & Menace of Drugs in Film (2000)
- Lars von Trier (2002)
- Land of a Thousand Balconies: Discoveries and Confessions of A B-Movie Archaeologist (2003)
- Dogme Uncut: Lars von Trier, Thomas Vinterberg, and the Gang That Took on Hollywood (2003)
- Witchcraft Through The Ages: The Story Of Haxan, The World's Strangest Film, And The Man Who Made It (2007)
- Scandinavian Blue: The Erotic Cinema of Sweden and Denmark in the 1960s and 1970s (2010)
- Beneath Contempt & Happy to Be There: The Fighting Life of Porn King Al Goldstein (2011)
- The Haunted North (Horror Stories from Viking Country) (2020)
- Hotrod Billy & Friends (2021)
