= The Allston Mall =

Coordinates: 42.3530°N 71.1304°W

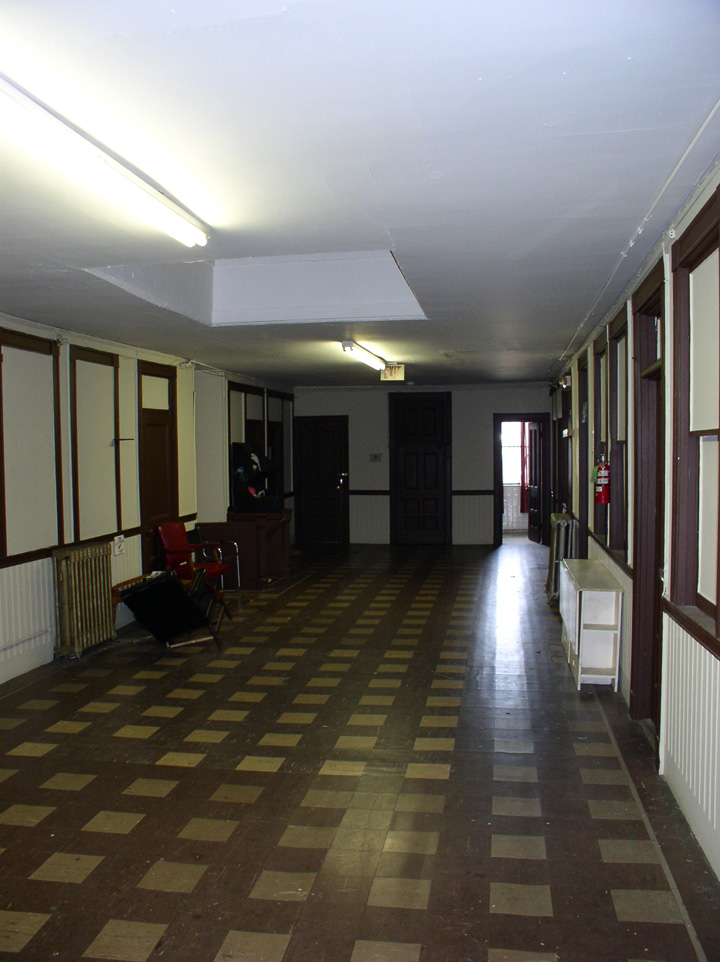
The second floor hallway at 107 Brighton Avenue, Allston, Massachusetts, location of The Allston Mall

The Allston Mall was the provisional name for a space located on the second floor at 107 Brighton Avenue, Allston, Massachusetts, USA. Owned by Marsha Berman (Linden Realty Associates) from approximately 1960 to 2005, it was home to countless examples of low rent alternative entrepreneurialism and cultural experimentation. It also provided off-and-on illegal housing to a number of marginal types. The building itself is a two-storey, mixed-use, commercial brick building constructed somewhere around 1900. It is still in use today but is no longer owned by Berman.

== Enterprises ==
Some of the better-known enterprises in this second-floor area were the Primal Plunge Bookstore (1987–1995), 88 Room art gallery (1988–1998), Naked City Coffee House, the office of Quimby Magazine (1985–1990), The Alcove (198? - 1991), Hot Sugar (1991–1993), Ritual Arts (dates needed), Evil Twin Gallery (dates needed), Garage Video (1995–2000), Keith Restaurant's Outside of America (1998–2001) and the broadcast space of Radio Free Allston (1997).

=== The Primal Plunge Bookstore ===
The Primal Plunge Bookstore was founded and operated by Michael McInnis in 1987, who later sold it to Steven Svymbersky, founder of Quimby's Bookstore in Chicago. The store was primarily an outlet for the then burgeoning genre of “Zines”, self-published and usually photocopied magazines that created an outlet for a variety of D.I.Y. inclinations. Additionally, the Primal Plunge organized events in the huge central hall around which individual stores and offices were arranged. Notable events included an exhibition of paintings by convicted serial killer John Wayne Gacy, screenings of films by Nick Zedd, and a performance by punk rocker GG Allin. Jack Stevenson had a weekly series of films on various topics. In 1991 Svymbersky moved Primal Plunge to Chicago, having found that the student population didn't have a sufficient appetite for zines to keep the bookstore alive.

=== 88 Room ===
88 Room was an alternative visual arts space that concentrated on thematic and conceptually oriented exhibitions. It was founded by Andrew Guthrie, Angela Mark, and Michael Shores in 1988 (hence the name: 88 Room). After one year Mark and Shores dropped out leaving Guthrie to run the space for another nine years. The space was decidedly non-profit, addressing some of the social and cultural issues of the times, most notably the withdrawal of NEA grants from controversial artists in the late 1980s. Gaining a positive reputation among local emerging artists, the gallery was under-reported in the local media. Some notable show were “Pillow Talk”, an exhibition that addressed human sexuality, curated by the collaborative team “Dear Me Suz”: Guthrie, Cheri Eisenberg, and Ron Platt (then an assistant curator at MIT List Visual Arts Center) and “Unknown NY”, a group show curated by Winston C. Robinson that featured a hardly-known-at-the-time Karen Kilimnik. The 88 Room was incorporated as a tax exempt non-profit under the name Local Idea Council, Inc., which occasionally mounted exhibitions at the same location after 88 Room had folded.

=== The Naked City Coffee House ===
The Naked City Coffee House grew out of Naked City magazine (which for a time had offices at 107 Brighton Avenue) published by Al Nidle who later founded the Zeitgeist Gallery in Cambridge, Massachusetts. The Naked City Coffee House was a weekly open mic forum for singer/songwriters and poets. It is where folk singer/songwriter Dar Williams performed for the first time.

=== Quimby Magazine ===
Quimby Magazine was a monthly magazine organized by a group of local artists and friends headed by Steven Svymbersky. It shared offices with The Primal Plunge space. The magazine included comics, writing, and visual art. Svymbersky later moved to Chicago and used the name of the magazine for his bookstore. Svymbersky currently owns and operates Quimby Books in Brooklyn, New York.

=== Hot Sugar ===
Hot Sugar was a vintage clothing and junk shop, owned by 17 year old Suzie Sundae. It resided in a space previously occupied by The Alcove (? - 1991), a record shop owned by Brian Fazekas (RIP). Sundae also took advantage of 107 Brighton Ave's semi-illegal housing. Rosie McCobb wrote of Hot Sugar in Buzz Magazine, vol 2/#2, '92, "Hot Sugar ... (is a) cozy, kitsch-filled parlor offering clothes, housewares, jewelry, and fanzines . . ." (-). Hot Sugar organized occasional events in the building's common area, and at one point, Sundae may have been responsible for painting half of the hallway to look like spumoni ice cream. Sundae went on to open a succession of seven more stores that sold her own clothing lines, that included vintage clothing and antique stores in Boston and NYC (among them Lost Engine Gallery, Harvard Ave. Allston, 1995-1999).

=== Garage Video ===
Garage Video was a specialty video store that focused on hard-to-find B-movies and foreign films. Garage Video also hosted video nights and live music events locally. In 1995, during the difficult first year of the business, the owner-manager of the shop, Will Colwell, was one of the illegal tenants living in the Allston Mall. Garage Video and Outside of America co-tenanted from 1999 to 2001.

=== Keith Restaurant's 'Outside of America' ===
Outside of America was a round-the-clock 'inconvenience store' and performance space that focused on experimental and outsider music recordings, artist's books, and objects lacking use-value operated by Harvard student Keith Rogerson. Outside of America hosted live music and sound installations locally and within the mall's common space including the infamous "invisible performance' with collective The Chinese Restaurants and Arthur Doyle at Zeitgeist Gallery. Originally occupying the corner of Brighton and Linden Avenues, Outside of America co-tenanted the space with Garage Video in its final years, migrating to 'appointment only' and ultimately 'invitation only' access for consumers.

=== Radio Free Allston and Allston-Brighton Free Radio ===
Radio Free Allston was started by Steve Provizer using a 20-watt FM broadcaster bought through a mail-order supplier. It was on the air from May to October 1997. Radio Free Allston broadcast from the 88 Room, which at this stage had been only intermittently producing exhibitions. The station was technically illegal, operating without a Federal Communications Commission (FCC) license, but Provizer sought to distance himself and Radio Free Allston from the descriptive “Pirate Radio” by providing a community service in the form of news programming, senior citizen shows, minority forums, and interviews with local businesses, politicians, artists, and social activists. In addition, a wide range of music programming included, but was not limited to, Hip-Hop, Latin, and all genres of Rock, Roots, and R&B. Day-to-day operations, fundraising, equipment maintenance, and logistics depended on a core of dedicated volunteers. The station was awarded a certificate of merit by the Boston City Council, but was shut down by the FCC a few days before its first 72-hour broadcast featuring a House, Drum and Bass, Hip-Hop DJing marathon. Allston-Brighton Free Radio followed in Radio Free Allston's footsteps, a free-form AM radio station that existed off and on in the Mall from 2000 to 2005 and featured a wide array of programming.
