= The Fifth Path =

American music magazine

- Cover of the first issue
- Editor: Robert Ward
- Categories: Culture, music
- Frequency: Irregular
- Founder: Robert Ward
- Founded: 1990
- First issue: 1991
- Final issue Number: 1994; 32 years ago 5
- Country: United States
- Based in: Carmichael, California, U.S.
- Language: English

The Fifth Path was an American right-wing post-industrial and neofolk music and culture magazine founded and edited by Robert Ward. It included interviews and articles on topics relevant to the subculture, and media reviews on books and music releases. Topics reflecting the interests of Ward, like occultism and paganism, were focused on. It was established in 1991, and published 5 issues before shuttering in 1994.

== History ==
The magazine was founded by Robert Martin Ward, who was born in Sacramento, California, in 1968. He had an interest in LaVeyan Satanism, paganism, and the occult. Shortly before creating the magazine, he joined Stephen Flowers's Rune Guild heathen organization.

Ward established the magazine in 1990. Its first issue was released in 1991. It was published irregularly. It was published out of Carmichael, California. Starting in issue #3, writer Michael J. Moynihan became involved, writing articles for the magazine and its associate editor by issues #4 and #5. Robert N. Taylor also contributed. It published 5 issues before shuttering in 1994.

== Contents and profile ==
The magazine was rightist in political orientation and focused on music and cultural topics, particularly the post-industrial and neofolk music scenes. Topics of interest to Ward, like occultism and paganism, were focused on. It has been described as a fanzine. It was one of a few "extreme culture" magazines in its niche, and was described by writer Kevin Coogan as a magazine close in orientation to the Abraxas Foundation. Writer Spencer Sunshine described it as part of the wider "Abraxas Circle". Mattias Gardell described it as part of the "apocalypse culture". It was similar in its coverage to another zine, Ohm Clock. The magazine discussed the intersection of fascism with these topics, though Ward denied that he or the magazine was fascist or National Socialist.

Fifth Path included interviews and articles on topics relevant to the subculture. People interviewed in Fifth Path included Boyd Rice, Death in June, Moynihan, and Adam Parfrey. It had a large media review section, including on books, music, and other magazines, particularly those focused on deviant or bizarre topics. Music genres covered ranged widely, from satanist black metal to industrial music. It reviewed the neo-Nazi book Siege, a book that Ward typeset.

== Legacy ==
In 2016, a writer for the website Dangerous Minds called The Fifth Path "crucial reading" for that era of industrial and neofolk music culture. Kevin Coogan described it as one of the most interesting magazines in this extreme niche.

Ward went on to edit the journal Vor Tru for the Ásatrú Alliance, and became the gothi of the Úlfhethnar Kindred heathen group that he founded. He later left Vor Tru. He also wrote for the magazine Rant, and worked for StateNet from 1995 until his death. Ward died in 2004 at the age of 35 from an unspecified illness.
