= Nikolas Schreck =

American songwriter (born 1958/59)

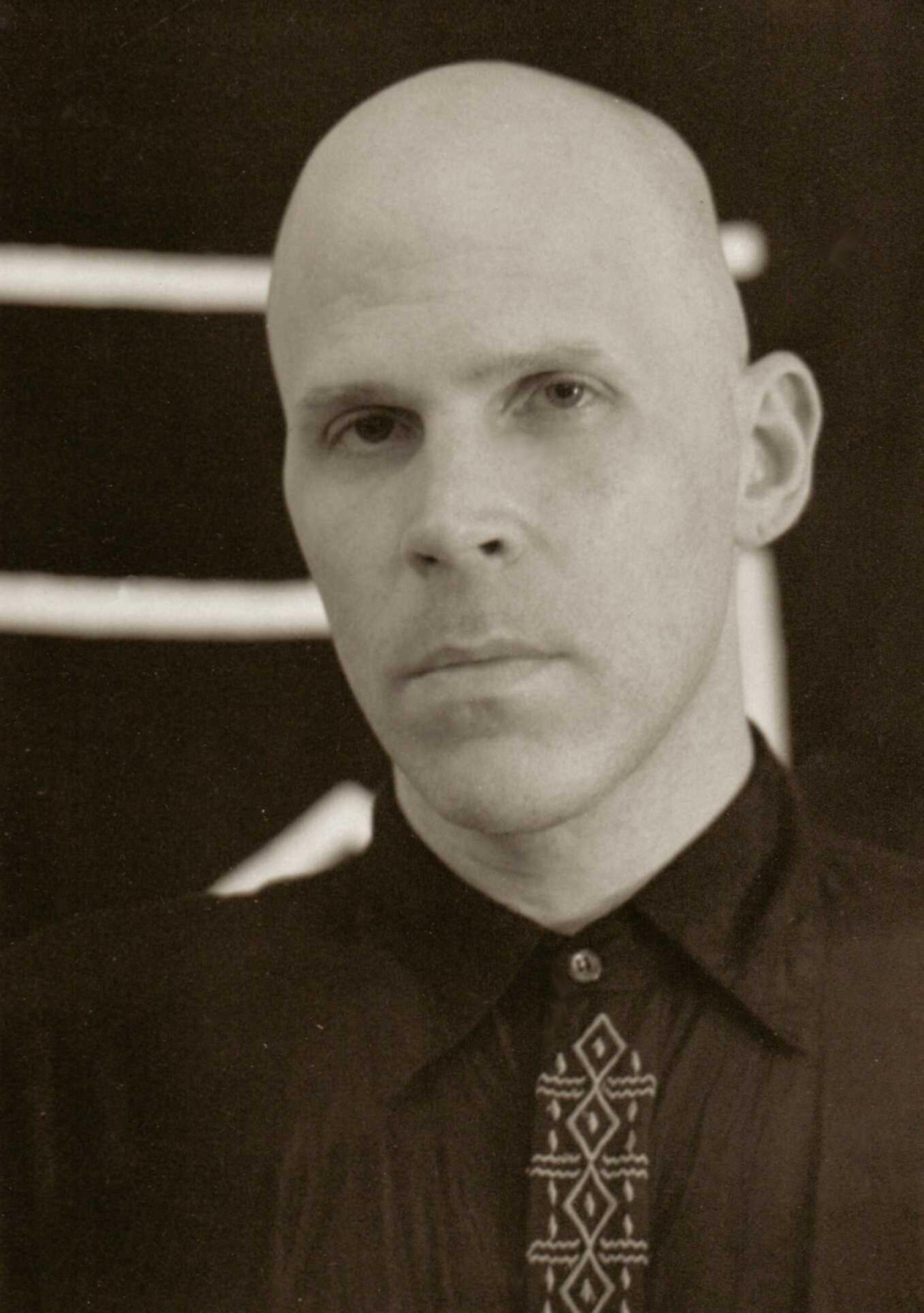
- Schreck in 2005
- Born: 1958 or 1959 (age 67–68); United States
- Known for: Author; musician; filmmaker
- Spouse: Zeena Schreck (m. 1988; div. 2015)

Nikolas Schreck (born 1958 or 1959) is an American singer-songwriter, author and film-maker. Schreck founded the music and performance collective Radio Werewolf, and was the co-founder of the Abraxas Foundation. He was formerly a Satanist and affiliated with the Church of Satan and the Temple of Set, but later disavowed both and left the Church of Satan. He later became a Buddhist. He collaborated musically with his former wife, American singer and musician Zeena Schreck. He has written several books and directed the 1989 documentary Charles Manson Superstar.

== Career ==
Nikolas Schreck is not his birth name; he changed his name in his 20s. Schreck means terror or fright in German. Schreck was the founder, frontman, and sole constant member of the Gothic band Radio Werewolf. He founded the band in 1984 in Los Angeles, California. As the group's lead singer he performed theatrical ritual performances, which were billed as "Rallies of the Radio Werewolf Youth Party". The band embraced initially ironic and tongue-in-cheek Nazi symbolism early in its life.

Schreck was a practitioner of black magic and founded The Werewolf Order. He later connected the Order to the Church of Satan and co-led it with his wife Zeena. He worked in the late 1980s with Church of Satan founder Anton LaVey (Zeena's father), publicly speaking in support for the Church. He was made a member of the Church of Satan by LaVey.

Schreck was part of the Abraxas Foundation, a collective made up of Schreck, Boyd Rice, Adam Parfrey, and Michael J. Moynihan. The Abraxas Foundation, which began in 1987 and which Schreck declared himself a co-funder, described itself as "an occult-fascist think tank" and focused on social darwinist philosophy. Schreck described it as "sort of a Thule Society for the '90s." In San Francisco in August 1987, Schreck's right ear was cut off. According to Boyd Rice and another associate of Schreck, this came after Schreck had passed out pro-AIDS leaflets in an area where gay sex workers were common. In retaliation, a gang of "gay leatherboys" chased him and cut his ear off.

He is an advocate of the cult leader Charles Manson. Schreck personally corresponded with him. He does not believe the official narrative of the Manson murders, arguing Manson was a "talented, poetic musician with wisdom and with a strong, powerful philosophy who got caught up in these tragic crimes. But he was not the sole instigator and responsible for the crimes". Radio Werewolf held rallies for Manson. He was credited as the editor of the book The Manson File in 1988, published by Parfrey's Amok Press. Schreck directed the 1989 documentary Charles Manson Superstar. Schreck wrote a different book, also named The Manson File, but subtitled Myth and Reality of an Outlaw Shaman, in 2011, which is 991 pages long.

Schreck appeared multiple times on the white supremacist public-access show Race and Reason, run by white supremacist Tom Metzger. On a 1988 appearance to promote The Manson File, he spoke of his own projects and ideology, and declared his intention to start a "cultural war on every front" against "Judeo-Christian values". During this appearance he described "race-mixing" as "genetic suicide", positively quoted Adolf Hitler, and espoused an Odinist kind of white nationalism.

When his wife Zeena renounced the Church of Satan, he followed suit. Schreck and Zeena compiled a fact sheet entitled "Anton LaVey: Legend and Reality" criticizing LaVey and claiming to expose him as a charlatan. They later joined Michael A. Aquino's Temple of Set. Eventually they left over a belief dispute, then founded the Sethian Liberation Movement. Together they authored a book, Demons of the Flesh: The Complete Guide to Left Hand Path Sex Magic, in 2002. He and Zeena divorced in 2015. As of 2019, he was based in Berlin, and is a Buddhist.

== Bibliography ==
- ——, ed. (1988). The Manson File: The Unexpurgated Charles Manson As Revealed in Letters, Photos, Stories, Songs, Art, Testimony, and Documents. Associate editors are Boyd Rice, Nick Bougas, Jimmi Rocket, John Aes-Nihil, and Jack Stevenson. New York: Amok Press. ISBN 0-941693-04-X.
  - Aes-Nihil, John; Bougas, Nick; Parfrey, Adam; Rice, Boyd; Rocket, Jimmi; ——; Stevenson, Jack, eds. (2011). The Manson File: Charles Manson As Revealed in Letters, Photos, Stories, Songs, Art, Testimony and Documents. Port Townsend: Feral House. ISBN 978-1-936239-36-8.
- —— (2001). Flowers From Hell: A Satanic Reader. Creation Books. ISBN 1-84068-024-5.
- —— (2001). The Satanic Screen: An Illustrated Guide to the Devil in Cinema. Creation Books. ISBN 1-84068-043-1.
- ——; Schreck, Zeena (2002). Demons of the Flesh: The Complete Guide to Left Hand Path Sex Magic. Creation Books. ISBN 1-84068-061-X.
- —— (2011). The Manson File: Myth and Reality of an Outlaw Shaman. Note: Different book from the 1988 The Manson File.

== Filmography ==
- Charles Manson Superstar (1989), director
