= Zeena Schreck =

American artist (born 1963)

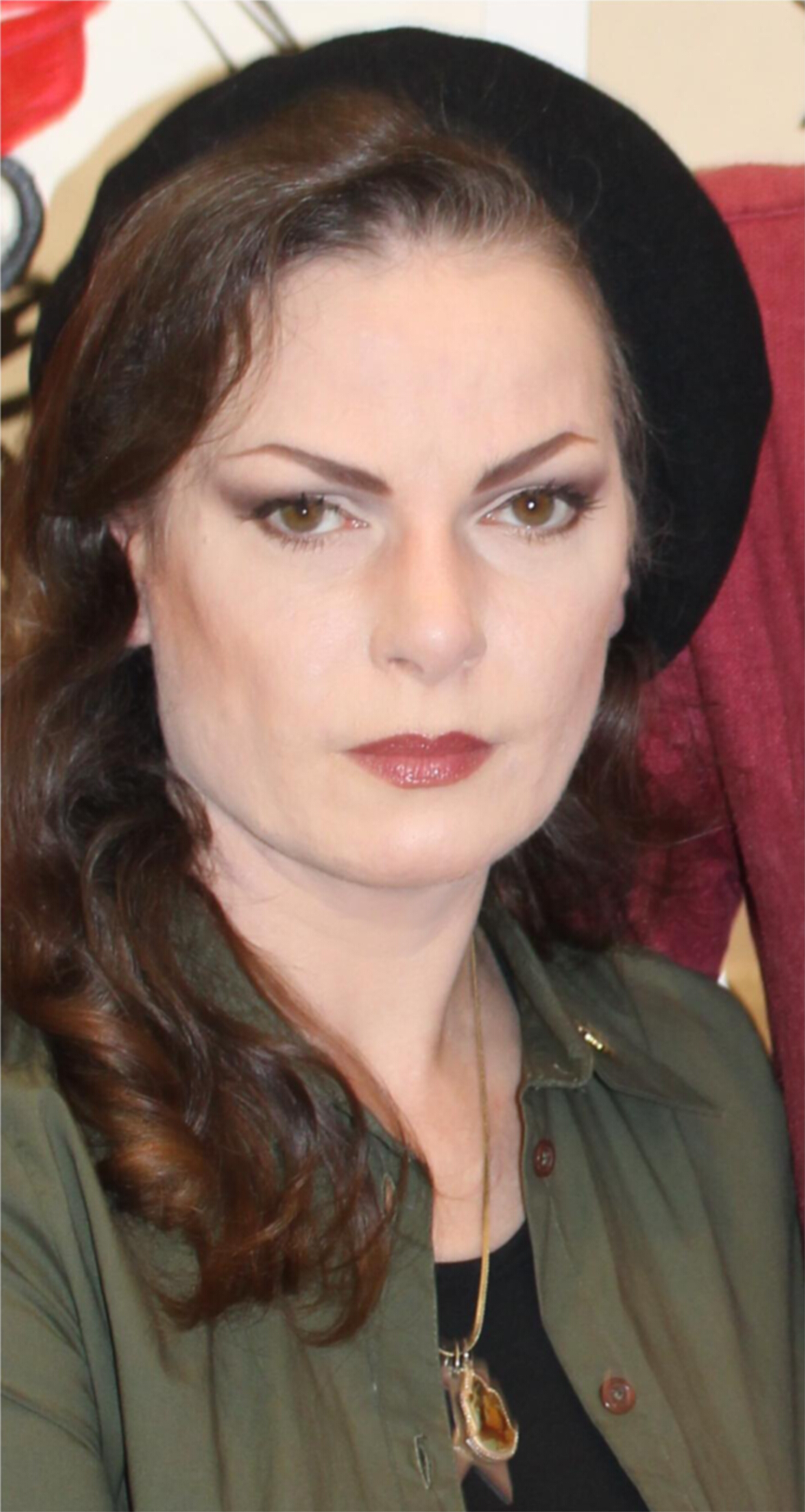
- Zeena in 2011
- Born: Zeena Galatea LaVey; November 19, 1963 (age 62); San Francisco, California, U.S.
- Occupations: Singer; musician; composer; performance artist; photographer; visual artist; author; religious teacher
- Years active: 1967–present
- Spouse: Nikolas Schreck (m. 1988; div. 2015)
- Parent(s): Anton LaVey; Diane Hegarty
- Relatives: Karla LaVey (half-sister)
- Musical career
- Genres: Electroacoustic music, sound art, field recording, soundscape, minimalism, magic realism, ritual music, experimental, dark ambient, ambient, post-industrial, neoclassical, gothic rock, post-punk
- Instruments: Vocals, keyboard, percussion, flute, synthesizer, electronics, sampling
- Labels: Gymnastic Records, Unclean Productions, Wolfslair, Inc., Video Werewolf, Musicus Phÿcus, The Epicurean, Bat-Cave Productions
- Website: zeenaschreck.com

Zeena Galatea Schreck (née LaVey; born November 19, 1963), also known by the mononym ZEENA, is a Berlin-based American visual and musical artist, author and the spiritual leader of the Sethian Liberation Movement (SLM), which she founded in 2002.

Zeena was raised within the Church of Satan, and came to international prominence early in life as the organization's first spokesperson, defending the church during the 1980s. She resigned her position in 1990, severed ties with her father, and renounced LaVeyan Satanism. Her religious path eventually led to teaching Tibetan Tantric Buddhism.

== Early years and family ==
Zeena was born in San Francisco on November 19, 1963 to Anton LaVey and Diane Hegarty, co-founders of the Church of Satan. On May 23, 1967, three-year-old Zeena had the first and most highly publicized Satanic baptism in history performed by her father. The ceremony garnered worldwide publicity for her parents, with a reenactment of the ceremony recorded for The Satanic Mass vinyl LP in 1968. Directly following that event, the child Zeena was subjected to hundreds of journalistic reports and interviews, particularly in adult tabloid crime and men's magazines. Anton LaVey biographer, Burton H. Wolf described a thirteen-year-old Zeena in his introduction to her father's The Satanic Bible as "Zeena, remembered by people who saw the famous photo of the Satanic Church baptism as a tiny tot, but now a gorgeously developed teenager attracting a growing pack of wolves, human male variety." In an interview with The Guardsman, she describes becoming a mother at the age of fourteen while living in "a stifling, dysfunctional family life."

Zeena was married to her Radio Werewolf band partner and frequent collaborator Nikolas Schreck from 1988 to 2015. In 2019, both parties issued a jointly written public statement on their respective websites stating, "[...]in 2015, after having been separated since 2007, we agreed to amicably divorce.[...]this will be our only public comment of clarification on what remains private transitions into new phases of two separate lives." Zeena chose to keep her married name stating in an FAQ on her website that she would not reinstate her born surname (LaVey) "due to the heavy weight of negative karma that travels with it."

== Early artistic influences and training ==
Zeena's work as a photographer, visual artist, musician/composer and writer are heavily influenced by mystical and magical traditions. Stylistically, she gravitated at an early age to artists and mentors whose art was imbued with a mystical or magical vision.

As a teenager and young adult, she trained in and studied theater, drama and film. At sixteen years of age, Zeena passed the High School equivalency exam, which enabled her to leave High School early, begin working legally and enroll in City College of San Francisco, majoring in drama. In addition to CCSF's Drama Department, she also received instruction from Stella Adler Studio of Acting, Eric Morris acting coach, Viola Spolin's student Marcia Kimmell of The Next Stage Improvisation Theater San Francisco, and the San Francisco School of Dramatic Arts. Her study focus was Hellenic sacred drama, improvisation, and various branches of the Stanislavski 'system' and method acting.

The importance of lineage as a vehicle for passing down metaphysical energy guides Zeena's ritual art. She traces the lineage of her magical art to the mentorship of her godfather, filmmaker Kenneth Anger. During the 1960s and 1970s, Anger transmitted the influences of Curtis Harrington, Jean Cocteau, and Maya Deren on his own work to Zeena during her childhood and adolescence.

Zeena also became a long-time friend of director Curtis Harrington, who cast her as a Dietrich-like character in his last film, Usher (2000).

== Religious groups ==
In 1985, Zeena became the high priestess of the Church of Satan, and remained its spokesperson until 1990. In 1990, Zeena left the Church of Satan and renounced her father's teachings of LaVeyan Satanism. She later became a devotee of the ancient Egyptian deity Set, becoming high priestess of the Temple of Set in 2002, and forming the Sethian Liberation Movement later that same year.

Interviews, articles and reviews from 2011 to 2013 referred to her conversion to Tibetan Tantric Buddhism in the Drikung, Karma Kagyu and Nyingma lineages, as well as her status as the spiritual leader of the Sethian Liberation Movement (SLM).

=== Church of Satan ===
In the 1980s in the United States, there was a moral panic about Satanic ritual abuse, sometimes referred to as the "Satanic Panic". It started with the publication of the now discredited memoir Michelle Remembers in 1980, and culminated in the McMartin preschool trial, a heavily publicized trial which ran from 1984 to 1990, during which prosecutors managed, through aggressive and leading questions, to get over 300 of the preschool's children to testify that they had been sexually abused by their teachers as part of Satanic rituals. The charges were all eventually dropped. Media coverage during the trial tended to side with the prosecutors, and often singled out the Church of Satan as the culprit. This led Zeena to volunteer to serve as the Church of Satan's first spokesperson. In a September 2011 interview, Zeena recalled,

In 1985, a US news show called 20/20 accused The Satanic Bible of being responsible for child daycare Satanic ritual abuse, allegations which were new then. ... I called my father and asked him what his media strategy would be to deal with this catastrophe. Nothing. He didn't care. As far as he was concerned it didn't concern him. It wasn't anything he needed to worry about. He certainly wasn't going out in public to do anything about it. He admitted that many media sources had already contacted him and he was just going to ignore it until it went away. I tried to convince him that this would only get worse if he didn't respond and that he really needed to get someone to answer calls quickly or it would be taken as an admission of guilt or suspicion. Finally he admitted he had no one to deal with interviews or media. I offered to help temporarily until he found someone. This was not what I'd intended to do with my life, I had other plans.

As the Church of Satan's spokesperson, Zeena appeared in nationally syndicated programs such as The Phil Donahue Show, Nightline with Ted Koppel, Entertainment Tonight, The Late Show and Secrets & Mysteries. She also appeared on the Sally Jessy Raphael Show, alongside her husband, debating several Christians who were invited onto the program to expound their own religious views. Internationally, she appeared in such media presentations as Italy's RAI Mixer show and Toronto's Industrial Video presentation dedicated to a compilation of Zeena's TV appearances, ending with a lengthy radio interview for CUIT.

She was also interviewed in a broadcast of "Devil Worship: Exposing Satan's Underground" released by Geraldo Rivera in 1988. Zeena sat alongside the Temple of Set founder/High Priest Michael A. Aquino, and repeatedly denied the rumors circulating at the time that the Church of Satan was in any way involved with ritual abuse. She also called the testimony of claimants involved into question, asking them rhetorically why, if people were being forced to give birth to babies for sacrificial rituals, no remains had ever been found.

In 1989, Anton LaVey's 1971 book The Compleat Witch, or What to Do When Virtue Fails was reprinted as The Satanic Witch, with an introduction by Zeena. She toured the U.S. promoting her father's work in his absence, as he was no longer interested in making media appearances. Most of the appearances were made at the behest of the Church of Satan as its spokesperson.

In 1989, while promoting the book, Zeena appeared with her then husband Nikolas Schreck (not a member of the COS) in an interview with televangelist Bob Larson, during which they both refuted any Satanic criminal ties, and pressed Larson on his own ideals, stating that it was hypocritical of him to endorse such claims by Christians, pointing out the Christian background of many criminals, and violent acts within Christian history, such as the crusades.

Zeena was also in regular contact with law enforcement agencies and personnel, including Detective Patrick Metoyer of the LAPD and Robert D. Hicks, law-enforcement specialist with the Virginia Department of Criminal Justice Services and author of several precedent-setting treatises including In Pursuit of Satan: The Police and The Occult. In Pursuit of Satan began the wave of authoritative reports debunking the Satanic Panic. Much of what Hicks gleaned from Zeena's dialogs with him was included in this treatise. Prior to Zeena's dialogs and meetings with government agencies, police and law enforcement had only a very limited knowledge of Satanism. In 1992, the FBI issued an official report refuting the criminal conspiracy theories of this time.

Zeena's Interview on KJTV with Tony Valdez, 1990, was the last interview she granted as public representative and High Priestess of the Church of Satan before resigning.

In a March 2013 interview televised by Network Awesome, Zeena spoke for the first time on camera about her experiences with media during the "Satanic Panic" years.

=== Leaving the Church of Satan, 1990 ===
In 1990, she resigned from the Church of Satan and renounced LaVeyan Satanism. According to Zeena's official web site, "In the process of defending the Church of Satan from these unfounded claims in the U.S. mass media, Zeena's media appearances attracted a new upsurge of membership to the formerly moribund organization even as she began to question and ultimately reject the self-centered philosophy she promoted. As she toured the United States on behalf of the Church of Satan, Zeena's crisis of faith reached its highpoint when she learned that most of her father's self-created legend was based on lies and that many of his works were plagiarized. When jealousy and spite motivated Anton LaVey and his administrator Densley-Barton to actually endanger Zeena's life, she could no longer continue to cover up her progenitor's true character in good conscience. This behind the scenes tension should be kept in mind when viewing or hearing Zeena's interviews from that time."

After her renunciation of the Church of Satan, Zeena Schreck severed use of her born name "LaVey" and legally changed her last name, for all official matters, to "Schreck". In a December 30, 1990, open letter to Michael A. Aquino of the Temple of Set, she stated: "In light of all of the factors herein, I also officially severed my given surname [LaVey] and now prefer to be known only as Zeena. As I feel naturally aristocratic, I also have no need for the empty titles of Magistra or High Priestess that have been bandied about and fought over."

Since then, she does not accept correspondence addressed to "Zeena LaVey," "Zeena LaVey-Schreck", or any variant using the name LaVey.

=== Temple of Set ===
Zeena began to pursue ancient religious practices relating to the Egyptian god Set and setianism. She has stated, "While I was residing in Vienna, I visited a museum where a Sethian altar lives. It was there that I had a very profound experience that enabled me to clearly see the course for my future." At the time, she was also practicing traditional tantra and yoga. Her experiences within those two systems, as well as her central role and life's experience in other occult and esoteric milieux, would contribute considerably to the content of her book Demons of the Flesh, co-authored with Nikolas Schreck.

In 1997, Zeena and co-guest Nikolas Schreck once again debated Christian Minister Bob Larson. This time she did not represent Satanism but rather Sethianism, though the interview was titled "Showdown With Satanism". At the time she was III° Priestess of Set.

In 2002, Zeena became High Priestess of the Temple of Set.

=== Sethian Liberation Movement ===
The Sethian Liberation Movement was founded on November 8, 2002, after Zeena Schreck resigned from the Temple of Set with four Masters of the Temple of Set (one Master, Magister Michael Kelly, was also a member of the corporate Board of Directors for the California non-profit organization The Temple of Set). Details of the departure were explained in a letter dated November 8, 2002, from the newly departed Temple of Set Council of Nine member to an Adept IIº member regarding the events leading to Zeena's resignation and the founding of the Storm, later renamed the Sethian Liberation Movement.

Shortly after Zeena Schreck resigned from the Temple of Set, a Disinfo listing for the Temple of Set from December 17, 2002, under the heading: 2002 Schism: The Storm Awakens reported, "High Priest Don Webb stepped down, and, on 9 September 2002, was succeeded by High Priestess Zeena Schreck. Six weeks after the Helsinki Conclave (September 2002), Zeena, Magister Aaron Besson, Magister Nikolas Schreck and Magister Michael Kelly all resigned on 8 November 2002. Four Priests Alfred Rodriguez, Kevin Rockhill, Jared Davison and Richard Gavin also resigned. Temple of Set sources have claimed that eighteen Initiates have resigned while others have estimated the number at closer to sixty (including several Orders, Elements, and members of the Adept and Setian degrees)."

In one of the Sethian Liberation Movement's earliest public Frequently Answered Questions documents released, Disinfo referenced it in their post covering the Temple of Set/Storm schism: "... [the] document defines the new and as-yet unnamed group as ... a loose confederation of Setian Teachers and Students, an alliance of Orders." The group has eschewed the Temple's administrative and non-profit structure, as well as its degree system and titles. "We work together through mutual respect and interest, not through any organizational limitations or restrictions", the FAQ document states. Finally, its founders have sought to avoid the "magical society" structure of post-Theosophy groups: the confederation is "an ongoing Magical Working in which we may participate, a living, dynamic and evolving thing."

Zeena's homepage states, "Drawing on her own triumph over these and other dysfunctional family experiences, Zeena, a professional bereavement counsellor, founded The Sethian Liberation Movement's public outreach program PHOENIX to help others in similar situations." It explains that "Since 2004 Phoenix provides spiritual healing for victims of exploitative pseudo-religious organizations, former gang members, whistle-blowing ex-employees of corrupt corporations and governmental agencies, relatives of the violently mentally ill, and survivors of all forms of institutional abuse, including secretly abused children and spouses of prominent personalities."

== In current popular culture ==
On December 10, 2012, Zeena curated a stream of videos for Berlin-based streaming network Network Awesome's Live Music Show, with audio and visual clips arranged in an autobiographical manner.

On March 18, 2013, Network Awesome's daily program opened with an exclusive original production featuring Zeena Schreck's first one-on-one televised interview in 22 years, conducted by artist Jen Ray. Network Awesome spotlighted Zeena with a full day of programming, referencing various facets of her life. Other features in the day's program included archival interviews of Zeena and documentaries relating to her current spiritual pursuits and practices.

In 2011, a conspiracy theory in a vein similar to that of the Ted Cruz–Zodiac Killer meme arose online, conflating Zeena with popular singer Taylor Swift. The conspiracy endlessly recycles in all languages. In 2023, Teen Vogue reported it as one of the "8 most popular conspiracy theories in history".

== Music and performance art ==
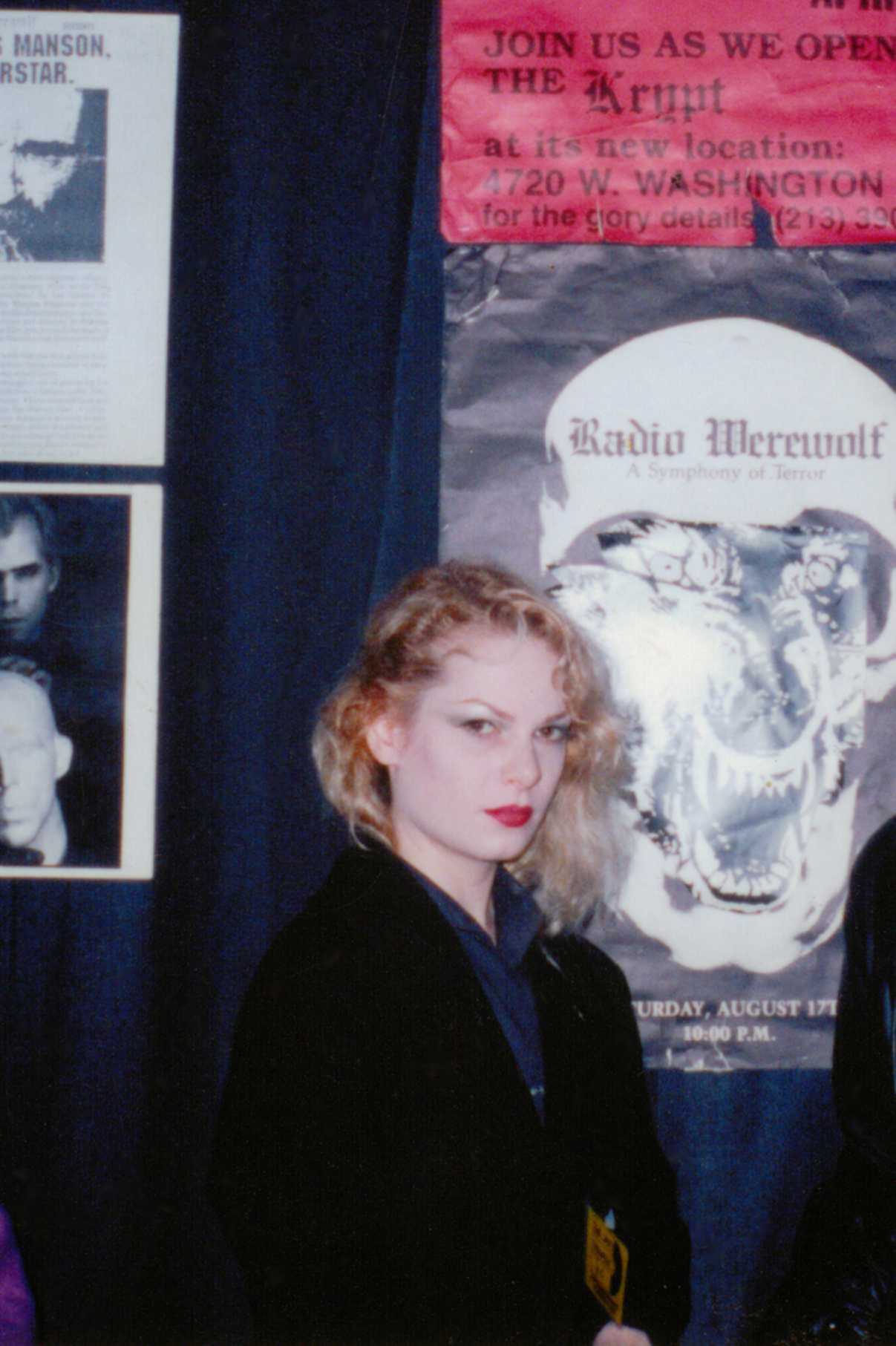
Schreck at the Berlin Independence Days Music Festival, 1989

=== The 8/8/88 rally ===
On August 8, 1988, a large gathering converged on the Strand Theater in San Francisco for the film debut of a mockumentary about Charles Manson. The event was planned and carried out by Nikolas Schreck. Zeena spoke at the beginning of the rally and a film of her baptism was played. In a 2011 interview with Zeena for French music magazine Obsküre, she stated that 8-8-88 "would be the only performance that Nikolas, Evil Wilhelm [the original Radio Werewolf percussionist], and I ever performed live together. That marked the transition point spanning three phases of Radio Werewolf: 1) the Nikolas Schreck/Evil Wilhelm collaboration, 2) the solo Nikolas Schreck phase, and 3) the Nikolas Schreck/Zeena collaboration." Also featured were NON, Amok Press and Kris Force, a musician who at the time owned the Strand Theater. Geraldo Rivera's "Devil Worship: Exposing Satan's Underground" film crew filmed the event, as well as interviews with all involved, to use for the network special.

=== Radio Werewolf ===
From 1988 to 1993, Zeena was co-director of the experimental musical project Radio Werewolf. She served as composer, vocalist, musician and graphic designer on the Radio Werewolf recordings "Songs for the End of the World", "The Lightning and the Sun", "Bring Me The Head of Geraldo Rivera", "Boots/Witchcraft" and "Love Conquers All." Her performances were exclusively European-based at that time.

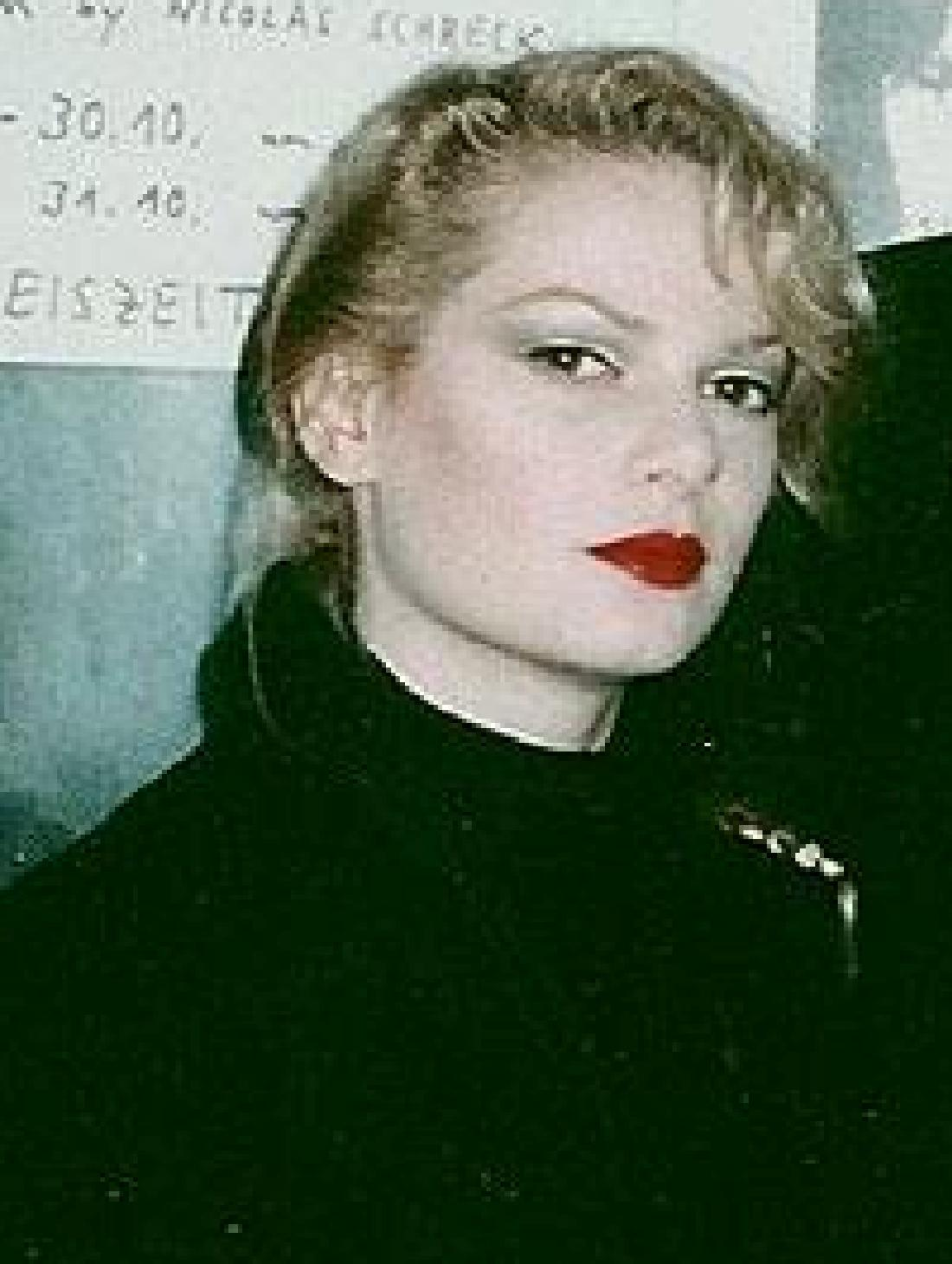
Zeena at the German premiere of Charles Manson Superstar, a film she co-produced and narrated, in 1989

In 2012, Radio Werewolf released The Vinyl Solution – Analog Artifacts: Ritual Instrumentals and Undercover Versions Compact Disc, the first authorized Radio Werewolf release in 20 years.

In 2016, Classic Rock magazine ranked Radio Werewolf No. 4 on their 'The 25 weirdest bands of all time' list, stating: "Formed during the height of 'Satanic Panic' hysteria in mid-80's America, Radio Werewolf was once considered 'the most dangerous band in the world', largely due to the notoriety of their vocalist, Zeena Schreck ...". In 2016, The Top Tens Most Satanic Bands listed Radio Werewolf, "Yes!, Since when does Heavy Metal have to be the only satanic music. Why not dark organ Gothic/Deathrock."

In 2019, Amy Haben's article "Subversive Grooves: Music From the Dark Side," for the February 25 edition of online zine Please Kill Me, describes Radio Werewolf and Zeena, "Radio Werewolf is one of the coolest bands you probably never heard of. It's a dark trip on to the set of a vintage horror movie.[...] Zeena's version of Nancy Sinatra's "These Boots Are Made For Walkin'," features a World War II-esque sample sound of marching boots to kick it off the song followed by a deep bass line reminiscent of Nilsson's "Jump into The Fire." Zeena seduces with sultry vocals and smacks a bit of German into the middle of the tune.

== Solo music career ==
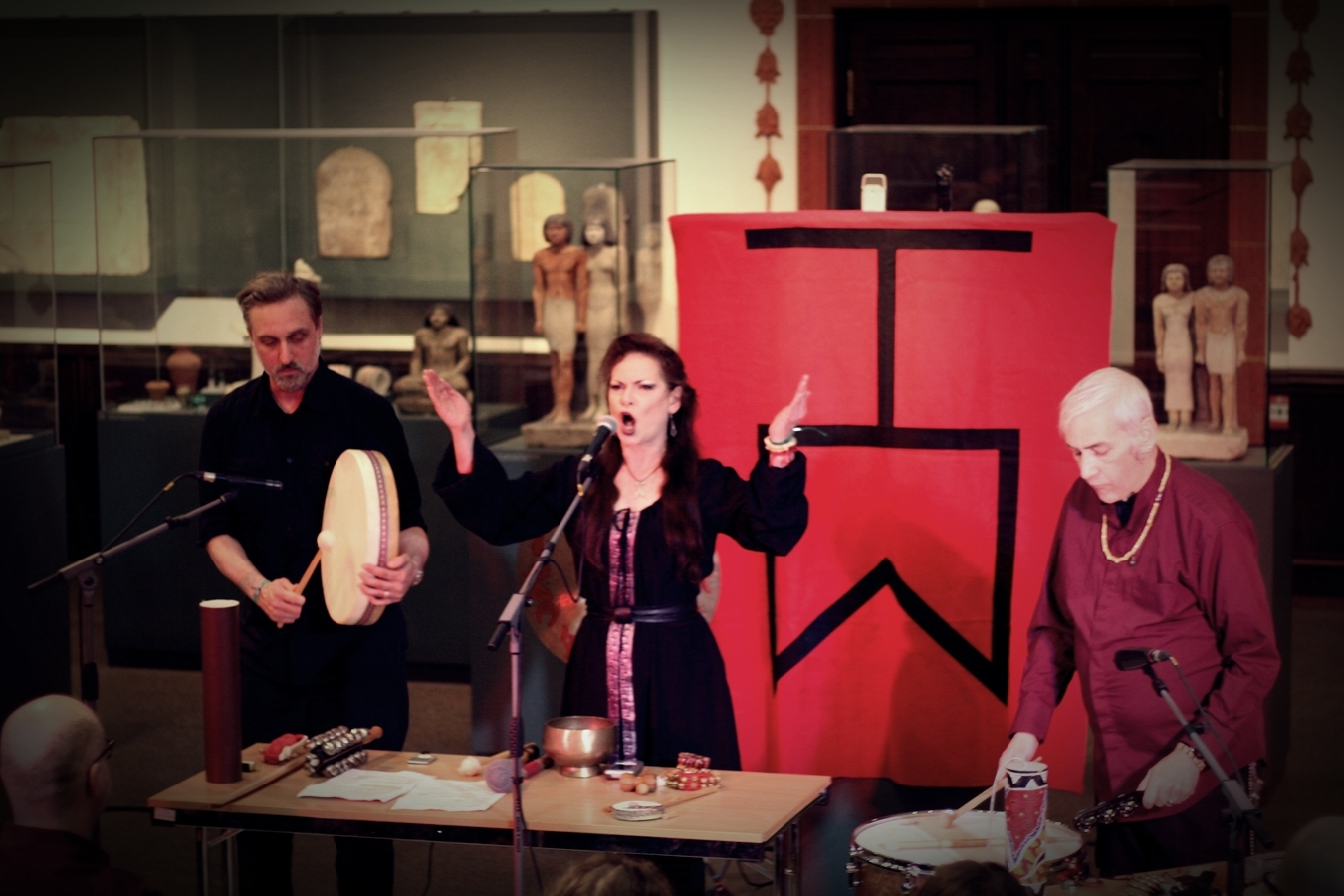
Schreck with John Murphy and Cory Vielma at the Wave-Gotik-Treffen festival in May 2015

=== Performa 13, New York ===
On November 8, 2013, the visual art performance biennial Performa presented Zeena accompanied by New York musician Hisham Bharoocha (first percussion) and Danish musician Anders Hermund (second percussion), for a vocal based work that tapped into the ritual use of sacred syllables from Vajrayana, Shaktism and Sethian-Typhonian left-way tantric practices, "originating from emptiness, gradually transforming into a sound and voice collage on a stage set design by Frank Haines." This was Zeena's first solo performance in her native country since her expatriation to Europe in 1990.

David Sanderson described the event, "Jingling bells and padded footsteps echoed in the darkness. The curtains silently parted, dramatically revealing an electrified, vermilion environment. Dead center, with hands held in the Mudra position, stood the seemingly twenty-foot tall goddess Zeena. With a painted gong behind her, Bharoocha and Hermund adorned her sides. Bharoocha lit incense that swept through the audience as Zeena's commanding gaze pierced us all (everyone I talked to after the show swore she was staring directly at them)."

=== Wave-Gotik-Treffen music festival ===
On May 23, 2015, after a 24-year retreat from musical performances, Zeena made her official return to music in Europe, now as a solo artist, at the Wave-Gotik-Treffen festival in Leipzig, Germany. In 2025 a ten-year anniversary album of the live performance was released on Bandcamp. The concert, held amid "the sacred, magically charged ancient artifacts housed in Leipzig's Egyptian Museum (at the Leipzig University)," was a unique ritual soundscape which Zeena composed especially for the theme of that environment. She was accompanied by Cory Vielma and John Murphy. This was John Murphy's penultimate performance. Having suffered a long illness, John Murphy died less than five months after this concert. In accordance to Murphy's wishes, Zeena conducted the traditional Tibetan Buddhist ceremony for the passing of consciousness as he died. In 2016, a tribute to John Murphy as a 3CD compilation set entitled "All My Sins Remembered – The Sonic Worlds of John Murphy" was released by The Epicurean record label. On it, a live track from Zeena's WGT concert, featuring Murphy's electronic-percussion is included. The CD booklet also features cover portrait of Murphy by Zeena.

=== First recording as solo artist ===
Zeena's first independently produced solo EP album was released on March 11, 2020. Bring Me The Head of F.W. Murnau: A Ghost Story in Six Acts was inspired by news reports that the director's head had been stolen from his grave under mysterious circumstances. Many of the sounds incorporated in the tracks were captured in field recordings at Murnau's former residence in Berlin and at his grave-site in Stahnsdorf, Germany. A pre-sales, limited, signed, and numbered edition of 89 CDs was released first; regular (unsigned) CDs and digital downloads are distributed through the Zeena Schreck Bandcamp site.

== Discography ==
=== As solo artist ===
- ZEENA Live at Wave-Gothic-Treffen Leipzig: A Typhonian Tantric Ritual Soundscape Ten-Year Anniversary Album. Released on June 6, 2025 the album is a live performance recording of ZEENA's return to the European music stage. The concert, held amid "the sacred, magically charged ancient artefacts housed in Leipzig's Egyptian Museum (at the Leipzig University), was a unique ritual soundscape which Zeena composed especially for the theme of that environment."
- Transcend debuted at Snow Gallery NYC on June 3, 2023, as soundtrack for the third exhibition in a series, 'Movement of the Triangle,' inspired by Kandinsky's 'Concerning the Spiritual in Art.' The exhibition also marked the first time originals of Zeena's visual art were shown together with works of her godfather Kenneth Anger, who died shortly before. The soundtrack was subsequently released as digital download on Bandcamp.
- Bring Me The Head of F.W. Murnau: A Ghost Story in Six Acts, Compact Disc EP 2020 KCH Records, no ASIN

=== Composer/performer for Radio Werewolf ===
- The Vinyl Solution- Analog Artifacts: Ritual Instrumentals and Undercover Versions, Compilation of Radio Werewolf singles and EPs in one CD. World Operations, 2012.
- Love Conquers All CD. Radio Werewolf, Gymnastic Records, 1992. ASIN: B000025TGE
- Witchcraft/Boots Vinyl Double-cover 12-inch Maxi Single. Radio Werewolf, Unclean Production, 1991. ASIN: B001EBDQXM
- Songs for the End of the World CD. Radio Werewolf, Gymnastic Records, 1991. ASIN: B001EB9JFG
- Bring Me the Head of Geraldo Rivera Vinyl Mini LP. Radio Werewolf, Unclean Production, 1990. ASIN: B001EBFUXG
- The Lightning and the Sun, Vinyl Mini LP. Radio Werewolf, Unclean Productions, 1989. ASIN: B000XV7U6I

=== Producer ===
- 5,000 Years of the God Set, 1997 Wolfslair, Inc./2012 Kaliyuga Clearing House, Producer Zeena Schreck, no ASIN
- Christopher Lee Sings Devils, Rogues & Other Villains (From Broadway To Bayreuth And Beyond), 1996 Wolfslair, Inc., Co-Produced with Nikolas and Zeena Schreck, ASIN: B004GL0VRQ
- Charles Manson Superstar (co-producer/narrator), 1989, film documentary, director/producer: Nikolas Schreck)

=== Other recordings ===
- The Higher Unknown, opening track: "These Wounds Never Heal" features co-written lyrics and vocals by Zeena. A Sacred Legion album, released on CD, vinyl LP and as digital download on Bandcamp, 2025 on Bat-Cave Productions.
- All My Sins Remembered – The Sonic Worlds of John Murphy (Live track from WGT 2015 performance; track title "Sethian Dream Oracle"), 3-CD compilation, 2016 The Epicurean
- Georges Montalba – Pipe Organ Favorites & Fantasy in Pipe Organ and Percussion, 2001 Hit Thing, digipack booklet includes an article written by Zeena Schreck with her archival photos, graphics and the last photo together of her and her father, ASIN: B001K2GGTG
- Zeena Speaks on the Death of Anton LaVey, 1998 Wolfslair, Inc./2012 Kaliyuga Clearing House, no ASIN
- X – Zero Track: Hymn To The Great Grand Goat, features vocals by Zeena. Vinyl LP 1998 Musicus Phÿcus, no ASIN
- Zeena provided all the female narration, as well as contributing some of the soundtrack music for the documentary film Charles Manson Superstar, 1989 Video Werewolf.
- Zeena [LaVey] Radio interviews: Three Volume Set, 1989 The Black House, no ASIN

=== Recordings about or inspired by Zeena ===
- I Was Evil (song title), released on 7-inch vinyl by King Dude/AWEN, released Jan 21, 2021. Zeena was the inspiration for this track; Tesco Organisation description, "[King Dude] relays a story told to him by Zeena Schreck (née LaVey) wherein she could have effected some malice but on a whim decided not to, adding ‘but, that was back when I was evil’. That sentence was a springboard for a song idea."
- The Silent Lineage album by Sacred Legion, released December 2020. Both album and band name given by Zeena. From Dark Italia website, "The band's name was chosen for them by Zeena Schreck, counterculture icon, multimedia artist and musician (Radio Werewolf)."
- Two tracks from the EP State and Design, titles: Radio Werewolf and An Anonymous, released April 30, 2018, by Cubus Larvik. Samples of Zeena's voice from interviews used copiously throughout, as well as a still from one of Zeena's interviews used for the cover.
- Zeena LaVey: Satanist (song title), released October 10, 2013, by DENNIS.
- Pentagram Sam, released 2012 by Da Grimston & Mist-E. A Satanic rap parody on T-Rex; references Zeena in lyrics and imagery as status symbol within that milieu, e.g., "I'm Facebook friendz with Zeena LaVey; Pentagram Sam get outta the way."
- The Satanic Mass, 1968 Murgenstrumm Records / re-released on CD, 1994 Amarillo Records / 2001 Mephisto Media. Contains a reenactment of Zeena Schreck's historic satanic baptism. ASIN: B000172L86

== Filmography ==
- REGRETS voice cameo by Zeena in short film premiered June 24, 2023 at Dances With Films film festival, Los Angeles. Director: Alex Badham.
- Satan Lives (interviewed as herself), documentary, 2015. Directors: Sam Dunn and Scott McFadyen, Banger Films.
- Usher (plays Sapphic Poetess), short film based on Edgar Allan Poe's "The Fall of the House of Usher," 2000. Director: Curtis Harrington. Released on Blu-Ray in 2013 by Flicker Alley.
- Speak of the Devil (as herself – uncredited), documentary, 1998. Directors: Nick Bougas and Adam Parfrey/Feral House.
- Showdown with Satanism (as herself), documentary, 1997. Produced by Bob Larson Ministries Video, USA ASIN: B001O0VW98
- You May Be Sitting Next to a Satanist (as herself), documentary, 1997. Directors: Alanté & Antoine Simkine, in French language.
- The Zurich Experiment (performer/producer/director), documentary of live music performance. Produced by Video Werewolf Inc., Vienna, Austria, 1992.
- Germania: The Theory of Ruins, (producer/director/photographer), Documentary-art video. Director: Zeena Schreck, Produced by Video Werewolf Inc., Vienna, Austria, 1992.
- The First Family of Satanism (as herself). Produced by Bob Larson Ministries, USA, 1990.
- Ragnarok, (Producer/director), documentary. Produced by Video Werewolf Inc, 1990.
- Charles Manson Superstar (co-producer/narrator), documentary. Director/producer: Nikolas Schreck, 1989. Zeena was co-producer, provided all the female narration as well as contributing some of the soundtrack music for the film.
- The 80s: Satan's Seed Strikes Back [Alternate title: Zeena vs. Ignorance] documentary; compilation of Zeena's media interviews while spokesperson for the Church of Satan, produced by The Black House, USA, 1989.
- Satanis: The Devil's Mass,(as herself) documentary. Director: Ray Laurent USA, 1968. Something Weird Video. ASIN: B000093NSP
- The Wonderful World of Brother Buzz (as herself) Children's television program, San Francisco, USA, 1965.

== Publications (as author) ==
- The Zaum of Zeena, all art and writings in "The Zaum of Zeena" are her own. Edited by Frank Haines, published by Heinzfeller Nileisist for the New York Art Book Fair, 2015. Currently in its third edition.
- VICE Column for VICE in 2013 by Zeena called "From the Eye of the Storm".
- Beatdom Crime issue #12, Cover photo and theater monologue "Night Shift, Richmond Station", December 20, 2012 ISBN 978-1-4818-0183-6
- Beatdom Nature issue #11, Zeena's autobiographical essay, "Liberation Under the Snow Moon", May 26, 2012 ISBN 978-1-4774-1872-7
- Beatdom Religion issue #10, Zeena wrote two short stories in this issue: "A Short History of Buddhism in Berlin" & "Lost and Found: A Fairy Tale of Sethian Awakening" December 15, 2011 ISBN 978-1-4680-9677-4
- LeDossier Manson, by Nikolas Schreck. Appendix A, is a 53-page full transcript with introduction and annotations by Zeena, from the raw video footage from Nikolas Schreck's interview to his documentary, Charles Manson Superstar. Transcript title: "Easter Monday Audience with the Underworld Pope: Charles Manson Interviewed and Decoded". Jacket design artist/graphic designer and all chapter plates by Zeena Schreck. Camion Noir, 2011
- The Manson File: Myth And Reality Of An Outlaw Shaman, by Nikolas Schreck. Appendix A, is a 53-page transcript by Zeena of the raw video footage from Nikolas Schreck's interview in his documentary, Charles Manson Superstar; includes introduction and annotations to the transcript by Zeena as well. Title: "Easter Monday Audience with the Underworld Pope: Charles Manson Interviewed and Decoded". Jacket design artist/graphic designer and all chapter plates by Zeena Schreck. World Operations, 2011
- Straight to Hell: 20th Century Suicides, Zeena Schreck wrote the Heaven's Gate Chapter, Creation Books, June 30, 2004 ISBN 978-1-84068-090-4
- Schreck, Nikolas; Schreck, Zeena (2002). Demons of the Flesh: The Complete Guide to Left Hand Path Sex Magic. Creation Books. ISBN 1-84068-061-X. Co-authored by Zeena and Nikolas Schreck, deals heavily with the subject of sex magic and the worship of the feminine in Eastern Tantra, pagan ritualism, Christianity, and western occultism.

== Published illustrations and graphic design by Zeena ==
- All My Sins Remembered – The Sonic Worlds of John Murphy, CD booklet cover portrait of John Murphy by Zeena; released by The Epicurean record label, 2016
- The Zaum of Zeena, all art and writings within "The Zaum of Zeena" are her own. Published by Heinzfeller Nileisist for the New York Art Book Fair, 2015
- HORSEFLY, cover art and title design by Zeena, Vinyl 7-inch EP of Charles Manson's music. ATWA/ATWAR Productions, 2011
- The Manson File: Myth and Reality of an Outlaw Shaman, Cover design, artist/graphic designer and all chapter plates by Zeena. World Operations, 2011
- LeDossier Manson, Cover design, artist/graphic designer and all chapter plates by Zeena. Camion Noir, 2011
- Kabbalah, Qliphoth and Goetic Magic, contributed two original photos and two original drawings for this volume. Ajna, 2004
- Demons of the Flesh: The Complete Guide to Left-Hand Path Sex Magic, selection and editing of photos and images, as well as contributed two original drawings created for this volume 2002
- The Exit Collection, two original drawings for this volume. Tacit, 1998
- Love Conquers All, design layout for CD's cover, booklet & inlays; 1992 Radio Werewolf, Gymnastic Records, ASIN: B000025TGE
- Witchcraft/Boots, concept, double cover design & photographic tableau of Nikolas Schreck for Witchcraft side (photo of Zeena for Boots side by Helmut Wolech); Radio Werewolf, Unclean Production, 1991 ASIN: B001EBDQXM
- Songs for the End of the World design & original art for CD's cover, booklet & inlays; Radio Werewolf, Gymnastic Records, 1991 ASIN: B001EB9JFG
- Bring Me the Head of Geraldo Rivera, concept, cover art & design; Radio Werewolf, Unclean Production, 1990 ASIN: B001EBFUXG
- The Lightning and the Sun, cover design & layout; Radio Werewolf, Unclean Productions, 1989 ASIN: B000XV7U6I

== Publication cover stories featuring Zeena ==
- DERAILED Magazine; Issue 4, Vol. 1 – April 2021, Eager Student, Humble Teacher, interview with Zeena Schreck by Daphne Minks Daly. ISSN 2766-6379
- Beatdom; Crime issue #12, Dec. 20, 2012. Cover photo and theater monologue "Night Shift, Richmond Station," by Zeena Schreck. 978-1481801836
- Cuir Underground; Issue 4.2 – Summer 1998 Sado-Magic for Satan, interview with Zeena Schreck by Kiki Scar.
