= Radio Werewolf =

Los Angeles musical group (1984–1993)

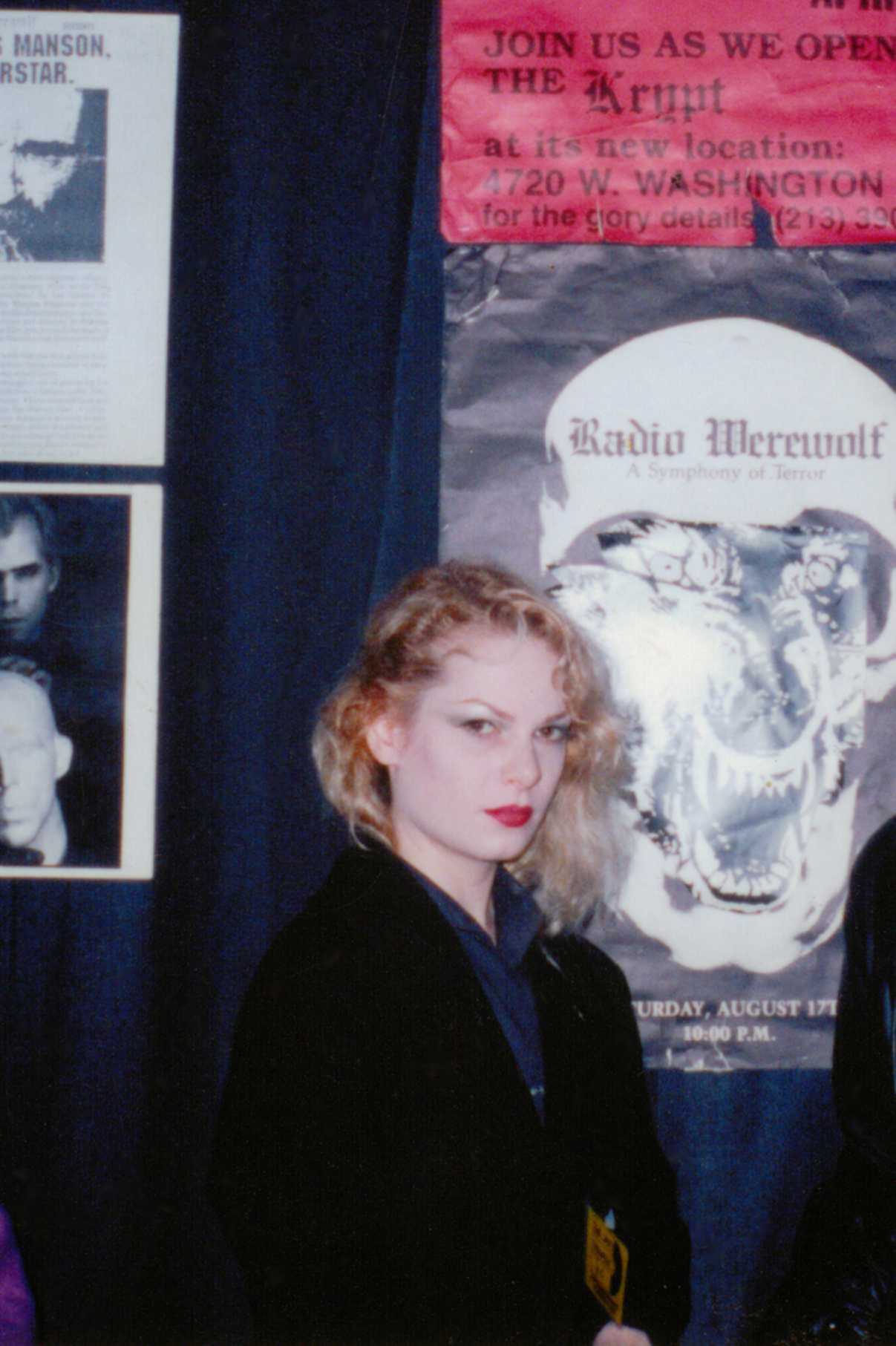
- Radio Werewolf co-director Zeena Schreck at 1989 Berlin Independence Days Music Festival

Background information
- Origin: Los Angeles, California, United States
- Genre: Post-punk
- Years active: 1984-1993
- Past members: Nikolas Schreck; Evil Wilhelm; Paul Antonelli; James Collord; Zeena Schreck

Radio Werewolf was a musical collective active in Los Angeles, California, and Europe from 1984 to 1993.

== History ==
Radio Werewolf was founded in Los Angeles in 1984 by Nikolas Schreck (vocals), Evil Wilhelm (percussion), James "Filth" Collord (bass) and Nathan Pino (hammond organ). When Nathan Pino was asked to leave the band, he was replaced on the keyboard by Paul Antonelli, formerly with the band Animotion. Holding a series of controversial theatrical ritual events billed as Radio Werewolf Youth Rallies at such landmark Sunset Strip venues as The Whisky a Go Go, the Roxy, and Club Lingerie, as well as at Gothic underground clubs The Krypt, The Scream, and Zombie Zoo, the band came to identify as the "Radio Werewolf Youth Party." Radio Werewolf claimed that their sound was part of a musical purist movement, designed to evoke feelings of power and harmony through the use of the "dominant frequency”.

Although this early Radio Werewolf formation recorded many of their signature songs on a 1987 studio album, the only official release of music from these sessions was Buried Alive, on the American Gothic LP compilation released by Bomp! and Gymnastic Records in 1988. The 1988 black comedy film Mortuary Academy featured Radio Werewolf as themselves performing "1960 Cadillac Hearse", another song featured on their first unreleased album.

Radio Werewolf's live performances from 1984 to 1988 in Los Angeles sparked controversy, most notably in their involvement with the Satanist “8/8/88” rally held in San Francisco on August 8, 1988, in collaboration with NON and Schreck's “occult-fascist” Abraxas Foundation. The rally was notable for bringing together Satanist and explicitly neo-Nazi elements; a photo from the event displayed Zeena, Schreck and the neo-Nazi activist Bob Heick giving a Nazi salute. This event marked the first Radio Werewolf collaboration with Zeena Schreck, who appeared in her capacity as High Priestess of the Church of Satan. Evil Wilhelm quit Radio Werewolf shortly after the 8/8/88 Rally, later stating that he felt their music was being misunderstood by Nazi groups.

The lyrical content of their music also sparked controversy, with numerous references to National Socialism, most notably in the song "Triumph of the Will," which was named after a Nazi propaganda film. The song, written and sung from the point of view of an elderly former Nazi reminiscing about Nazi Germany, incorporated such lyrics as "Eva, oh Eva, come sit on my face; Berlin is burning and we are the master race". The band also had a song called "Strength through Joy," named after the Nazi slogan and recreational program. Their cover version of the Nancy Sinatra song "These Boots Were Made for Walking" features the sound of an army marching in the background, as well as Zeena singing a few lines in German. For the Maxi-singles cover, Zeena sported a similar costume as the film character Ilsa, She Wolf of the SS. Schreck claimed in a 2011 interview that this track was a deliberate self-parody of their own public image at the time. Schreck stated that, "Black humor, sarcasm, and irony were always essential to the Radio Werewolf experience."

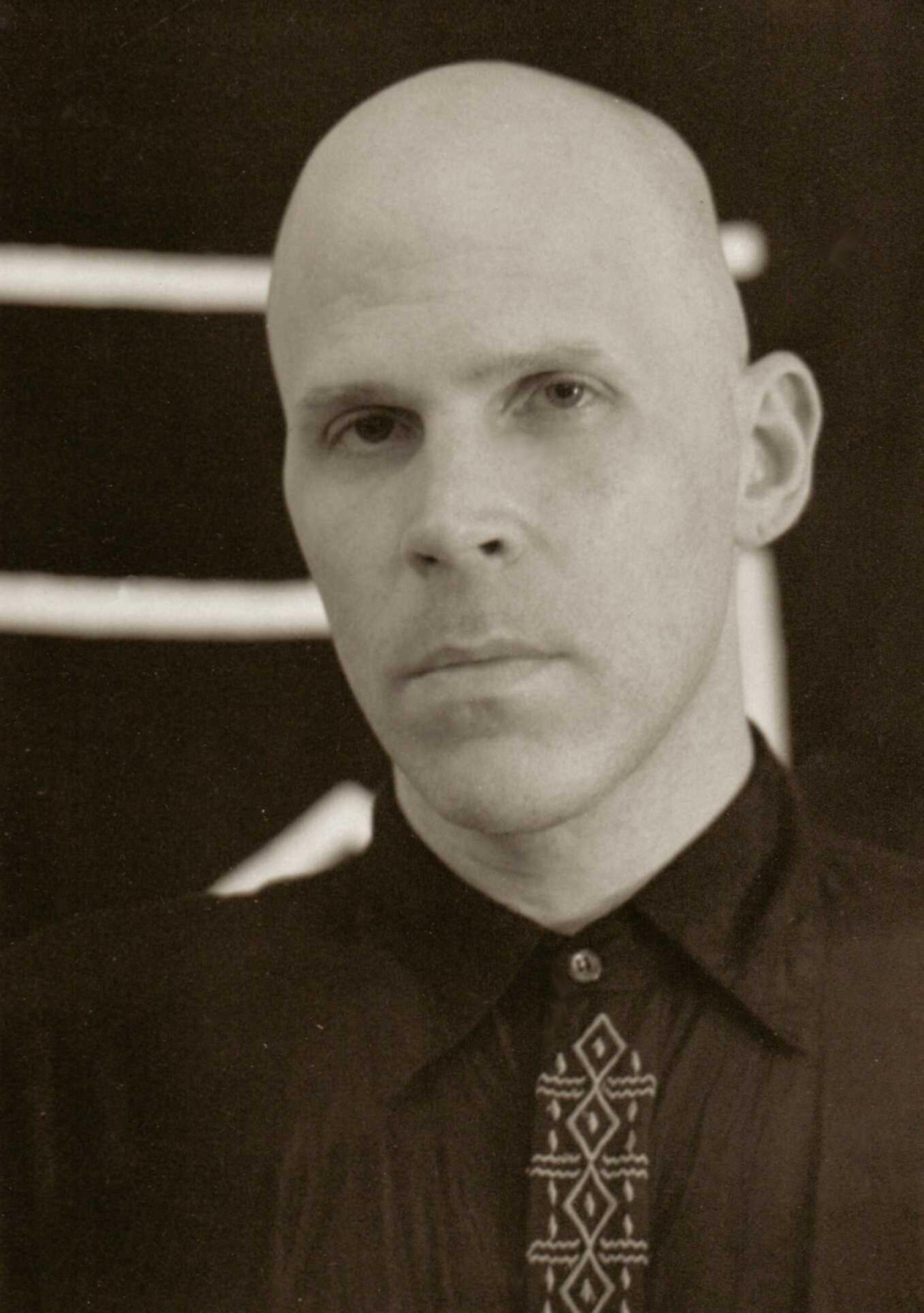
Nikolas Schreck

In the late 1980s, Radio Werewolf was heavily featured on talk shows and in media material, billed as heading a worldwide Satanic movement, and were interviewed variously by investigative journalist Geraldo Rivera, Tom Metzger, Wally George, and others. Songs such as "Pogo the Clown" (about serial killer John Wayne Gacy), "The Night" (about a lovesick vampire), and "Incubus" (about a girl being visited by an Incubus), were pointed to by critics as condoning necrophilia and literal vampirism. Schreck continued Radio Werewolf as a solo project with the release of the 1989 album The Fiery Summons, released by Gymnastic Records of Germany.

In 1989, Nikolas Schreck released a documentary about Charles Manson entitled Charles Manson Superstar under Radio Werewolf's sister label "Video Werewolf." Billed as the only fair interview ever conducted with Manson, the video featured photographs and footage of Spahn Ranch along with interviews of people connected in some way with Manson or movements he has been associated with. Schreck indicated in the documentary that Manson was mostly a misunderstood and misused figure, advocated as evil through a large-scale fabrication by the media. Schreck also provided narration and musical accompaniment on the documentary.

Zeena Schreck's compositions, performance, and graphic design on Radio Werewolf's 1989 ambient ritual music EP The Lightning and the Sun marked her official entry as Radio Werewolf's co-director. She also served as co-director, with Nikolas Schreck, of the Werewolf Order, a magical and ecological initiatory circle which evolved from the earlier Radio Werewolf Youth Party. The subsequent Radio Werewolf recordings, Songs for the End of the World, Bring Me the Head of Geraldo Rivera, Witchcraft-Boots: A Tribute to the Sin-Atras, and Love Conquers All, increasingly covered themes related to the couple's use of sound as a magical tool. From 1990 to 1993, Radio Werewolf toured only in Europe, and were based in Vienna, Austria, where percussionist Christophe D. and viola player Vladimir Rosinski joined the group.

Radio Werewolf's last performance open to the general public was held at Zurich, Switzerland's historic Kaufleute Hall on December 30, 1991, and was billed as The Zurich Experiment. A Video Werewolf project of the same name was released in 1992. Zeena and Nikolas Schreck continued to operate the Werewolf Order until 1999, but ended the Radio Werewolf musical aspect of this activity in 1993.

In 2012, Radio Werewolf's The Vinyl Solution - Analog Artifacts: Ritual Instrumentals and Undercover Versions was released by World Operations. The compact disc, the first official Radio Werewolf release since 1992, compiles newly remastered re-releases of 12 ambient "sonic magic" tracks from rare Radio Werewolf vinyl recordings between 1989 and 1992, as well as two bonus tracks never previously released to the public. In conjunction with the release of The Vinyl Solution - Analog Artifacts: Ritual Instrumentals and Undercover Versions, Zeena, Radio Werewolf's former co-director, composer, performer, graphic designer/art director and She-Wolf from 1988 to 1993, granted a limited number of interviews for its release.

In 2016, Classic Rock magazine ranked Radio Werewolf number 4 on their "25 weirdest bands of all time" list.

In 2019, Amy Haben's article "Subversive Grooves: Music From the Dark Side," for the 25 February edition of online zine Please Kill Me, describes Radio Werewolf and Zeena: "Radio Werewolf is one of the coolest bands you probably never heard of. It's a dark trip on to the set of a vintage horror movie."

== Discography ==
=== Albums ===
Under the Zeena Schreck/Nikolas Schreck collaborative years:

- The Fiery Summons - 1989
- Songs for the End of the World - 1991
- Love Conquers All - 1992
- The Vinyl Solution - Analog Artifacts: Ritual Instrumentals and Undercover Versions - 2012

=== EPs ===
Under the Zeena Schreck/Nikolas Schreck collaborative years:

- The Lightning and the Sun - 1989
- Bring Me the Head of Geraldo Rivera - 1990
- Boots/Witchcraft - 1991

=== Singles ===
Under the Schreck/Wilhelm/Collard/Antonelli collaborative years:

- 1960 Cadillac Hearse - 1984
- Buried Alive (On VA American Gothic) - 1984

=== Unreleased ===
Under the Schreck/Wilhelm/Collord/Antonelli collaborative years:

- The First Official Radio Werewolf Album - 1987

=== Live performances ===
Under the Zeena Schreck/Nikolas Schreck collaborative years:

- Live In Germany - 1990
