= Charles Manson Superstar =

- Videotape cover
- Directed by: Nikolas Schreck
- Produced by: Video Werewolf
- Starring: Charles Manson; Nikolas Schreck
- Narrated by: Nikolas Schreck; Zeena Schreck
- Release date: 1989
- Language: English

Charles Manson Superstar is a documentary film about Charles Manson, directed by Nikolas Schreck in 1989. Most of the documentary (the entire interview) was filmed inside San Quentin Prison. Nikolas and Zeena Schreck narrated the segments while images were shown, and music played in the background. There was brief footage of Spahn Ranch, and a short clip of James Nolan Mason being interviewed about the Universal Order, and Manson. Olivier Messiaen's "Death and Resurrection," Bobby Beausoleil's "Lucifer Rising," Krzysztof Penderecki's "Apocalypsis," Biff Rose's "Fill Your Heart" (Tiny Tim's version) and Anton LaVey's "The Satanic Mass," and Manson's own songs "Clang Bang Clang" and "Mechanical Man" from the album Lie: The Love and Terror Cult, were played during the film.

The artwork for the poster was done by painter Joe Coleman.

== Transcript of raw footage of interview ==
Zeena Schreck's "Easter Monday Audience with the Underworld Pope: Charles Manson Interviewed and Decoded" is Zeena's introduction with her full transcript and annotations of the raw footage of this interview as printed in Nikolas Schreck's 2011 French and English editions of Le Dossier Manson: Mythe Et Réalité D’un Chaman Hors-La-Loi and The Manson File: Myth and Reality of an Outlaw Shaman for Camion Noir/World Operations.
