= James Webb (historian) =

Scottish historian and biographer (1946–1980)

James Charles Napier Webb (13 January 1946 – 9 May 1980) was a Scottish historian and biographer. He was born in Edinburgh, and was educated at Harrow and Trinity College, Cambridge. He is remembered primarily for his books The Harmonious Circle, The Occult Underground (originally titled Flight from Reason), and The Occult Establishment. He has been characterised as "an important pioneer in the academic study of Western esotericism".

== Life and career ==
In 1980 his important biography of G. I. Gurdjieff, titled The Harmonious Circle, was published. He spent 8 years researching the book, making contacts with the Gurdjieff community worldwide. The New York Review of Books described Webb's research and knowledge of the subject as "extremely comprehensive", and Mistlberger described the book as "scholarly and occasionally gossipy" with Webb being "unquestionably a sincere researcher" who became "deeply involved in the matter of his subject" while remaining "fundamentally an outsider, an investigative journalist". Tamdgidi wrote that, amongst all the biographers of Gurdjieff, "only Webb claimed to have been independent and outside the circle of Gurdjieff's followers", and in 2004, in Inventors of Gurdjieff, Paul Beekman Taylor described The Harmonious Circle as "the first systematic biographical account by a writer who hadn't known Gurdjieff personally" Webb established that Gurdjieff's writings revealed substantial evidence of familiarity with the languages and cultures of central Asia, but Webb regarded Gurdjieff more as a self-taught innovator than a member of an esoteric Asiatic group, and, although seeing some of its forms having derived from Asia, saw the content of his teachings deriving from western occult traditions.

Webb's theories of Gurdjieff's identity as a Russian foreign agent in Central Asia, and theories on where he actually travelled before 1917, are considered controversial points in The Harmonious Circle.

Webb's work challenges theories of secularism, theories of decline in organised religion and spirituality. Webb argued that the 19th and 20th centuries had also been marked by a revolt against the Enlightenment, and that the rise of irrationalism was much more marked than the rise of rationalism, especially before, during and after the First World War and the Second World War. Webb traced the influence of occult and mystical groups and writers on literature, philosophy and politics.

Webb was generally ignored in his lifetime, but with the increasing rise of New Age spirituality in later years, his work now seems increasingly prescient. After increasing mental health difficulties, Webb committed suicide in 1980.

His major works The Occult Underground and The Occult Establishment were translated into German and published in 2009 and 2008 respectively.

Trinity College established the "James Webb Prize for the History of Ideas" in his memory.

== Influence ==
Webb's work has been recognised as a precursor to the academic study of esotericism which would later be inaugurated as a formalised field by historians Antoine Faivre and Wouter Hanegraaff in the 1990s.

Historian Nicholas Goodrick-Clarke argued that "By focusing on functional significance of occultism in political irrationalism, Webb rescued the study of Nazi occultism for the history of ideas."

Webb's notion of "rejected knowledge" was influential on Hanegraaff's work.

== Selected works ==
- Flight from Reason (1971) MacDonald & Co., London. ISBN 0-356-03634-0.
  - 2nd ed.: The Occult Underground (1974) Open Court Publishing. ISBN 0-8126-9073-7.
- The Occult Establishment: The Dawn of the New Age and The Occult Establishment (1976) Open Court Publishing. ISBN 0-87548-434-4.
- The Harmonious Circle: The Lives and Work of G. I. Gurdjieff, P.D. Ouspensky, and Their Followers (1980) Putnam Publishing. ISBN 0-399-11465-3.
- Das Zeitalter des Irrationalen: Politik, Kultur und Okkultismus im 20. Jahrhundert (2008) Marix Verlag. ISBN 978-3865391520. German translation of The Occult Establishment.
