= Esotericism =

Esotericism (or esoterism) may refer to any of several very broadly regional spiritual practices characterized by an occult or discrete tradition, including:

- Eastern esotericism
- Western esotericism
  - Outline of Western esotericism
- Esoteric Christianity
- Esoteric Buddhism
  - Chinese Esoteric Buddhism
  - Southern Esoteric Buddhism
  - Vajrayana
- Esoteric interpretation of the Quran
- Batiniyya
- Esoteric neo-Nazism
- Esoteric Hinduism

== See also ==
- Esoteric (disambiguation)
