= Boaz Huss =

- בועז הוס
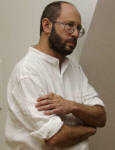
- Born: Jerusalem, Israel
- Occupation: Professor of Kabbalah
- Known for: Chair of the Goldstein-Goren Department of Jewish Thought at Ben-Gurion University of the Negev, leading scholar in contemporary Kabbalah

Boaz Huss (Hebrew: בועז הוס; born 1959) is a professor of Kabbalah at the Goldstein-Goren Department of Jewish Thought at Ben-Gurion University of the Negev. He is a leading scholar in contemporary Kabbalah.

== Early life and education ==
Boaz Huss was born in Jerusalem, Israel. He completed his undergraduate and graduate work at the Hebrew University of Jerusalem, where he earned a B.A. in Philosophy and History of Jewish Thought in 1986 and a Ph.D. in History of Jewish Thought in 1993. His doctoral thesis, Ketem Paz – The Kabbalistic Doctrine of Rabbi Simeon Lavi in His Commentary to the Zohar, was supervised by Professor Moshe Idel.

He was a Fulbright post-doctoral fellow at Yale University (1993/4), a Starr fellow at the Center for Jewish Studies at Harvard University (2002), and a fellow at The Institute for Advanced Studies at The Hebrew University of Jerusalem (1998/9, 2008/9). He lectured at Hebrew University (1994–1996) and Tel Aviv University (1995–1996) before coming to the Goldstein-Goren department of Jewish Thought at Ben-Gurion University; he has chaired the department in 2010–2012. He has received several research grants, including two 4-year grants from the Israel Science Foundation on the subjects of "Major Trends in 20th Century Kabbalah" (2005) and "Kabbalah and the Theosophical Society (1875-1936)".

Huss is a board member of the European Society for the Study of Western Esotericism, and has served on the editorial boards of the Zohar Education Project in Chicago and the International Journal for the Study of New Religions.

== Scholarship ==
Huss' research interests cover the Zohar and its reception, modern and contemporary Kabbalah, Western esotericism, and the New Age. His first monograph was dedicated to the Kabbalah of Rabbi Shimon Lavi, one of the first commentators of the Zohar. In his second monograph he examined the reception of the Zohar and the construction of its symbolic value. Huss was one of the first scholars to "take seriously more contemporary expressions of Jewish mysticism that have been largely ignored by scholars".

He has written about the communist Kabbalah of Rabbi Yehuda Ashlag, about Kabbalistic motifs used by Madonna, and about the New Age and postmodern characteristic of contemporary Kabbalah. Huss also studied the history of Kabbalah research, and criticized the use of the term "mysticism" as the defining category of Kabbalah and Hasidism, and the theological framework of the academic study of Jewish mysticism. He is widely quoted in contemporary Kabbalah literature.

In 2006 he appeared as himself in the TV movie "Decoding the Past: Secrets of Kabbalah", together with other Kabbalah scholars such as Michael Berg, Pinchas Giller, Moshe Idel, Daniel C. Matt, Ronit Meroz, and Byron Sherwin.

== Selected bibliography ==
- The Zohar: Reception and impact. Littman. October 2015. ISBN 978-1-904113-96-6.
- Kabbalah and Contemporary Spiritual Revival. Beer Sheva: Ben-Gurion University Press. 2011. ISBN 9789655360431.
- Kabbalah and Modernity: Interpretations, Transformations, Adaptations. Brill. 2010. ISBN 978-9004182844. (ed. with Marco Pasi, Kocku von Stuckrad)
- Like the Radiance of the Sky: Chapters in the reception history of the Zohar and the construction of its symbolic value. Jerusalem: Bialik Press & Ben Zvi Institute. 2008. Archived from the original on 2013-10-09.
- Sockets of Fine Gold: The Kabbalah of R. Shimo'n Ibn Lavi. Jerusalem: Magnes Press & Ben-Zvi Institute. 2000.
