= Outline of Western esotericism =

Overview and topical guide to Western esotericism

Western esotericism, also known as esotericism, esoterism, and sometimes the Western mystery tradition, is a term scholars use to classify a wide range of loosely related ideas and movements that developed within Western society. These ideas and currents are united since they are largely distinct both from orthodox Judeo-Christian religion and Age of Enlightenment rationalism. It has influenced, or contributed to, various forms of Western philosophy, mysticism, religion, pseudoscience, art, literature, and music.

Western esotericism is a religious movement that is theological, social, politics or philosophical interpretations of religion not represented or controlled by a specific organisation, sect or denomination.

== Common beliefs in Western esotericism ==
- Perennialism - The idea that all religions are part of one single universal truth

== Scholarship ==
=== Organisations and societies ===
- European Society for the Study of Western Esotericism - Scholarly society in Europe

=== Journals ===
- Aries - Peer-reviewed academic journal published by Brill Academic Publishing on behalf of the European Society for the Study of Western Esotericism
- Magic, Ritual, and Witchcraft - Peer-reviewed academic journal published by the University of Pennsylvania Press and released triannually

== Religions and movements of Western esotericism ==
- Bogomilism - 10th century neo-Gnostic sect of Christianity
- Catharism - 12th to 14th century quasi-dualist and pseudo-Gnostic sect of Christianity
- Christian Kabbalah - Christian sect based on the Jewish Kabbalah
- Christian theosophy - An esoteric religious movement that has elements of Christianity and Judaism
- Esoteric Christianity - Mystic and esoteric sects of Christianity
- Gnosticism - Jewish and early Christian sect that believes in the existence of an evil demiurge who made the material universe
- Hermeticism - Religion based around the teachings of Hermes Trismegistus, a syncretic figure combining elements of the Greek god, Hermes and the Egyptian god, Thoth
- Hermetic Qabalah - Western esoteric religion involving mysticism and the occult that is based on the Jewish Kabbalah
- Illuminism - A late 18th and early 19th century syncretic religion based on Gnosticism, Neoplatonism, Swedenborgianism and eastern religions.
- Kabbalah - A type of Jewish mysticism
- Neoplatonism - Religion based on Platonic philosophy and ancient Greek paganism
- Neopaganism - A group of religions based on pre-christian pagan and native religions
- New Age - Western esoteric religious movement based on occultism, Spiritualism, New Thought and Theosophy that grew rapidly in 1970s and was started due to the counterculture of the 1960s
- New Thought - 19th century religious movement in the United States that combined elements of ancient Greek, Roman, Chinese, Taoist, Hindu, Buddhist and ancient Egyptian religions and philosophies
- Occult - Esoteric and supernatural beliefs outside of organised religion
- Proto-Gnosticism - Christian religious movements similar to Gnosticism that existed in the first few centuries of Christianity
- Pythagoreanism - Philosophy based on the teachings and beliefs of the 6th century BCE philosopher and polymath, Pythagoras
- Thelema - An early 20th century religious movement founded by British occultist, Aleister Crowley
