= Esoteric =

Esoteric may refer to:

== Beliefs ==
- Esotericism
- Eastern esotericism
- Western esotericism
  - Outline of Western esotericism
- Esoteric Christianity
- Vajrayana, Esoteric Buddhism
  - Chinese Esoteric Buddhism
- Esoteric interpretation of the Quran
- Esoteric neo-Nazism
- Esoteric Hinduism

== Music ==
- Esoteric (album), 2009, by Skyfire
- Esoteric (band), an English funeral doom band
- Esoteric (rapper) (born 1978), American rapper
- The Esoteric, an American metalcore band
- Esoteric Recordings, a British independent record label
  - Al Haig Trio (Esoteric), a 1954 album, on the Esoteric label, by Al Haig; it is sometimes referred to (in a clear enough context) simply as Esoteric
- The Esoterics, an American choir

== Other uses ==
- Esoteric programming language, an experimental programming language not intended for serious use; in a clear enough context, it might be referred to as an esoteric
- Esoterica (medication), an ointment

== See also ==
- Esoterik (born 1980), Australian rapper
- Esotericism (disambiguation)
- Exoteric, opposite of esoteric
