= Aries (journal) =

- Discipline: Academic study of Western esotericism, religious studies
- Language: English
- Edited by: Egil Asprem

Publication details
- History: 2001–present
- Publisher: Brill Academic Publishers on behalf of the European Society for the Study of Western Esotericism
- Frequency: Biannually

Standard abbreviations
- ISO 4: Aries

Indexing
- ISSN: 1567-9896 (print); 1570-0593 (web)
- OCLC no.: 768086463

Links
- Journal homepage; Online access

Aries: Journal for the Study of Western Esotericism is a peer-reviewed academic journal covering the academic and historical study of Western esotericism. It is published by Brill Academic Publishers on behalf of the European Society for the Study of Western Esotericism. Two issues are published annually; in recent years the first one is a special issue, devoted to a specific theme proposed by a guest editor.

== History ==
A predecessor to the journal was founded in 1983 by Antoine Faivre and Roland Edighoffer under the title ARIES. This name was an acronym of "Association pour la Recherche et l'Information sur l'Ésotérisme, transl. Association for Research and Information on Esotericism.

In 2001, this journal was relaunched under its current title with Brill. From 2001 to 2010, the editor-in-chief was Wouter Hanegraaff. The current editor-in-chief is Egil Asprem. Since 2006, Brill also publishes the affiliated Aries Book Series: Texts and Studies in Western Esotericism, edited by Wouter J. Hanegraaff.

Scholar Henrik Bogdan noted it as of "special importance" of the several academic journals devoted to western esotericism.

== See also ==
- Magic, Ritual, and Witchcraft
- The Pomegranate: The International Journal of Pagan Studies
