= European Society for the Study of Western Esotericism =

Scholarly society in Europe

The European Society for the Study of Western Esotericism (ESSWE) is Europe's only scholarly society for the study of Western esotericism. Founded in 2002, the society promotes academic study of Western esotericism in its various manifestations from late antiquity to the present, and works to secure the future development of the field.

== Publications ==
The peer-reviewed journal Aries, and the associated Aries book series are published by Brill under the auspices of the ESSWE. Aries was published in a first series by La Table d'Emeraude from 1985 to 1999, before a second series began to be published by Brill in 2001. The Aries book series was launched in 2006. The society also publishes a periodic Newsletter.

Between 2016 and 2018, the ESSWE funded the hosting and database costs of the journal Correspondences: Journal for the Study of Esotericism.

== International conferences ==
The ESSWE holds an international conference in a different European country every two years, and holds a workshop for graduate students in years in which there is no conference. Past conferences have been in Tübingen (2007), Strasbourg and Messina (2009), Szeged (2011), Gothenburg (2013), Riga (2015), Erfurt (2017), and Amsterdam (2019).

1st: July 2007, University of Tübingen, "Constructing Tradition: Means and Myths of Transmission in Western Esotericism."

2nd: July 2009, University of Strasbourg, "Capitals of European Esotericism and Transcultural Dialogue."

3rd: July 2011, University of Szeged, "Lux in Tenebris: The Visual and the Symbolic in Western Esotericism"

4th: June 2013, University of Gothenburg, "Western Esotericism and Health."

5th: April 2015, University of Latvia, "Western Esotericism and the East."

6th: June 2017, University of Erfurt, "Western Esotericism and Deviance."

7th: July 2019, University of Amsterdam, "Western Esotericism and Consciousness: Visions, Voices, Altered States."

== Other activities ==
The ESSWE provides various resources on its website, awards prizes and travel bursaries to recognize and encourage younger scholars. It has three regional networks, the Scandinavian Network for the Academic Study of Western Esotericism (SNASWE), the Israeli Network for the Study of Western Esotericsm (INASWE), and the Irish Network for the Study of Esotericism and Paganism (INSEP) and two thematic research networks, the Contemporary Esotericism Research Network (ContERN) and the ESSWE Network for the Study of Esotericism in Antiquity (NSEA).

== Relationships ==
The ESSWE is an affiliated society of the Project AWE (Aesthetics of Western Esotericism), International Association for the History of Religions (IAHR), and a related scholarly organization of the American Academy of Religion (AAR).

In 2014, a related Central and Eastern European Network for the Academic Study of Western Esotericism (CEENASWE) was founded at the Central European University, Budapest.

== Current officers ==
- President: Andreas Kilcher (Eidgenössische Technische Hochschule Zürich, Switzerland)
- Vice President: Boaz Huss (Ben Gurion University of the Negev, Israel)
- Secretary: Mark Sedgwick (University of Aarhus, Denmark)
- Treasurer and Membership Secretary: Egil Asprem (Stockholm University, Sweden)
- Webmaster: Peter J. Forshaw (University of Amsterdam, the Netherlands)
- Henrik Bogdan (University of Gothenburg, Sweden)
- Jean-Pierre Brach (Ecole Pratique des Hautes Etudes, Sorbonne, Paris, France)
- Wouter J. Hanegraaff (University of Amsterdam, the Netherlands)
- Birgit Menzel (Universität Mainz, Germany)
- Sophie Page (University College, London)
- Marco Pasi (University of Amsterdam, the Netherlands)
- György E. Szőnyi (University of Szeged, Hungary)
- Helmut Zander (Ruhr-Universität, Bochum, Germany)

== Notable past officers ==
- Antoine Faivre (University of the Sorbonne, France)
- Nicholas Goodrick-Clarke (University of Exeter, UK)

== Bibliography ==
=== Aries Book Series: Texts and Studies in Western Esotericism ===
- Poller, Jake (2019). Aldous Huxley and alternative spirituality. Texts and Studies in Western Esotericism 27. Leiden: Brill. ISBN 978-90-04-40690-2. OCLC 1122822112.
- Weeks, Andrew; Penman, Leigh (2019). De tribus principiis, oder Beschreibung der Drey Principien Göttliches Wesens: Of the Three Principles of Divine Being, 1619, by Jacob Boehme. Texts and Studies in Western Esotericism 26. Leiden: Brill. ISBN 978-90-04-39527-5. OCLC 1090800283.
- Andersson, Bo; Martin, Lucinda; Penman, Leigh; Weeks, Andrew, eds. (2018). Jacob Böhme and his world. Texts and Studies in Western Esotericism 25. Brill: Brill. ISBN 978-90-04-38509-2. OCLC 1057741122.
- Roukema, Aren (2018). Esotericism and narrative: the occult fiction of Charles Williams. Texts and Studies in Western Esotericism 24. Leiden: Brill. ISBN 978-90-04-36911-5. OCLC 1043913882.
- Forshaw, Peter J., ed. (2016). Lux in Tenebris: the Visual and the Symbolic in Western Esotericism. Texts and Studies in Western Esotericism 23. Leiden: Brill. ISBN 978-90-04-33495-3. OCLC 961266854.
- Meir, Jonatan (2016). Kabbalistic circles in Jerusalem (1896-1948). Texts and Studies in Western Esotericism 22. Leiden: Brill. ISBN 978-90-04-32164-9. OCLC 952227048.
- Introvigne, Massimo (2016). Satanism: A Social History. Texts and Studies in Western Esotericism 21. Leiden: Brill. ISBN 978-90-04-24496-2. OCLC 951833458.
- Petsche, Johanna J. M. (2015). Gurdjieff and music: the Gurdjieff/de Hartmann piano music and its esoteric significance. Texts and Studies in Western Esotericism 20. Leiden: Brill. ISBN 978-90-04-28444-9. OCLC 903489112.
- Finley, Stephen; Guillory, Margarita; Page (Jr.), Hugh, eds. (2014). Esotericism in African American religious experience: "there is a mystery" ... Texts and Studies in Western Esotericism 19. Boston: Brill. ISBN 978-90-04-28342-8. OCLC 895256983.
- Granholm, Kennet (2016). Dark enlightenment: the historical, sociological, and discursive contexts of contemporary esoteric magic. Texts and Studies in Western Esotericism 18. Boston: Brill. ISBN 978-90-04-27487-7. OCLC 886942426.
- Staudenmaier, Peter (2014). Between occultism and Nazism: anthroposophy and the politics of race in the fascist era. Texts and Studies in Western Esotericism 17. Leiden: Brill. ISBN 978-90-04-27015-2. OCLC 878108930.
- Böhme, Jakob, 1575-1624. (2013). Weeks, Andrew (ed.). Aurora (Morgen Röte im auffgang, 1612) and ein grundlicher Bericht or a fundamental report (mysterium pansophicum, 1620). Texts and Studies in Western Esotericism 16. Leiden: Brill. ISBN 978-90-04-22568-8. OCLC 874838531.
- Spector, Sheila A., ed. (2012). Francis Mercury van Helmont's "Sketch of Christian Kabbalism". Texts and Studies in Western Esotericism 15. Leiden: Brill. ISBN 978-90-04-22724-8. OCLC 795120525.
- Collis, Robert (2012). The Petrine instauration: religion, esotericism and science at the court of Peter the Great, 1689-1725. Texts and Studies in Western Esotericism 14. Leiden: Brill. ISBN 978-90-04-22439-1. OCLC 773799270.
- Snoek, Joannes Augustinus Maria (2011). Initiating women in Freemasonry: the adoption rite. Texts and Studies in Western Esotericism 13. Leiden: Brill. ISBN 978-90-04-21934-2. OCLC 769927262.
- Fletcher, John Edward. (2011). A study of the life and works of Athanasius Kircher, "Germanus incredibilis": with a selection of his unpublished correspondence and an annotated translation of his autobiography. Texts and Studies in Western Esotericism 12. Leiden: Brill. ISBN 978-90-04-21632-7. OCLC 763156013.
- Kilcher, Andreas (2010). Constructing tradition: means and myths of transmission in Western esotericism. Texts and Studies in Western Esotericism 11. Leiden: Brill. ISBN 978-90-04-21637-2. OCLC 741613214.
- Huss, Boaz, ed. (2010). Kabbalah and modernity: interpretations, transformations, adaptations. Texts and Studies in Western Esotericism 10. Leiden: Brill. ISBN 978-90-04-18287-5. OCLC 695990132.
- Wuidar, Laurence, ed. (2010). Music and esotericism. Texts and Studies in Western Esotericism 9. Leiden: Brill. ISBN 978-90-04-18279-0. OCLC 695988825.
- Heidle, Alexandra; Snoek, Joannes Augustinus Maria (2008). Women's agency and rituals in mixed and female Masonic orders. Texts and Studies in Western Esotericism 8. Leiden: Brill. ISBN 978-90-474-2586-1. OCLC 593295789.
- Hanegraaff, Wouter J.; Kripal, Jeffrey J. (2008). Hidden intercourse: eros and sexuality in the history of Western esotericism. Texts and Studies in Western Esotericism 7. Leiden: Brill. ISBN 978-90-474-4358-2. OCLC 606928952.
- Hammer, Olav; Stuckrad, Kocku von (2007). Polemical encounters: esoteric discourse and its others. Texts and Studies in Western Esotericism 6. Leiden: Brill. ISBN 978-90-474-3151-0. OCLC 592756287.
- Weeks, Andrew (2008). Paracelsus (Theophrastus Bombastus von Hohenheim, 1493-1541): essential theoretical writings. Texts and Studies in Western Esotericism 5. Leiden: Brill. ISBN 978-90-474-2341-6. OCLC 304398304.
- Geffarth, Renko D. (2007). Religion und arkane Hierarchie: der Orden der Gold- und Rosenkreuzer als geheime Kirche im 18. Jahrhundert. Texts and Studies in Western Esotericism 4. Leiden: Brill. ISBN 978-90-474-1951-8. OCLC 306693917.
- Helmont, Franciscus Mercurius van, 1614-1699. (2007). Coudert, Allison P.; Corse, Taylor (eds.). The alphabet of nature. Texts and Studies in Western Esotericism 3. Leiden: Brill. ISBN 978-90-474-1998-3. OCLC 505105226.
- Barnes, Katherine. (2006). The higher self in Christopher Brennan's Poems: esotericism, romanticism, symbolism. Texts and Studies in Western Esotericism 2. Leiden: Brill. ISBN 978-90-474-1007-2. OCLC 614537868.
- Szulakowska, Urszula (2006). The sacrificial body and the day of doom: alchemy and apocalyptic discourse in the Protestant Reformation. Texts and Studies in Western Esotericism 1. Leiden: Brill. ISBN 978-1-4356-5759-5. OCLC 319492616.
