= Inner path =

"Inner path" in spirituality and related topics may refer to

- Involution (philosophy)
- Introspection
- Mysticism
- Esotericism (disambiguation)
