= Batiniyya =

Allegoric type of scriptural interpretation in Shi'i Islam

Batiniyya (Arabic: باطنية, romanized: Bāṭiniyyah) refers to groups that distinguish between an outer, exoteric (zāhir) and an inner, esoteric (bāṭin) meaning in Islamic scriptures.

== Ismaili Batiniyya ==
The term has been used in particular for an allegoristic type of scriptural interpretation developed among early Ismaili Shia groups, stressing the bāṭin meaning of texts. It has been retained by all branches of Isma'ilism and various Druze groups as well. The Alawites practice a similar system of interpretation. Batiniyya is a common epithet used to designate Isma'ili Islam, which has been accepted by Ismai'lis themselves.

Sunni writers have used the term batiniyya polemically in reference to rejection of the evident meaning of scripture in favor of its bāṭin meaning. Al-Ghazali, a medieval Sunni theologian, used the term batiniyya pejoratively for the adherents of Isma'ilism. Some Shia writers have also used the term polemically.

== Sufi Batinyya ==
When the Islamic world of the Fatimid dynasty entered an Ismaili age in the 10th century, Batinyya became less practiced. As Ismailism turned into political conflicts, the Ayyubid Kurds began their de-Ismailization of Upper Mesopotamia and beyond, reversing the Fatimid forced Ismailization policies. The Kurdish core of the Ayubid empire itself reverted to Sufi Sunni Islam and appropriated the Batini Ismaili beliefs into Sufi Islam.

== See also ==
- Batin (Islam)
- Esoteric interpretation of the Quran
- Yarsanism
