= Magic, Ritual, and Witchcraft =

- Discipline: Western esotericism studies
- Language: English
- Edited by: Claire Fanger, Michael Ostling

Publication details
- History: 2006-present
- Publisher: The University of Pennsylvania Press (United States)
- Frequency: Biannually

Standard abbreviations
- ISO 4: Magic Ritual Witch.

Indexing
- ISSN: 1556-8547 (print); 1940-5111 (web)
- LCCN: 2005214953
- OCLC no.: 60848832

Links
- Journal homepage

Magic, Ritual, and Witchcraft is a peer-reviewed academic journal that focuses on magic scholarship. It is published triannually (spring, summer, winter) by the University of Pennsylvania Press. The founding editors were Michael Bailey (Iowa State University) and Brian Copenhaver (UCLA). As of 2015, the editors-in-chief are Claire Fanger (Rice University) and Michael Ostling (Arizona State University). The journal is available online through Project MUSE.

The publication is affiliated with Societas Magicas, an organization of scholars interested in magic.

== See also ==
- Aries: Journal for the Study of Western Esotericism
- The Pomegranate: The International Journal of Pagan Studies
