= Occult =

Knowledge of the hidden or the paranormal

The occult (from Latin occultus 'hidden, secret') is a category of esoteric or supernatural beliefs and practices which generally fall outside the scope of organized religion and science, encompassing phenomena involving a 'hidden' or 'secret' agency, such as magic and mysticism. It can also refer to paranormal ideas such as extra-sensory perception and parapsychology.

The term occult sciences was used in 16th-century Europe to refer to astrology, alchemy, and natural magic. The term occultism emerged in 19th-century France, among figures such as Antoine Court de Gébelin. It came to be associated with various French esoteric groups connected to Éliphas Lévi and Papus, and in 1875 was introduced into the English language by the esotericist Helena Blavatsky.

Throughout the 20th century, the term 'occult' was used idiosyncratically by a range of different authors. By the 21st century the term 'occultism' was commonly employed –including by academic scholars in the field of Western esotericism studies– to refer to a range of esoteric currents that developed in the mid-19th century and their descendants. Occultism is thus often used to categorise such esoteric traditions as Qabalah, Spiritualism, Theosophy, Anthroposophy, Wicca, the Hermetic Order of the Golden Dawn, New Age, Thelema and the left-hand path and right-hand path.

While Rosicrucianism is not directly 'occult', various Christian Rosicrucian societies have also engaged in esoteric study and are historically adjacent; for example, the Societas Rosicruciana in Anglia and its members influenced the foundation of the Hermetic Order of the Golden Dawn.

Use of the term as a nominalized adjective ('the occult') has developed especially since the late twentieth century. In that same period, occult and culture were combined to form the neologism occulture.

== Etymology ==
The occult (from the Latin word occultus; lit. 'clandestine', 'hidden', or 'secret') is "knowledge of the hidden". In common usage, occult refers to "knowledge of the paranormal", as opposed to "knowledge of the measurable", which is usually referred to as science. The terms esoteric and arcane can also be used to describe the occult, in addition to their meanings unrelated to the supernatural. The term occult sciences was used in the 16th century to refer to astrology, alchemy, and natural magic.

The earliest known usage of the term occultism is in the French language, as "l'occultism". In this form it appears in Aymon de Lestrange's article that was published in Dictionnaire des mots nouveaux (Dictionary of New Words) by Jean-Baptiste Richard de Radonvilliers in 1842. However, it was not related, at this point, to the notion of Ésotérisme chrétien, as has been claimed by Hanegraaff, but to describe a political "system of occulticity" that was directed against priests and aristocrats.

In 1853, the Masonic author Jean-Marie Ragon had already used occultisme in his popular work Maçonnerie occulte, relating it to earlier practices that, since the Renaissance, had been termed "occult sciences" or "occult philosophy", but also to the recent socialist teachings of Charles Fourier. The French esotericist Éliphas Lévi then used the term in his influential book on ritual magic Dogme et rituel de la haute magie, first published in 1856. Lévi was familiar with that work and might have borrowed the term from there. In any case, Lévi also claimed to be a representative of an older tradition of occult science or occult philosophy. It was from his usage of the term occultisme that it gained wider usage; according to Faivre, Lévi was "the principal exponent of esotericism in Europe and the United States" at that time. The term occultism emerged in 19th-century France, where it came to be associated with various esoteric groups connected to Éliphas Lévi and Papus.

The earliest use of the term occultism in the English language appears to be in "A Few Questions to 'Hiraf'", an 1875 article by Helena Blavatsky, a Russian émigré living in the United States who founded the religion of Theosophy. The article was published in the American Spiritualist magazine Spiritual Scientist.

Various twentieth-century writers on the subject used the term occultism in different ways. Some writers, such as the German philosopher Theodor W. Adorno in his Theses Against Occultism, employed the term as a broad synonym for irrationality. In his 1950 book L'occultisme, Robert Amadou used the term as a synonym for esotericism, an approach that the later scholar of esotericism Marco Pasi suggested left the term superfluous. Unlike Amadou, other writers saw occultism and esotericism as different, albeit related, phenomena. In the 1970s, the sociologist Edward A. Tiryakian distinguished between occultism, which he used in reference to practices, techniques, and procedures, and esotericism, which he defined as the religious or philosophical belief systems on which such practices are based. This division was initially adopted by the early academic scholar of esotericism, Antoine Faivre, although he later abandoned it; it has been rejected by most scholars who study esotericism.

By the 21st century the term was commonly employed—including by academic scholars of esotericism—to refer to a range of esoteric currents that developed in the mid-19th century and their descendants. Occultism is thus often used to categorise such esoteric traditions as Spiritualism, Theosophy, Anthroposophy, the Hermetic Order of the Golden Dawn, and the New Age movement.

A different division was used by the Traditionalist author René Guénon, who used esotericism to describe what he believed was the Traditionalist, inner teaching at the heart of most religions, while occultism was used pejoratively to describe new religions and movements that he disapproved of, such as Spiritualism, Theosophy, and various secret societies. Guénon's use of this terminology was adopted by later writers like Serge Hutin and Luc Benoist. As noted by Hanegraaff, Guénon's use of these terms are rooted in his Traditionalist beliefs and "cannot be accepted as scholarly valid".

The term occultism derives from the older term occult, much as the term esotericism derives from the older term esoteric. However, the historian of esotericism Wouter Hanegraaff stated that it was important to distinguish between the meanings of the term occult and occultism. Occultism is not a homogenous movement and is widely diverse.

Over the course of its history, the term occultism has been used in various different ways. However, in contemporary uses, occultism commonly refers to forms of esotericism that developed in the nineteenth century and their twentieth-century derivations. In a descriptive sense, it has been used to describe forms of esotericism which developed in nineteenth-century France, especially in the Neo-Martinist environment. According to the historian of esotericism Antoine Faivre, it is with the esotericist Éliphas Lévi that "the occultist current properly so-called" first appears. Other prominent French esotericists involved in developing occultism included Papus, Stanislas de Guaita, Joséphin Péladan, Georges-Albert Puyou de Pouvourville, and Jean Bricaud.

== Occult sciences ==
The idea of occult sciences developed in the sixteenth century. The term usually encompassed three practices—astrology, alchemy, and natural magic—although sometimes various forms of divination were also included rather than being subsumed under natural magic. These were grouped together because, according to the Dutch scholar of hermeticism Wouter Hanegraaff, "each one of them engaged in a systematic investigation of nature and natural processes, in the context of theoretical frameworks that relied heavily on a belief in occult qualities, virtues or forces." Although there are areas of overlap between these different occult sciences, they are separate, and in some cases practitioners of one would reject the others as being illegitimate.

During the Age of Enlightenment, occultism increasingly came to be seen as intrinsically incompatible with the concept of science. From that point on, use of "occult science(s)" implied a conscious polemic against mainstream science. Nevertheless, the philosopher and card game historian Michael Dummett, whose analysis of the historical evidence suggested that fortune-telling and occult interpretations using cards were unknown before the 18th century, said that the term occult science was not misplaced because "people who believe in the possibility of unveiling the future or of exercising supernormal powers do so because the efficacy of the methods they employ coheres with some systematic conception which they hold of the way the universe functions...however flimsy its empirical basis."

In his 1871 book Primitive Culture, the anthropologist Edward Tylor used the term "occult science" as a synonym for magic.

== Occult qualities ==
Occult qualities are properties that have no known rational explanation; in the Middle Ages, for example, magnetism was considered an occult quality. Aether is another such element. Isaac Newton's contemporaries severely criticized his theory that gravity was effected through "action at a distance", as occult.

== Occultism ==
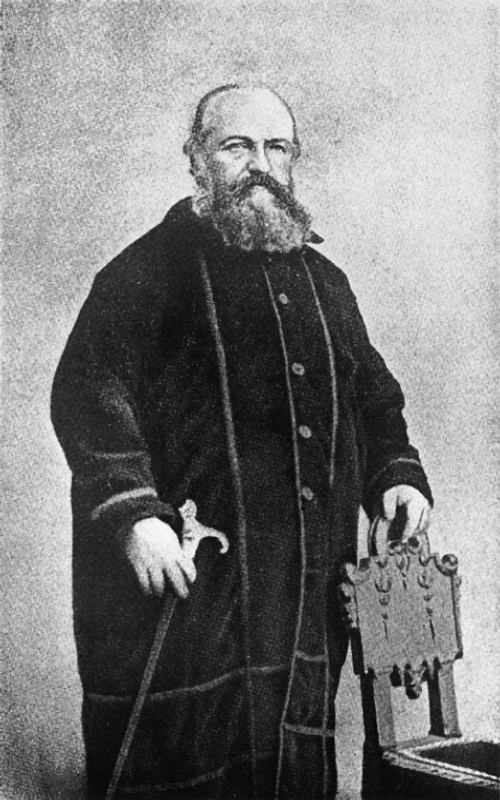
The French esotericist Éliphas Lévi popularised the term "occultism" in the 1850s. His reinterpretation of traditional esoteric ideas has led to him being called the origin of "the occultist current properly so-called".

In the English-speaking world, notable figures in the development of occultism included Helena Blavatsky and other figures associated with her Theosophical Society, senior figures in the Hermetic Order of the Golden Dawn like William Wynn Westcott and Samuel Liddell MacGregor Mathers, as well as other individuals such as Paschal Beverly Randolph, Emma Hardinge Britten, Arthur Edward Waite, and – in the early twentieth century – Aleister Crowley, Dion Fortune, and Israel Regardie. By the end of the nineteenth century, occultist ideas had also spread into other parts of Europe, such as the German Empire, Austria-Hungary, and the Kingdom of Italy.

Unlike older forms of esotericism, occultism does not necessarily reject "scientific progress or modernity". Lévi had stressed the need to solve the conflict between science and religion, something that he believed could be achieved by turning to what he thought was the ancient wisdom found in magic. The French scholar of Western esotericism Antoine Faivre noted that rather than outright accepting "the triumph of scientism", occultists sought "an alternative solution", trying to integrate "scientific progress or modernity" with "a global vision that will serve to make the vacuousness of materialism more apparent". The Dutch scholar of hermeticism Wouter Hanegraaff remarked that occultism was "essentially an attempt to adapt esotericism" to the "disenchanted world", a post-Enlightenment society in which growing scientific discovery had eradicated the "dimension of irreducible mystery" previously present. In doing so, he noted, occultism distanced itself from the "traditional esotericism" which accepted the premise of an "enchanted" world. According to the British historian of Western esotericism Nicholas Goodrick-Clarke, occultist groups typically seek "proofs and demonstrations by recourse to scientific tests or terminology".

In his work about Lévi, the German historian of religion Julian Strube has argued that the occultist wish for a "synthesis" of religion, science, and philosophy directly resulted from the context of contemporary socialism and progressive Catholicism. Similar to spiritualism, but in declared opposition to it, the emergence of occultism should thus be seen within the context of radical social reform, which was often concerned with establishing new forms of "scientific religion" while at the same time propagating the revival of an ancient tradition of "true religion". Indeed, the emergence of both modern esotericism and socialism in July Monarchy France have been inherently intertwined.

Another feature of occultists is that—unlike earlier esotericists—they often openly distanced themselves from Christianity, in some cases (like that of Aleister Crowley) even adopting explicitly anti-Christian stances. This reflected how pervasive the influence of secularisation had been on all areas of European society. In rejecting Christianity, these occultists sometimes turned to pre-Christian belief systems and embraced forms of Modern Paganism, while others drew on Asian religions, such as Hinduism and Buddhism. In various cases, certain occultists did both. Another characteristic of these occultists was their emphasis on "the spiritual realization of the individual", an idea that would strongly influence the twentieth-century New Age and the Human Potential Movement. This spiritual realization was encouraged both through traditional Western 'occult sciences' like alchemy and ceremonial magic, but by the start of the twentieth century had also begun to include practices drawn from non-Western contexts, such as yoga.

Although occultism is distinguished from earlier forms of esotericism, many occultists have also been involved in older esoteric currents. For instance, occultists like François-Charles Barlet and Rudolf Steiner were also theosophers, (Note: This theosophy, which is a Christian esoteric tradition adhered to by theosophers, is a distinct movement from Theosophy, the occultist religion adhered to by Theosophists, despite the shared name.) adhering to the ideas of the early modern Lutheran thinker Jakob Bohme, and seeking to integrate ideas from Bohmian theosophy and occultism. It has been noted, however, that this distancing from the Theosophical Society should be understood in the light of polemical identity formations among esotericists towards the end of the nineteenth century.

=== Etic uses of the term ===
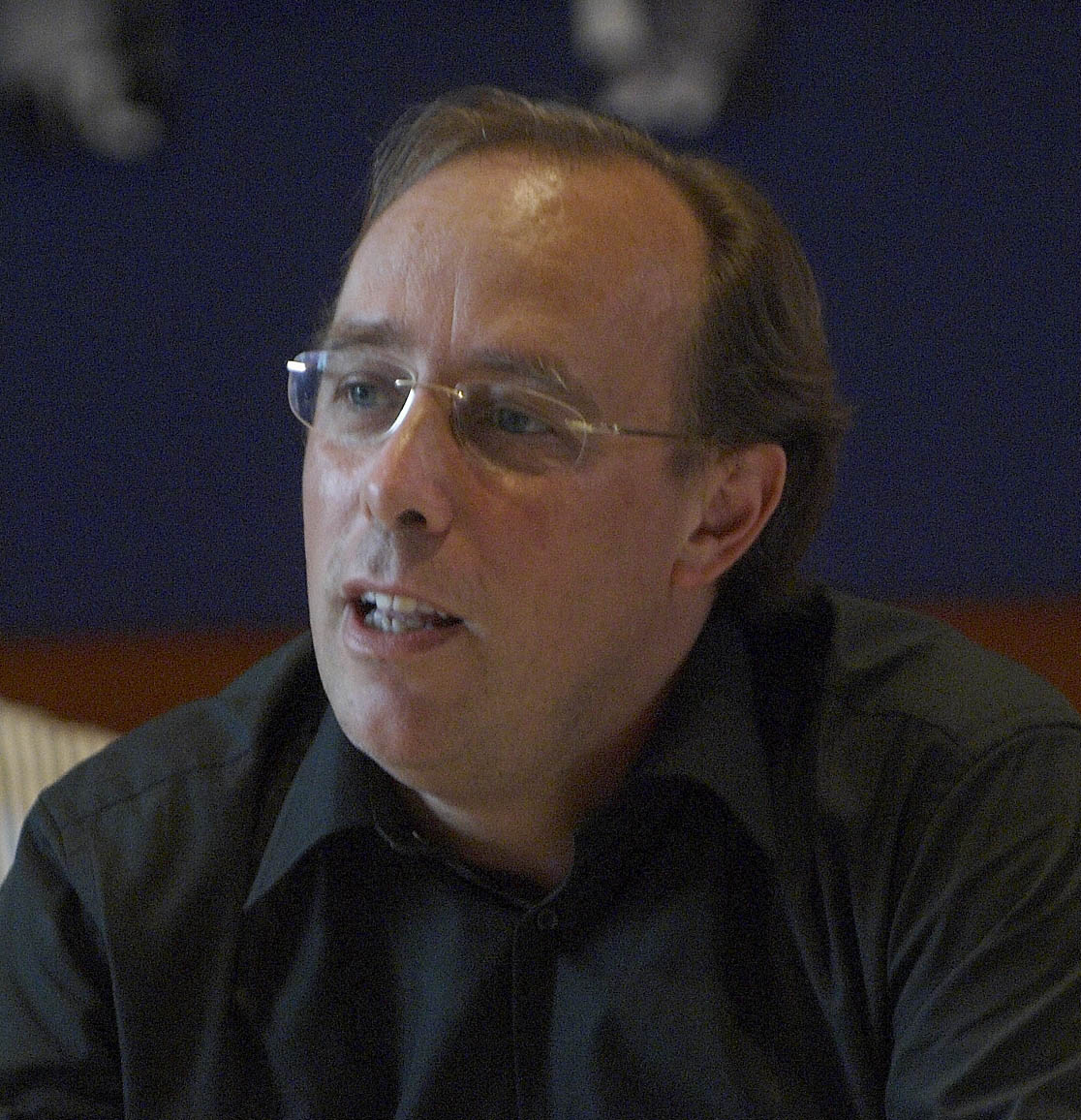
In the 1990s, the Dutch scholar Wouter Hanegraaff put forward a new definition of occultism for scholarly uses.

In the mid-1990s, a new definition of "occultism" was put forth by Wouter Hanegraaff. According to Hanegraaff, the term occultism can be used not only for the nineteenth-century groups which openly self-described using that term but can also be used in reference to "the type of esotericism that they represent".

Seeking to define occultism so that the term would be suitable "as an etic category" for scholars, Hanegraaff devised the following definition: "a category in the study of religions, which comprises "all attempts by esotericists to come to terms with a disenchanted world or, alternatively, by people in general to make sense of esotericism from the perspective of a disenchanted secular world". Hanegraaff noted that this etic usage of the term would be independent of emic usages of the term employed by occultists and other esotericists themselves.

In this definition, occultism encompasses many esoteric currents that have developed since the mid-nineteenth century, including Spiritualism, Theosophy, the Hermetic Order of the Golden Dawn, and the New Age. Employing this etic understanding of "occultism", Hanegraaff argued that its development could begin to be seen in the work of the Swedish esotericist Emanuel Swedenborg and in the lMesmerist movement of the eighteenth century, although added that occultism only emerged in "fully-developed form" as Spiritualism, a movement that developed in the United States during the mid-nineteenth century.

Marco Pasi suggested that the use of Hanegraaff's definition might cause confusion by presenting a group of nineteenth-century esotericists who called themselves "occultists" as just one part of a broader category of esotericists whom scholars would call "occultists".

Following these discussions, Julian Strube argued that Lévi and other contemporary authors who would now be regarded as esotericists developed their ideas not against the background of an esoteric tradition in the first place. Rather, Lévi's notion of occultism emerged in the context of highly influential radical socialist movements and widespread progressive, so-called neo-Catholic ideas. This further complicates Hanegraaff's characteristics of occultism, since, throughout the nineteenth century, they apply to these reformist movements rather than to a supposed group of esotericists.

== Modern usage ==
The term occult has also been used as a substantivized adjective as "the occult", a term that has been particularly widely used among journalists and sociologists. This term was popularised by the publication of Colin Wilson's 1971 book The Occult: A History. This term has been used as an "intellectual waste-basket" into which a wide array of beliefs and practices have been placed because they do not fit readily into the categories of religion or science. According to Hanegraaff, "the occult" is a category into which gets placed a range of beliefs from "spirits or fairies to parapsychological experiments, from UFO-abductions to Oriental mysticism, from vampire legends to channelling, and so on".

=== Occulture ===
The neologism occulture used within the industrial music scene of the late twentieth century was probably coined by one of its central figures, the musician and occultist Genesis P-Orridge. The scholar of religion Christopher Partridge used the term in an academic sense, stating that occulture was "the new spiritual environment in the West; the reservoir feeding new spiritual springs; the soil in which new spiritualities are growing".

== Occultism and technology ==
Recently scholars have offered perspectives on the occult as intertwined with media and technology. Examples include the work of film and media theorist Jeffrey Sconce and religious studies scholar John Durham Peters, both of whom suggest that occult movements historically utilize media and apparatuses as tools to reveal hidden aspects of reality or laws of nature. Erik Davis in his book Techgnosis gives an overview of occultism both ancient and modern from the perspective of cybernetics and information technologies. Philosopher Eugene Thacker discusses Heinrich Cornelius Agrippa's Three Books of Occult Philosophy in his book In The Dust Of This Planet, where he shows how the horror genre utilizes occult themes to reveal hidden realities.

== See also ==
- List of occult symbols
- List of occult terms
- List of occult writers
- List of occultists
- Magical organization
