= Esoterica (medication) =

Brand of skin cream

Esoterica is an over-the-counter topical ointment applied to the skin for the purpose of lightening freckles, age spots, chloasma, melasma, and other skin discolorations due to a benign localized increase in the production of melanin. Esoterica may have other appropriate medical uses as determined by a physician.

== Active and inactive ingredients ==
The active ingredients of Esoterica are:

- hydroquinone (2.0%), octyl dimethyl PABA (3.3%), and benzophenone 3 (2.5%);

The inactive ingredients are:

- water, glyceryl monostearate, isopropyl palmitate, ceresin, light mineral oil, PEG 6 32 stearate, poloxamer 188, propylene glycol, stearyl alcohol, steareth 10, steareth 20, laureth 23, allantoin ascorbate, sodium bisulfite, dimethicone, methylparaben, sodium lauryl sulfate, propylparaben, trisodium EDTA, BHA, and fragrance.

== See also ==
- Dermatology
- Hydroquinone
- Skin whitening
