= Kocku von Stuckrad =

German religious studies scholar

Kocku von Stuckrad (born 6 April 1966) is a German scholar of religious studies. He specialises in the European history of religion and the academic study of Western esotericism.

== Biography ==
Kocku von Stuckrad was born in Kpando, Ghana on 6 April 1966. He is a professor of religious studies at the University of Groningen. His research has focused on the European history of religion, Western esotericism, the connections between religion, nature, and science, and on methodological and theoretical approaches to the study of religion.

Stuckrad's approach to the academic study of Western esotericism focuses on claims of perfect or higher knowledge, rather than particular esoteric movements, and he has argued that secrecy should be regarded as one of the defining characteristics of the field. He has criticised the academic field of Western esotericism for having failed to produce sufficient critical examination of its key concepts from historical, sociological, and cultural perspectives. As an alternative, he argues for a discourse analysis approach to the history of Western esotericism.

He has edited various volumes including The Brill Dictionary of Religion (2006). He has co-edited the Journal of Religion in Europe and several academic monograph series published by Brill Publishers and De Gruyter.

== Selected publications ==
- Frömmigkeit und Wissenschaft: Astrologie in Tanach, Qumran und frührabbinischer Literatur' (Europäische Hochschulschriften XXIII/572). Frankfurt a. M. etc.: Peter Lang 1996.
- Das Ringen um die Astrologie: Jüdische und christliche Beiträge zum antiken Zeitverständnis (Religionsgeschichtliche Versuche und Vorarbeiten 49). Berlin & New York: Walter de Gruyter 2000.
- With Hans G. Kippenberg: Einführung in die Religionswissenschaft: Gegenstände und Begriffe (Reihe Beck Studium). Munich: C. H. Beck 2003.
- Schamanismus und Esoterik: Kultur- und wissenschaftsgeschichtliche Betrachtungen (Gnostica: Texts and Interpretations 4). Leuven: Peeters 2003.
- Geschichte der Astrologie: Von den Anfängen bis zur Gegenwart. Munich: C. H. Beck, 2003. Revised edition 2007.
- Was ist Esoterik? Kleine Geschichte des geheimen Wissens. Munich: C. H. Beck 2004.
  - English: Western Esotericism: A Brief History of Secret Knowledge. Translated and with a Foreword by Nicholas Goodrick-Clarke. London: Equinox 2005. Reprint London & New York: Routledge 2014.
  - Dutch: Esoterie: de zoektocht naar absolute kennis. Amsterdam: Amsterdam University Press 2014.
- 'Zo zijn we niet getrouwd': religie, natuurwetenschap en de radicalisering van de moderniteit. Inaugural Lecture for the Chair of Religious Studies, University of Groningen. Groningen: Faculty of Theology and Religious Studies 2010.
- Locations of Knowledge in Medieval and Early Modern Europe: Esoteric Discourse and Western Identities (Brill's Studies in Intellectual History 186). Leiden & Boston: Brill 2010.
- The Scientification of Religion: An Historical Study of Discursive Change, 1800–2000. Berlin & Boston: De Gruyter 2014.
- Die Seele im 20. Jahrhundert: Eine Kulturgeschichte. Paderborn: Wilhelm Fink 2019.
  - English and revised: A Cultural History of the Soul: Europe and North America from 1870 to the Present. New York: Columbia University Press 2022.
- Nach der Ausbeutung: Wie unser Verhältnis zur Erde gelingen kann. Munich: Europa Verlag 2024.
