= Antoine Faivre =

French academic (1934–2021)

- Born: 5 June 1934; Reims
- Died: 19 December 2021 (aged 87)

Academic work
- Discipline: Western esotericism

Antoine Faivre (5 June 1934 – 19 December 2021) was a French scholar of Western esotericism. He played a major role in the founding of the discipline as a scholarly field of study, and he was the first-ever person to be appointed to an academic chair in the discipline. Together with Roland Edighoffer he founded the predecessor to the journal Aries in 1983, which in 2001 was relaunched with Wouter Hanegraaff as its editor.

Until his retirement, he held a chair in the École Pratique des Hautes Études at the Sorbonne, University Professor of Germanic studies at the University of Haute-Normandie, director of the Cahiers del Hermétisme and of Bibliothèque de l'hermétisme.

== Early life ==
Faivre was born in Reims in 1934. His father, a tax officer, was active in the French Resistance to Nazi occupation, for which he was imprisoned at one point. Faivre was raised as a Roman Catholic. He studied literature at the Lycée Louis le Grand for a year before moving on to study German and English literature at the Sorbonne. He served in the French military in Algeria (during the Algerian War) from 1959 to 1962. During his military service he had a mystical experience that led him to return to Catholicism, which he had moved away from during his adolescence.

== Thought ==
Antoine Faivre believed that occultism, gnosticism and hermeticism share a set of common characteristics that include the faith in the existence of secret and syncretistic correspondences – both symbolic and real – between the "macrocosm and the microcosm, the seen and the unseen, and indeed all that is". Those doctrines believe in alchemic transmutation and on an initiatic transmission of knowledge from a master to his pupil.

According to Hanegraaff, Faivre's criteria for what constitutes Western esotericism can be seen as essentially describing an "enchanted" worldview, as compared to Max Weber's notion of "disenchantment". Hanegraaff also traces Faivre's notion of "correspondences" back to the Neoplatonic concept of sympatheia.

In terms of his personal religious beliefs, Faivre quietly identified as a Catholic throughout his adult life, though he was cautious of established religious institutions and claims of doctrinal exclusivism. Faivre was also a Freemason--he was initiated in the Grande Loge Nationale Française-Opéra in 1969.

== Death ==
Faivre died of cancer on 19 December 2021, at the age of 87.

== Bibliography ==
- Les vampires: Essai historique, critique et littéraire, Paris, Le Terrain vague, 1962
- Kirchberger et l’Illuminisme du XVIIIe siècle, The Hague, Nijhoff, 1966
- Eckartshausen et la théosophie chrétienne, Paris, Klincksieck, 1969 (reprinted with a preface by Jean-Marc Vivenza, Hyères, La Pierre Philosophale, 2016)
- L’ésotérisme au XVIIIe siècle en France et en Allemagne, La Table d’Émeraude, Seghers, 1973
- Mystiques, théosophes et illuminés au siècle des lumières, Hildesheim, Olms, 1976
- Toison d'or et alchimie, Milan, Archè, 1990. English transl. Golden Fleece and Alchemy, Albany, State University of New York Press, 1993, reprint 1995
- Philosophie de la nature (physique sacrée et théosophie, XVIIIe-XIXe siècles), Paris, Albin Michel, 1996 (Prix de philosophie Louis Liard, de l'Académie des Sciences morales et politiques).
- The Eternal Hermes (From Greek God to Alchemical Magus), Grand Rapids, Phanes Press, 1996
- Accès de l'ésotérisme occidental, Paris, Gallimard ("Bibliothèque des sciences humaines"), vol. I, 1986, 2nd ed., 1996, vol. II, 1996. English transl. vol. I : Access to Western Esotericism, Albany, State University of New York Press, 1994, vol. II: Theosophy, Imagination, Tradition, Studies in Western Esotericism, Albany, State University of New York Press, 2000
- L'ésotérisme, Paris, PUF, 1992, 3e éd., 2003
- De Londres à Saint-Pétersbourg: Carl Friedrich Tieman (1743-1802) aux carrefours des courants illuministes et maçonniques, Milan, Archè, 2018
