= Western esotericism =

Range of related ideas and movements that have developed in the Western world

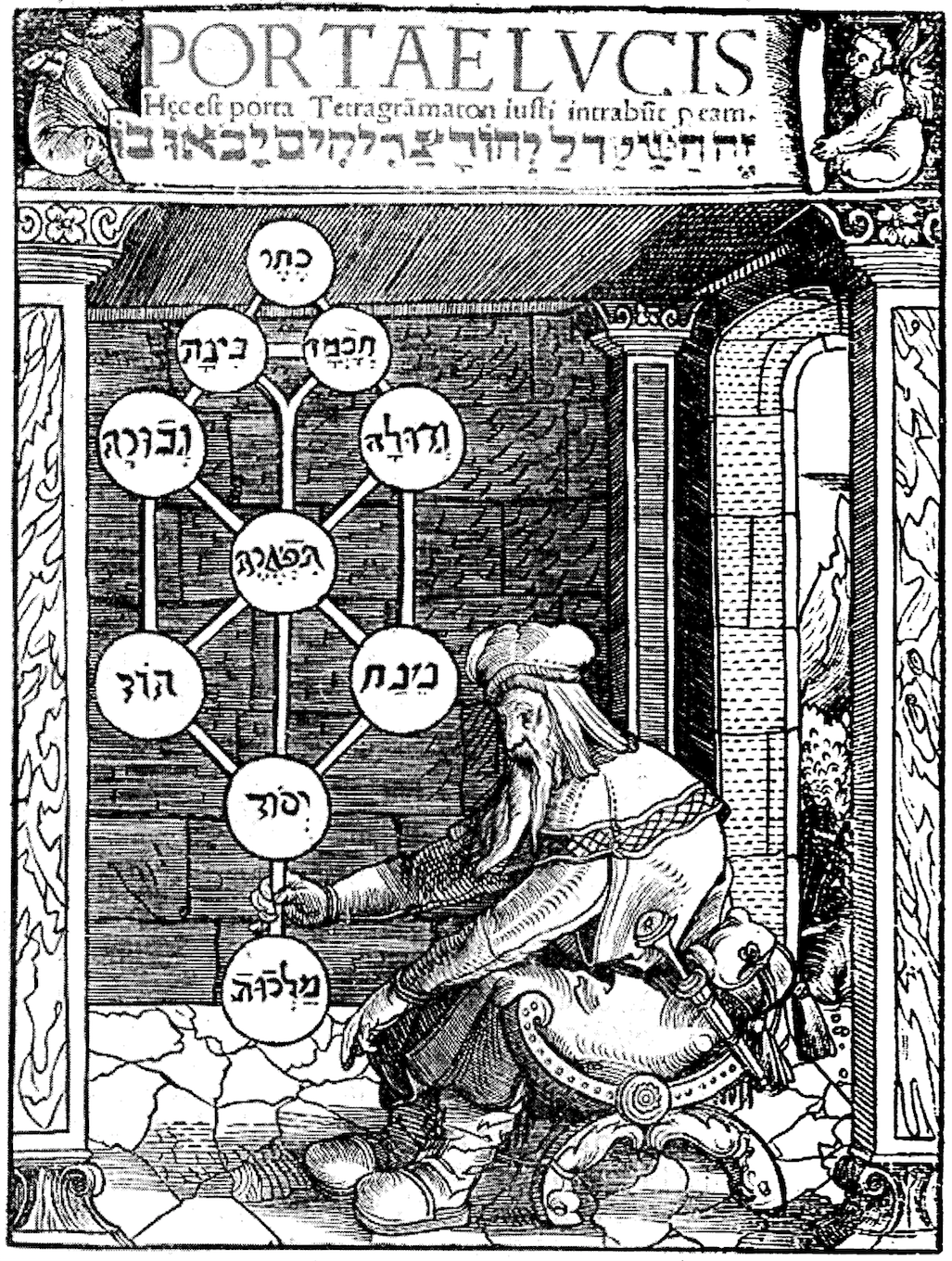
The tree of life as represented in the Kabbalah, containing the sefirot

Western esotericism, also known as the Western mystery tradition, is a wide range of loosely related ideas and movements that developed within Western society. These ideas and currents are united in their distinctness both from orthodox Abrahamic religion and Age of Enlightenment rationalism. It has influenced, or contributed to, various forms of Western philosophy, mysticism, religion, science, pseudoscience, art, literature, and music.

The idea of grouping a wide range of Western traditions and philosophies together under the term esotericism developed in 17th-century Europe. Various academics have debated numerous definitions of Western esotericism. One view adopts a definition from certain esotericist schools of thought themselves, treating "esotericism" as a perennial hidden inner tradition. A second perspective sees esotericism as a category of movements that embrace an "enchanted" worldview in the face of increasing disenchantment. A third views Western esotericism as encompassing all of Western culture's "rejected knowledge" that is accepted neither by the scientific establishment nor orthodox religious authorities.

The earliest traditions of Western esotericism emerged in the Eastern Mediterranean during Late Antiquity, where Hermeticism, Gnosticism and Neoplatonism developed as schools of thought distinct from what became mainstream Christianity. Renaissance Europe saw increasing interest in many of these older ideas, with various intellectuals combining pagan philosophies with the Kabbalah and Christian philosophy, resulting in the emergence of esoteric movements like Christian Kabbalah and Christian theosophy. The 17th century saw the development of initiatory societies professing esoteric knowledge such as Rosicrucianism and Freemasonry, while the Age of Enlightenment of the 18th century led to the development of new forms of esoteric thought. The 19th century saw the emergence of new trends of esoteric thought now known as occultism. Significant groups in this century included the Societas Rosicruciana in Anglia, the Theosophical Society and the Hermetic Order of the Golden Dawn. Also important in this connection is Martinus Thomsen's "spiritual science". Modern paganism developed within occultism and includes religious movements such as Wicca. Esoteric ideas permeated the counterculture of the 1960s and later cultural tendencies, which led to the New Age phenomenon in the 1970s.

The idea that these disparate movements could be classified as "Western esotericism" developed in the late 18th century, but these esoteric currents were largely ignored as a subject of academic enquiry. The academic study of Western esotericism only emerged in the late 20th century, pioneered by scholars like Frances Yates and Antoine Faivre.

== Etymology ==
The concept of the "esoteric" originated in the 2nd century with the coining of the Ancient Greek adjective esôterikós ("belonging to an inner circle"); the earliest known example of the word appeared in a satire authored by Lucian (c. 125 – after 180).

In the 15th and 16th centuries, differentiations in Latin between exotericus and esotericus (along with internus and externus) were common in the scholar discourse on ancient philosophy. The categories of doctrina vulgaris and doctrina arcana are found among Cambridge Platonists. Perhaps for the first time in English, Thomas Stanley, between 1655 and 1660, would refer to the Pythagorean exoterick and esoterick. John Toland in 1720 would state that the so-called nowadays "esoteric distinction" was a universal phenomenon, present in both the West and the East. As for the noun "esotericism", probably the first mention in German of Esoterismus appeared in a 1779 work by Johann Georg Hamann, and the use of Esoterik in 1790 by Johann Gottfried Eichhorn. But the word esoterisch had already existed at least since 1731–1736, as found in the works of Johann Jakob Brucker; this author rejected everything that is characterized today as an "esoteric corpus". In this 18th century context, these terms referred to Pythagoreanism or Neoplatonic theurgy, but the concept was particularly sedimentated by two streams of discourses: speculations about the influences of the Egyptians on ancient philosophy and religion, and their associations with Masonic discourses and other secret societies, who claimed to keep such ancient secrets until the Enlightenment; and the emergence of orientalist academic studies, which since the 17th century identified the presence of mysteries, secrets or esoteric "ancient wisdom" in Persian, Arab, Indian and Far Eastern texts and practices (see also Early Western reception of Eastern esotericism).

The noun "esotericism" (in its French form "ésotérisme") first appeared in 1828 in the work by Protestant historian of gnosticism Jacques Matter (1791–1864), Histoire critique du gnosticisme (3 vols.). The term "esotericism" thus came into use in the wake of the Age of Enlightenment and of its critique of institutionalised religion, during which alternative religious groups such as the Rosicrucians began to disassociate themselves from the dominant Christianity in Western Europe. During the 19th and 20th centuries, scholars increasingly saw the term "esotericism" as meaning something distinct from Christianity—as a subculture at odds with the Christian mainstream from at least the time of the Renaissance. After being introduced by Jacques Matter in French, the occultist and ceremonial magician Eliphas Lévi (1810–1875) popularized the term in the 1850s. Lévi also introduced the term l'occultisme, a notion that he developed against the background of contemporary socialist and Catholic discourses. "Esotericism" and "occultism" were often employed as synonyms until later scholars distinguished the concepts.

=== Philosophical usage ===
In the context of Ancient Greek philosophy, the terms "esoteric" and "exoteric" were sometimes used by scholars not to denote that there was secrecy, but to distinguish two procedures of research and education: the first reserved for teachings that were developed "within the walls" of the philosophical school, among a circle of thinkers ("eso-" indicating what is unseen, as in the classes internal to the institution), and the second referring to those whose works were disseminated to the public in speeches and published ("exo-": outside). The initial meaning of this last word is implied when Aristotle coined the term "exoteric speeches" (ἐξωτερικοὶ λόγοι), perhaps to refer to the speeches he gave outside his school.

However, Aristotle never employed the term "esoteric" and there is no evidence that he dealt with specialized secrets; there is a dubious report by Aulus Gellius, according to which Aristotle disclosed the exoteric subjects of politics, rhetoric and ethics to the general public in the afternoon, while he reserved the morning for "akroatika" (acroamatics), referring to natural philosophy and logic, taught during a walk with his students. Furthermore, the term "exoteric" for Aristotle could have another meaning, hypothetically referring to an extracosmic reality, ta exo, superior to and beyond Heaven, requiring abstraction and logic. This reality stood in contrast to what he called enkyklioi logoi, knowledge "from within the circle", involving the intracosmic physics that surrounds everyday life. There is a report by Strabo and Plutarch, however, which states that the Lyceum's school texts were circulated internally, their publication was more controlled than the exoteric ones, and that these "esoteric" texts were rediscovered and compiled only with the efforts of Andronicus of Rhodes.

Plato would have orally transmitted intramural teachings to his disciples, the supposed "esoteric" content of which regarding the First Principles is particularly highlighted by the Tübingen School as distinct from the apparent written teachings conveyed in his books or public lectures. Georg Wilhelm Friedrich Hegel commented on the analysis of this distinction in the modern hermeneutics of Plato and Aristotle:

To express an external object not much is required, but to communicate an idea a capacity must be present, and this always remains something esoteric, so that there has never been anything purely exoteric about what philosophers say.

In any case, drawing from the tradition of discourses that supposedly revealed a vision of the absolute and truth present in mythology and initiatory rites of mystery religions, Plato and his philosophy began the Western perception of esotericism, to the point that Kocku von Stuckrad stated "esoteric ontology and anthropology would hardly exist without Platonic philosophy." In his dialogues, he uses expressions that refer to cultic secrecy (for example, ἀπορρήτων, aporrhéton, one of the Ancient Greek expressions referring to the prohibition of revealing a secret, in the context of mysteries). In Theaetetus 152c, there is an example of this concealment strategy:

Can it be, then, that Protagoras was a very ingenious person who threw out this obscure utterance for the unwashed like us but reserved the truth as a secret doctrine (ἐν ἀπορρήτῳ τὴν ἀλήθειαν) to be revealed to his disciples?

The Neoplatonists intensified the search for a "hidden truth" under the surface of teachings, myths and texts, developing the hermeneutics and allegorical exegesis of Plato, Homer, Orpheus and others. Plutarch, for example, developed the justification of a theological esotericism, and Numenius wrote "On the Secrets of Plato" (Peri tôn para Platoni aporrhèta).

Probably based on the "exôtikos/esôtikos" dichotomy, the Hellenic world developed the classical distinction between exoteric/esoteric, stimulated by criticism from various currents such as the Patristics. According to examples in Lucian, Galen and Clement of Alexandria, at that time it was a common practice among philosophers to keep secret writings and teachings. A parallel secrecy and reserved elite was also found in the contemporary environment of Gnosticism. Later, Iamblichus would present his definition (close to the modern one), as he classified the ancient Pythagoreans as either "exoteric" mathematicians or "esoteric" acousmatics, the latter being those who disseminated enigmatic teachings and hidden allegorical meanings.

== Conceptual development ==
'Western esotericism' is not a natural term but an artificial category, applied retrospectively to a range of currents and ideas that were known by other names at least prior to the end of the eighteenth century. [This] means that, originally, not all those currents and ideas were necessarily seen as belonging together:... it is only as recently as the later seventeenth century that we find the first attempts at presenting them as one single, coherent field or domain, and at explaining what they have in common. In short, 'Western esotericism' is a modern scholarly construct, not an autonomous tradition that already existed out there and merely needed to be discovered by historians.

— The scholar of esotericism Wouter Hanegraaff, 2013.

The concept of "Western esotericism" represents a modern scholarly construct rather than a pre-existing, self-defined tradition of thought. In the late 17th century, several European Christian thinkers presented the argument that one could categorise certain traditions of Western philosophy and thought together, thus establishing the category now labelled "Western esotericism". The first to do so, Ehregott Daniel Colberg (1659–1698), a German Lutheran theologian, wrote Platonisch-Hermetisches Christianity (1690–91). A hostile critic of various currents of Western thought that had emerged since the Renaissance—among them Paracelsianism, Weigelianism, and Christian theosophy—in his book he labelled all of these traditions under the category of "Platonic–Hermetic Christianity", portraying them as heretical to what he saw as "true" Christianity. Despite his hostile attitude toward these traditions of thought, Colberg became the first to connect these disparate philosophies and to study them under one rubric, also recognising that these ideas linked back to earlier philosophies from late antiquity.

In 18th-century Europe, during the Age of Enlightenment, these esoteric traditions came to be regularly categorised under the labels of "superstition", "magic", and "the occult"—terms often used interchangeably. The modern academy, then in the process of developing, consistently rejected and ignored topics coming under "the occult", thus leaving research into them largely to enthusiasts outside of academia. Indeed, according to the historian of esotericism Wouter J. Hanegraaff (born 1961), rejection of "occult" topics was seen as a "crucial identity marker" for any intellectuals seeking to affiliate themselves with the academy.

Scholars established this category in the late 18th century after identifying "structural similarities" between "the ideas and world views of a wide variety of thinkers and movements" that, previously, had not been in the same analytical grouping. According to the scholar of esotericism Wouter J. Hanegraaff, the term provided a "useful generic label" for "a large and complicated group of historical phenomena that had long been perceived as sharing an air de famille."

Various academics have emphasised that esotericism is a phenomenon unique to the Western world. As Faivre stated, an "empirical perspective" would hold that "esotericism is a Western notion." As scholars such as Faivre and Hanegraaff have pointed out, there is no comparable category of "Eastern" or "Oriental" esotericism. The emphasis on Western esotericism was nevertheless primarily devised to distinguish the field from a universal esotericism. Hanegraaff has characterised these as "recognisable world views and approaches to knowledge that have played an important though always controversial role in the history of Western culture". Historian of religion Henrik Bogdan asserted that Western esotericism constituted "a third pillar of Western culture" alongside "doctrinal faith and rationality", being deemed heretical by the former and irrational by the latter. Scholars nevertheless recognise that various non-Western traditions have exerted "a profound influence" over Western esotericism, citing the example of the Theosophical Society's incorporation of Hindu and Buddhist concepts like reincarnation into its doctrines. Given these influences and the imprecise nature of the term "Western", the scholar of esotericism Kennet Granholm has argued that academics should cease referring to "Western esotericism" altogether, instead simply favouring "esotericism" as a descriptor of this phenomenon. Egil Asprem has endorsed this approach.

== Definition ==
The historian of esotericism Antoine Faivre noted that "never a precise term, [esotericism] has begun to overflow its boundaries on all sides", with both Faivre and Karen-Claire Voss stating that Western esotericism consists of "a vast spectrum of authors, trends, works of philosophy, religion, art, literature, and music". Scholars broadly agree on which currents of thought fall within a category of esotericism—ranging from ancient Gnosticism and Hermeticism through to Rosicrucianism and the Kabbalah and on to more recent phenomenon such as the New Age movement. Nevertheless, esotericism itself remains a controversial term, with scholars specialising in the subject disagreeing as to how best to define it.

=== As a universal secret inner tradition ===
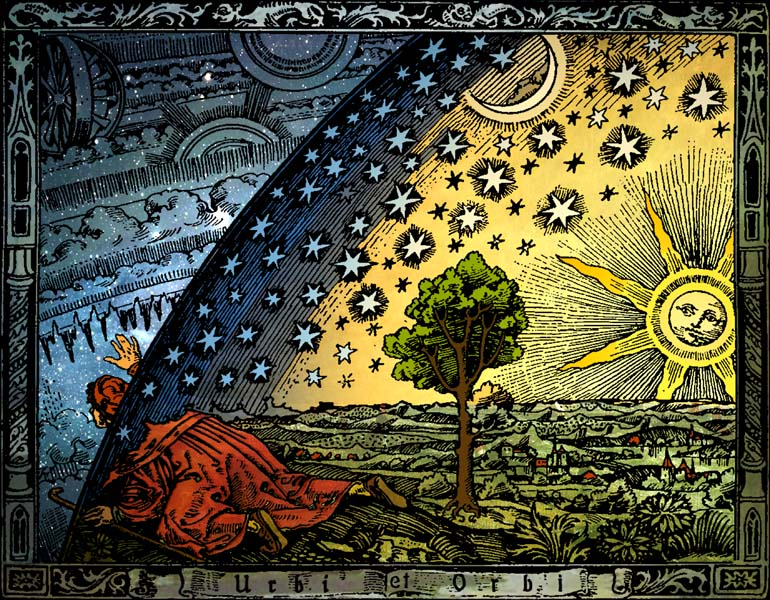
A colored version of the 1888 Flammarion engraving

Some scholars have used Western esotericism to refer to "inner traditions" concerned with a "universal spiritual dimension of reality, as opposed to the merely external ('exoteric') religious institutions and dogmatic systems of established religions." This approach views Western esotericism as just one variant of a worldwide esotericism at the heart of all world religions and cultures, reflecting a hidden esoteric reality. This use is closest to the original meaning of the word in late antiquity, where it applied to secret spiritual teachings that were reserved for a specific elite and hidden from the masses. This definition was popularised in the published work of 19th-century esotericists like A. E. Waite, who sought to combine their own mystical beliefs with a historical interpretation of esotericism. It subsequently became a popular approach within several esoteric movements, most notably Martinism and Traditionalism.

This definition, originally developed by esotericists themselves, became popular among French academics during the 1980s, exerting a strong influence over the scholars Mircea Eliade, Henry Corbin, and the early work of Faivre. Within the academic field of religious studies, those who study different religions in search of an inner universal dimension to them all are termed "religionists". Such religionist ideas also exerted an influence on more recent scholars like Nicholas Goodrick-Clarke and Arthur Versluis. Versluis for instance defined "Western esotericism" as "inner or hidden spiritual knowledge transmitted through Western European historical currents that in turn feed into North American and other non-European settings". He added that these Western esoteric currents all shared a core characteristic, "a claim to gnosis, or direct spiritual insight into cosmology or spiritual insight", and accordingly he suggested that these currents could be referred to as "Western gnostic" just as much as "Western esoteric".

There are various problems with this model for understanding Western esotericism. The most significant is that it rests upon the conviction that there really is a "universal, hidden, esoteric dimension of reality" that objectively exists. The existence of this universal inner tradition has not been discovered through scientific or scholarly enquiry; this had led some to claim that it does not exist, though Hanegraaff thought it better to adopt a view based in methodological agnosticism by stating that "we simply do not know—and cannot know" if it exists or not. He noted that, even if such a true and absolute nature of reality really existed, it would only be accessible through "esoteric" spiritual practices, and could not be discovered or measured by the "exoteric" tools of scientific and scholarly enquiry. Hanegraaff pointed out that an approach that seeks a common inner hidden core of all esoteric currents masks that such groups often differ greatly, being rooted in their own historical and social contexts and expressing mutually exclusive ideas and agendas. A third issue was that many of those currents widely recognised as esoteric never concealed their teachings, and in the 20th century came to permeate popular culture, thus problematizing the claim that esotericism could be defined by its hidden and secretive nature. He noted that when scholars adopt this definition, it shows that they subscribe to the religious doctrines espoused by the very groups they are studying.

=== As an enchanted world view ===
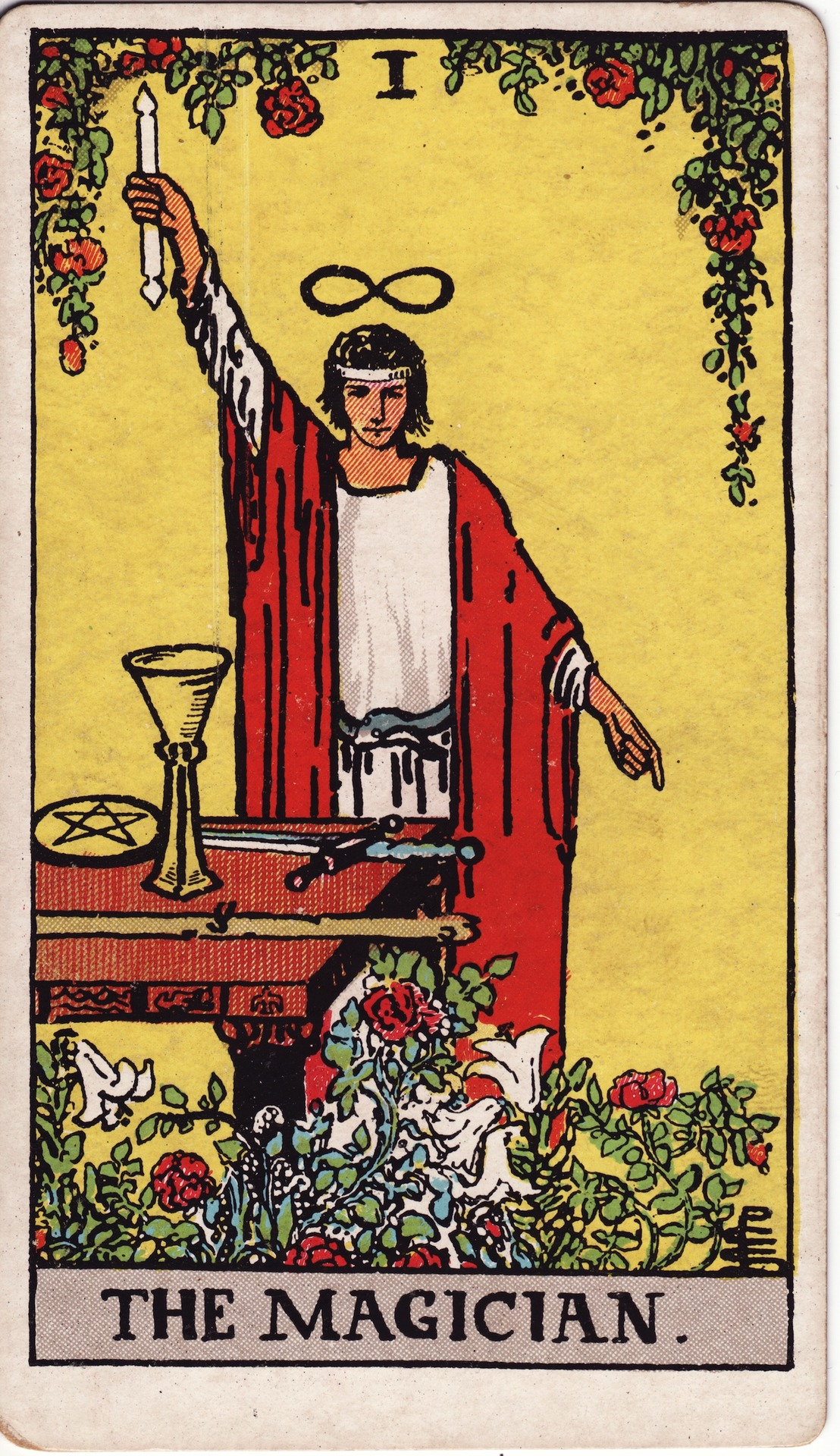
The Magician, a tarot card displaying the Hermetic concept of "as above, so below". Faivre connected this concept to 'correspondences', his first defining characteristic of esotericism.

Another approach to Western esotericism treats it as a world view that embraces "enchantment" in contrast to world views influenced by post-Cartesian, post-Newtonian, and positivist science that sought to "dis-enchant" the world. That approach understands esotericism as comprising those world views that eschew a belief in instrumental causality and instead adopt a belief that all parts of the universe are interrelated without a need for causal chains. It stands as a radical alternative to the disenchanted world views that have dominated Western culture since the Scientific Revolution, and must therefore always be at odds with secular culture.

An early exponent of this definition was the historian of Renaissance thought Frances Yates in her discussions of a Hermetic Tradition, which she saw as an "enchanted" alternative to established religion and rationalistic science. The primary exponent of this view was Faivre, who published a series of criteria for how to define "Western esotericism" in 1992. Faivre claimed that esotericism was "identifiable by the presence of six fundamental characteristics or components", four of which were "intrinsic" and thus vital to defining something as being esoteric, while the other two were "secondary" and thus not necessarily present in every form of esotericism. He listed these characteristics as follows:

1. "Correspondences": This is the idea that there are both real and symbolic correspondences existing between all things within the universe. As examples for this, Faivre pointed to the esoteric concept of the macrocosm and microcosm, often presented as the dictum of "as above, so below", as well as the astrological idea that the actions of the planets have a direct corresponding influence on the behaviour of human beings.
2. "Living Nature": Faivre argued that all esotericists envision the natural universe as being imbued with its own life force, and that as such they understand it as being "complex, plural, hierarchical".
3. "Imagination and Mediations": Faivre believed that all esotericists place great emphasis on both the human imagination, and mediations—"such as rituals, symbolic images, mandalas, intermediary spirits"—and mantras as tools that provide access to worlds and levels of reality existing between the material world and the divine.
4. "Experience of Transmutation": Faivre's fourth intrinsic characteristic of esotericism was the emphasis that esotericists place on fundamentally transforming themselves through their practice, for instance through the spiritual transformation that is alleged to accompany the attainment of gnosis.
5. "Practice of Concordance": The first of Faivre's secondary characteristics of esotericism was the belief—held by many esotericists, such as those in the Traditionalist School—that there is a fundamental unifying principle or root from which all world religions and spiritual practices emerge. The common esoteric principle is that attaining this unifying principle can bring the world's different belief systems together in unity.
6. "Transmission": Faivre's second secondary characteristic was the emphasis on the transmission of esoteric teachings and secrets from a master to their disciple, through a process of initiation.

Faivre's form of categorisation has been endorsed by scholars like Goodrick-Clarke, and by 2007 Bogdan could note that Faivre's had become "the standard definition" of Western esotericism in use among scholars. In 2013 the scholar Kennet Granholm stated only that Faivre's definition had been "the dominating paradigm for a long while" and that it "still exerts influence among scholars outside the study of Western esotericism". The advantage of Faivre's system is that it facilitates comparing varying esoteric traditions "with one another in a systematic fashion." Other scholars criticised his theory, pointing out various weaknesses. Hanegraaff claimed that Faivre's approach entailed "reasoning by prototype" in that it relied upon already having a "best example" of what Western esotericism should look like, against which other phenomena then had to be compared. The scholar of esotericism Kocku von Stuckrad (born 1966) noted that Faivre's taxonomy was based on his own areas of specialism—Renaissance Hermeticism, Christian Kabbalah, and Protestant Theosophy—and that it was thus not based on a wider understanding of esotericism as it has existed throughout history, from the ancient world to the contemporary period. Accordingly, Von Stuckrad suggested that it was a good typology for understanding "Christian esotericism in the early modern period" but lacked utility beyond that.

=== As higher knowledge ===
Somewhat crudely, esotericism can be described as a Western form of spirituality that stresses the importance of the individual effort to gain spiritual knowledge, or gnosis, whereby man is confronted with the divine aspect of existence.

— Historian of religion Henrik Bogdan, 2007.

As an alternative to Faivre's framework, Kocku von Stuckrad developed his own variant, though he argued that this did not represent a "definition" but rather "a framework of analysis" for scholarly usage. He stated that "on the most general level of analysis", esotericism represented "the claim of higher knowledge", a claim to possessing "wisdom that is superior to other interpretations of cosmos and history" that serves as a "master key for answering all questions of humankind." Accordingly, he believed that esoteric groups placed a great emphasis on secrecy, not because they were inherently rooted in elite groups but because the idea of concealed secrets that can be revealed was central to their discourse. Examining the means of accessing higher knowledge, he highlighted two themes that he believed could be found within esotericism, that of mediation through contact with non-human entities, and individual experience. Accordingly, for Von Stuckrad, esotericism could be best understood as "a structural element of Western culture" rather than as a selection of different schools of thought.

=== As rejected knowledge ===
Hanegraaff proposed an additional definition that "Western esotericism" is a category that represents "the academy's dustbin of rejected knowledge." In this respect, it contains all of the theories and world views rejected by the mainstream intellectual community because they do not accord with "normative conceptions of religion, rationality and science." His approach is rooted within the field of the history of ideas, and stresses the role of change and transformation over time.

Goodrick-Clarke was critical of this approach, believing that it relegated Western esotericism to the position of "a casualty of positivist and materialist perspectives in the nineteenth-century" and thus reinforces the idea that Western esoteric traditions were of little historical importance. Bogdan similarly expressed concern regarding Hanegraaff's definition, believing that it made the category of Western esotericism "all inclusive" and thus analytically useless.

== History ==
=== Late Antiquity ===
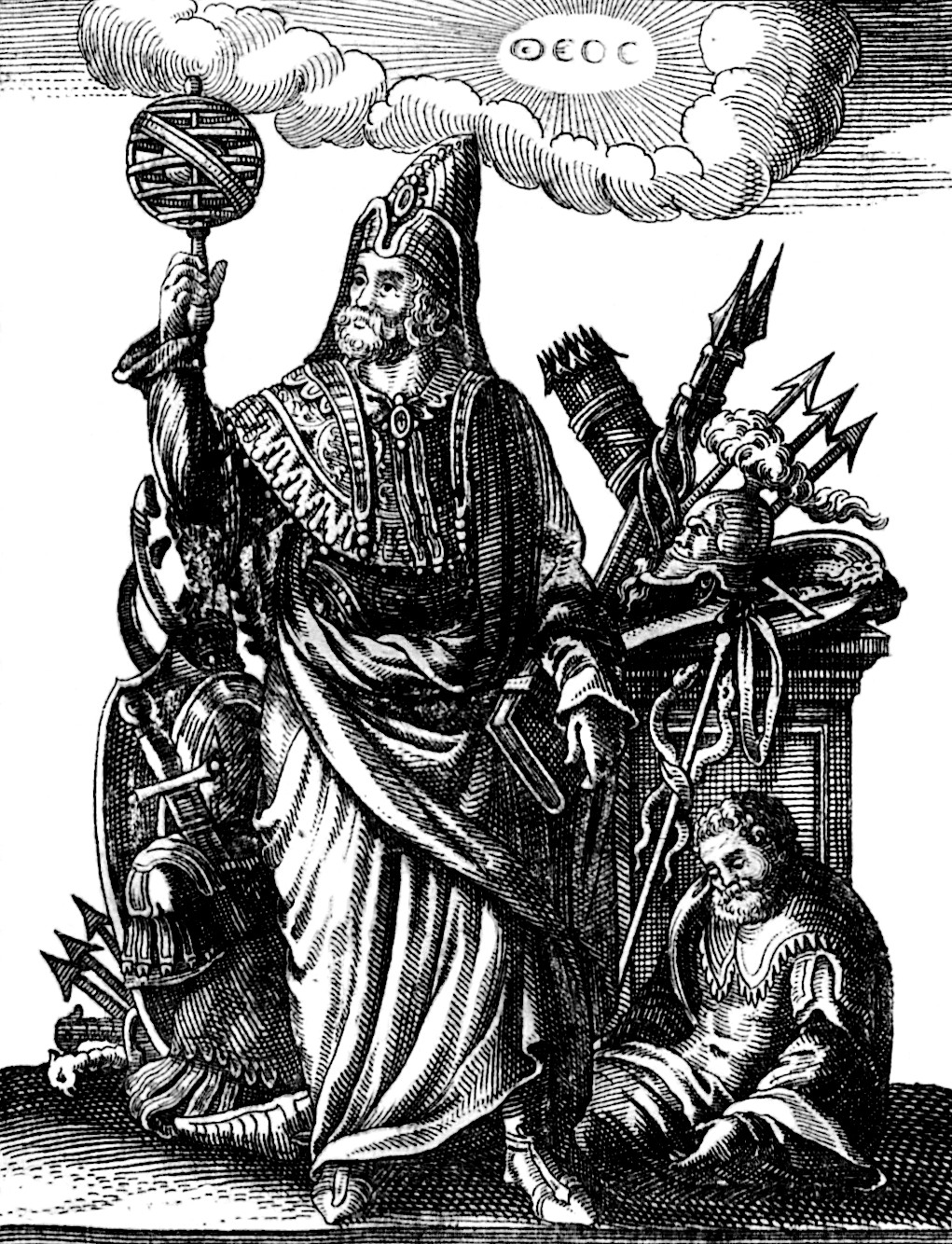
A later illustration of Hermes Trismegistus

The origins of Western esotericism are in the Hellenistic Eastern Mediterranean, then part of the Roman Empire, during Late Antiquity. This was a milieu that mixed religious and intellectual traditions from Greece, Egypt, the Levant, Babylon, and Persia—in which globalisation, urbanisation, and multiculturalism were bringing about socio-cultural change.

One component of this was Hermeticism, an Egyptian Hellenistic school of thought that takes its name from a legendary Egyptian wise man named Hermes Trismegistus. In the 2nd and 3rd centuries, a number of texts attributed to Hermes Trismegistus appeared, including the Corpus Hermeticum, Asclepius, and The Discourse on the Eighth and Ninth. Some still debate whether Hermeticism was a purely literary phenomenon or had communities of practitioners who acted on these ideas, but it has been established that these texts discuss the true nature of God, emphasising that humans must transcend rational thought and worldly desires to find salvation and be reborn into a spiritual body of immaterial light, thereby achieving spiritual unity with divinity.

Another tradition of esoteric thought in Late Antiquity was Gnosticism. Gnostic sects broadly believed that the so-called divine light had been imprisoned within the material world by a malevolent entity known as the Demiurge, who was served by demonic helpers, the Archons. It was the Gnostic belief that people, who were imbued with the divine light, should seek to attain gnosis and thus escape from the world of matter and rejoin the divine source.

A third form of esotericism in Late Antiquity was Neoplatonism, a school of thought influenced by the ideas of the philosopher Plato. Advocated by such figures as Plotinus, Porphyry of Tyre, Iamblichus, and Proclus, Neoplatonism held that the human soul had fallen from its divine origins into the material world, but that it could progress, through a number of hierarchical spheres of being, to return to its divine origins once more. The later Neoplatonists performed theurgy, a ritual practice attested in such sources as the Chaldean Oracles. Scholars are still unsure of precisely what theurgy involved, but know it involved a practice designed to make gods appear, who could then raise the theurgist's mind to the reality of the divine.

=== Middle Ages ===
After the fall of Rome, alchemy and philosophy and other aspects of the tradition were largely preserved in the Arab and Near Eastern world and reintroduced into Western Europe by Jews and by the cultural contact between Christians and Muslims in Spain, Sicily and southern Italy. The 12th century saw the development of the Kabbalah in southern Italy and medieval Spain.

The medieval period also saw the publication of grimoires, which often offered elaborate formulas for theurgy and thaumaturgy. Many of the grimoires seem to have kabbalistic influence. Figures in alchemy from this period also seem to have authored or used grimoires. Medieval sects deemed heretical, such as the Waldensians, were thought to have utilized esoteric concepts.

=== Renaissance and Early Modern period ===
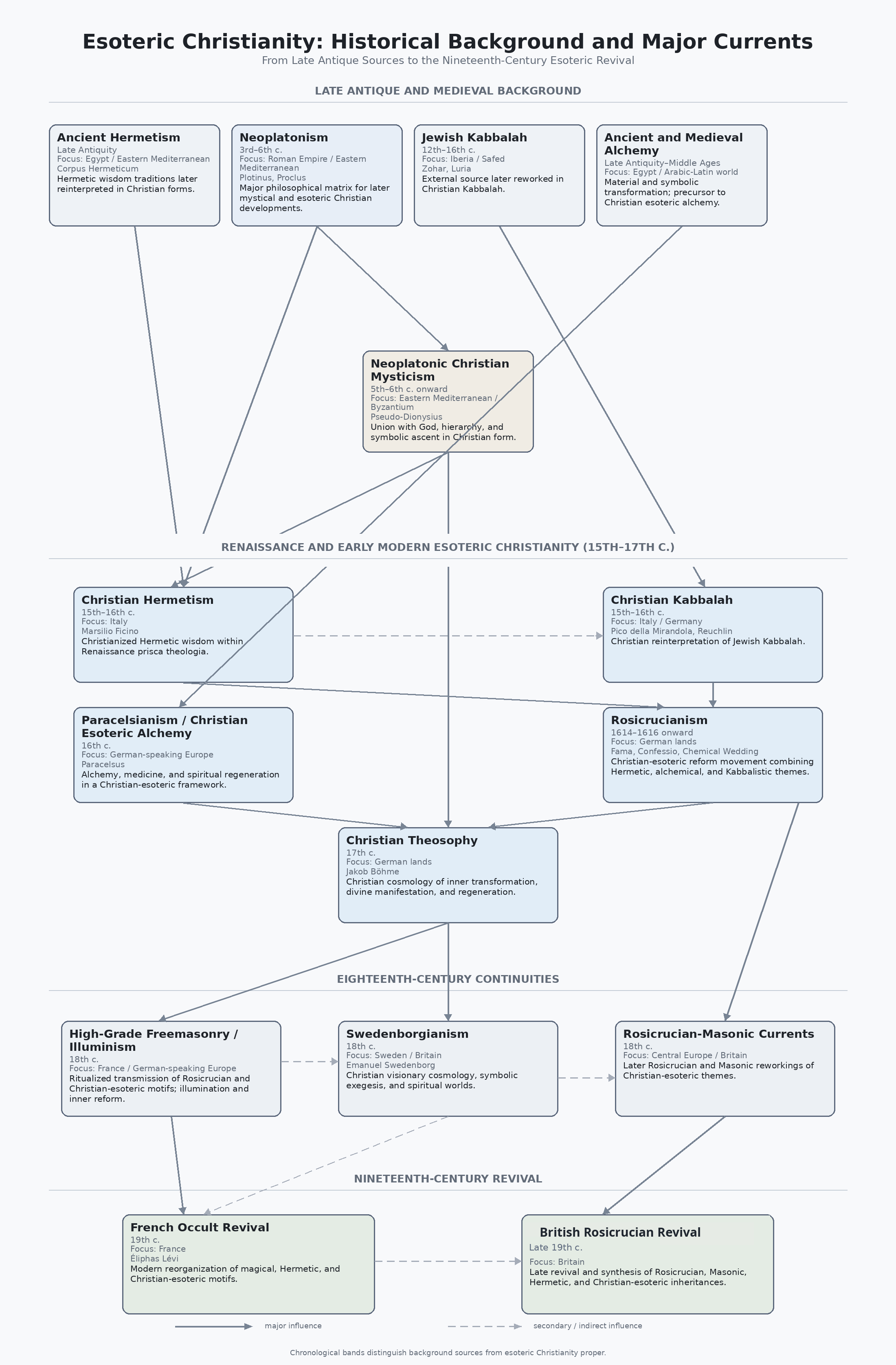
Synoptic chart of the historical background and major currents of esoteric Christianity. Esoteric Christianity properly emerged during the Renaissance; the theory of prisca theologia, present in sectors of the humanist movement, favored the Christian reinterpretation of platonism, hermeticism, alchemy, and kabbalah. However, the esoteric Christianity that reached the contemporary era was mediated by the Romantic movement of the late 18th century and 19th century; Romantic sensibility revalued the imagination, the forces of nature, and the symbolic world—in a context of declining esotericism in the face of Enlightenment trends and scientific revolutions—thus fostering the cultural climate of the subsequent 19th century occult revival.

During the Renaissance, a number of European thinkers began to synthesize "pagan"—more directly, non-Christian—philosophies, which were then being made available through Arabic translations, with Christian thought and the Jewish Kabbalah. The earliest of these individuals was the Byzantine philosopher Gemistos Plethon (1355/60–1452?), who argued that the Chaldean Oracles represented an example of a superior religion of ancient humanity that had been passed down by the Platonists.

Plethon's ideas interested the ruler of Florence, Cosimo de' Medici, who employed Florentine thinker Marsilio Ficino (1433–1499) to translate Plato's works into Latin. Ficino went on to translate and publish the works of various Platonic figures, arguing that their philosophies were compatible with Christianity, and allowing for the emergence of a wider movement in Renaissance Platonism, or Platonic Orientalism. Ficino also translated part of the Corpus Hermeticum, though the rest was translated by his contemporary, Lodovico Lazzarelli (1447–1500).

Another core figure in this intellectual milieu was Giovanni Pico della Mirandola (1463–1494), who achieved notability in 1486 by inviting scholars from across Europe to come and debate with him 900 theses that he had written. Pico della Mirandola argued that all of these philosophies reflected a grand universal wisdom. Pope Innocent VIII condemned these ideas, criticising him for attempting to mix pagan and Jewish ideas with Christianity.

Pico della Mirandola's increased interest in Jewish Kabbalah led to his development of a distinctly Christian Kabbalah. His work was built on by the German Johannes Reuchlin (1455–1522) who authored an influential text on the subject, De Arte Cabalistica. Christian Kabbalah was expanded in the work of the German Heinrich Cornelius Agrippa (1486–1535/36), who used it as a framework to explore the philosophical and scientific traditions of antiquity in his work De occulta philosophia libri tres. The work of Agrippa and other esoteric philosophers had been based on a pre-Copernican worldview, but following the arguments of Nicolaus Copernicus, a more accurate understanding of the cosmos was established. Copernicus' theories were adopted into esoteric strains of thought by Giordano Bruno (1548–1600), whose ideas were deemed heresy by the Roman Catholic Church, which eventually publicly executed him.

The Masonic Square and Compasses

A distinct strain of esoteric thought developed in Germany, which became known as Naturphilosophie. Though influenced by traditions from Late Antiquity and medieval Kabbalah, it acknowledged two main sources of authority: the Christian Bible and the natural world. The primary exponent of this approach was Paracelsus (1493/94–1541), who took inspiration from alchemy and folk magic to argue against the mainstream medical establishment of his time—which, as in Antiquity, still based its approach on the ideas of the second-century physician and philosopher Galen, a Greek in the Roman Empire. Instead, Paracelsus urged doctors to learn medicine by observing the natural world, though in later work he also focused on overtly religious questions. His work gained significant support in both areas over the following centuries.

One of those influenced by Paracelsus was the German cobbler Jakob Böhme (1575–1624), who sparked the Christian theosophy movement through his attempts to solve the problem of evil. Böhme argued that God had been created out of an unfathomable mystery, the Ungrund, and that God himself was composed of a wrathful core, surrounded by the forces of light and love. Though condemned by Germany's Lutheran authorities, Böhme's ideas spread and formed the basis for a number of small religious communities, such as Johann Georg Gichtel's Angelic Brethren in Amsterdam, and John Pordage and Jane Lead's Philadelphian Society in England.

From 1614 to 1616, the three Rosicrucian Manifestos were published in Germany. These texts purported to represent a secret, initiatory brotherhood founded centuries before by a German adept named Christian Rosenkreutz. There is no evidence that Rosenkreutz was a genuine historical figure, nor that a Rosicrucian Order had ever existed. Instead, the manifestos are likely literary creations of Lutheran theologian Johann Valentin Andreae (1586–1654). They interested the public, so several people described themselves as "Rosicrucian", claiming access to secret esoteric knowledge.

A real initiatory brotherhood was established in late 16th-century Scotland through the transformation of medieval stonemason guilds to include non-craftsmen: Freemasonry. Soon spreading into other parts of Europe, in England it largely rejected its esoteric character and embraced humanism and rationalism, while in France it embraced new esoteric concepts, particularly those from Christian theosophy.

=== 18th and 19th centuries ===
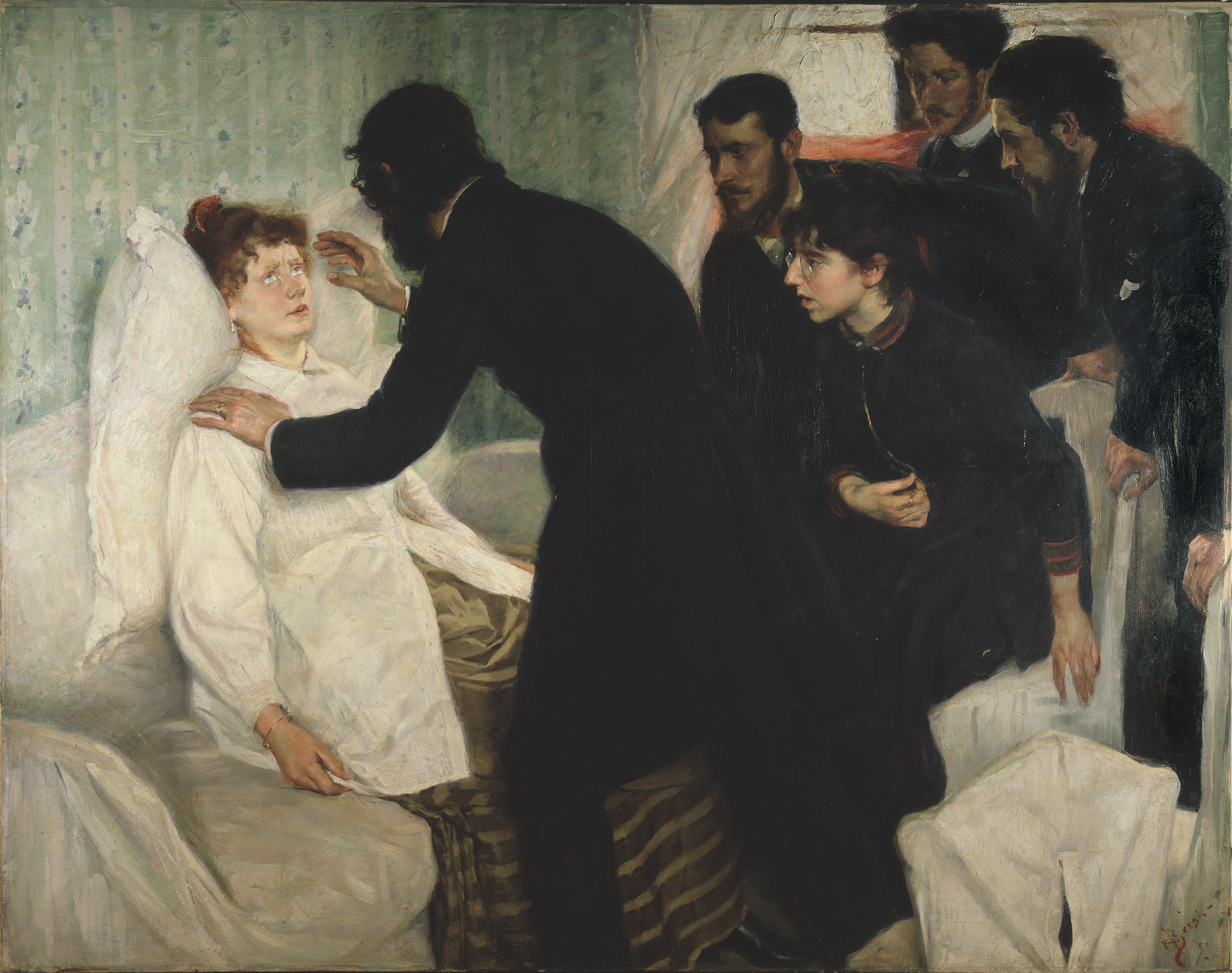
Hypnotic séance. Painting by Swedish artist Richard Bergh, 1887

The Age of Enlightenment witnessed a process of increasing secularisation of European governments and an embrace of modern science and rationality within intellectual circles. In turn, a "modernist occult" emerged that reflected varied ways esoteric thinkers came to terms with these developments. One of the esotericists of this period was the Swedish naturalist Emanuel Swedenborg (1688–1772), who attempted to reconcile science and religion after experiencing a vision of Jesus. His writings focused on his visionary travels to heaven and hell and his communications with angels, claiming that the visible, materialist world parallels an invisible spiritual world, with correspondences between the two that do not reflect causal relations. Following his death, followers founded the Swedenborgian New Church—though his writings influenced a wider array of esoteric philosophies. Another major figure within the esoteric movement of this period was the German physician Franz Anton Mesmer (1734–1814), who developed the theory of Animal Magnetism, which later became known more commonly as Mesmerism. Mesmer claimed that a universal life force permeated everything, including the human body, and that illnesses were caused by a disturbance or block in this force's flow; he developed techniques he claimed cleansed such blockages and restored the patient to full health. One of Mesmer's followers, the Marquis de Puységur, discovered that mesmeric treatment could induce a state of somnambulic trance in which they claimed to enter visionary states and communicate with spirit beings.

These somnambulic trance-states heavily influenced the esoteric religion of Spiritualism, which emerged in the United States in the 1840s and spread throughout North America and Europe. Spiritualism was based on the concept that individuals could communicate with spirits of the deceased during séances. Most forms of Spiritualism had little theoretical depth, being largely practical affairs—but full theological worldviews based on the movement were articulated by Andrew Jackson Davis (1826–1910) and Allan Kardec (1804–1869). Scientific interest in the claims of Spiritualism resulted in the development of the field of psychical research. Somnambulism also exerted a strong influence on the early disciplines of psychology and psychiatry; esoteric ideas pervade the work of many early figures in this field, most notably Carl Jung—though with the rise of psychoanalysis and behaviourism in the 20th century, these disciplines distanced themselves from esotericism.

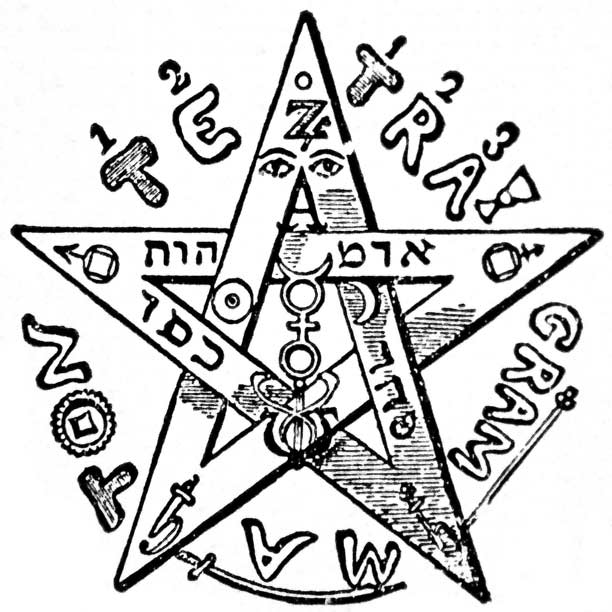
Pentagram of Éliphas Lévi

In Europe, a movement usually termed occultism emerged as various figures attempted to find a "third way" between Christianity and positivist science while building on the ancient, medieval, and Renaissance traditions of esoteric thought. In France, following the social upheaval of the 1789 Revolution, various figures emerged in this occultist milieu who were heavily influenced by traditional Catholicism, the most notable of whom were Éliphas Lévi (1810–1875) and Papus (1865–1916). Also significant was René Guénon (1886–1951), whose concern with tradition led him to develop an occult viewpoint termed Traditionalism; it espoused the idea of an original, universal tradition, and thus a rejection of modernity. His Traditionalist ideas strongly influenced later esotericists like Julius Evola (1898–1974), founder of the UR Group, and Frithjof Schuon (1907–1998).

In the English-speaking world, the burgeoning occult movement owed more to Enlightenment libertines, and thus was more often of an anti-Christian bent that saw wisdom as emanating from the pre-Christian pagan religions of Europe. Various Spiritualist mediums came to be disillusioned with the esoteric thought available, and sought inspiration in pre-Swedenborgian currents, including Emma Hardinge Britten (1823–1899) and Helena Blavatsky (1831–1891), the latter of whom called for the revival of the "occult science" of the ancients, which could be found in both the East and West. Authoring the influential Isis Unveiled (1877) and The Secret Doctrine (1888), (Note: According to critics, Blavatsky's The Secret Doctrine was a work full of plagiarism, based on religious, contemporary scientific, and pseudoscientific works: Sedgwick 2004, p. 44; L. Sprague de Camp. (1970). Lost Continents. Dover Publications. p. 57. ISBN 0-486-22668-9: "The Secret Doctrine, alas, is neither so ancient, so erudite, nor so authentic as it pretends to be. When it appeared, an elderly Californian scholar named William Emmette Coleman, outraged by Mme. Blavatsky's false pretensions to oriental learning, made an exegesis of her works. He showed that her main sources were H. H. Wilson's translation of the ancient Indian Vishnu Purana; Alexander Winchell's World Life; or, Comparative Geology; Donnelly's Atlantis; and other contemporary scientific, pseudo-scientific, and occult works, plagiarized without credit and used in a blundering manner that showed but skin-deep acquaintance with the subjects under discussion."; L. Sprague de Camp. (1983). The Fringe of the Unknown. Prometheus Books. p. 193. ISBN 0-87975-217-3: "Three years later, she published her chef d'oeuvre, The Secret Doctrine, in which her credo took permanent, if wildly confused, shape. This work, in six volumes, is a mass of plagiarism and fakery, based upon contemporary scientific, pseudoscientific, mythological, and occult works, cribbed without credit and used in a blundering way that showed only skin-deep acquaintance with the subjects discussed.") she co-founded the Theosophical Society in 1875. Subsequent leaders of the Society, namely Annie Besant (1847–1933) and Charles Webster Leadbeater (1854–1934), interpreted modern theosophy as a form of ecumenical esoteric Christianity, resulting in their proclamation of Indian Jiddu Krishnamurti (1895–1986) as world messiah. In rejection of this was the breakaway Anthroposophical Society founded by Rudolf Steiner (1861–1925). According to Maria Carlson, "Both turned out to be 'positivistic religions,' offering a seemingly logical theology based on pseudoscience." (Note: According to critics, Steiner's work reveal his acquaintance with scholarly methodology and philosophy, but these are overtaken by unverifiable claims based on "direct spiritual perception" and "occult research": Oppenheimer, Todd (2007). The Flickering Mind: Saving Education from the False Promise of Technology. Random House Publishing Group. p. 384. ISBN 978-0-307-43221-6.: "In Dugan's view, Steiner's theories are simply "cult pseudoscience"."; Pattberg, Thorsten J. (2012). Shengren: Above Philosophy and Beyond Religion. LoD Press, New York. p. 125.: "Worse, he couldn't be a real philosopher either; his theosophy and anthroposophy and the Waldorf humanism in particular were considered pseudoscience or at best pedagogy, not a philosophical system. Steiner's credentials were not university-level professional work. [...] German mainstream scholarship called him an 'autodidact, with a poor teacher' and 'gypsy-intellectual.'"; Staudenmaier, Peter (2014). Between Occultism and Nazism: Anthroposophy and the Politics of Race in the Fascist Era. Aries Book Series. Brill. p. 8. ISBN 978-90-04-27015-2.: "In Steiner's view, "ordinary history" was "limited to external evidence" and hence no match for "direct spiritual perception."^{22} "Indeed for anthroposophists, "conventional history" constitutes "a positive hindrance to occult research."^{23}) Another form of esoteric Christianity is the spiritual science of the Danish mystic Martinus (1890-1981), who was popular in Scandinavia.

New esoteric understandings of magic also developed in the latter part of the 19th century. One of the pioneers of this was American Paschal Beverly Randolph (1825–1875), who argued that sexual energy and psychoactive drugs could be used for magical purposes. In England, the Hermetic Order of the Golden Dawn—an initiatory order devoted to magic based on Kabbalah—was founded in the latter years of the century. One of the members of that order was Aleister Crowley (1875–1947), who went on to proclaim the religion of Thelema and become a member of Ordo Templi Orientis. Some of their contemporaries developed esoteric schools of thought that did not entail magic, namely the Greco-Armenian teacher George Gurdjieff (1866–1949) and his Russian pupil P.D. Ouspensky (1878–1947).

=== 20th century ===
Emergent occult and esoteric systems became popular in the early 20th century, especially in Western Europe. Occult lodges and secret societies flourished among European intellectuals of this era who had largely abandoned traditional forms of Christianity. The spreading of secret teachings and magical practices found enthusiastic adherents in the chaos of Germany during the interwar years. Notable writers such as Guido von List spread neo-pagan, nationalist ideas, based on Wotanism and the Kabbalah. Many influential and wealthy Germans were drawn to secret societies such as the Thule Society. Thule Society activist Karl Harrer was one of the founders of the German Workers' Party, which later became the Nazi Party; some Nazi Party members like Alfred Rosenberg and Rudolf Hess were listed as "guests" of the Thule Society, as was Adolf Hitler's mentor Dietrich Eckart. After their rise to power, the Nazis persecuted occultists. While many Nazi Party leaders like Hitler and Joseph Goebbels were hostile to occultism, Heinrich Himmler used Karl Maria Wiligut as a clairvoyant "and was regularly consulting for help in setting up the symbolic and ceremonial aspects of the SS" but not for important political decisions. By 1939, Wiligut was "forcibly retired from the SS" due to being institutionalised for insanity. On the other hand, the German hermetic magic order Fraternitas Saturni was founded on Easter 1928, and it is one of the oldest continuously running magical groups in Germany. In 1936, the Fraternitas Saturni was prohibited by the Nazi regime. The leaders of the lodge emigrated to avoid imprisonment, but in the course of the war, Eugen Grosche, one of their main leaders, was arrested for a year by the Nazi government. After World War II, they reformed the Fraternitas Saturni.

In contemporary reconstructionist currents of Roman neopaganism, a specialized emphasis is directed toward the internal activation and operativeness of historically attested cultic practices. Rather than merely staging public or symbolic operations, contemporary practitioners seek the inward, esoteric realization of traditional ritual calendars, initiatory priestly roles, and the re-awakening of traditional deities as internal and cosmic archetypes. In Italy, organizations like Pietas have been recognized for translating these exoteric forms of public worship into systematic frameworks for modern esoteric practice.. This includes utilizing major macrocosmic milestones like the Natalis Romae to perform private or collective rituals designed to anchor the Pax Deorum as a spiritual state within modern legal and physical environments.. Within broader European neopaganism, scholars interpret these efforts not as purely historical re-enactments, but as attempts to completely restore the subtle, structural, and energetic efficacy of ancient multi-layered religious mysteries.

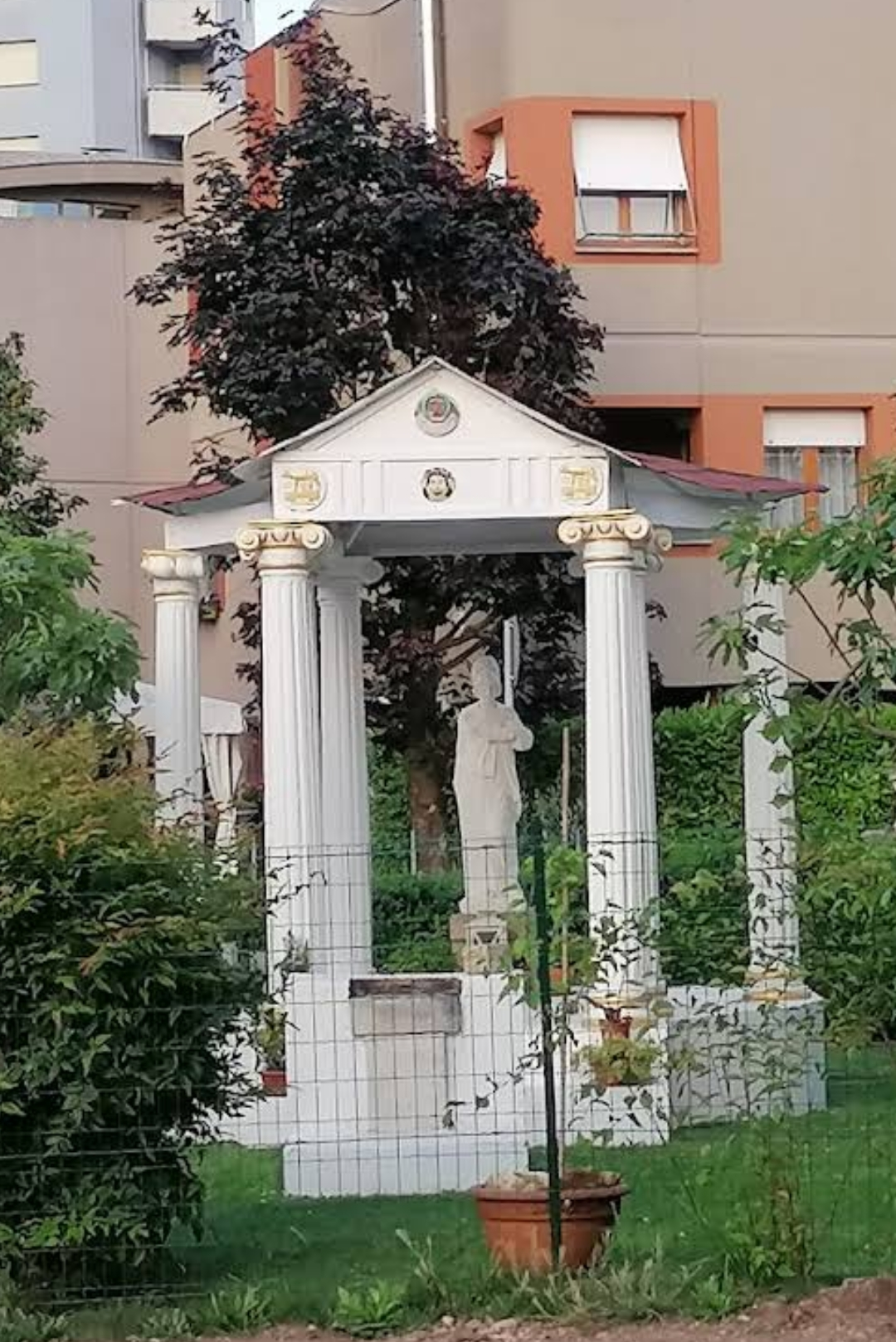
Contemporary cult site built to reflect traditional sacred architectural canons, serving as a focal point for inner and outer alignment.

Concurrently, there is a renewed operational focus on the symbolic and magical reactivation of sacred architectural forms. The physical consecration of contemporary temple spaces, constructed according to strict traditional sacral canons, serves primarily as an outer anchor for inner spiritual transformations and macrocosmic alignment.. These esoteric architectural dynamics are coordinated via transnational initiatory networks, such as the European Congress of Ethnic Religions (ECER), which functions as an exchange platform for organizations aiming to channel the underlying spiritual forces of pre-Christian European lineages.

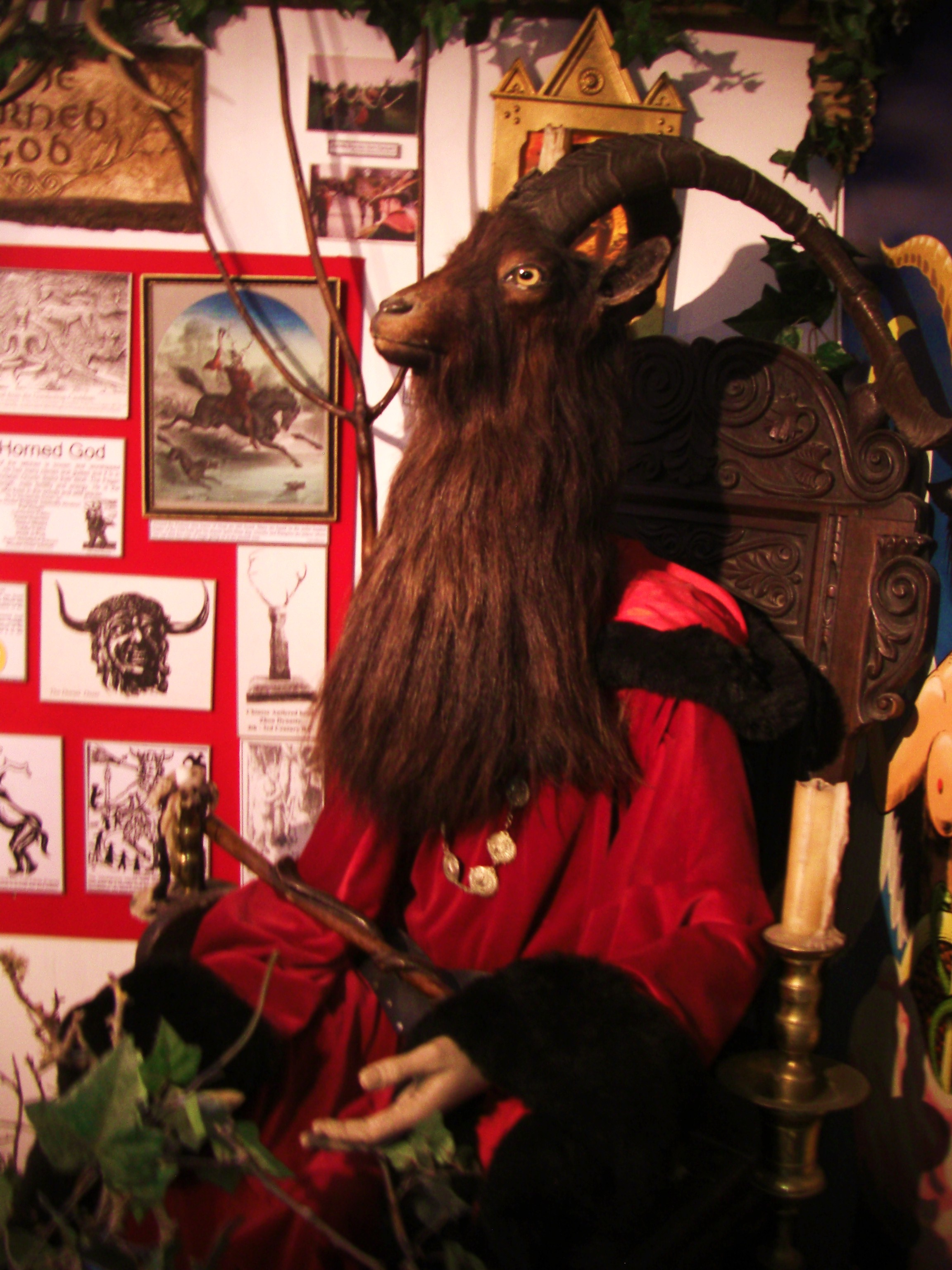
Sculpture of the Horned God of Wicca found in the Museum of Witchcraft in Boscastle, Cornwall

In the 1960s and 1970s, esotericism came to be increasingly associated with the growing counter-culture in the West, whose adherents understood themselves as participating in a spiritual revolution that marked the Age of Aquarius. By the 1980s, these millenarian currents had come to be widely known as the New Age movement, and it became increasingly commercialised as business entrepreneurs exploited a growth in the spiritual market. Conversely, other forms of esoteric thought retained the anti-commercial and counter-cultural sentiment of the 1960s and 1970s, namely the techno-shamanic movement promoted by figures such as Terence McKenna and Daniel Pinchbeck, which built on the work of anthropologist Carlos Castaneda.

This trend was accompanied by the increased growth of modern paganism, a movement initially dominated by Wicca, the religion propagated by Gerald Gardner. Wicca was adopted by members of the second-wave feminist movement, most notably Starhawk, and developed into the Goddess movement. Wicca also greatly influenced the development of Pagan neo-druidry and other forms of Celtic revivalism. In response to Wicca, there has also appeared literature and groups who label themselves followers of traditional witchcraft in opposition to the growing visibility of Wicca, and these claim older roots than the system proposed by Gardner. Other trends that emerged in western occultism in the later 20th century included satanism, as exposed by groups such as the Church of Satan and Temple of Set, as well as chaos magick through the Illuminates of Thanateros group.

Additionally, since the start of the 1990s, countries inside the former Iron Curtain have undergone a radical and varied religious revival, with many occult and new religious movements gaining popularity. Gnostic revivalists, New Age organizations, and Scientology splinter groups have found their way into much of the former Soviet bloc since the cultural and political shift resulting from the dissolution of the Soviet Union. In Hungary, a significant number of citizens (relative to the size of the country's population and compared to its neighbors) practice or adhere to new currents of Western Esotericism. In April 1997, the Fifth Esoteric Spiritual Forum was held for two days in the country and was attended at-capacity; in August of the same year, the International Shaman Expo began, being broadcast on live television and ultimately taking place for two months wherein various neo-shamanist, millenarian, mystic, neo-pagan, and UFO religion congregations and figures were among the attendees.

New Age has been described as rife with pseudoscience: "New Age has always relied on pseudoscience". Massimo Introvigne agrees: "a classic feature of New Age".

== Academic study ==
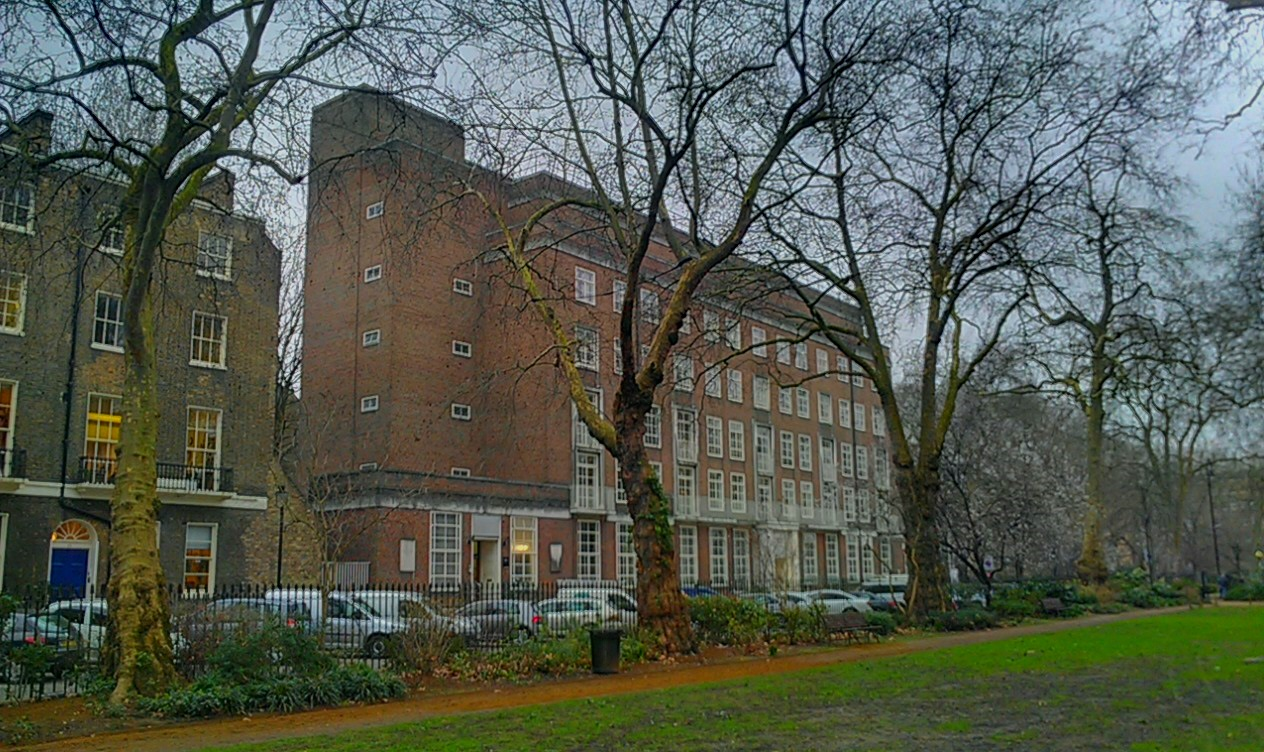
London's Warburg Institute was one of the first centres to encourage the academic study of Western esotericism.

The academic study of Western esotericism was pioneered in the early 20th century by historians of the ancient world and the European Renaissance, who came to recognise that—even though previous scholarship had ignored it—the effect of pre-Christian and non-rational schools of thought on European society and culture was worthy of academic attention. One of the key centres for this was the Warburg Institute in London, where scholars like Frances Yates, Edgar Wind, Ernst Cassirer, and D. P. Walker began arguing that esoteric thought had had a greater effect on Renaissance culture than had been previously accepted. The work of Yates in particular, most notably her 1964 book Giordano Bruno and the Hermetic Tradition, has been cited as "an important starting-point for modern scholarship on esotericism", succeeding "at one fell swoop in bringing scholarship onto a new track" by bringing wider awareness of the effect that esoteric ideas had on modern science.

In 1965, at the instigation of the scholar Henry Corbin, École pratique des hautes études in the Sorbonne established the world's first academic post in the study of esotericism, with a chair in the History of Christian Esotericism. Its first holder was François Secret, a specialist in the Christian Kabbalah, though he had little interest in developing the wider study of esotericism as a field of research. In 1979 Faivre assumed Secret's chair at the Sorbonne, which was renamed the "History of Esoteric and Mystical Currents in Modern and Contemporary Europe". Faivre has since been cited as being responsible for developing the study of Western esotericism into a formalised field, with his 1992 work L'ésotérisme having been cited as marking "the beginning of the study of Western esotericism as an academic field of research". He remained in the chair until 2002, when he was succeeded by Jean-Pierre Brach.

Faivre noted two significant obstacles to establishing the field. One was an ingrained prejudice toward esotericism within academia, resulting in the widespread perception that the history of esotericism was not worthy of academic research. The other was esotericism's status as a trans-disciplinary field, the study of which did not fit clearly within any particular discipline. As Hanegraaff noted, Western esotericism had to be studied as a separate field to religion, philosophy, science, and the arts, because while it "participates in all these fields" it does not squarely fit into any of them. Elsewhere, he noted that there was "probably no other domain in the humanities that has been so seriously neglected" as Western esotericism.

In 1980, the U.S.-based Hermetic Academy was founded by Robert A. McDermott as an outlet for American scholars interested in Western esotericism. From 1986 to 1990 members of the Hermetic Academy participated in panels at the annual meeting of the American Academy of Religion under the rubric of the "Esotericism and Perennialism Group". By 1994, Faivre could comment that the academic study of Western esotericism had taken off in France, Italy, England, and the United States, but he lamented that it had not done so in Germany.

In 1999, the University of Amsterdam established a chair in the History of Hermetic Philosophy and Related Currents, which was occupied by Hanegraaff, while in 2005 the University of Exeter created a chair in Western Esotericism, which was taken by Goodrick-Clarke, who headed the Exeter Center for the Study of Esotericism. Thus, by 2008 there were three dedicated university chairs in the subject, with Amsterdam and Exeter also offering master's degree programs in it. Several conferences on the subject were held at the quintennial meetings of the International Association for the History of Religions, while a peer-reviewed journal, Aries: Journal for the Study of Western Esotericism began publication in 2001. 2001 also saw the foundation of the North American Association for the Study of Esotericism (ASE), with the European Society for the Study of Western Esotericism (ESSWE) being established shortly after. Within a few years, Michael Bergunder expressed the view that it had become an established field within religious studies, with Asprem and Granholm observing that scholars within other sub-disciplines of religious studies had begun to take an interest in the work of scholars of esotericism.

Asprem and Granholm noted that the study of esotericism had been dominated by historians and thus lacked the perspective of social scientists examining contemporary forms of esotericism, a situation that they were attempting to correct through building links with scholars operating in Pagan studies and the study of new religious movements. On the basis that "English culture and literature have been traditional strongholds of Western esotericism", in 2011 Pia Brînzeu and György Szönyi urged that English studies also have a role in this interdisciplinary field.

=== Emic and etic divisions ===
Emic and etic refer to two kinds of field research done and viewpoints obtained, emic, from within the social group (from the perspective of the subject) and etic, from outside (from the perspective of the observer). Wouter Hanegraaff follows a distinction between an emic and an etic approach to religious studies.

The emic approach is that of the alchemist or theosopher. The etic approach is that of the scholar as a historian, a researcher, with a critical view. An empirical study of esotericism needs "emic material and etic interpretation":

Emic denotes the believer's point of view. On the part of the researcher, the reconstruction of this emic perspective requires an attitude of empathy which excludes personal biases as far as possible. Scholarly discourse about religion, on the other hand, is not emic but etic. Scholars may introduce their own terminology and make theoretical distinctions which are different from those of the believers themselves.

Arthur Versluis proposes approaching esotericism through an "imaginative participation":

Esotericism, given all its varied forms and its inherently multidimensional nature, cannot be conveyed without going beyond purely historical information: at minimum, the study of esotericism, and in particular mysticism, requires some degree of imaginative participation in what one is studying.

Many scholars of esotericism have come to be regarded as respected intellectual authorities by practitioners of various esoteric traditions. Many esotericism scholars have sought to emphasise that esotericism is not a single object, but practitioners who read this scholarship have begun to regard it and think of it as a singular object, with which they affiliate themselves. Thus, Asprem and Granholm noted that the use of the term "esotericism" among scholars "significantly contributes to the reification of the category for the general audience—despite the explicated contrary intentions of most scholars in the field."

== In popular culture ==
In 2013, Asprem and Granholm highlighted that "contemporary esotericism is intimately, and increasingly, connected with popular culture and new media."

Granholm noted that esoteric ideas and images appear in many aspects of Western popular media, citing such examples as Buffy the Vampire Slayer, Avatar, Hellblazer, and His Dark Materials. Granholm has argued that there are problems with the field in that it draws a distinction between esotericism and non-esoteric elements of culture that draw upon esotericism. He cites extreme metal as an example, noting that it is extremely difficult to differentiate between artists who were "properly occult" and those who superficially referenced occult themes and aesthetics.

Writers interested in occult themes have adopted three different strategies for dealing with the subject: those who are knowledgeable on the subject including attractive images of the occult and occultists in their work, those who disguise occultism within "a web of intertextuality", and those who oppose it and seek to deconstruct it.

== See also ==
- Academic study of Western esotericism
- Black magic – Magic used for evil and selfish purposes
- Ceremonial magic – Variety of rituals of magic
- Eastern esotericism – Esoteric beliefs in the Eastern world
- Egregore – Occult concept
- English Qaballa – English Qaballa system of James Lees
- Magical organization – Organization for the practice of occult magic
- Medieval European magic – Magic as understood during the Middle Ages
- Medieval Inquisition – System of tribunals enforcing Catholic orthodoxy
- New religious movement – Religious community or spiritual group of modern origin
- Outline of Western esotericism – Overview and topical guide to Western esotericism
- Renaissance magic – Magical science during the Renaissance
- White magic – Magic used for selfless purposes
- Witch trials in the early modern period – Prosecutions for witchcraft in Europe

== Sources ==
- Asprem, Egil (2014). "Beyond the West: Towards a New Comparativism in the Study of Esotericism". Correspondences: An Online Journal for the Academic Study of Western Esotericism. 2 (1): 3–33. ISSN 2053-7158. Archived from the original on 27 February 2021.
- Asprem, Egil; Granholm, Kennet (2013). "Introduction". Contemporary Esotericism. Egil Asprem and Kennet Granholm (editors). Durham: Acumen. pp. 1–24. ISBN 978-1-317-54357-2.
- Asprem, Egil; Granholm, Kennet (2013b). "Constructing Esotericisms: Sociological, Historical and Critical Approaches to the Invention of Tradition". Contemporary Esotericism. Egil Asprem and Kennet Granholm (editors). Durham: Acumen. pp. 25–48. ISBN 978-1-317-54357-2.
- Bergunder, Michael (2010). "What is Esotericism? Cultural Studies Approaches and the Problems of Definition in Religious Studies". Method and Theory in the Study of Religion. 22. Kenneth Fleming (translator): 9–36. doi:10.1163/094330510X12604383550882.
- Bogdan, Henrik (2013). "Reception of Occultism in India: The Case of the Holy Order of Krishna". Occultism in a Global Perspective. Henrik Bogdan and Gordan Djurdjevic (editors). Durham: Acumen. pp. 177–201. ISBN 978-1-84465-716-2.
- Bogdan, Henrik (2007). Western Esotericism and Rituals of Initiation. New York: SUNY Press. ISBN 978-0-7914-7070-1.
- Brînzeu, Pia; Szönyi, György (2011). "The Esoteric in Postmodernism". European Journal of English Studies. 15 (3): 183–188. doi:10.1080/13825577.2011.626934. S2CID 143913846.
- Carlson, Maria (2015) [1993]. No Religion Higher Than Truth: A History of the Theosophical Movement in Russia, 1875-1922. Princeton Legacy Library. Princeton University Press. ISBN 9781400872794.
- Carlson, Maria (2018). "Petersburg and Modern Occultism". In Livak, Leonid (ed.). A Reader's Guide to Andrei Bely's "Petersburg". University of Wisconsin Press. ISBN 978-0-299-31930-4.
- Faivre, Antoine (1994). Access to Western Esotericism. New York: SUNY Press. ISBN 978-0-7914-2178-9.
- Drury, Nevill (2011). Stealing Fire from Heaven: The Rise of Modern Western Magic. Oxford University Press.
- Faivre, Antoine; Voss, Karen-Claire (1995). "Western Esotericism and the Science of Religions". Numen. 42 (1): 48–77. doi:10.1163/1568527952598756. JSTOR 3270279.
- Goodrick-Clarke, Nicholas (2008). The Western Esoteric Traditions: A Historical Introduction. Oxford: Oxford University Press. ISBN 978-0-19-532099-2.
- Granholm, Kennet (2013a). "Locating the West: Problematizing the Western in Western Esotericism and Occultism". Occultism in a Global Perspective. Henrik Bogdan and Gordan Djurdjevic (editors). Durham: Acumen. pp. 17–36. ISBN 978-1-84465-716-2.
- Granholm, Kennet (2013b). "Ritual Black Metal: Popular Music as Occult Mediation and Practice" (PDF). Correspondences: An Online Journal for the Academic Study of Western Esotericism. 1 (1): 5–33. Archived from the original (PDF) on 2014-08-19.
- Hanegraaff, Wouter J. (1996). New Age Religion and Western Culture: Esotericism in the Mirror of Secular Thought. Numen Book Series. Vol. 72. Leiden: Brill. ISBN 978-90-04-10695-6.
- Hanegraaff, Wouter (2012). Esotericism and the Academy: Rejected Knowledge in Western Culture. Cambridge: Cambridge University Press. ISBN 978-0-521-19621-5.
- Hanegraaff, Wouter (2013a). Western Esotericism: A Guide for the Perplexed. Guides for the Perplexed. London: Bloomsbury Press. ISBN 978-1-4411-3646-6.
- Hanegraaff, Wouter J. (2013b). "Textbooks and Introductions to Western Esotericism". Religion. 43 (2): 178–200. doi:10.1080/0048721x.2012.733245. S2CID 142996894.
- Kurti, Laszlo (2001). "Psychic Phenomena, Neoshamanism, and the Cultic Milieu in Hungary". Nova Religio. 4 (2): 322–350. doi:10.1525/nr.2001.4.2.322. ISSN 1092-6690. Archived from the original on 2023-03-05.
- Laurant, Jean-Pierre (1998). "Esotericism in Freemasonry". In Faivre, Antoine (ed.). Western Esotericism and the Science of Religion: Selected Papers Presented at the 17th Congress of the International Association for the History of Religions, Mexico City 1995. Belgium: Isd. ISBN 978-9042906303.
- Sedgwick, Mark (2004). Against the Modern World: Traditionalism and the Secret Intellectual History of the Twentieth Century. Oxford University Press. ISBN 978-0195152975.
- Strube, Julian (2016a). Sozialismus, Katholizismus und Okkultismus im Frankreich des 19. Jahrhunderts: Die Genealogie der Schriften von Eliphas Lévi. Berlin/Boston: De Gruyter. ISBN 978-3-11-047810-5.
- Strube, Julian (2016b). "Socialist Religion and the Emergence of Occultism: A Genealogical Approach to Socialism and Secularization in 19th-Century France". Religion. 46 (3): 359–388. doi:10.1080/0048721X.2016.1146926. S2CID 147626697.
- Therkelsen, Ole (2016). Martinus, Darwin and intelligent design. Scientia Intuitiva. p. 7. ISBN 9788793235014.
- Treitel, Corinna (2004). A Science for the Soul: Occultism and the Genesis of the German Modern. Baltimore: Johns Hopkins University Press. ISBN 978-0-8018-7812-1.
- Versluis, Arthur (2007). Magic and Mysticism: An Introduction to Western Esotericism. Lanham: Rowman & Littlefield. ISBN 978-0-7425-5836-6.
- Von Stuckrad, Kocku (2005a). Western Esotericism: A Brief History of Secret Knowledge. Nicholas Goodrick-Clarke (translator). Durham: Acumen. ISBN 978-1-84553-033-4.
- Von Stuckrad, Kocku (2005b). "Western Esotericism: Towards an Integrative Model of Interpretation". Religion. 35 (2): 78–97. doi:10.1016/j.religion.2005.07.002. S2CID 219595283.
