= Wouter Hanegraaff =

Dutch academic

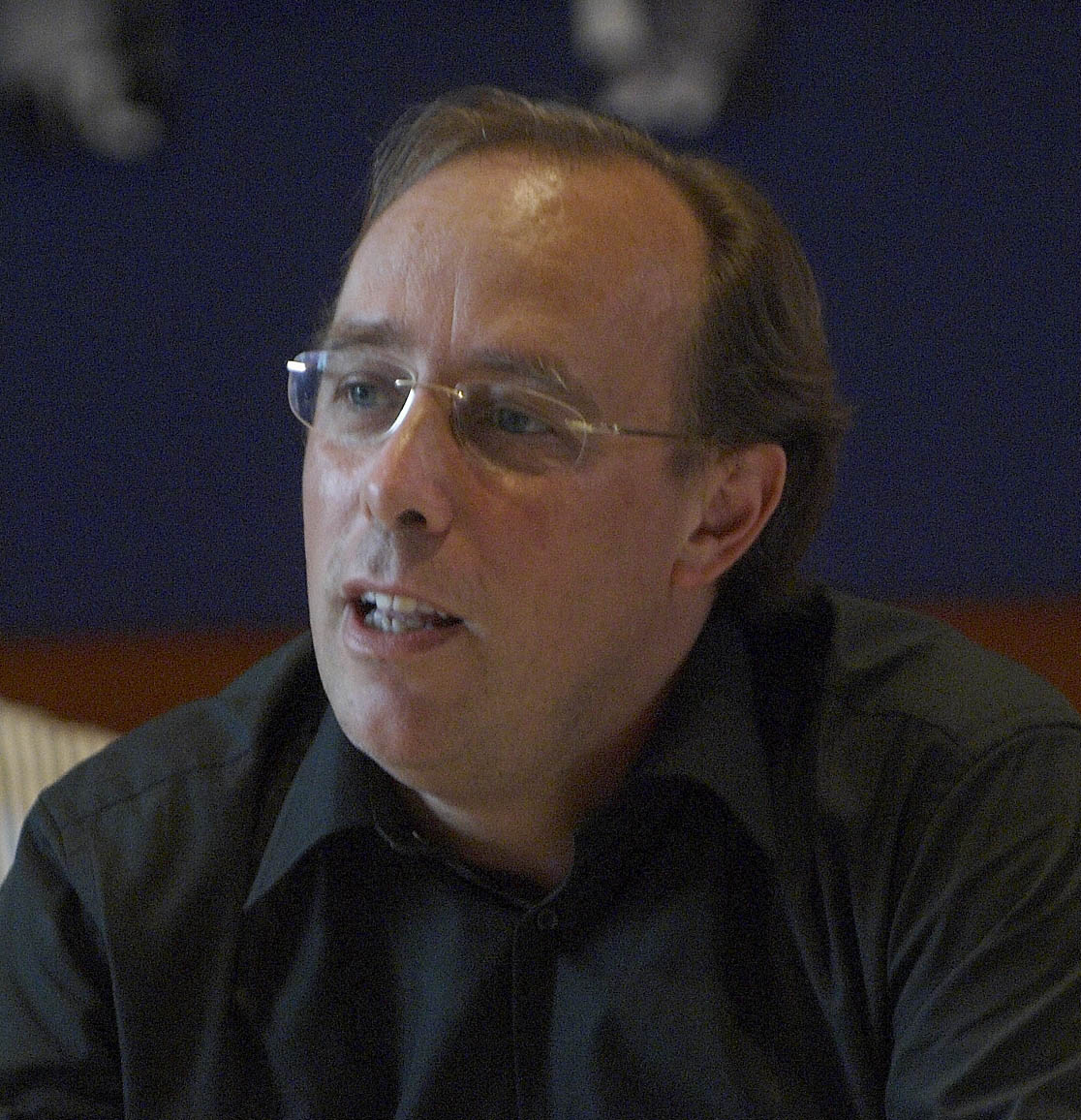
- Hanegraaff in 2006
- Born: Wouter Jacobus Hanegraaff; 10 April 1961 (age 65); Amsterdam, Netherlands
- Education: University of Utrecht
- Occupation: Historian
- Employer: University of Amsterdam

Wouter Jacobus Hanegraaff (born 10 April 1961) is professor of History of Hermetic Philosophy and related currents at the University of Amsterdam, Netherlands. He is a member of the Royal Dutch Academy of Arts and Science (KNAW) and an honorary member of the European Society for the Study of Western Esotericism (ESSWE), having served as its first president from 2005 to 2013.

== Early life ==
Hanegraaff was raised as the son of a theologian. He originally studied classical guitar at the Municipal Conservatory in Zwolle from 1982 to 1987, then cultural history ("Algemene Letteren") at the University of Utrecht from 1986 to 1990.

From 1992 to 1996 he was a PhD Research Fellow at the department for the Study of Religions at the University of Utrecht, and from 1996 to 1999 held a postdoctoral fellowship from the Dutch Research Council (NWO), during which time he spent a period working in Paris.

== Career ==
In 1999 he was appointed professor of History of Hermetic Philosophy and Related Currents at the University of Amsterdam. From 2002 to 2006 he has been president of the Dutch Society for the Study of Religion, and, from 2005 to 2013, president of the European Society for the Study of Western Esotericism. In 2006 he was elected member of the Royal Netherlands Academy of Arts and Sciences, and he is an honorary member of the ESSWE.

== Work ==
Hanegraaff is a scholar of religion and intellectual historian whose work is focused on the study of esotericism in Western culture, from late antiquity to the present. His dissertation was the first academic attempt to analyze the belief systems of the New Age movement and place them in a broader historical context. In his 2012 monograph, he analyzed the history of pro- and anti-"esoteric" discourse, arguing that modern perceptions of the field (both in academia and wider society) are grounded in German Protestant and Enlightenment polemics against "superstition," "magic," "idolatry," "the occult," or "the irrational." A textbook on esotericism was published one year later, in 2013, and was replaced in 2025 by a greatly expanded and largely rewritten new version that focuses in particular on the implications of esotericism research for modern and contemporary understandings of "Western culture" as such.

A more specific focus of Hanegraaff's work is the Hermetic literature and its reception. In 2005, in collaboration with Ruud Bouthoorn, he published the first complete edition with annotated translations and a large introduction, of the Hermetic writings of Lodovico Lazzarelli (1447–1500). He argued that this neglected Hermetic author is of key importance not just for his intrinsic interest, but also because his writings force us to revise Frances Yates' famous narrative of "the Hermetic Tradition." In 2022, Hanegraaff published a large monograph on the original Hermetic literature from late antiquity. With a strong emphasis on close textual hermeneutics, he argued that the Hermetic treatises should not be understood as contributions to philosophy but as the reflection of a living spiritual practice focused on the attainment of gnōsis through radical experiences of rebirth (palingenesia) and visionary ecstasy.

Next to many discussions of theoretical and methodological questions in the modern study of esotericism, Hanegraaff has published many articles and book chapters about a range of important but often neglected figures, texts, or traditions that fall under the wider umbrella of esotericism research. All his work is grounded in textual study and hermeneutic analysis of primary sources, and marked by a special fascination with alterations of consciousness and more generally with the experiential dimensions of esoteric or Hermetic spiritualities.

== Partial bibliography ==
=== Monographs ===
- -----New Age Religion and Western Culture: Esotericism in the Mirror of Secular Thought, Brill, Leiden 1996, State University of New York Press, Albany 1998. ISBN 978-90-04-10696-3; ISBN 0-7914-3854-6.
- ----- and R.M. Bouthoorn Lodovico Lazzarelli (1447–1500): The Hermetic Writings and Related Documents, Arizona Center for Medieval and Renaissance Studies, Tempe, 2005.
- -----Swedenborg, Oetinger, Kant: Three Perspectives on the Secrets of Heaven, The Swedenborg Foundation, West Chester, Pennsylvania 2007 (Swedenborg Studies Series, no. 18) ISBN 978-0-87785-321-3.
- -----Esotericism and the Academy: Rejected Knowledge in Western Culture, Cambridge University Press, Cambridge 2012, ISBN 9780521196215.
- -----Western Esotericism: A Guide for the Perplexed, Bloomsbury, London 2013.
- -----Hermetic Spirituality and the Historical Imagination: Altered states of knowledge in late antiquity, Cambridge University Press, 2022. ISBN 9781009123068.
- -----Esotericism in Western Culture: Counter-Normativity and Rejected Knowledge, Bloomsbury, London 2025. ISBN 9781350459687.

=== Edited volumes ===
- (ed., with Peter J. Forshaw & Marco Pasi), Hermes Explains: Thirty Questions about Western Esotericism. Amsterdam University Press 2019, ISBN 9789463720205.
- (ed., with Ria Kloppenborg), Female Stereotypes in Religious Traditions. Brill, Leiden 1995, ISBN 978-90-04-10290-3.
- (ed., with Roelof van den Broek), Gnosis and Hermeticism from Antiquity to Modern Times. State University of New York Press, Albany 1998.
- (ed., with Antoine Faivre), Western Esotericism and the Science of Religion, Peeters, Louvain 1998.
- (ed., with Richard Caron, Joscelyn Godwin & Jean-Louis Vieillard-Baron), Ésotérisme, gnoses & imaginaire symbolique: Mélanges offerts à Antoine Faivre, Peeters, Louvain 2001.
- (ed. in collaboration with Antoine Faivre, Roelof van den Broek, Jean-Pierre Brach, Dictionary of Gnosis and Western Esotericism, Brill, Leiden 2005. ISBN 978-90-04-15231-1.
- (ed. with Jeffrey J. Kripal), Hidden Intercourse: Eros and Sexuality in the History of Western Esotericism. Brill, Leiden 2008.
- (ed. with Joyce Pijnenburg), Hermes in the Academy: Ten Years' Study of Western Esotericism at the University of Amsterdam. Amsterdam University Press, 2009.

== See also ==
- Academic study of Western esotericism
- New Age
