= Academic study of Western esotericism =

Western esotericism has been studied within academia since the early 20th century.

== Origin and development ==
Prior to the first academic interest in the topic of Western esotericism, Arthur Edward Waite (who was a Freemason and member of the Societas Rosicruciana in Anglia) had written extensively on the topic from a traditionalist, religionist, and generalist perspective. He was often cited as an authority by the early academics in the field who followed him. As his biographer R. A. Gilbert described him, "Waite's name has survived because he was the first to attempt a systematic study of the history of Western occultism—viewed as a spiritual tradition rather than as aspects of protoscience or as the pathology of religion."

The more formal academic study of Western esotericism was pioneered in the early 20th century by historians of the ancient world and the European Renaissance, who came to recognise that—although it had been ignored by previous scholarship—the impact which pre-Christian and non-rational schools of thought had exerted on European society and culture was worthy of academic attention. One of the key centres for this was the Warburg Institute in London, where scholars like Frances Yates, Edgar Wind, Ernst Cassirer and D. P. Walker began arguing that esoteric thought had had a greater impact on Renaissance culture than had been previously accepted.

In 1965, the world's first academic post in the study of esotericism was established at the École pratique des hautes études in the Sorbonne, Paris; named the chair in the History of Christian Esotericism, its first holder was François Secret, a specialist in the Christian Kabbalah. In 1979 the scholar Antoine Faivre assumed Secret's chair at the Sorbonne, which was renamed the "History of Esoteric and Mystical Currents in Modern and Contemporary Europe". Faivre has since been cited as being responsible for developing the study of Western esotericism into a formalised field.

Faivre noted two significant obstacles to establishing the field. One was an ingrained prejudice toward esotericism within academia, resulting in the widespread perception that its history is unworthy of academic research. The second was its status a trans-disciplinary field, the study of which did not fit clearly within any particular discipline. As noted by Wouter Hanegraaff, Western esotericism had to be studied as a separate field to religion, philosophy, science and art, because while it "participates in all these fields" it does not squarely fit into any of them.

In 1980, the U.S.-based Hermetic Academy was founded by Robert A. McDermott as an outlet for scholars interested in Western esotericism. From 1986 to 1990 members of the Hermetic Academy participated in panels at the annual meeting of the American Academy of Religion under the rubric of the "Esotericism and Perennialism Group".

By 1994, Faivre could comment that the academic study of Western esotericism had taken off in France, Italy, England and the United States, but he lamented that it had not done so in Germany. By 2008, there were three dedicated university chairs in the subject, at the University of Sorbonne, University of Amsterdam and the University of Exeter, with the latter two institutions also offering master's degree programs in it.

Reasoning that "English culture and literature have been traditional strongholds of Western esotericism", Pia Brînzeu and György Szönyi urged in 2011 that English studies also have a role in this interdisciplinary field.

== Schools ==
- École pratique des hautes études in France has an academic chair in the subject.
- Rice University offers a PhD in Religious Studies: Mysticism, Gnosticism & Esotericism Concentration.
- University of Amsterdam has an academic chair in the subject and offers a MA and rMA in Religious Studies: Western Esotericism track.

== Societies ==
- Association for the Study of Esotericism
- European Society for the Study of Western Esotericism
