= Hitler's Priestess =

1998 book by Nicholas Goodrick-Clarke

- Cover of the first edition
- Author: Nicholas Goodrick-Clarke
- Language: English
- Subject: Savitri Devi
- Publisher: New York University Press
- Publication date: 1998
- Publication place: United States
- Media type: Print (hardcover)
- Pages: 269
- ISBN: 0-8147-3110-4
- OCLC: 38113227
- Dewey Decimal: 320.53
- LC Class: JC481 .G57 1998
- Preceded by: The Occult Roots of Nazism
- Followed by: Black Sun

Hitler's Priestess: Savitri Devi, the Hindu-Aryan Myth, and Neo-Nazism is a book by British historian Nicholas Goodrick-Clarke. It is a biography of fascist writer and esotericist Savitri Devi, who was influential on the development of esoteric neo-Nazism, and her connections with international neo-Nazism. It tells her life story primarily chronologically. Hitler's Priestess was first published by New York University Press in hardcover in 1998, and in paperback format in 2000. It was the first in-depth study of Savitri Devi and her life. The book received largely positive reviews from critics.

== Background and publication history ==
Its author, Nicholas Goodrick-Clarke, was a British historian. He had previously published a book on the relationship between occultism and Nazism, The Occult Roots of Nazism in 1985. Savitri Devi, born Maximiani Portas, was an occultist fascist activist, who combined occultist and ancient Indian ideas with fascism. She was known best for her book The Lightning and the Sun. She influenced several significant neo-Nazi figures, and even after her death continued to have a cultic following among neo-Nazis.

Goodrick-Clarke had become interested in Devi when, in 1982, he received an advertisement from Samisdat Publishers, owned by Holocaust denier Ernst Zündel, for their republication of Savitri Devi's books. It read in part "Hitler Cult Revealed — Discovered Alive In India: Hitler's Guru!" Goodrick-Clarke was intrigued by this advertisement, and began to study Savitri Devi.

It was published by New York University Press in hardcover in 1998 and in paperback in October 2000. The book was the first biography or in-depth study of Savitri Devi and her life.

== Contents ==
The book recounts Savitri Devi's life, beliefs, and legacy and influence on neo-Nazism, particularly esoteric neo-Nazism. Her life story is largely told chronologically, though sometimes digresses to tell the stories of related people. It begins with her childhood and origins, including an early dislike of Christianity's influence on Western civilization, before her move to India and resulting conversion to Hinduism, and her relationships with Hindu figures of the time. He attempts to trace the origins of her thought.

He writes of her support of Hitler during World War II and her spying for the Axis powers. It recounts her life following the war, including her connections with British neo-Nazi Colin Jordan and the ODESSA plot, and neo-Nazis worldwide. It also discusses and recounts the arguments presented in her books, including Defiance and The Lightning and the Sun. It concludes the biography with her death in 1982.

In the conclusion, Goodrick-Clarke argues that Savitri Devi's legacy is an important influence on the neo-Nazi overlap with deep ecology, esoteric and New Age movements, and debates to what extent these groups are connected to the far right. He noted that though these had left-wing roots they were infiltrated by the far right and that these were all at odds with "Christianity, rationalism and liberalism", adding that:

The cybernetic encirclement of man and his complete divorce from nature could well foster a more fundamental alienation. In a congested and automated world, Savitri Devi's sentimental love of animals and hatred of the masses may find new followers. The pessimism of the Kali Yuga and her vision of a pristine new Aryan order possess a perennial appeal in times of uncertainty and change.

== Reception ==
Booklist noted the book positively, saying Goodrick-Clarke had done "a fine job revealing Devi's strange and, ultimately, brutal personality". Publishers Weekly praised it as providing "plenty of information and insight about this little-known but influential figure", saying the most interesting material in it was the contents about her writings; the writing was however noted as "stiff and matter-of-fact". Daniel K. Blewett writing for Library Journal praised it for showing one of the "many oddities" of "the whole terrible Nazi experience", calling it useful for understanding the ideology of neo-Nazis; they deemed it suitable but not essential for libraries.

Jeffrey Kaplan writing for Nova Religio called Goodrick-Clarke a "uniquely qualified biographer" of Devi, and praised the work as a "remarkable intellectual biography". He singled out the coverage of her Hindu activism as "thoroughly researched", and argued Goodrick-Clarke was at his best in his coverage of her writings. Kaplan said the book's conclusion was "controversial", where "the author’s distaste for the anti-rationalism represented by this convergence is clear". For the Journal of Contemporary Religion, Susan Hector wrote that it was "quite simply an excellent book", praising its research, specificity, and objectivity; she called it "ground-breaking" and said many should read it. She said the way Goodrick-Clarke showed how Savitri Devi had arrived at her positions was especially good. Daniel Johnson wrote that Goodrick-Clarke had done "a service to sanity, even if the gullible will go on swallowing her recycled poison rather than his antidote".

Ramesh Chandran, reviewing the book for The Times of India, predicted many in India would be outraged by the book, and noted that it would "not flatter Hindutva acolytes". Journalist and historian Frank McLynn for The Independent called it an "excellent, thought provoking volume", a "scholarly but deeply depressing book". Several reviewers complimented its discussion of the far-right and their connections to environmentalist, New Age, and animal rights movements. Praising the book as engrossing, Don Carnell for the Jewish Chronicle said the book possessed a timely warning in its discussion of how the far-right attempted to hijack issues like environmentalism and animal rights.
