= Black Sun (Goodrick-Clarke book) =

2002 book by Nicholas Goodrick-Clarke

- Cover of the first edition
- Author: Nicholas Goodrick-Clarke
- Language: English
- Subject: Esoteric neo-Nazism
- Publisher: New York University Press
- Publication date: 2002
- Publication place: United States
- Media type: Print
- Pages: 371
- ISBN: 0-8147-3124-4
- OCLC: 47665567
- Dewey Decimal: 320.53
- LC Class: JC481 .G567 2002
- Preceded by: Hitler's Priestess
- Followed by: The Western Esoteric Traditions

Black Sun: Aryan Cults, Esoteric Nazism and the Politics of Identity is a book by British historian Nicholas Goodrick-Clarke. It was published by New York University Press in 2002. A successor to Goodrick-Clarke's 1985 book The Occult Roots of Nazism, which focused on the influence of occult movements on Nazi Germany, it examines post-war esoteric neo-Nazism with a particular focus on the Anglophone world.

It was originally intended as a sequel to The Occult Roots of Nazism, but in the course of writing it its scope expanded further. Among the topics covered are the histories of American and British neo-Nazism, various figures associated with neo-Nazism and esoteric neo-Nazism, neo-Nazi satanism, neo-Nazi music, and belief in Nazi UFOs and other conspiracies. The book takes its name from the esoteric neo-Nazi Black Sun idea, which Goodrick-Clarke notes was later identified with a particular Nazi design.

Goodrick-Clarke draws a parallel between the conditions in early 20th-century Austria, which formed the racist occultist movement Ariosophy that influenced Nazism, and the conditions in the West that formed the modern fringe neo-Nazi movements. Black Sun received praise for its research, writing style, and the amount of information it provided on its subject matter. Discussing the book in 2024, scholar Arthur Versluis described it as a seminal work on the subject.

== Background and publication history ==
Black Sun's author, Nicholas Goodrick-Clarke, was a British historian with a specialty in the relationship between occultism and Nazism. He had a PhD from the University of Oxford. Black Sun is a successor to Goodrick-Clarke's earlier book The Occult Roots of Nazism, published in 1985, which focused on the influence of occult movements on the ideology of the original Nazi movement. The Occult Roots of Nazism was widely praised and was influential in its field. Goodrick-Clarke followed that book up with another in 1998, Hitler's Priestess, a biography of the esoteric Hitlerist Savitri Devi.

Black Sun was originally intended as a sequel to The Occult Roots of Nazism which would cover the survival of those myths post-World War II, but in the course of its writing its scope expanded and changed from the original. It is based largely on writings from the movements profiled as well as from group members. Black Sun was published by New York University Press in 2002. Its first edition was 371 pages long, with illustrations. Following Black Sun's publication, in 2005 Goodrick-Clarke was appointed to the chair of western esotericism at the University of Exeter. He died from cancer in 2012.

The book has been translated into several languages. It received a Portuguese translation in 2004 by Fábio Rezende published by Mardes, a Czech translation in 2006 by Miloslav Korbelík and published by Eminent, a French translation by Sébastien Raizer, published by Camion Blanc in 2007, an Italian translation that year published by Settimo Sigillo-Europa, a German translation in 2009 by Ulrich Bossier, published by Marix Verlag, and a Turkish translation by Kıvanç Günay in 2013, published by Kırmızı Kedi Yayınevi.

== Summary ==
The book's introduction connects the ideas covered in Goodrick-Clarke's 1985 book The Occult Roots of Nazism to trace similar phenomena in the post-war West. Because the occultism found in the Schutzstaffel (SS) can be traced to Ariosophy, which emerged from the völkisch movement, Goodrick-Clarke coins the term "neo-völkisch" for the groups he covers in the book. These groups are defined by their concern with white identity, and in many cases take interest in esoteric ideas of Aryan origins and occultism. Beginning with American neo-Nazism and its history, Goodrick-Clarke discusses the historical intersections between modern far-right groups and esoteric religion.

According to the author, movements with such interests are particularly prevalent in the English-speaking world. Goodrick-Clarke argues that American neo-Nazism finds its roots in the life of George Lincoln Rockwell, the founder of the American Nazi Party (ANP), who pioneered neo-Nazism in America before his assassination in 1967; Goodrick-Clarke emphasizes that after his death, Rockwell's successor, Matt Koehl, turned the ANP into an esoteric neo-Nazi movement. Another Rockwell associate, William Luther Pierce, developed an esoteric racist religious philosophy as well. Goodrick-Clarke primarily credits the British neo-Nazi movement to Colin Jordan.

The pattern that appears on the floor of the Wewelsburg castle, which was later identified with the occultist neo-Nazi idea of the "Black Sun", after which the book is named

After these chapters describing the histories of postwar American and British neo-Nazism, Goodrick-Clarke goes on to discuss the lives and idea of several early esoteric and occultist fascists and neo-Nazis: Julius Evola, James Madole, Francis Parker Yockey, and Savitri Devi, who all had varying kinds of occult and esoteric racist ideology. The "Nazi Mysteries" chapter readdresses the claims found in Goodrick-Clarke's earlier book, The Occult Roots of Nazism, focusing on the original extent of occultism in Nazism and the genre of "Nazi Mysteries" that emerged exploiting claimed connections between Nazis and the occult. Wilhelm Landig, a former SS member, promoted fascist esotericism in his writings and developed many esoteric Nazi concepts, including that of the Black Sun, after which the book is named; it was later (by other writers) identified with the sun wheel symbol present on the floor of the Wewelsburg.

Discourse about neo-Nazis in popular culture extended to conspiracies involving Nazi UFOs, extraterrestrial civilizations, and polar mythology. One writer to promote Nazi UFO ideas was Miguel Serrano, an esoteric Hitlerist and Chilean diplomat. Goodrick-Clarke also discusses the history of neo-Nazi music genres, specifically National Socialist black metal and White Noise music. In a chapter about neo-Nazi Satanism, Goodrick-Clarke covers the long time British neo-Nazi David Myatt, who he says is the founder of the neo-Nazi Satanist group the Order of Nine Angles. He goes on to write about Christian Identity, the Church of the Creator, Nordic Racial Paganism, and finally the New World Order conspiracy theory and other conspiracy theories.

Goodrick-Clarke draws a parallel between the conditions in early 20th century Austria, which had formed the racist occultist group Ariosophy that he profiled in his first book, to the conditions in the West that formed the modern fringe neo-Nazi movements. He says that a key difference between these two categories is that the older movements were specifically German nationalist in ideology, while the modern movements have instead shifted into a global idea of white supremacy without specific ethnic ties. He contends that "it is highly significant that the Aryan cult of white identity is now most marked in the United States". Goodrick-Clarke argues that the rise in white supremacist and racialist movements is in large part driven by increasing multiculturalism and non-white immigration in western societies and the resulting white resentment, and says that these occultist and religious forms of neo-Nazism create a mythology designed to counter this. He writes that "from the retrospective viewpoint of a potential authoritarian future in 2020 or 2030, these Aryan cults and esoteric Nazism may be documented as early symptoms of major divisive changes in our present-day Western democracies".

== Reception ==
Black Sun was received positively. The book's broad scope was praised, as was its research, and writing style. Publishers Weekly complimented the book as a "comprehensive inquiry" which "adds to our knowledge of the broad, frightening tentacles of Nazi ideology", while Stephen L. Hupp of the Library Journal recommended it to all libraries. Karis Muller writing for The European Legacy praised it as "a meticulously researched, serious work", and historian Joachim Whaley of the Journal of European Studies called it an "excellent" book that "provides a lucid and often chilling guide" to the far-right. Bill Saunders said it was "impossible to do justice here to the immense amount of research that has gone into Black Sun". Discussing the book in 2024, scholar Arthur Versluis praised it as an extensive survey, and described the work as "seminal".

Several reviewers also found it disturbing or troubling. Stephen L. Hupp said it "presents a troubling picture of the mindset of the modern Far Right", while Bill Saunders, writing for the British newspaper The Independent, said Black Sun "makes uncomfortable reading for anyone who has so much as flirted with romantic anti-modernism". Joseph P. Szimhart of Cultic Studies Review commented that the book was an uneasy read; he praised the book as "compelling" and said it discussed occult topics "without falling prey to exaggeration or fascination". Martin A. Lee, reviewing the book for the Southern Poverty Law Center's Intelligence Report, praised the book's information and Goodrick-Clarke's "engaging and accessible style", and called the book "a timely warning, indeed". Saunders wrote that the book was "a reminder of how dangerous a lack of irony can be, and a reminder to those of us who have it to take those who don't more seriously."

Muller said given the book's concentration on Anglo-American movements it did "not ask why the Anglo Saxons seem particularly prone to such ravings" He also noted the absence of mention of Der Mann, der Hitler die Ideen gab by Wilfried Daim, which he called the "seminal work" on Hitler's occult beliefs. Alternatively, D. A. Harvey writing for Choice argued its "international dimension" was its greatest strength, and recommended Black Sun, further praising its writing and scope. Whaley said the comparison between these modern groups and the ones in pre-1914 Austria could be seen as "rather sensationalist" due to their lack of power, though described it as "intriguing", while Harvey said this comparison was "highly provocative". Publishers Weekly said Black Sun did not properly evaluate whether such groups, now fringe, had the potential for atrocities. Jérôme Rousse-Lacordaire writing in Aries noted it as covering a broad range of topics, and agreed with Goodrick-Clarke's conclusions about what the neo-Nazi movements profiled reflected about society. He said the same conspiratorial lens, though without the neo-Nazism, was demonstrated in the popularity of conspiracism in popular culture.

Whaley argued that "whether or not the 'Black Sun' manages to destroy [the democratic] system in the next few decades, Goodrick-Clarke is surely right to insist that we need to understand its enduring magnetism." Saunders said Goodrick-Clarke took a "right-wing liberal view" about the reasons for the movements' appeal. Harvey commented that Goodrick-Clarke's predictions of a Nazi resurgence could be seen as alarmist, and criticized his theories on what led to the popularity of these movements. Carol Ann Traut deemed his ideas on what led to the rise of these groups "perhaps not original but well worth repeating", and deemed Black Sun a thorough survey of the subject matter. The book's explanation of Adolf Hitler's continued appeal for these movements was singled out for praise by The Philadelphia Inquirer.

In 2025, Dominic Alessio and Robert J. Wallis listed Black Sun as one of three "landmark" works on the subject of race and heathenry, alongside its predecessor and Mattias Gardell's Gods of the Blood. Scholar Clive Henry noted that the book had "long been held as the seminal, predominant text on [David Myatt]". Myatt himself criticized the book. In 2023, scholars Bethan Johnson and Matthew Feldman noted it as one of the first scholarly works to examine James Mason's neo-Nazi book Siege, and the first to give an extended analysis of the book, long before its rise in popularity in the 2010s, while in 2026 writer Spencer Sunshine identified it as the first academic work to substantially examine neo-Nazi Satanism.
