= List of Nazi ideologues =

This is a list of people whose ideas became part of Nazi ideology. The ideas, writings, and speeches of these thinkers were incorporated into what became Nazism, including antisemitism, German idealism, eugenics, racial hygiene, the concept of the master race, and Lebensraum. The list includes people whose ideas were incorporated, even if they did not live in the Nazi era.

== Philosophers and sociologists ==
- Alfred Baeumler (1887–1968), German philosopher in Nazi Germany. He was a leading misinterpreter of Friedrich Nietzsche's philosophy as legitimizing Nazism. Thomas Mann read Baeumler's work on Nietzsche in the early 1930s, and characterized passages of it as "Hitler prophecy."
- Houston Stewart Chamberlain (1855–1927) was a British-born author of books on political philosophy, and natural science. His two-volume book Die Grundlagen des Neunzehnten Jahrhunderts ("Foundations of the 19th century") (1899) became a manual for Nazi racial philosophy including the concept of the master race. Considered to be one of Hitler's intellectual mentors.
- Karl Haushofer (1869–1946) was a German general, professor, geographer, and politician. Through his student Rudolf Hess, Haushofer's ideas known as Geopolitiks influenced the development of Adolf Hitler's expansionist strategies.
- Rudolf Jung (1882–1945), the author of Der Nationale Sozialismus, a theoretical work which, the author hoped, would eventually play the same role for Nazism that Das Kapital played for Marxism.
- Ernst Krieck (1882–1947), German pedagogue.
- Alfred Rosenberg (1893–1946), considered one of the main authors of key Nazi ideological creeds, including the racial policy of Nazi Germany, antisemitism, Lebensraum, abrogation of the Treaty of Versailles, and opposition to degenerate art. He is also known for his rejection of Christianity, while playing a role in the development of Positive Christianity. At Nuremberg he was tried, sentenced to death, and executed by hanging as a war criminal.
- Herman Schmalenbach (1885–1950), who refined the concepts of Gemeinschaft and Bund. While his ideas on the Bund were utilized in Nazi thought there is no evidence that Schalenbach was a Nazi or sympathized with their genocidal racial view regarding Jews. He spent World War 2 years in Switzerland.
- Carl Schmitt (1888–1985) was a jurist, philosopher, political theorist, and professor of law. Schmitt joined the Nazi Party on 1 May 1933. He presented his theories as an ideological foundation of the Nazi dictatorship, and a justification of the "Führer" state with regard to legal philosophy, in particular through the concept of auctoritas. Nevertheless, in December 1936, the SS publication Das schwarze Korps accused Schmitt of being an opportunist, a Hegelian state thinker and basically a Catholic, and called his anti-semitism a mere pretense, citing earlier statements in which he criticized the Nazis' racial theories. After this, Schmitt resigned from his position as "Reichsfachgruppenleiter" (Reich Professional Group Leader), although he retained his post as a professor in Berlin, and his post as "Preußischer Staatsrat". Although Schmitt continued to be investigated into 1937, further reprisals were stopped by Göring. In 1945, Schmitt was captured by the American forces and released in 1946. Schmitt refused every attempt at de-nazification, which effectively barred him from positions in academia.
- Otto Strasser (1897-1974), brother of Gregor Strasser (see below under Others), who advocated a version of Nazism based on economic antisemitism. He was ideologically similar to Ernst Röhm, and emphasized the need for the Nazis to radically overthrow German society. His few supporters were later purged from the NSDAP during the Night of the Long Knives, and he lived in exile for most of the Third Reich. Ironically for some, his views on the Soviet Union were friendly at certain points in his life. See Strasserism for more information.
- Hans Blüher (1888-1954), philosopher who advocated the concept of a Männerbund, was a supporter of the Nazis until the Night of the Long Knives.

== Scientists and physicians ==
- Karl Brandt (1904–1948), SS officer and physician, Hitler's personal doctor for a period, was the administrator of the Aktion T4 euthanasia program.
- Eugen Fischer, German biologist, member of the Nazi Party, prominent in genetics and "racial hygiene".
- Hans F. K. Günther (1891–1968), German race researcher and eugenicist in the Weimar Republic and Nazi Germany, also known as "Rassengünther" (Race Günther) or "Rassenpapst" (Race Pope). He is considered to be a major influence on Nazi racialist thought, and was a member of the Nazi Party.
- Philipp Lenard (1862–1947), Nobel laureate and ideologue of the Deutsche Physik movement.
- Fritz Lenz, German geneticist, member of the Nazi Party, and influential specialist in "racial hygiene".
- Josef Mengele (1911-1979), Nazi SS officer and physician at the Auschwitz death camp who performed inhumane experiments on the inmates there. Known as the "Angel of Death".
- Alfred Ploetz (1860–1940), German physician, biologist, and eugenicist who introduced the concept of racial hygiene in Germany. He was a member of the Nazi party. His brother Ernst Rüdin, also a committed Nazi, praised him in 1938 as a man who "by his meritorious services has helped to set up our Nazi ideology."
- Johannes Stark (1874–1957), Nobel laureate and ideologue of the Deutsche Physik movement.
- Otmar Freiherr von Verschuer (1896–1969), German human biologist and eugenicist primarily concerned with racial hygiene and twin research.
- Ernst Schäfer (1910-1992), Schäfer is famous for the 1938–1939 German expedition to Tibet, he was a member of the SS division that is discussed in this article known as the Ahnenerbe.

== Theologians and spiritual leaders ==
- Ernst Bergmann (1881–1945), German philosopher who in his work, Die 25 Thesen der Deutschreligion (Twenty-five Points of the German Religion), held that the Old Testament and portions of the New Testament of the Bible were inaccurate. He claimed that Jesus was not a Jew and of Aryan origin, and that Adolf Hitler was the new messiah.
- Jakob Wilhelm Hauer (1881–1962), German Indologist and religious studies writer. He was the founder of the German Faith Movement.
- Ludwig Müller (1883–1945), was a theologian and church leader who played a major role in the Nazi party's attempt to misdirect the Protestant, mainly Lutheran churches of Germany toward a basis in Aryan ideology and away from its Jewish origins. He had a leading part in the Nazi, Gleichschaltung, the plan to unite the previously independent Protestant churches into a single Church of the New Order, which is part of longer history of an attempt to unify the churches under the German Evangelical Church, see Reichskirche. Withholding baptism from non-Aryans was enforced in most churches during the Nazi period, though not without some protest.
- Wilhelm Stapel (1882-1954) was a German theologian, who edited the Antisemitic monthly magazine Deutsches Volksstum
- Ernst Graf zu Reventlow (1869-1943) brother of Fanny zu Reventlow, German naval officer, journalist, and Nazi politician, a loyal supporter of the German Faith Movement.
- Herman Wirth (1885-1981), a Dutch-German historian, who co-founded the Ahnenerbe, alongside Himmler.
- Wolfram Sievers (1905-1948) Director of the above mention Ahnenerbe.
- Rudolf von Sebottendorf (1875-1945) was the founder of the Thule Society, a post-WW1 society that had many ideological similarities with Nazism and was interested in the occult. He converted to Sufi Islam and served as an Abwehr agent in Istanbul from 1942 to 1945, but was considered useless at his job, and later committed suicide.
- Karl Maria Wiligut (1866-1946), an Austrian occultist who was very involved in Himmler's SS Race and Settlement Main Office.

== Others ==
- Richard Walther Darré (1895–1953), one of the leading Nazi blood and soil ideologists. He served as Reich Minister of Food and Agriculture from 1933 to 1942.
- Anton Drexler (1884–1942), German Nazi political leader of the 1920s. He joined the Fatherland Party during World War I. He was a poet and a member of the völkisch agitators who, together with journalist Karl Harrer, founded the German Workers' Party (DAP) in Munich with Gottfried Feder and Dietrich Eckart in 1919.
- Dietrich Eckart (1868–1923), who developed the ideology of a "genius higher human", based on writings by Lanz von Liebenfels. He was a member of the Nazi party.
- Gottfried Feder (1883–1941), economist and one of the early key members of the Nazi Party. He was their economic theoretician. It was his lecture in 1919 that drew Hitler into the party.
- Joseph Goebbels (1887–1945) Goebbels, the Nazi propaganda minister, was perhaps the most intellectual of the major figures in Nazi Germany. Originally part of the more radical wing of Nazism under Gregor and Otto Strasser, Goebbels broke with them after Hitler took pains to personally indoctrinate Goebbels and convert him to support the mainstream of the party, which Hitler controlled.
- Erik Jan Hanussen (1889-1933) The documentary Hitler and the Occult describes how Hitler “seemed endowed with even greater authority and charisma” after he had resumed public speaking in March 1927. The narrator states that “this may have been due to the influence” of the clairvoyant performer and publicist Erik Jan Hanussen. "Hanussen helped Hitler perfect a series of exaggerated poses,” useful for speaking before a huge audience. The documentary then interviews Dusty Sklar about the contact between Hitler and Hanussen, and the narrator makes the statement about “occult techniques of mind control and crowd domination." In 1929, Hanussen predicted, for example, that Wilhelm II would return to Germany in 1930 and that the problem of unemployment would be solved in 1931.
- Heinrich Himmler (1900-1945) Himmler was interested in mysticism and the occult from an early age. He tied this interest into his racist philosophy, looking for proof of Aryan and Nordic racial superiority from ancient times. He promoted a cult of ancestor worship, particularly among members of the SS, as a way to keep the race pure and provide immortality to the nation. Viewing the SS as an "order" along the lines of the Teutonic Knights, he had them take over the Church of the Teutonic Order in Vienna in 1939. He began the process of replacing Christianity with a new moral code that rejected humanitarianism and challenged the Christian concept of marriage. The Ahnenerbe, a research society founded by Himmler in 1935, searched the globe for proof of the superiority and ancient origins of the Germanic race.
- Ernst Rudolf Huber (1903–1990) was a German lawyer who provided legal rationalizations for the Nazi regime.
- Lanz von Liebenfels (1874–1954), monk and theologian who influenced Nazi ideology by inventing a blend of theology and biology called theozoology.
- Ernst Schertel (1884-1958) An article "Hitler's Forgotten Library" by Timothy Ryback, published in The Atlantic (May 2003), mentions a book from Hitler's private library authored by Ernst Schertel. Schertel, whose interests were flagellation, dance, occultism, nudism and BDSM, had also been active as an activist for sexual liberation before 1933. He had been imprisoned in Nazi Germany for seven months and his doctoral degree was revoked. He is supposed to have sent a dedicated copy of his 1923 book Magic: History, Theory and Practice to Hitler some time in the mid-1920s. Hitler is said to have marked extensive passages, including one which reads "He who does not have the demonic seed within himself will never give birth to a magical world".
- Gregor Strasser (1892–1934) Brother of Otto Strasser (above mentioned), who was involved in the Kapp Putsch, he formed his own völkischer Wehrverband ("popular defense union") which he merged into the NSDAP in 1921. Initially a loyal supporter of Adolf Hitler, he took part in the Beer Hall Putsch and held a number of high positions in the Nazi Party. Soon however, Strasser became a target for Hitler due to his connections with his brother Otto, sealing his fate during the Night of the Long Knives.
- Julius Streicher (1885–1946), the founder and publisher of Der Stürmer newspaper, which became a central element of the Nazi propaganda machine. His portrayal of Jews as subhuman and evil played a critical role in the dehumanization and marginalization of the Jewish minority in the eyes of common Germans – creating the necessary conditions for the later perpetration of the Holocaust. He was a member of the Nazi party.
- Otto Rahn (1903-1939), a Medievalist, Ariosophist, and SS officer, who was known for his hunt for the Holy Grail. He died under mysterious circumstances in 1939.

== Intellectuals indirectly associated with Nazism ==
Some writers came before the Nazi era and their writings were incorporated into Nazi ideology:

- Madame Blavatsky (1831–1891), founder of Theosophy and the Theosophical Society. Guido von List took up some of Blavatsky's racial theories, and mixed them with nationalism to create occultic Ariosophy, a precursor of Nazi ideology. Ariosophy emphasized intellectual expositions of racial evolution. The Thule Society was one of several German occult groups drawing on Ariosophy to preach Aryan supremacy. It provides a direct link between occult racial theories and the racial ideology of Hitler and the emerging Nazi party.
- Edward Bulwer-Lytton (1803–1873) was an English writer and politician who served as Secretary of State for the Colonies. Although politically liberal, he wrote the book Vril: The Power of the Coming Race, which influenced Blavatsky, and has been rumored to have been a precursor a secret Vril Society whose ideas were supposedly adopted by the SS.
- Emile Burnouf (1821–1907) was a racialist whose ideas influenced the development of theosophy and Aryanism.
- Thomas Carlyle (1795–1881), romantic Scottish writer, who propounded upon a Great Man Theory of History, which argued that history is largely determined by exceptional men. Goebels would read his biography of Frederick the Great to Hitler during WW2. Targets for his ire included the French, the Irish, Slavs, Turks, Americans, Catholics, and, most explicitly, blacks and Jews.
- Henry Ford (1863–1947) American industrialist, the founder of the Ford Motor Company, and sponsor of the development of the assembly line technique of mass production. His book "The International Jew" was praised by Hitler for its antisemitic rhetoric.
- Bernhard Förster (1843–1889), German antisemite teacher who wrote on the Jewish question, where he characterizes Jews as constituting a "parasite on the German body".
- Hans Freyer (1887–1969), German sociologist who called for an anti-liberal, anti-materialist, anti-Marxist Revolution von rechts (Revolution from the Right) that would emphasize organic bonds and community (Gemeinschaft) over the atomization of industrialized society (Gesellschaft).
- Martin Heidegger (1889–1976), German philosopher who was politically involved with National Socialism and rector of Freiburg University. Although after the war he neither apologized nor publicly expressed regret for his involvement with his affiliation with Nazism, in private he called it "the biggest stupidity of his life" (die größte Dummheit seines Lebens). For more information see Heidegger and Nazism to understand the nuances of his relationship.
- Stefan George (1868-1933) german symbolist poet who is famous for leading the George-Kreis and widely to regarded to have been part of the Conservative Revolution, wrote a poem entitled Das neue Reich.
- Arthur de Gobineau (1816–1882) was a French aristocrat, novelist and man of letters who developed the racialist theory of the Aryan master race in his book An Essay on the Inequality of the Human Races (1853–1855). Although the book condemns antisemitism and describes Jews in positive terms, the Nazis still referenced the work since it condemns race mixing and describes the Jews as "alien". De Gobineau is credited as being the father of modern racial demography.
- Madison Grant (1865–1937), American lawyer, known primarily for his work as a eugenicist and conservationist. As a eugenicist, Grant was responsible for one of the most widely read works of scientific racism, and played an active role in crafting strong immigration restriction and anti-miscegenation laws in the United States.
- Hanns Hörbiger (1860–1931) was an Austrian engineer who promoted the idea of a Welteislehre that was influential in the 1938-1939 German expedition to Tibet and was not directly involved in Nazism.
- Paul de Lagarde (1827–1891) was a German biblical scholar and orientalist. His Deutsche Schriften (1878–1881) became a nationalist text.
- Guido Karl Anton List (1848–1919), his concept of renouncing Christianity and returning to the paganism of the ancient Europeans found supporters within the Nazi party.
- Friedrich Nietzsche (1844–1900), although he was critical of Antisemitism and Nationalism, his concept of the Ubermensch was very easy to appropriate for the Nazis, and he was brother-in-law to Bernhard Forster. For more information see Nietzsche and fascism. He was also a major influence on Alfred Baeumler.
- Johann Plenge (1874–1963) was a German sociologist who wrote about the First World War as an antipode to the French Revolution (the ideas of 1914 vs. the ideas of 1789) and is considered to be influential to many Nazis.
- Oswald Spengler (1880–1936), German historian and philosopher. He is best known for his book The Decline of the West and the cyclical theory of the rise and decline of civilizations. He wrote extensively throughout World War I and the interwar period, and supported German hegemony in Europe. The Nazis held Spengler as an intellectual precursor but he was ostracized after 1933 for his pessimism about Germany and Europe's future, and his refusal to support Nazi ideas of racial superiority.
- Lothrop Stoddard (1883–1950), American political theorist, historian, eugenicist, and anti-immigration advocate who wrote a number of prominent books on scientific racism. He developed the concept of the untermensch.
- Adolf Stoecker (1835–1909), court chaplain to Kaiser Wilhelm and an antisemitic German theologian who founded one of the first antisemitic political parties in Germany, the Christian Social Party. He proposed severely limiting the civil rights of Jews in Germany. In September 1879 he delivered a speech entitled "What we demand of modern Jewry", in which he spelled out several demands of German Jews.
- Georges Vacher de Lapouge (1854–1936), French anthropologist, eugenicist, and anti-semite who developed the idea of a "Selectionist State" that would implement coercive measures to maintain the dominance and purity of dolichocephalic Aryans. His work strongly influenced Nazi eugenicists such as Hans F. K. Günther.
- Richard Wagner (1813–1883), famous German composer who was Hitler's favourite and a one-time friend of Nietzsche, before the two famously went their own ways, as well as father-in-law of Houston Stewart Chamberlain.
- Otto Weininger (1880–1903), although Jewish himself, his writings were considered both highly anti-semitic and misogynistic, for his magnum opus Sex and Character. Dietrich Eckart, once supposedly remarked to Adolf Hitler about him that "I only knew one decent Jew and he committed suicide the day when he realized that Jew lives upon the decay of peoples..."
