= The Occult Roots of Nazism =

1985 book by Nicholas Goodrick-Clarke

- Cover of the first edition
- Author: Nicholas Goodrick-Clarke
- Language: English
- Subject: Occultism in Nazism, Ariosophy
- Publisher: Aquarian Press
- Publication date: 1985
- Publication place: United Kingdom
- Media type: Print (hardcover)
- Pages: 294
- ISBN: 0-85030-402-4
- OCLC: 16645743
- Dewey Decimal: 133
- LC Class: DD256.5 .G596 1985
- Followed by: Hitler's Priestess

The Occult Roots of Nazism: The Ariosophists of Austria and Germany, 1890–1935, later published under the title The Occult Roots of Nazism: Secret Aryan Cults and Their Influence on Nazi Ideology, is a book about Ariosophy and Nazi occultism by historian Nicholas Goodrick-Clarke, who traces some of its roots back to esotericism in Germany and Austria between 1880 and 1945. The foreword is by Rohan Butler, who had written The Roots of National Socialism in the 1930s. The book is based on Goodrick-Clarke's 1982 Ph.D. thesis.

It was first published by The Aquarian Press in 1985, and republished in paperback form by New York University Press in 1992. The book was highly regarded upon its publication and has been called the seminal work on the topic of Nazism and occultism and as Goodrick-Clarke's most influential work. It received praise for being a serious scholarly effort on a subject which otherwise attracted many fringe or mythical claims.

== Background ==
The connections between Nazism and occultism had been subject to many explorations previously, but they tended to be sensationalistic with little basis in fact. Goodrick-Clarke wrote that he found the previous discussion of the connection to be "a literature rich in mystery and suggestion, but short on facts and hard evidence". Nevertheless, the question of how Nazism had come to have such an association with occultism in the first place interested him, and so he started researching contemporary fringe resources, only to find that "there was a hard kernel of truth" to the connection.

The book is based on Nicholas Goodrick-Clarke's 1982 Ph.D. thesis The Ariosophists of Austria and Germany, 1890–1935: Reactionary Political Fantasy in Relation to Social Anxiety, of which it is a revised version. The book is based on archival sources and historical material, especially a large array of fringe esoteric works of the time. Many of the works consulted by Goodrick-Clarke were extremely rare and difficult to consult. At the time of the book's publication he was a visiting scholar at Fitzwilliam College.

== Contents ==
This foreword was written by Rohan Butler. Goodrick-Clarke traces the connections between Nazism and esotericism in Germany and Austria between 1880 and 1945. He profiles the various leaders of the movement at hand, for which he coins the name Ariosophy. He rather attempts to keep strictly to his archival source material and limiting speculation, presenting the occult ties in a matter-of-fact manner as just one element among many.

He concludes that some Nazis were influenced by the ideas of Ariosophists Lanz von Liebenfels and Guido von List, which through personal connections and other ties had an ideological influence on volkisch groups that spawned Nazism. He does not indicate any further connection. Goodrick-Clarke does not directly attribute the Nazi Party to the occultist German nationalism he profiles. In the final chapter, an examination of "Ariosophy and Adolf Hitler, he disregards the idea that Hitler himself had any involvement in Thule meetings or other occultism. He does argue it is probable that Hitler had read at least one work by Liebenfels, the magazine Ostara.

The book has several appendixes, from A to. Appendixes A and B are the genealogies of those involved, while appendix C is an additional history of Ariosophy. Appendix D is a "New Templar Verse". In appendix E, the only place the phrase "Nazi Occultism" actually appears in the book, Goodrick-Clarke makes an effort to debunk much of the "modern mythology of Nazi occultism" and traces the origins of the more dubious ideas, debunking several of the books associated with this modern mythology.

== Publication history ==
It was first published in Wellingborough, England by the Aquarian Press in 1985 in a 293 page edition. Prior to its publication it was listed in The Bookseller under the title The Occult Roots of Nazism: Secret Racist Sects in Austria and Germany 1890–1935; in 1992, it was republished as a paperback with a different subtitle by New York University Press in New York, as The Occult Roots of Nazism: Secret Aryan Cults and Their Influence on Nazi Ideology, though there were no textual changes from the first edition. It was published again by that title in an expanded edition with a new preface in 2004 by Tauris Parke (ISBN 1-86064-973-4).

The book was a commercial success, which Goodrick-Clarke credited to his approach to the material and portrayal of Nazism as a "political religion". The book has been continually in print since its first publication in 1985, and has been translated into twelve languages. The French translation, Les Racines occultistes du Nazisme: Les Aryosophistes en Autriche et en Allemagne (1890-1935), was published by Éditions Pardès in 1989, and translated by Patrick Jauffrineau and Bernard Dubant. It was published in a German edition in 1997 as Die okkulten Wurzeln des Nationalsozialismus. The German edition features a preface and an additional 15-page essay Nationalsozialismus und Okkultismus (transl. National Socialism and Occultism) by H.T. Hakl, later published as its own short book form in 2000 as Unknown Sources: National Socialism and the Occult.

Goodrick-Clarke followed up the book with a biography of esoteric Hitlerist Savitri Devi in 1998 as Hitler's Priestess. He also wrote a successor to The Occult Roots of Nazism in 2002, Black Sun, which focused on esotericism in neo-Nazism. Black Sun was originally intended as a sequel, but in the course of its writing its scope expanded beyond the original work.

== Reception ==
The book was highly regarded upon its publication, receiving several positive reviews. It has been called the seminal work on the topic of Nazism and occultism, as well as the author's most influential work. Jeffrey Kaplan stated in 1998 that it "remains the definitive work on the subject". Eric Kurlander noted it as "arguably the best book in this genre: it illustrates the significance, as well as the limits, of the influence of Austro-German occultism on National Socialism." Peter Staudenmaier described it as the "definitive treatment" of Ariosophy, a "mainstay of the literature", and as a "comprehensive overview of the primary sources". In 2021, Christian Giudice described the book as Goodrick-Clarke's "magnum opus", and as a "ground-breaking work [that] endeavored to wipe away all of the fallacies that had accumulated on the topic in the previous twenty-five years". He wrote that decades later, the work still "stood the test of time, and it is still today considered as one of the most important works on the topic". In 2025, Dominic Alessio and Robert J. Wallis listed it as one of three "landmark" works on the subject of race and heathenry, alongside its successor Black Sun and Mattias Gardell's Gods of the Blood.

It received praise for being a serious scholarly effort on a subject which otherwise attracted many fringe or mythical claims. Staudenmaier said the book had "almost single-handedly wrested the topic of modern German occultism from the hands of occult aficionados and showed that a serious historical appraisal was both possible and productive". As scholar Anna Bramwell writes, "One should not be deceived by the title into thinking that it belongs to the 'modern mythology of Nazi occultism', a world of salacious fantasy convincingly dismembered by the author in an Appendix". Staudenmaier however criticized the book's title, which he said may have itself contributed to some misconceptions the book otherwise dispelled, and said the way it focused on Ariosophy served to obscure Ariosophy's peculiar position in the world of occultism. He described it as a "veritable microcosm of the potentials and pitfalls of historical engagement with the occult". A review in the Yorkshire Post said Goodrick-Clarke had researched with a "thoroughgoing meticulousness, clearly indicating" the connection between these occult ideas and Nazism, writing that it "reawakens in one's thinking the historic credo of the constant struggle between the children of light and the children of darkness".

Historians like Martyn Housden and Jeremy Noakes commend Goodrick-Clarke for addressing the relationship between Ariosophic ideologies rooted in certain Germanic cultures and the actual agency of Nazi hierarchy; the problem, Housden remarks, lies in the efficacy of these Ariosophic practices. Housden wrote that, "The true value of this study, therefore, lies in its painstaking elucidation of an intrinsically fascinating subculture which helped colour rather than cause aspects of Nazism. In this context, it also leaves us pondering a central issue: why on earth were Austrian and German occultists, just like the Nazi leadership, quite so susceptible to, indeed obsessed by, specifically aggressive racist beliefs anyway?" Noakes continues this general thought by concluding, "[Goodrick-Clarke] provides not only a definitive account of the influence of Ariosophy on Nazism, a subject which is prone to sensationalism, but also fascinating insights into the intellectual climate of the late nineteenth and early twentieth century." Anna Bramwell wrote that he succeeded in demystifying the Thule Society. Reviewing the French translation, Émile Poulat wrote it was a thorough and critical investigation. Ian Kershaw wrote that Goodrick-Clarke had created an "intriguing study of apocalyptic fantasies".
