= Occultism in Nazism =

Speculation about Nazism and occultism

The association of Nazism with occultism occurs in a wide range of theories, speculation, and research into the origins of Nazism and into Nazism's possible relationship with various occult traditions. Such ideas have flourished as a part of popular culture since at least the early 1940s (during World War II), and gained renewed popularity starting in the 1960s.

British historian Nicholas Goodrick-Clarke analyzed the topic in his 1985 book The Occult Roots of Nazism, in which he argued there were in fact links between some ideals of Ariosophy and Nazi ideology. He also analyzed the problems of the numerous popular occult historiography books written on the topic, which he found heavily exaggerated the relationship between Nazism and the occult. Goodrick-Clarke sought to separate empiricism and sociology from the modern mythology of Nazi occultism that exists in many books which "have represented the Nazi phenomenon as the product of arcane and demonic influence". He evaluated most of the 1960 to 1975 books on Nazi occultism as "sensational and under-researched".

== Ariosophy ==
Historian Nicholas Goodrick-Clarke's 1985 book, The Occult Roots of Nazism, discusses the possibility of links between the ideas of the occult and those of Nazism. The book's main subject is the racist-occult movement of Ariosophy, a major strand of nationalist esotericism in Germany and Austria during the 19th and early 20th centuries. He introduces his work as "an underground history, concerned with the myths, symbols, and fantasies that bear on the development of reactionary, authoritarian, and Nazi styles of thinking", arguing that "fantasies can achieve a causal status once they have been institutionalized in beliefs, values, and social groups".

In Goodrick-Clarke's view, the Ariosophist movement built on the earlier ideas of the Völkisch movement, a traditionalist, pan-German response to industrialization and urbanization, but it associated the problems of modernism specifically with the supposed misdeeds of Freemasonry, Kabbalah, and Rosicrucianism in order to "prove the modern world was based on false and evil principles". The Ariosophist "ideas and symbols filtered through to several anti-semitic and Nationalist groups in late Wilhelmian Germany, from which the early Nazi-Party emerged in Munich after the First World War". He demonstrated links between two Ariosophists and Heinrich Himmler.

== Contemporary claims ==
In the essay that is included in the German edition of The Occult Roots of Nazism, also published in a short book, Unknown Sources: National Socialism and the Occult, translated by Goodrick-Clarke, Hans Thomas Hakl, an Austrian writer, traces the origins of the speculation about Nazism and Occultism back to several works from the early 1940s. Already in 1933 a pseudonymous Kurt van Emsen described Hitler as a "demonic personality", but his work was soon forgotten.

The first allusions that Hitler was directed by occult forces which were taken up by the later authors came from French Christian esotericist René Kopp. In two articles published in the monthly esoteric journal Le Chariot from June 1934 and April 1939, he seeks to trace the source of Hitler's power to supernatural forces. The second article was titled: "L'Enigme du Hitler" In other French esoteric journals of the 1930s, Hakl could not find similar hints. In 1939 another French author, Edouard Saby, published a book: Hitler et les Forces Occultes. Saby already mentions Hanussen and Ignaz Trebitsch-Lincoln. Hakl suggests that Edouard Saby would have the copyright on the myth of Nazi occultism.

However, another significant book from 1939 is better-known: Hermann Rauschning's Hitler speaks. There it is said (in the chapter "Black and white Magic") that "Hitler surrendered himself to forces that carried him away. … He turned himself over to a spell, which can, with good reason and not simply in a figurative analogy, be described as demonic magic". The chapter "Hitler in private" is even more dramatic, and was left out in the German edition from 1940.

One of the earliest claims of Nazi occultism can be found in Lewis Spence's book Occult Causes of the present War (1940). According to Spence, Alfred Rosenberg and his book The Myth of the Twentieth Century were responsible for promoting pagan, occult, and anti-Christian ideas that motivated the Nazi party.

== Modern mythology ==
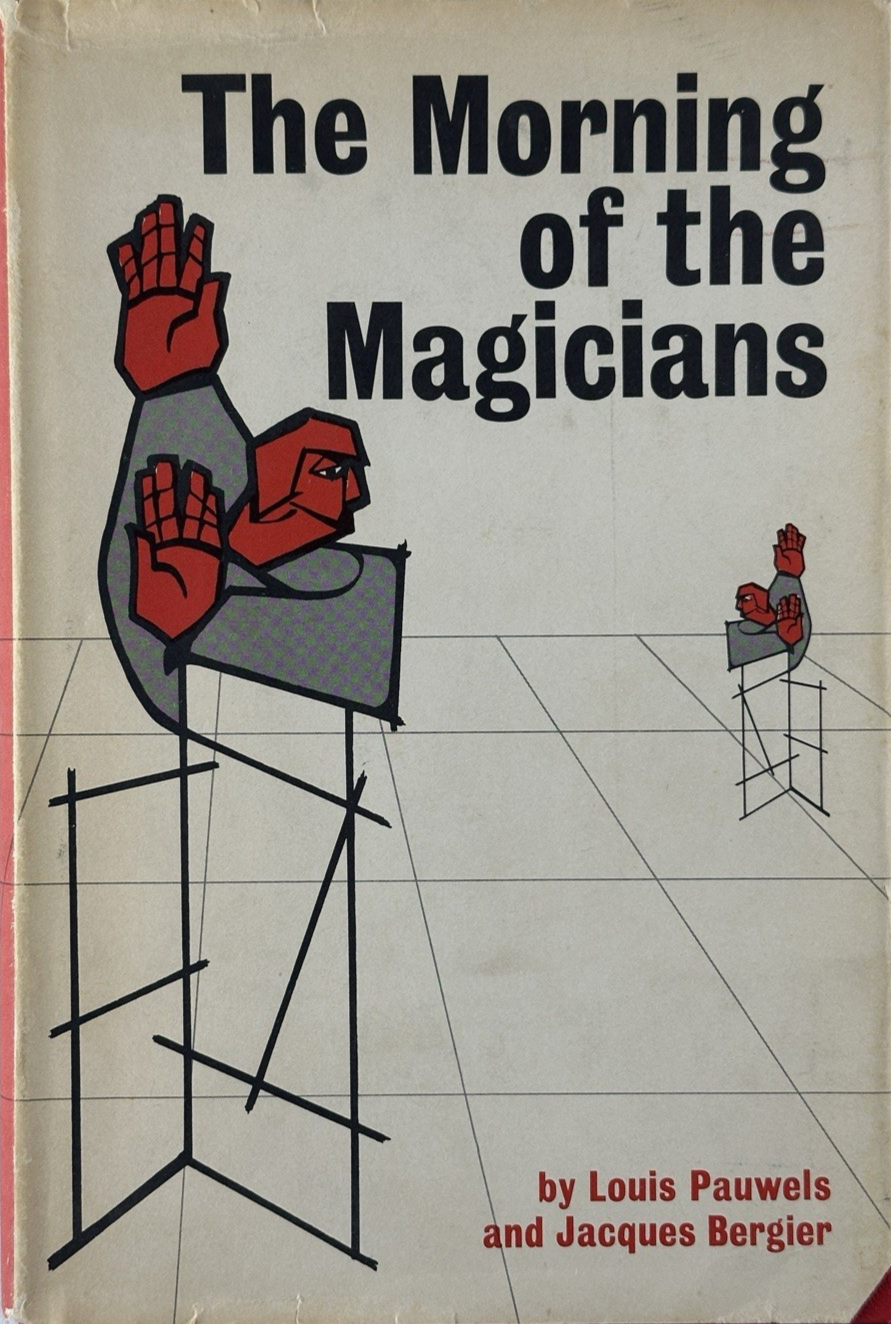
Cover of the 1964 American edition of The Morning of the Magicians, a book widely cited as having encouraged the popular, and inaccurate, modern mythology on the subject

By the early 1960s, "one could now clearly detect a mystique of Nazism." A sensationalistic and fanciful presentation of its figures and symbols, "shorn of all political and historical context", gained ground with thrillers, non-fiction books, and films and permeated "the milieu of popular culture." At the time, it was seen as a sensational topic that attracted strong sales.

Goodrick-Clarke gives a highly critical view of much of the popular literature on the topic. In his words, these books describe Hitler and the Nazis as being controlled by a "hidden power […] characterized either as a discarnate entity (e.g., 'black forces', 'invisible hierarchies', 'unknown superiors') or as a magical elite in a remote age or distant location". He has referred to this genre as the "Nazi Mysteries", and terms this genre "crypto-history", as its defining element and "final point of explanatory reference is an agent which has remained concealed to previous historians of National Socialism".

Goodrick-Clarke notes numerous pseudo-historic "books written about Nazi occultism between 1960 and 1975", that "were typically sensational and under-researched", noting that,

Complete ignorance of the primary sources was common to most authors and inaccuracies and wild claims were repeated by each newcomer to the genre until abundant literature existed, based on wholly spurious 'facts' concerning the powerful Thule Society, the Nazi links with the East, and Hitler's occult initiation.

Multiple scholars attribute the origin of the modern Nazi Mysteries genre and interest in the Nazi occult to the 1960 book The Morning of the Magicians. The Morning of the Magicians is a generally conspiratorial book, covering such topics as conspiracy theories and theories similar to later ancient astronaut conspiracies; however, the entire second half of the work is dedicated to Nazi-Occult connections, in a section entitled "A Few Years in the Absolute Elsewhere". Stéphane Françoise wrote in 2023 that:

The origin of the appetite for contemporary 'Nazi occultism' was the success of Matin des magiciens. Not only did it enable this theme to be spread to a larger audience but it also at the same time triggered two cumulative effects: the first was the number of people now made aware of this 'Nazi occultism' theme and the second, stemming from the first, was the enthusiasm, the exceptional hankering readers had for this type of reading.

In his 2002 work Black Sun, which was originally intended to trace the survival of occult Nazi themes in the postwar period, Goodrick-Clarke considered it necessary to readdress the topic. He devotes one chapter of the book to "the Nazi mysteries", as he terms the field of Nazi occultism there. Other reliable summaries of the development of the genre have been written by German historians. The German edition of The Occult Roots of Nazism includes an essay, "Nationalsozialismus und Okkultismus" (transl. National Socialism and Occultism), which traces the origins of the speculation about Nazi occultism back to publications from the late 1930s, and which was subsequently translated by Goodrick-Clarke into English. The German historian Michael Rißmann has also included a longer "excursus" about "Nationalsozialismus und Okkultismus" in his acclaimed book on Adolf Hitler's religious beliefs.

According to Goodrick-Clarke, the speculation of Nazi occultism originated from "post-war fascination with Nazism". The "horrid fascination" of Nazism upon the Western mind emerges from the "uncanny interlude in modern history" that it presents to an observer a few decades later. The idolization of Hitler in Nazi Germany, its short-lived dominion on the European continent and Nazism's extreme antisemitism set it apart from other periods of modern history. "Outside a purely secular frame of reference, Nazism was felt to be the embodiment of evil in a modern twentieth-century regime, a monstrous pagan relapse in the Christian community of Europe."

Books considered to be part of this literary trend include:

- Louis Pauwels and Jacques Bergier, 1960, The Morning of the Magicians
- Dietrich Bronder, 1964, Bevor Hitler kam
- Jean-Michel Angebert, 1971, Les mystiques du soleil
- Jean-Michel Angebert, 1971, Hitler et la tradition cathare
- René Alleau, Hitler et les sociétés secrètes
- Trevor Ravenscroft, 1972, The Spear of Destiny
- Robert Ambelain, Les Arcanes noires de l'hitlérisme
- J. H. Brennan, 1974, The Occult Reich.
- Miguel Serrano, Adolf Hitler: El último avatara

== Claims ==
=== Demonic possession of Hitler ===
For a demonic influence on Hitler, Hermann Rauschning's Conversations with Hitler is brought forward as a source. However, most modern scholars do not consider Rauschning reliable. (As Nicholas Goodrick-Clarke summarises, "recent scholarship has almost certainly proved that Rauschning's conversations were mostly invented".) The best that can be said for Rauschning's claims may be Goodrick-Clarke's judgment that they "record ... the authentic voice of Hitler by inspired guesswork and imagination."

Similarly to Rauschning, August Kubizek, one of Hitler's closest friends since childhood, claims that Hitler—17 years old at the time—once spoke to him of "returning Germany to its former glory"; of this comment August said, "It was as if another being spoke out of his body, and moved him as much as it did me."

The article "Hitler's Forgotten Library" by Timothy Ryback, published in The Atlantic (May 2003), mentions a book from Hitler's private library authored by Ernst Schertel. Schertel, whose interests included flagellation, dance, occultism, nudism and BDSM, had been an activist for sexual liberation before 1933. He had been imprisoned in Nazi Germany for seven months and his doctoral degree was revoked. He is supposed to have sent a dedicated copy of his 1923 book Magic: History, Theory, Practice to Hitler some time in the mid-1920s. Hitler is said to have marked extensive passages, including one which reads "He who does not have the demonic seed within himself will never give birth to a magical world".

According to James Herbert Brennan in his book The Occult Reich, Hitler's mentor, Dietrich Eckart (to whom Hitler dedicates Mein Kampf), wrote to a friend of his in 1923: "Follow Hitler! He will dance, but it is I who have called the tune. We have given him the 'means of communication' with Them. Do not mourn for me; I shall have influenced history more than any other German."

The Vatican's chief exorcist, Father Gabriele Amorth, held the belief that Hitler and other Nazi leaders were influenced by demons.

=== New World Order ===
Conspiracy theorists "frequently identify German National Socialism among other things as a precursor of the New World Order". With regard to Hitler's later ambition of imposing the Nazi regime throughout Europe, Nazi propaganda used the term Neuordnung (often poorly-translated as "the New Order", while actually referring to the "re-structuration" of state borders on the European map and the resulting post-war economic hegemony of Greater Germany), so one could probably say that the Nazis pursued a new world order in terms of politics. However, the claim that Hitler and the Thule Society conspired to create a New World Order is unfounded.

=== Aleister Crowley ===
There are also unverifiable rumors that the occultist Aleister Crowley sought to contact Hitler during World War II. Despite several allegations and speculations to the contrary, there is no evidence of such an encounter. In 1991, John Symonds, one of Crowley's literary executors, published a book: The Medusa's Head or Conversations between Aleister Crowley and Adolf Hitler, which has definitively been shown to be literary fiction. That the edition of this book was limited to 350 also contributed to the mystery surrounding the topic. Mention of a contact between Crowley and Hitler - without any sources or evidence - is also made in a letter from René Guénon to Julius Evola dated October 29, 1949, which later reached a broader audience.

=== Erik Jan Hanussen ===
Whether Hitler had met Hanussen at all is not certain. That he even encountered him before March 1927 is not confirmed by other sources about Hanussen. In the late 1920s to early 1930s Hanussen made political predictions in his own newspaper, Hanussens Bunte Wochenschau, that gradually started to favour Hitler, but until late 1932 these predictions varied. In 1929, Hanussen predicted, for example, that Wilhelm II would return to Germany in 1930 and that the problem of unemployment would be solved in 1931.

=== Nazi mysticism, occultism, and science-fiction ===
Nazi mysticism in German culture is further expanded in an article by Manfred Nagl, "SF (Science-Fiction), Occult Sciences, and Nazi Myths", published in the journal Science Fiction Studies. In it, Nagl writes that the racial narratives described in contemporary German Science Fiction stories, like The Last Queen of Atlantis, by Edmund Kiss, provide further notions of racial superiority under the auspices of Ariosophy, Aryanism, and alleged historic racial Mysticism, suggesting that writings associated with possible Occultism, Ariosophy, or Aryanism were products intended to influence and justify in a socio-political manner, rather than simply establish cultural heritage. The stories themselves dealt with "...heroes, charismatic leader types, (who) have been chosen by fate - with the resources of a sophisticated and extremely powerful technology".

Nagl considers science fiction pieces like Atlantis further fueled the violent persuasiveness of Nazi leaders, such as Adolf Hitler and Heinrich Himmler, as further justification for a "Nazi elite (envisioning) for itself in occupied East European territories". This, in turn, allegedly propagated public support of Nazi ideology, summated by Nagl as "a tremendous turning back of culture, away from the age of reason and consciousness, toward the age of a 'sleepwalking certainty', the age of supra-rational magic".

== Documentaries ==
More than 60 years after the end of the Third Reich, Nazism and Adolf Hitler have become a recurring subject in history documentaries. From the perspective of academic history, these documentaries on Nazism, if ever commented, are seen as problematic because they do not contribute to an actual understanding of the problems that arise in the study of Nazism and Neo-Nazism. Without referring to a specific documentary Mattias Gardell, a historian who studies contemporary separatist groups, writes:

In documentaries portraying the Third Reich, Hitler is cast as a master magician; these documentaries typically include scenes in which Hitler is speaking at huge mass meetings. [...] Cuts mix Hitler screaming with regiments marching under the sign of the swastika. Instead of providing a translation of his verbal crescendos, the sequence is overlaid with a speaker talking about something different. All this combines to demonize Hitler as an evil wizard spellbinding an unwitting German people to become his zombified servants until they are liberated from the spell by the Allied victory after which, suddenly, there were no German Nazis left among the populace. How convenient it would be if this image were correct. National socialism could be defeated with garlic. Watchdog groups could be replaced with a few vampire killers, and resources being directed into anti-racist community programs could be directed at something else. [...]

The truth, however, is that millions of ordinary German workers, farmers and businessmen supported the national socialist program. [...] They were people who probably considered themselves good citizens, which is far more frightening than had they merely been demons.

=== Ernst Schäfer's expedition to Tibet ===
At least one documentary, Hitler's Search for the Holy Grail, includes footage from the 1938-1939 German expedition to Tibet. The documentary describes it as "the most ambitious expedition" of the SS. This original video material was made accessible again by Marco Dolcetta in his series Il Nazismo Esoterico in 1994. An interview that Dolcetta conducted with Schäfer does not support the theories of Nazi occultism, neither does Reinhard Greve's 1995 article "Tibetforschung im SS Ahnenerbe" (transl. "Tibet Research Within the SS Ahnenerbe"), although the latter does mention the occult thesis. Hakl comments that Greve should have emphasized more strongly the unreliability of authors like Bergier and Pauwels or Angbert. Ernst Schäfer's expedition report explicitly remarks on the "worthless goings-on" by "a whole army of quacksalvers" concerning Asia and especially Tibet.

=== List of documentaries ===
==== German ====
- Hans-Jürgen Syberberg's Hitler - Ein Film aus Deutschland [transl. Hitler - A movie from Germany] (1977). Originally presented on German television, this is a seven-hour work in four parts: The Grail; A German Dream; The End of Winter's Tale; We, Children of Hell. The director uses documentary clips, photographic backgrounds, puppets, theatrical stages, and other elements from almost all the visual arts, with the actors addressing directly the audience/camera, in order to approach and expand on this most taboo subject of European history of the 20th century.
- Schwarze Sonne (1998) documentary by Rüdiger Sünner. Sünner also produced a book to accompany this documentary.

==== English ====
- The Occult History of the Third Reich (1991), narrated by Patrick Allen, directed by Dave Flitton. In four parts: Adolf Hitler; The SS: Blood and Soil; The Enigma of the Swastika; Himmler the Mystic.
- Unsolved Mysteries of World War II (1992): Occult & Secrets, also known as Volume 3 in the series. Episodes include: Hitler's Secret Weapons; The Riddle of Rudolph Hess; Himmler's Castle: Wewelsburg; The Last Days of Hitler; Decision At Dunkirk; Stalin's Secret Armies. Different releases contain different episodes.
- Nazis: The Occult Conspiracy (1998), directed by Tracy Atkinson and Joan Baran, narrated by Malcolm McDowell.
- In 1999, Channel 4 aired a Michael Wood documentary entitled Hitler's Search for the Holy Grail, as part of its "Secret History" series.
- Decoding the Past episode: "The Nazi Prophecies" (2005) by the History Channel.

== See also ==
- Adolf Hitler in popular culture
- Ahnenerbe
- German Christians movement
- German Evangelical Church
- Julleuchter
- Nazi archaeology
- Nazi UFOs
- Positive Christianity
- Religion in Nazi Germany
- Religious aspects of Nazism
- Religious views of Adolf Hitler
- Satanism and Nazism
- Walter Johannes Stein
