= Gods of the Blood =

2003 book by Mattias Gardell

- Cover of the first edition
- Author: Mattias Gardell
- Language: English
- Subject: Racist religiosity
- Publisher: Duke University Press
- Publication date: June 2003
- Publication place: United States
- Media type: Print (paperback and hardcover)
- Pages: 446
- ISBN: 0-8223-3059-8
- OCLC: 51053972
- Dewey Decimal: 322.420973
- LC Class: BL65.W48 G37 2003

Gods of the Blood: The Pagan Revival and White Separatism is a book by Swedish scholar Mattias Gardell discussing neopaganism (in particular Germanic) and its relationship to white separatism, as well as the broader white supremacist right. It was published by Duke University Press in June 2003. Gardell was then an associate professor on history of religion at Stockholm University. The book was based on several years of field work he had conducted among such movements that he undertook during the 1990s, and several interviews with members of those movements. The book received largely positive reviews.

== Background and publication history ==
The book's author was Swedish historian of religion Mattias Gardell, then an associate professor on history of religion at Stockholm University. He had authored previous books on the subject of race and religiosity, including In the Name of Elijah Muhammad about the Nation of Islam in 1996.

In writing the book, Gardell interviewed several members of white supremacist pagan movements. The book is largely based on five years of fieldwork among such movements that he undertook during the 1990s. Gods of the Blood was first published by Duke University Press in June 2003. Its first edition was 446 pages long.

== Contents ==
In an introduction, Gardell discusses the right-wing embrace of neopaganism in the context of increased globalization involving Europe and North America. He argues that the increasing multiculturalism of the United States has resulted in an increased amount of white supremacists seeking out neopaganism, as they see it as providing more "racial purity". Most of the book's content focuses on the American racist movement, but to some degree Europe is also covered.

Early chapters focus on related elements like the Ku Klux Klan and National Socialism, not solely racial neopaganism. Gardell gives a background on several of the broad types of, identifying eleven "dishes" of racist counteculture that are freely combined by members of the white racist subculture: "Klandom, national socialism, white-power music/skinhead culture, warrior ideals, conspiracy theories, anti-Semitism, populism, separatism, Christian Identity, race as religion, and finally Asatrú/Odinism". He defines the white racist movement as primarily a counterculture.

Most of the book focuses on Odinist and Asatru religiosity. Specific varieties like Wotansvolk and ethnic and darkside Asatru are discussed. In a final chapter, Gardell then returns to the globalization and its impact on these movements. He contends that the transformation of the racism into a religious element comes when they believe the "white race" to be divine and have an ancestral ancient element. Hence they view themselves as reviving the past. Gardell argues that such people as profiled in the book are not merely dreamers but that "romantic men armed with guns and religious determination have throughout history been a dangerous species".

The first edition included 26 black and white photos. It also has several pages of endnotes and an index.

== Reception ==
Publishers Weekly wrote that "although Gardell's academic tone and sometimes torturous prose make for slow reading, his well-researched book offers never-before-seen glimpses of the visions and goals of racist pagans". Scott Beekman praised the book, saying it would "stand as the benchmark monograph on this growing movement for the foreseeable future." In 2025, Dominic Alessio and Robert J. Wallis listed it as one of three "landmark" works on the subject of race and heathenry, alongside Nicholas Goodrick-Clarke's two works on the subject, The Occult Roots of Nazism and Black Sun. In 2026, writer Spencer Sunshine identified it as one of the first academic works to substantially examine neo-Nazi Satanism.

Amos Yong grouped the book with recent scholarship by Michael Barkun and Jeffrey Kaplan, while Beekman compared it in scope to Nicholas Goodrick-Clarke's book Black Sun. Beekman noted it as having an increased focus on the impacts of globalization compared to that book. With its more narrow focus on the pagan white separatist landscape, Yong described it as "a well-written report and analysis of this phenomenon". Stefanie von Schnurbein wrote that the combination of racialist ideology and neopaganism had been "sadly understudied" by scholars, and that "Gods of the Blood is an important and innovative contribution to filling this void".

Daniel Levitas called it useful, but very slow reading, and criticized some of Gardell's conclusions and statements, like calling antisemitism a marginal phenomenon. Beekman also said that most of the material in the book not about paganism (amounting to about 1/3rd of its length) felt like padding in comparison. Nathan R. Lynn for the Journal of Church and State praised the book, especially in its interviews with many significant white supremacist figures and the research personally conducted by Gardell.
