= The Occult Reich =

1974 book by J.H. Brennan

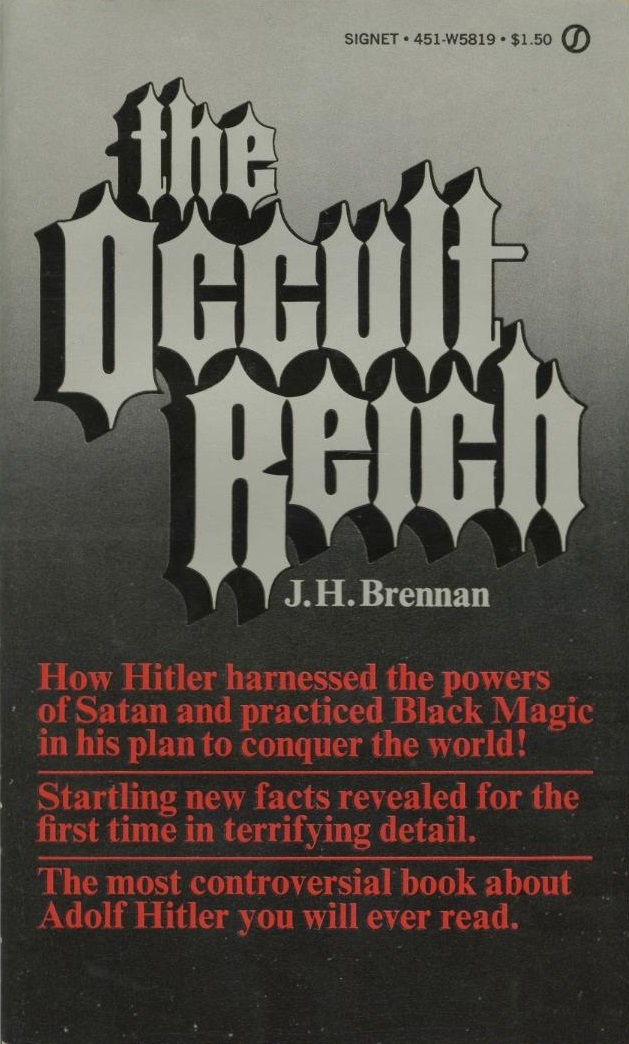
- Cover of the first American edition
- Author: James Herbert Brennan
- Language: English
- Subject: Nazi occultism
- Published: Futura Publications (United Kingdom); Signet Books (United States)
- Publication date: 1974
- Media type: Print
- Pages: 184
- ISBN: 0-86007-012-3
- OCLC: 2078100

The Occult Reich is a book about occultism in Nazism by J.H. Brennan. It was published in the United Kingdom in 1974 by Futura Publications, and published in New York by Signet Books the same year. Brennan advocates there being a meaningful connection between Nazism and occultism, and argues that Adolf Hitler was a Satanist and occultist and Nazism was a satanic enterprise.

== Background and publication history ==
It was authored by Irish writer J. H. Brennan. It was picked up by publishers simultaneously in the United Kingdom and the United States. The book was published in 1974 in both countries, published by Futura Publications in London in 1974, and in New York with New American Library/Signet, in mass market paperback format. This edition had 188 pages. It was reprinted in 1976. It was translated into Spanish and Japanese.

== Contents ==
Brennan, a believer in the truth of there being a meaningful connection between Nazism and occultism, argues that Adolf Hitler was a Satanist and occultist. As evidence for this, he brings up the fact that he had reversed the swastika, which Brennan calls "an indication, for those who had eyes to see, of the satanic nature of the Occult Reich". He argues Hitler's appeal to the German people is connected to Franz Mesmer's theory of animal magnetism. Brennan argues that much of Nazi policy was based on Tibetan mystical teachings.

Towards the end of the war, Brennan argues, Hitler tried to make a deal with the devil which he fulfilled through military casualties and the mass murder of millions of Jews as a blood sacrifice, before killing himself on a witch feast. It lacks notes, an index, or a bibliography.

== Reception ==
The book sold well, and was the most financially successful of any of Brennan's books of the time; he made about £4,000. Nick Freeman wrote it was "still more outlandish" than another outlandish book on the same topic, The Spear of Destiny, but wrote that the book "captured the popular imagination". A review from The Montreal Star noted it as "composed of some irrefutable facts and some imagination-stretching speculation", while Clarence Petersen for the Chicago Tribune said it relied on circumstantial evidence and that "true believers will swallow it whole". Multiple reviewers said that it was, at least, interesting, if far-fetched.

Nicholas Goodrick-Clarke, the author of a scholarly book that aimed to explore the true extent of Nazi occultism, described The Occult Reich as one of several books on this topic to reiterate what he described as "bizarre accounts of Nazi satanism, using the stock properties of the Vril Society, the much abused Haushofer, and the Thule Society". Writer Stephen E. Flowers was critical. He called it mostly a "rehash" of The Morning of the Magicians, and said it was "designed to capitalize on the occult Nazi craze of the early 1970s", preceding through "the usual list of suspects" in the context of Nazi occultism. Robert H. West said that, as with most other works from believers, "Brennan holds that magical power is in proportion to the magician's intensity of conviction and passion of purpose", and that he did "not quite insist on devils as personal beings".
