= Maria de Naglowska =

Russian occultist

Maria de Naglowska (15 August 1883 — 17 April 1936) was a Russian occultist, mystic, author, journalist, and poet who wrote and taught about sexual magical ritual practices while also being linked with the Parisian surrealist movement. She established and led an occult society known as the Confrerie de la Flèche d'Or (Brotherhood of the Golden Arrow) in Paris from 1932 to 1935. Naglowska's occult teaching centered on what she called the Third Term of the Trinity, in which the Holy Spirit of the classic Christian trinity is recognized as the divine feminine. Her practices aimed to bring about a reconciliation of the light and dark forces in nature through the union of the masculine and feminine, revealing the spiritually transformative power of sex.

== Biography ==
Naglowska was born in 1883 in St. Petersburg, Russia, the daughter of a provincial governor of Kazan. She was orphaned at age 12 and educated in the exclusive private and aristocratic Institute Smolna. Following a rift with her aristocratic family caused by her falling in love with a Jewish commoner, Moise Hopenko, she moved with him first to Berlin and then to Geneva where they were married and subsequently had three children. Around 1910, Hopenko abandoned her to move to Palestine. Naglowska earned a living as a school teacher. She also worked as a journalist but her radical writings led to her imprisonment and eventual expulsion from Switzerland after which she moved to Rome around 1920.

While in Rome she again worked as a journalist and became acquainted with Julius Evola.

In 1929, she moved to Paris. In order to support herself, she conducted occult seminars drawing upward of 40 people to hear her ideas on sex magic. Attendance at these sessions included notable avant-garde writers and artists such as Evola, William Seabrook, Man Ray, and André Breton. These gatherings eventually led to the establishment of the Brotherhood of the Golden Arrow in 1932.

Her events apparently were quite controversial. In 1935, Naglowska presented a speech at the Club de Faubourg in which she was billed as the "High Priestess of Love of the Temple of the Third Era" and speaking on the topic of "Magic and Sexuality: What is Magic Coitus? What is the Symbolic Serpent?" The club was tried and convicted for "outrage to public decency" but later successfully appealed the conviction.

During her time in Paris, Naglowska published La Flèche (The Arrow), a newspaper that ran for twenty issues, with pieces contributed by numerous occultists.

In 1931, she compiled, translated to French, and published the writings of American occultist Paschal Beverly Randolph on the subject of sexual magic and magic mirrors. Her translation and publication salvaged Randolph's work from obscurity and influenced European magic with his ideas and teachings. Naglowska augmented the text with what she claimed were Randolph's oral teachings.

She published the semi-autobiographical novella Le Rite Sacré de l'amour magique (The Sacred Ritual of Magical Love) in 1932. Later that year, she also published La Lumière du sexe (The Light of Sex), a mystic treatise and guide to sexual ritual that was required reading for those seeking to be initiated into the Brotherhood of the Golden Arrow.

Her later book on advanced sexual magic practices, Le mystère de la pendaison (The Hanging Mystery) details her advanced teachings on the Third Term of the Trinity and the spiritually transformative power of sex, and the practice of erotic ritual hanging and other sensory deprivation practices.

Beyond occult subjects, Naglowska also influenced the surrealist art movement. The "Lexique succinct de l'érotisme" in the catalog of the 1959 International Surrealist Exhibition in Paris noted her important influence. Surrealist Sarane Alexandrian wrote a detailed account of her life.

Naglowska had a 1935 dream foretelling her death and shortly thereafter went to live with her daughter in Zurich. She died there, age fifty-two, on April 17, 1936.

== Satanic symbolism ==
In his book Eros and the Mysteries of Love: The Metaphysics of Sex, Julius Evola claimed that Naglowska often wrote for shock effect noting her "deliberate intention to scandalize the reader through unnecessarily dwelling on Satanism."

Referring to herself as "a Satanic woman", she was surrounded with Satanic rhetoric and imagery, to provocative effect. She explicitly encouraged her disciples to imagine Satan as a force within humanity rather than as an actual external evil, destructive spirit. She proclaimed "Reason is in the service of Satan." She employs Satan as a symbol for man's desire for joy and freedom when she writes, "My Brothers, the Venerable Warriors of the Golden Arrow, will say: 'The Free Man in you was Satan, and He wanted eternal joy, but you, Freed Brother, you decided otherwise, because you were not only Satan but also He who lives, being Life."

== Ritual practice ==
One ritual for which there exists a first-hand account recalls that the ceremony included a naked Naglowska lying supine upon the altar while a male initiate places a chalice upon her genitalia and proclaims, "I will strive by any means to illuminate myself, with the aid of a woman who knows how to love me with virgin love...I will research with companions the initiatory erotic act, which, by transforming the heat into light arouses Lucifer from the satanic shades of masculinity."

== English translations ==
- The Light of Sex: Initiation, Magic, and Sacrament by Maria de Naglowska, translated by Donald Traxler, foreword by Hans Thomas Hakl (Inner Traditions, 2011, ISBN 978-1594774157)
- Advanced Sex Magic: The Hanging Mystery Initiation by Maria de Naglowska, translated by Donald Traxler (Inner Traditions, 2011, ISBN 978-1594774164)
- The Sacred Rite of Magical Love: A Ceremony of Word and Flesh by Maria de Naglowska, translated by Donald Traxler (Inner Traditions, 2012, ISBN 978-1594774171)
- Magia Sexualis: Sexual Practices for Magical Power by Paschal Beverly Randolph, Maria de Naglowska, translated by Donald Traxler (Inner Traditions, 2012, ISBN 978-1594774188)
- Initiatic Eroticism and Other Occult Writings from La Flèche by Maria de Naglowska, translated by Donald Traxler (Inner Traditions, 2013, ISBN 9781594774799)
