= Karlfried Graf Dürckheim =

German psychologist and philosopher (1896–1988)

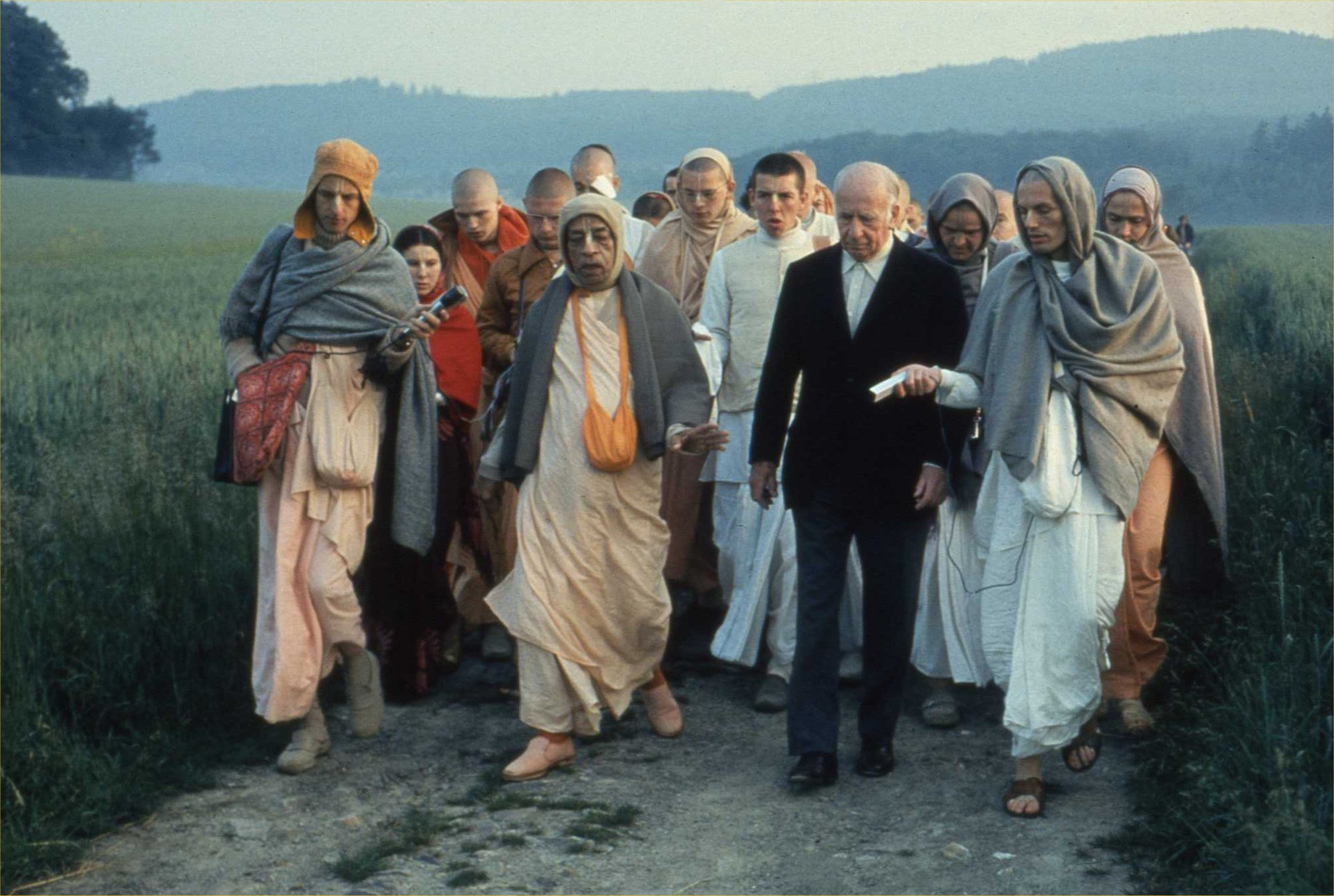
- Prabhupada on a morning walk with Baron von Dürckheim in Frankfurt, 1974
- Born: 24 October 1896; Munich, German Empire
- Died: 28 December 1988 (aged 92); Todtmoos, West Germany
- Education: University of Kiel, Ph.D. in Psychology
- Occupations: Diplomat, psychotherapist
- Known for: "Initiation Therapy"
- Political party: NSDAP, 1933–1945
- Spouse(s): Enja von Hattingberg (1888–1939); Maria Hippius (1909–2003)
- Awards: Honour Cross of the World War 1914/1918; War Merit Cross 1st Class with swords; Order of Merit of the Federal Republic of Germany
- Website: The Dürckheim Center

Karl Friedrich Alfred Heinrich Ferdinand Maria Graf Eckbrecht von Dürckheim-Montmartin (24 October 1896 – 28 December 1988) was a German diplomat, psychotherapist and spiritual teacher. A veteran of World War I, he was introduced to Zen early in life. After obtaining a doctorate in psychology, he became a supporter of the Nazi Party. Following World War II he was imprisoned in Japan which transformed him spiritually. Upon returning to Germany he became a leading proponent of Western esotericism, synthesizing teachings from Christian mysticism, depth psychology.

== Early life ==
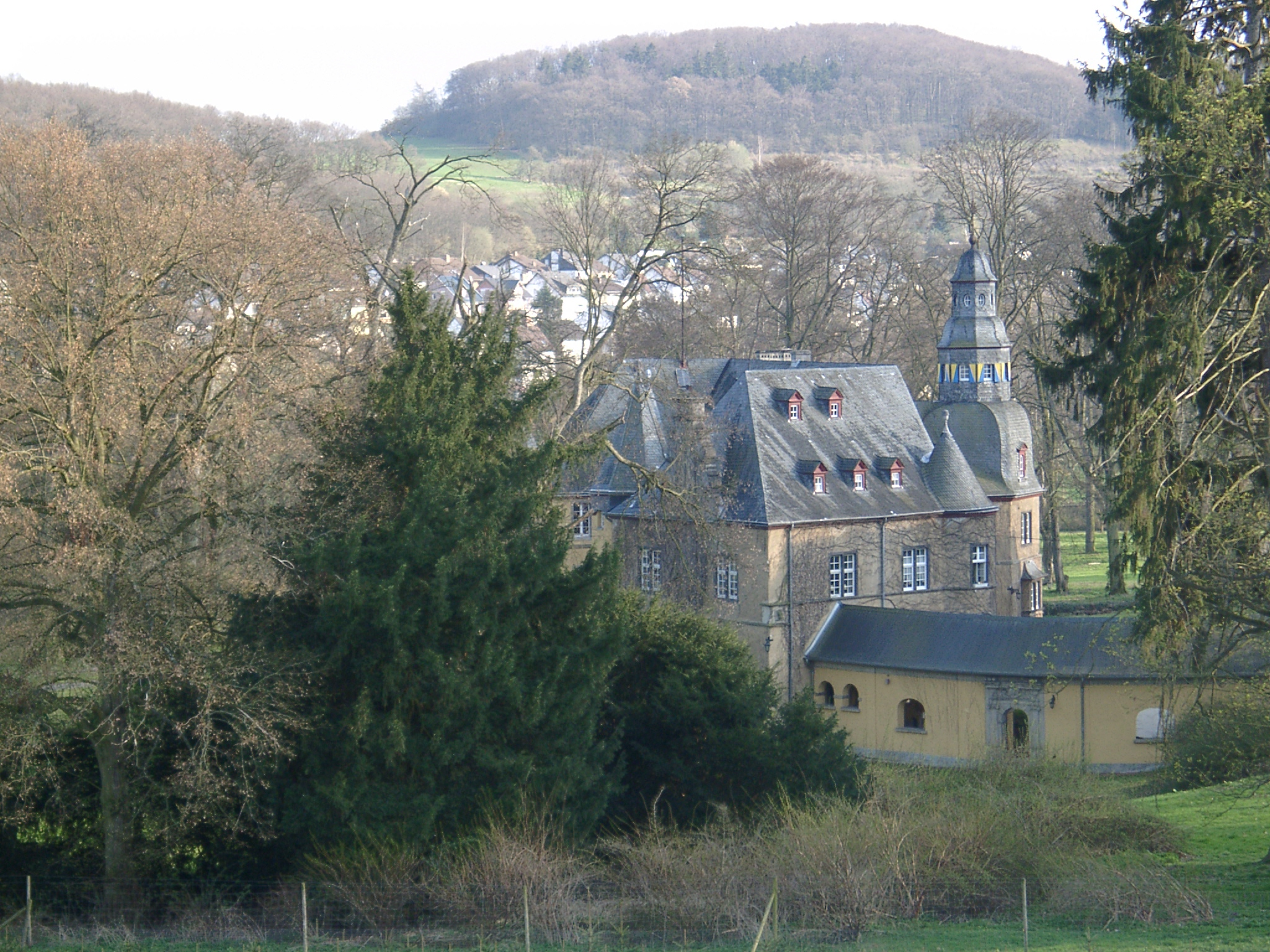
Bassenheim Castle near Koblenz in Germany (2005)

Dürckheim was born in Munich, the son of Friedrich Georg Michael Maria Eckbrecht von Dürckheim-Montmartin and Sophie Evalina Ottilie Charlotte von Kusserow. His maternal grandfather was the Prussian diplomat and politician Heinrich von Kusserow.

A descendant of old Bavarian nobility whose parents' fortune was lost during bad economic times, he grew up at Steingaden and at the Bassenheim Castle near Koblenz.

== Military service ==
In 1914 he volunteered for the Royal Bavarian Infantry Lifeguards Regiment and was given a commission. He served on the front lines for 46 months and fought in France, Serbia, Slovenia, Italy and Romania. He saw action at the Battle of Verdun, the Battle of Caporetto, the Battle of the Somme, and the Lys Offensive. By his own account he never fired a shot and was never wounded, "though bullets went through my shirt and coat." Dürckheim considered his war experience fundamental: "I discovered...that it was in facing death that we step forward toward true life. That experience was later a part of my teaching: by accepting death, we discover and receive life which is beyond life and death."

In recognition of his military service, Dürckheim was awarded the Honour Cross of the World War 1914/1918 and the War Merit Cross First Class with swords.

== Introduction to Eastern Thought ==
In 1919, as a 23-year-old officer on his return after the war, he refused to fight in defense of the Bavarian Socialist Republic, but instead joined the Freikorps under Franz Ritter von Epp (under whom he had served during World War I) and became involved in anti-Bolshevik activities, for which he was briefly imprisoned. Afterward, he worked as a journalist for several small anti-communist publications. He also rejected his inheritance of the family estate at Steingaden, to which he had a right as eldest son.

He met his first wife, Enja von Hattingberg (1888–1939), who introduced him to the Tao Te Ching of Lao-Tzu:

"My future wife, Madame von Hattingberg, was sitting on the table, and next to her was a book...I can still see it now. I opened this book and read out loud the eleventh verse of the Tao-Te-Ching of Lao Tzu. Suddenly it happened! I was listening and lightning went through me. The veil was torn asunder, I was awake! I had just experienced 'It'. Everything existed and nothing existed. Another Reality had broken through this world. I myself existed and did not exist...I had experienced that which is spoken of in all centuries: individuals, in whatever stage of their lives, have had an experience which struck them with the force of lightning and linked them once and for all to the circuits of True Life."

Meister Eckhart became very important for him. "I recognize in Eckhart my master, the master. But we can only approach him if we eliminate the conceptual consciousness."

== Academic career ==
Dürckheim received his doctorate in Psychology from the University of Kiel in 1923 and taught at the Institute of Psychology there for another year, then went to work with Felix Krueger and Hans Freyer at the University of Leipzig where he received his habilitation on 17 February 1930. In 1931 he became a professor at the Medical Academy of Breslau. From 1930 to 1932 Dürckheim also taught at the Bauhaus in Dessau in the field of Gestalt psychology. During the 1930s he was close friends with Karl Haushofer, Else Lasker-Schüler, Paul Klee, Romano Guardini and Rainer Maria Rilke.

On 11 November 1933 Dürckheim signed the commitment of the professors at German universities and colleges to Adolf Hitler and the Nazi state.

== Nazi career and years in Japan ==
In 1933 Dürckheim joined the Sturmabteilung. In 1934 he spent 6 months in South Africa on behalf of the Reich Minister of Education to contact Germans living there and to urge them not to abandon Nazism. During his visit he met secretly with the Afrikaner Broederbond to urge them to follow Nazi ideals, including anti-Semitism. By 1935 he had become chief assistant to Joachim von Ribbentrop, head of the Büro Ribbentrop and later Nazi Germany's Minister for Foreign Affairs. In that year Dürckheim brokered a meeting between Lord Beaverbrook and Hitler. In October 1936, Dürckheim accompanied newly appointed Ambassador Ribbentrop to England, where he was assigned "to find out what the English think of the new Germany." He was introduced to King Edward VIII and Winston Churchill. Dürckheim was at this time a fervent supporter of Nazism, writing in the Journal of the Nazi Teachers Association:

"The basic gift of the Nazi revolution is for all occupations and levels across the experience of our common nature, a common destiny, the common hope of the common leader....which is the living foundation of all movements and aspirations."

=== Jewish descent discovered ===
Then it was discovered that he was of Jewish descent.

- Dürckheim's maternal great-grandmother Eveline Oppenheim (1805-1886) was the daughter of the Jewish banker Salomon Oppenheim.
- Dürckheim was related to Mayer Amschel Rothschild.
- Dürckheim's maternal grandmother was Antonie Springer, who was Jewish.

Under Germany's 1935 Nuremberg Laws, he was considered a Mischling (mixed-blood) of the second degree (Note: The Reich Citizenship Law: First Regulation (November 14, 1935); Article 2 states "An individual of mixed Jewish blood is one who is descended from one or two grandparents who were racially full Jews...One grandparent shall be considered as full-blooded if he or she belonged to the Jewish religious community." Such individuals were forbidden to hold public office.) and had therefore become "politically embarrassing". Ribbentrop decided to create a special mission for him to become an envoy for the foreign ministry and write a research paper titled "exploring the intellectual foundations of Japanese education."

=== Zen and Nazism while envoy to Japan ===
In June 1938 he was sent to Japan, residing there until 1947. Soon after arriving in Japan he met the Buddhist scholar Daisetsu Teitaro Suzuki who influenced his thinking profoundly. Professor Fumio Hashimoto, who was sent to Dürckheim as a translator, wrote: "Dürckheim was surrounded by Shinto and Buddhist scholars, as well as military and thinkers of the right, each of which tried to convince him of their importance." These included such leading figures as the Abbot Hakuun Yasutani and the Imperial Japanese Army General Sadao Araki. He became a student of Kyūdō (traditional Japanese archery) under the master Awa Kenzô (1880-1939), who had also taught Eugen Herrigel. He wrote in 1941: "Archery is a great exercise that provides a profound silent concentration. In Zen the body is not considered an obstacle to spiritual life, as it is too often regarded in the West. On the contrary, [in Zen] the body is considered instrumental to spiritual advancement."

Under Ribbentrop's guidance, he coordinated the dissemination of Nazi propaganda in Japan, likening German military ideals to Japanese bushido and encouraging the idea that Japan and Germany would share the world. The “Zen Samurai Bushido debate” had evolved in pre-war Germany over the relationship between Nazi ideals and those of the traditional Japanese warrior culture. On 15 July 1939 Dürckheim published an article in the third issue of the journal Berlin - Rome - Tokio in which he refers to the Japanese state cult, the glorified “Samurai spirit” and its relationship with Nazi ideology and antisemitism in Japan. He wrote:

“Who travels today through Japan experiences at every step the friendship with Nazi Germany and Fascist Italy to the Japanese people, especially those forces that affect the future more than political power. It is the spirit which connects Japan with us, that spirit which…is related to Japan’s iron will to win the war… In farm houses and businesses hang signs with the words: Everyone must behave as if they were on the field of battle.”

By 1944, Dürckheim had become a well-known author and lecturer in Japan on Zen meditation, archery, and metaphysics, and was awarded the War Merit Cross, Second Class on Hitler's birthday, 20 April 1944. The impending surrender of Germany did not prevent him from reasserting his values. "The immeasurable suffering of Germany will bring the German people to a higher level and help give birth to a better, less materialistic nation," he wrote to a friend in the last days of the war.

=== Arrest and imprisonment in Japan ===
After the war, Tokyo was occupied by the Americans. Dürckheim went into hiding in Karuizawa and was arrested on 30 October 1945 by Special Agent Robie Macauley of the US Counter-Intelligence Corps after being identified as the chief of Nazi propaganda in Japan. He was imprisoned for 16 months in Sugamo Prison:

"In spite of everything, it was a very fertile period for me. During the first weeks, I had a dream almost every night, some of which anticipated my future work. In my cell I was surrounded by a profound silence. I could work on myself and that is when I began to write a novel. My neighbors simply waited for each day to pass. That time of captivity was precious to me because I could exercise zazen meditation and remain in immobility for hours."

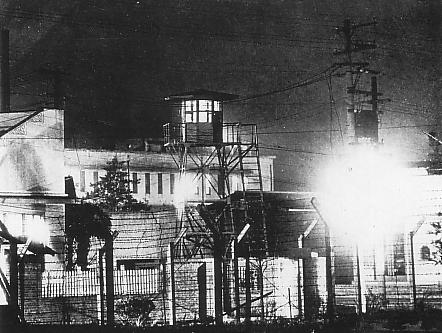
Sugamo Prison on 22 December 1948

=== Spiritual rebirth ===
Dürckheim interpreted his imprisonment as an initiation event that was preparing him for a spiritual rebirth. Influenced partly by the work of Julius Evola, the "conversion experience" later became an essential element of Dürckheim's psychotherapy: "There is real change whenever the individual experiences the supernatural, which alters the meaning of life 180 degrees and moves the axis from the middle of the natural human existence to a supernatural center."

The criteria of an initiation conversion are 1) the conscious confrontation with a near-death experience during one's lifetime; 2) the "overcoming of humanity"; and 3) the transition from the everyday mode of being to another, which Evola calls transcendental realism (the transition from the everyday mode of being to another spiritual plane).

== Work with Zen and psychotherapy ==
Dürckheim was repatriated to Germany in 1947 and began a period of training analysis with Leonhard Seif. At this time he began to develop his "Initiation Therapy", in which he merged several psychological directions. There is a strong influence from depth psychology, in particular the analytical psychology of Carl Gustav Jung and the psychodrama of Jacob Levy Moreno. Dürckheim employs similar elements of art (modelling clay, ink drawings) and drama (role-playing) in his form of therapy.

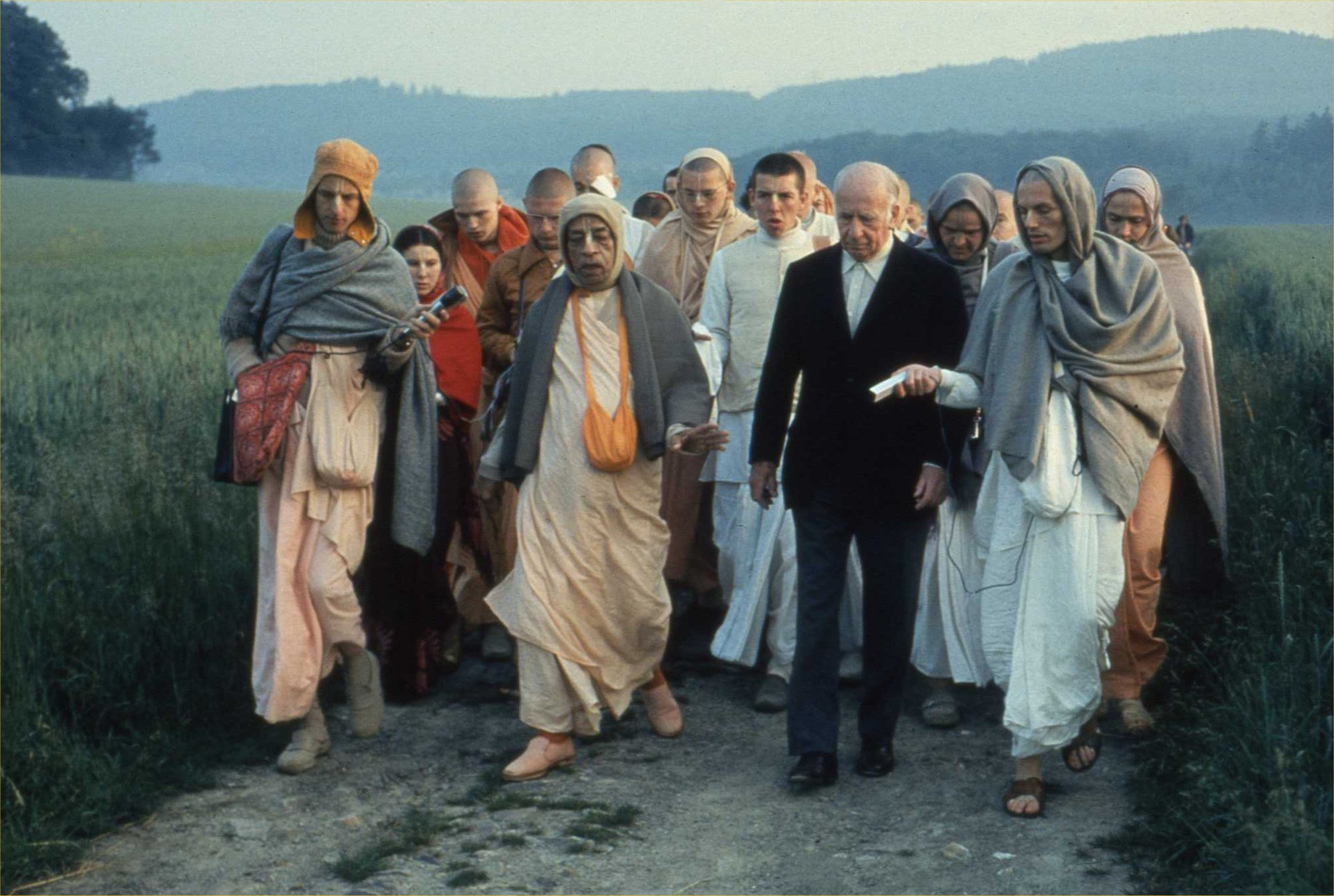
Dürckheim on a morning walk with Swami Prabhupada in Frankfurt in June 1974.

Along with his second wife, psychologist Maria Theresia Hippius (1909-2003), Dürckheim founded the Existential Psychology Training and Conference Center in the early 1950s, located in the Black Forest village of Todtmoos-Rutte. His books were based on his conferences.

"What I am doing is not the transmission of Zen Buddhism; on the contrary, that which I seek after is something universally human which comes from our origins and happens to be more emphasized in eastern practices than in the western."

In 1958 Dürckheim met Episcopalian priest Alan Watts, who described him as "...a true nobleman--unselfconsciously and by a long tradition perfect in speech and courtesy--Keyserling's ideal of the grand seigneur."

Dürckheim is identified by Albert Stunkard as the person who suggested that Stunkard should visit D. T. Suzuki in Kita-Kamakura, not far from the Sugamo prison. Stunkard later became Suzuki's psychiatrist.

In 1972 Dürckheim received the Humboldt plaque from the Humboldt Society of Science, Art and Culture, and in 1977 he was awarded the Officer's Merit Cross, 1st Class.

Dürckheim died in Todtmoos on 28 December 1988 at the age of 92.

== Theory of therapeutic self-transformation ==
Dürckheim did not practice psychotherapy in the traditional sense, rather, he tried to teach his clients a process by which they could move towards spiritual self-understanding. He viewed the therapist as a spiritual guide: "A therapy which does not take into account the spirituality of man is doomed to failure...The therapist is not the one who heals, that is, who intervenes with his own skills; he is a therapist in the original meaning of the word: a companion on the way."

=== Concept of the self ===
Dürckheim readily acknowledged that he was influenced by other psychologists in the development of his theory of the self:

"In these last twenty years, the work of C. G. Jung and of his disciple Erich Neumann have greatly enriched me. Their theory of "self" corresponds to my concept of essential being. For them the true self is the integration of the deep self with the existential one, which alone gives birth to the person. This is what struck me: C.G.Jung has opened the way to initiation."

Dürckheim's "Initiation Therapy" deals with the encounter between the profane, mundane, "little" self (the ego) and the true Self:

"Man evolves through three kinds of "self": first, the "little self" who only sees power, security, prestige, knowledge. Then the "existential self" which goes much further: it wants to give itself to a cause, to a task, to a community, to a person. It can go beyond egocentrism and that is where it becomes, in my opinion, a human being. Finally what I call the "essential self," the true "I" of the individual and of humanity."

=== The Wheel of Metamorphosis ===
An integral concept in this self-understanding is referred to as "The Wheel of Metamorphosis." Dürckheim viewed transformation not as the sudden achievement of enlightenment, but rather as a continuous and cyclical evolution, akin to the motion of a wheel. He posited three stages and five steps in each cycle:

- Stage 1: All that is contrary to essential being must be relinquished.
- Step 1: Practice "critical watchfulness" (analytical awareness of one's own thoughts and behavior).
- Step 2: Let go of all that stands in the way of becoming.
- Stage 2: That which has been relinquished must be dissolved in transcendent Being which absorbs and recreates us.
- Step 3: Union with transcendent Being.
- Step 4: New becoming in accordance with the inner image which has arisen from transcendent Being.
- Stage 3: The newly formed core must be recognized and personal responsibility taken for its growth.
- Step 5: Practicing this new form on a daily basis through critical watchfulness, which leads us back to Step 1.

=== Meditation ===
For Dürckheim, meditation exercises are the key to spiritual change:

"Exercise has a double purpose: to prepare the individual for the possibility of an experience of Being and for his metamorphosis into a witness of this experience awakening within. For illumination does not make an enlightened one! The more I penetrated into the experience and the wisdom of the exercise of Buddhism, the more it was clear that here was a universal understanding of the human being and his possibilities. This was a vision which, taking into account the liberation and salvation of man through health, efficiency and social fidelity, apprehended man in his deepest essence, whose experience and integration were also the conditions for the development of his true Self."

== Quotations ==
"The man, who, being really on the Way, falls upon hard times in the world will not, as a consequence, turn to that friend who offers him refuge and comfort and encourages his old self to survive. Rather, he will seek out someone who will faithfully and inexorably help him to risk himself, so that he may endure the suffering and pass courageously through it. Only to the extent that man exposes himself over and over again to annihilation, can that which is indestructible arise within him. In this lies the dignity of daring."
– from The Way of Transformation, 1988.

"Perseverance can bring a state of ‘self-lessness’ in which you are released from the division of subject and object, which ordinarily dominates consciousness. In that state you can finally experience the perfect enjoyment of the unity inherent in it. You may even taste the joys of an experience which determines all further experience: ‘It is not I who am breathing, it breathes and I merely have a share as a union of body and soul.'"
- from The Japanese Cult of Tranquility, 1960.

"A great deal of my present work is in helping people who underwent great spiritual crisis during the war. We know, of course, that sometimes, in extreme circumstances, people have a natural satori or spiritual awakening when it appears that all is finished for them–and they accept it. This happened often in the war, and when those who lived through it tried to tell the tale to their friends it was shrugged off as some kind of hallucination, a brief fit of insanity in a desperate situation. When these people come to me, as they often do, I have the happy opportunity of showing them that, for once in their lives, they were truly sane."
- quoted in Alan Watts, In My Own Way: An Autobiography 1915–1965, 1973, p. 321.

== Books ==
- Hara: The Vital Center of Man. Inner Traditions. 2004-10-27. ISBN 978-1-59477-024-1.
- Zen and Us. Arkana Publishing, 1991. English. 144 pp. ASIN: B00072HEP0
- The Call for the Master. Penguin (Non-Classics). 1993-04-01. ISBN 978-0-14-019345-9.
- Absolute Living: The Otherworldly in the World and the Path to Maturity. Penguin (Non-Classics). 1992. ISBN 978-0-14-019452-4.
- The Way of Transformation: Daily Life as Spiritual Exercise (London: Allen & Unwin, 1971)
- The Japanese cult of tranquility. Rider, 1960. English. 106 pp. ASIN: B0006AXFRE.
- Our Two-Fold Origin, Allen & Unwin; (January 6, 1983); ISBN 004291017X, 183 pages
- Wunderbare Katze, Otto Wilhelm Barth (February 1, 2011); ISBN 3426291150 (in German)

== Sources ==
- Alphonse Goettmann; Rachel Goettmann (2009-11-23). Becoming Real: Essays on the Teachings of a Master. Theosis Books. ISBN 978-0966496079.
- Graf Karlfried Dürckheim; Alphonse Goettmann (1991-01-01). Dialogue on the Path of Initiation: An Introduction to the Thought of Karlfried Graf Dürckheim. Globe Press. ISBN 978-0-936385-27-3.
- Hans Thomas Hakl, "Karlfried Graf Dürckheim", in: Wouter J. Hanegraaff: Dictionary of Gnosis & Western Esotericism. Vol. I. Brill, Leiden 2005, pp. 323–325.
- Gerhard Wehr (1988). Karlfried Graf Dürckheim: Ein Leben im Zeichen der Wandlung. Kosel. ISBN 978-3466342136.
