= Rüdiger Sünner =

German writer and documentary filmmaker

Rüdiger Sünner (born 1953 in Cologne) is a German writer and documentary filmmaker. He is most notable for his documentary film and his non-fiction book about the Black Sun symbol.

== Biography ==
From 1972 to 1985, he studied music, music science, German, and philosophy. Besides being a musician in different pop groups and training activity as a flutist.

In 1985 he graduated in the art and philosophy of Theodor W. Adorno and Friedrich Nietzsche.

From 1986 to 1991, he studied at the Deutsche Film- und Fernsehakademie Berlin (DFFB).

Since 1991 he has operated as a writer, film producer, and musician in Berlin.

== Schwarze Sonne ==
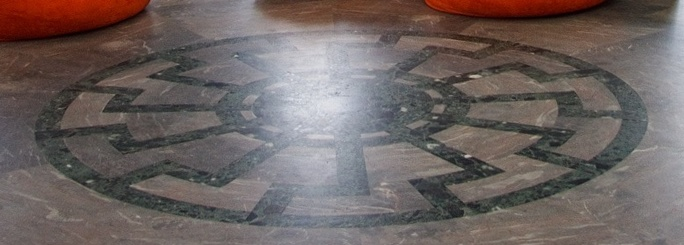
The Wewelsburg mosaic depicting the Black Sun symbol

Schwarze Sonne ("Black Sun") is the title of both a 1998 documentary film and a 1999 non-fiction book by Rüdiger Sünner. They explore the occult roots of Nazism.

While filming at Wewelsburg, Sünner was allegedly threatened by a white power skinhead brandishing his fist with a Black Sun tattoo. Apparently, he regarded Sünner's film as a desecration.

Critic Mark Hennessey stated that while the film explored the relationships between Nazism and pre-Christian mythology, it did so in a "limited—interesting still, but not truly fresh" way. A documentary television series, The Occult History of the Third Reich, provided "more archival footage", "greater depth", and "broader historical context".
