= Edda Manga =

Swedish historian

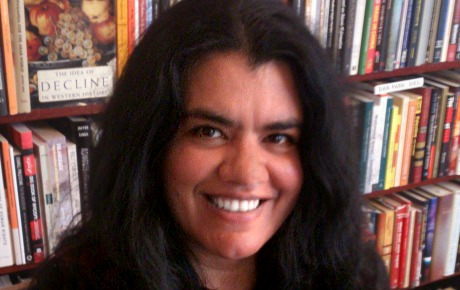
Edda Manga

Edda Manga (born 1969) is a Swedish historian of ideas, speaker and debator.

== Early life and education ==
Manga was born in Bogota, Colombia. She moved to Sweden when she was 17 years old.

== Career ==
On 14 June 2004, she was a summer host on Sveriges Radio P1 during Sommar i P1 o. In 2004, Manga won the Clio award for her doctorate thesis Gudomliga uppenbarelser och demoniska samlag ("Divine revelations and demonic intercourses"). In 2011 she together with her husband was a speaker at the summer camp of the Communist Party in Sweden, though she is not a member.

Since January 2016 she has worked as a researcher at Mångkulturellt centrum (tr: Multicultural center). As of 2017, Manga was active in public debates and a defender of Muslim women in Sweden to wear the hijab. She has been criticised for trivialising the issue of women as victims of violent honor cultures in Sweden.

== Personal life ==
Manga is married to historian Mattias Gardell. They were aboard MV Mavi Marmara as part of the flotilla which tried to break the Israeli embargo of the Gaza Strip, before Israeli armed forces attacked the flotilla on the morning of 31 May 2010. Manga was deported from Israel and landed in Sweden on 3 June along with her husband and other Swedish left-wing activists. She denied allegations of IHH being a militant Islamist organisation, saying "They are not turkish islamists. They are a muslim organisation working with humanitarian aid in 143 countries." She further called the Israeli action irrational.

== Works ==
- Att mäta rasism (with Mattias Gardell, Alireza Behtoui, René León Rosales and Alexander Ekelund) (2020)
- Utvägar - feministiska allianser för en solidarisk framtid (editor) (2015)
- Slöjor, Authors Elin Berge, Edda Manga, Atlas, 2006, ISBN 978-91-7389-205-6
- Gudomliga uppenbarelser och demoniska samlag Glänta produktion, 2003, ISBN 978-91-628-5276-4
- Santas visiones y pecados extraordinarios Cecilia Rodríguez, Editor Edda Manga, Göteborgs universitet, 2002, ISBN 978-91-631-2459-4
