= Hans Thomas Hakl =

Austrian publisher and translator (born 1947)

- Born: February 27, 1947 (age 79); Graz, Austria
- Other name: H. T. Hansen
- Education: Doctor of Law degree at Graz University (1970)
- Occupations: Austrian publisher, essayist and translator

Hans Thomas Hakl (born 27 February 1947) is an Austrian publisher, essayist and translator. He has used the signature H. T. Hakl, H.T.H., or the pseudonym H. T. Hansen.

== Biography ==
Hakl earned a Doctor of Law degree at Graz University in 1970. He founded an international trading company named HHS Handels AG (HHS Trading Company), based first in Zürich and then in Schwerzenbach. It had 14 daughter companies in 13 different countries and dealt with the Far East. He also founded the publishing house Ansata-Verlag, which specialized in studies on esotericism, based first in Schwarzenburg and then in Interlaken (Switzerland). In 1996, he created an academic journal focused on the study of esotericism, Gnostika, of which he remains co-editor to this date.

Hakl has contributed material on matters related to esotericism to several international dictionaries and journals, such as Politica Hermetica, where he publishes book reviews. He has published a book on the Eranos series of colloquia initiated by Carl Gustav Jung and attended by names such as Mircea Eliade and several specialists of western esotericism and religious studies. An English translation by Nicholas Goodrick-Clarke of his book Unknown Sources: National Socialism and the Occult, originally an appendix by Hakl to the 1997 German edition of Goodrick-Clarke's book The Occult Roots of Nazism, was published in 2000. He is the author of German translations of the works of Julius Evola. Hakl is the founder of the Octagon library, a private European library specializing in the history of religion and esotericism.

== Publications ==
=== Works/Colloquia ===
- Italian: Studi Evoliani 1998, Fondazione Julius Evola, 1999. (co-author)
- Russian: Дивногорск Х.Т.Хансен: ПОЛИТИЧЕСКИЕ УСТРЕМЛЕНИЯ ЮЛИУСА ЭВОЛЫ [Evola's politics]
- German: Der verborgene Geist von Eranos, Bretten, Scienta Nova, Neue Wissenschaft, 2001. (ISBN 978-3-935164-02-3)
- French: Julius Evola et la « révolution conservatrice » allemande, Deux Etendards, 2002. (under the pseudonym H.T. Hansen)
- English: Eranos, An Alternative Intellectual History of the Twentieth Century, Sheffield, Equinox, 2013, 440 p. (ISBN 978-1-78179-016-8)
- German: Octagon, Die Suche nach Volkommenheit (editor), Gaggenau, Scientia Nova, 2015, 481 p. (ISBN 978-3-935164-07-8)
- English: Octagon, The Quest for Wholeness, (editor), Gaggenau, Scientia Nova, 2016, 450 p. (ISBN 978-3-935164-08-5)
- Italian: Octagon, La ricerca della totalità, (editor), Gaggenau, Scientia Nova, 2017, 546 p. (ISBN 978-3-935164-10-8)
- French: Octagon, La recherche de perfection, (editor), Gaggenau, Scientia Nova, 2018, 433 p. (ISBN 978-3-935164-12-2)

=== Book chapters and articles ===
- (in German) "Nationalsozialismus und Okkultismus", in: Gnostika 1/January (p. 32–42), Gnostika 2/April (p. 26–35), Gnostika 3/July (p. 22–37), Sinzheim. 1997. Also, in: Aries 21 (p. 63–98), Paris, 1998. Italian translation: "Nazionalsocialismo ed Occultismo", in: Arthos (Nuova Serie) 1 (January–June, p. 16–27) and 2 (July–December, p. 57–75), Pontremoli, Centro Studi Evoliani, 1997. Shortened version in: Nicholas Goodrick-Clarke, Die okkulten Wurzeln des Nationalsozialismus, Leopold Stocker Verlag, Graz 1997, p. 194–217, English translation: National Socialism and the Occult, Edmonds, WA, Holmes Publishing Group, 2000. (ISBN 978-1-558184-70-1)
- (in French) "Giuseppe Tucci entre études orientales, ésoterisme et Fascisme (1894–1984)", Politica Hermetica Nr. 18, Lausanne, L’Age d’Homme, 2004, p. 119–136. (Slightly expanded version in: Archäus, fasc. 1–2, Bucarest, Association roumaine d’histoire des religions et Centre d’histoire des religions de l’Université de Bucarest, 2006, p. 231–250.)
- (in Italian) "La questione dei rapporti fra Julius Evola e Aleister Crowley", in: Arthos 13, Pontremoli, Centro Studi Evoliani, 2006, p. 269–289.
- "Maria de Naglowska and the Confrérie de la Flèche d’Or". In: Politica Hermetica, Nr. 20, Lausanne, L’Age d’Homme 2006, p. 113–123.
- (in French) "Julius Evola et l'histoire comparée des religions", in: Jean-Pierre Brach et Jérôme Rousse-Lacordaire (dir.), Études d'histoire de l'ésotérisme, Paris, Éditions du Cerf, 2007, p. 83-96, (ISBN 978-2-204-08210-5)
- (in Italian) "Breve storia della rivista 'Antaios' curata da Mircea Eliade ed Ernst Jünger", in: Francesco Zambon (éd.), Cenacoli, circoli e gruppi letterari, artistici, spirituali, Milano, Medusa, 2007.
- (in Italian) "Adonismo", in: Alessandro Grossato (éd.), Forme e correnti dell'esoterismo occidentale, Venezia, Mursia, 2008.
- (in Italian) " Introduction to: Julius Evola, Maschera e volto dello spiritualismo contemporaneo, Roma, Ed. Mediterranee, 2008.
- "The Theory and Practice of Sexual Magic, Exemplified by Four Magical Groups in the Early Twentieth Century", in: Wouter J. Hanegraaff and Jeffrey J. Kripal (Eds.), Hidden Intercourse. Eros and Sexuality in the History of Western Esotericism, Leiden, Brill, 2008, p. 445-478.
- "Julius Evola and the UR Group", in: Aries, 12, Leiden, Brill, 2012, p. 53-90.
- "The Magical Order of the Fraternitas Saturni". In: Occultism in a global perspective. They were edited by Henrik Bogdan and Gordan Djurdjevic, Durham 2013, p. 37-56, (ISBN 978-1844657162).
- "Some additional remarks on Julius Evola and Aleister Crowley", in: Marco Pasi, Aleister Crowley and the Temptation of Politics, Durham, Acumen, 2014, p. 141-162, (ISBN 978-1-84465-695-0)
- (in German) "Es war einmal ein junger Mann...Geschichte einer Bibliothek und persönliche Gedanken eines Sammlers", in: Octagon, Scientia Nova, Gaggenau, 2015, Vol. 1, pp. 13–25, (ISBN 978-3-935164-07-8)
- "Julius Evola and Tradition", in: Mark Sedwick (ed.), Key Thinkers of the Radical Right, Oxford University Press, Oxford, 2019, pp. 54–69.

=== Articles in dictionaries and encyclopaedias ===
- "Karlfried Graf Dürckheim", in: Wouter J. Hanegraaff: Dictionary of Gnosis & Western Esotericism. Vol. I. Brill, Leiden 2005, pp. 323–325.
- "Giulio Evola", in: Wouter J. Hanegraaff: Dictionary of Gnosis & Western Esotericism. Vol. I. Brill, Leiden 2005, pp. 345–350.
- "Fraternitas Saturni", in: Wouter J. Hanegraaff: Dictionary of Gnosis & Western Esotericism. Vol. I. Brill, Leiden 2005, pp. 379–382.
- "Max Heindel", in: Wouter J. Hanegraaff: Dictionary of Gnosis & Western Esotericism. Vol. I. Brill, Leiden 2005, pp. 462–464.
- "Sexuality: Sexual Rites in Europe (based on Ioan Petru Culianu)", in: Lindsay Jones (Ed.): Encyclopedia of Religion. 2a ed., Macmillan, New York 2005, pp. 8247–8254.
- "Julius Evola" In: Lindsay Jones (Ed.): Encyclopedia of Religion. 2a ed., Macmillan, New York 2005, pp. 2904–2907.

=== Translations ===
- (in German) Julius Evola, Revolte gegen die moderne Welt, Ansata, Interlaken 1982.
- (in German) Julius Evola, "Gruppe von Ur, Magie als Wissenschaft vom Ich". Band I. Ansata, Interlaken 1985. (H. T. Hansen). 2. Auflage. (ISBN 978-3-715700-72-4).
- (in German) Julius Evola, Die hermetische Tradition. Ansata, Interlaken 1989. (H.T. Hansen). 4. Auflage. (ISBN 978-3-778770-42-9).
- (in German) Julius Evola, Gruppe von Ur, Schritte zur Initiation. Magie als Wissenschaft vom Ich. Band II: Theorie und Praxis des höheren Bewusstseins. Ansata, Berne-Munich-Vienne, 1997. (H. T. Hansen). (ISBN 978-3-778770-43-6).

== Bibliography ==
- (in German) Die wahre Magie ist ein Akt der Liebe, 3rd edition and bibliography of H. T. Hakl for his 60th birthday, AAGW, Sinzheim, 2007, (ISBN 978-3-937592-14-5).
- (in English) Baroni, Francesco. “The Philosophical Gold of Perennialism. Hans Thomas Hakl, Julius Evola and the Italian Esoteric Milieus.” Religiographies, vol. 2, no.1 (2023): 39–58.
