= Journal of European Studies =

- Discipline: European studies
- Language: English
- Edited by: Julian Preece (Swansea University)

Publication details
- History: 1971-present
- Publisher: SAGE Publications
- Frequency: Quarterly

Standard abbreviations
- ISO 4: J. Eur. Stud.

Indexing
- ISSN: 0047-2441 (print); 1740-2379 (web)
- LCCN: 74648576
- OCLC no.: 39082464

Links
- Journal homepage; Online access; Online archive

The Journal of European Studies is a quarterly peer-reviewed academic journal that covers the field of European studies especially the cultural history of Europe since the Renaissance. John Flower (University of Kent) is a founding member of the journal, and the current editor-in-chief. The journal was established in 1971 and is currently published by SAGE Publications.

== Abstracting and indexing ==
The Journal of European Studies is abstracted and indexed in:

- Academic Search Elite
- Academic Search Premier
- Arts & Humanities Citation Index
- British Humanities Index
- Current Contents/Arts & Humanities
- Scopus
