= Ernst Schertel =

German writer (1884–1958)

Ernst Schertel (20 June 1884 – 30 January 1958) was a German author, probably best known for his 1923 Magic: History, Theory and Practice. He had an "astonishingly diverse career" including running an eight-member dance troupe, Traumbuehne Schertel, active from 1925 to 1927. From 1927 to 1931 Schertel edited ASA – Das Magazin für Körper, Kunst und neues Leben.

Schertel's Magic: History, Theory and Practice was found to be one of the most-heavily annotated books in Adolf Hitler's personal library. "Hitler’s extensive markings (sixty-six in all) in his copy of Magic were in the form of vertical lines in the margins."

== Publications ==
- Die Nachtwandlerin (drama) 1909.
- Schellings Metaphysik der Persönlichkeit (dissertation) Quelle & Meyer, Leipzig 1911.
- Die Sünde des Ewigen oder Dies ist mein Leib (novel) Die Wende, Berlin 1918.
- Das Blut der Schwester (occult movie in five acts). Wende Film, München 1922.
- Magic: History, Theory and Practice. Anthropos-Verlag, Prien 1923.
- François Grillard [pseudonym]: Das Mädchenschloß (privately published), ca. 1930.
- Der Flagellantismus als literarisches Motiv, 4 Bde. 1929–1932.
- Der Flagellantismus in Literatur und Bildnerei, 12 Bde. Decker Vlg., Schmiden b. Stuttgart 1957 (enlarged ed. of Der Flagellantismus als literarisches Motiv).

== See also ==
- Occultism in Nazism
