= Nicholas Goodrick-Clarke =

British historian (1953–2012)

- Goodrick-Clarke in his office
- Born: 15 January 1953; Lincoln, Lincolnshire, United Kingdom
- Died: 29 August 2012 (aged 59); Torquay, United Kingdom
- Occupations: Historian, professor, bank manager, translator
- Spouse: Clare Badham (m. 1985)

Academic background
- Education: University of Bristol (B.A.); St Edmund Hall, Oxford (D.Phil.)
- Thesis: The Ariosophists of Austria and Germany, 1890–1935: Reactionary Political Fantasy in Relation to Social Anxiety (1982)

Academic work
- Main interests: Western esotericism, occultism in Nazism
- Notable works: The Occult Roots of Nazism (1985); Hitler's Priestess (1998); Black Sun (2002)

Nicholas Goodrick-Clarke (15 January 1953 – 29 August 2012) was a British historian and professor of Western esotericism at the University of Exeter, best known for his authorship of several scholarly books on the history of occultism in Nazism and Western esotericism, including The Occult Roots of Nazism, Hitler's Priestess, and Black Sun.

He edited and translated several other books, and edited two academic book series on religion and esotericism. Goodrick-Clarke was the founder and director of the Exeter Centre for the Study of Esotericism (EXESESO), and the co-founder of the European Society for the Study of Western Esotericism.

== Early life and education ==
Nicholas Goodrick-Clarke was born in Lincoln, England, on 15 January 1953, to David and Phyllis Goodrick-Clarke (née Gilbert). His father was a lawyer. Nicholas was the pair's only son, though his father had another son, Andrew.

Goodrick-Clarke was an Open Exhibitioner at Lancing College. He studied German, politics, and philosophy at the University of Bristol, and gained a Bachelor of Arts with distinction in 1974. Moving to St Edmund Hall, Oxford, Goodrick-Clarke obtained a D.Phil. in 1983.

== Career ==
During his education he worked as a schoolmaster, first in Perth, Scotland from 1978 to 1980, before moving to Schelklingen in West Germany until 1981, and at Cambridge until 1982. From 1982 to 1985, he was the manager of the Chase Manhattan Bank in London. He also worked on a fundraiser for the Campaign for Oxford. He was made a visiting scholar at Fitzwilliam College, Cambridge in Cambridge in 1982.

In 1987, he was involved in the investigation of Austrian president Kurt Waldheim for war crimes. With two other researchers he visited Germany, and was told to investigate Waldheim's ties to the Nazis; he acted as an interpreter, interviewer, and researcher for the investigation. He was also the director of IKON Productions starting in 1988. In 1992, he became the vice-chairman of Keston College, and convinced the college to move to Oxford.

In 2002, he was appointed a Research Fellow in Western Esotericism at the University of Lampeter. In 2005 he was appointed to a personal chair of western esotericism in the Department of History at Exeter University. It was the third university to create a chair dedicated to esotericism.

Goodrick-Clarke was the founder and director of the Exeter Centre for the Study of Esotericism (EXESESO) within the College of Humanities at Exeter. He was a co-founder of the European Society for the Study of Western Esotericism (ESSWE), the founder of the Association for the Study of Esotericism (ASE), and was a founding member of the American Association for the Study of Esotericism. He edited Aquarian Press's Essential Readings anthology series on religion and esotericism from 1986 on. He also edited for North Atlantic Books their Western Esoteric Masters series, which gives biographies on central esoteric figures and anthologies of their writings.

== Works ==
Goodrick-Clarke described his research interests as "globalization of esotericism in modernity; Paracelsica; Rosicrucianism; Hermeticism, pietism and alchemy in the Enlightenment era; esotericism and modern political ideology; conspiracy theory". His 1982 Oxford Ph.D. dissertation, The Ariosophists of Austria and Germany, 1890–1935: Reactionary Political Fantasy in Relation to Social Anxiety, was the basis for his most influential work, The Occult Roots of Nazism.

This book is about the connections between Nazism and occultism. Goodrick-Clarke wrote that he found the previous discussion of the connection to be "a literature rich in mystery and suggestion, but short on facts and hard evidence", but that after looking into it he found "there was a hard kernel of truth" to the connection, the improbable accounts disregarded, once he had done historical research. The Occult Roots of Nazism has been translated into twelve languages and has been in print since its first publication in 1985.

He wrote a 1987 work on Welsh mystic Arthur Machen. In 1998, Goodrick-Clarke wrote a biography of the fascist writer and esoteric Hitlerist Savitri Devi, titled Hitler's Priestess. He wrote another book as a follow-up to The Occult Roots of Nazism, Black Sun, published in 2002, focusing on modern occult kinds of neo-Nazism. His final book, The Western Esoteric Traditions: A Historical Introduction, was published by Oxford University Press in 2008. He also contributed several chapters to academic edited volumes and encyclopaedias.

Goodrick-Clarke edited several books. In 1990, he edited and translated the book Paracelsus: Essential Readings, a collection of the writings of the alchemist Paracelsus, which was later reissued as part of the Western Esoteric Masters series. In 2005 he edited a collection on Helena Blavatsky titled Helena Blavatsky, also part of the Western Esoteric Masters series. He and his wife co-edited and prefaced the book G.R.S. Mead and the Gnostic Quest in 2005, about Theosophist G. R. S. Mead. Goodrick-Clarke also translated several books, including in 2002 Emanuel Swedenborg: Visionary Savant in the Age of Reason by Ernst Benz and Western Esotericism: A Brief History of Secret Knowledge by Kocku von Stuckrad in 2005.

== Personal life ==
Outside of his studies, Goodrick-Clarke had an interest in photography and steam trains. He was involved in a society that read papers on esoteric subjects. As the members were unable to come up with a better name, the group was simply called "The Society". Other members of The Society included Clare Badham, Gerald Suster, and Ellic Howe. He was fluent in German.

Goodrick-Clarke married Clare Radene Badham, a scholar of English literature and publisher, on 11 May 1985. With her he ran a publishing house. She has also written several books on esoteric and alchemical topics, and was also a member of EXESESO. They had a silver wedding in 2010.

== Death and legacy ==
Goodrick-Clarke died on 29 August 2012, in Torquay, of pancreatic cancer. Following his death, the university decided to close EXESESO.

The 2021 academic book Innovation in Esotericism from the Renaissance to the Present, edited by Georgiana D. Hedesan and Tim Rudbøg, was dedicated to him. The editors describe him as "one of the foremost pioneering scholars of the academic study of Western Esotericism".

In 2021, Christian Giudice described The Occult Roots of Nazism as Goodrick-Clarke's "magnum opus", and as a "ground-breaking work" that decades later "stood the test of time, and it is still today considered as one of the most important works on the topic".

== Bibliography ==
=== Authored ===
- —— (1985). The Occult Roots of Nazism: The Ariosophists of Austria and Germany, 1890–1935. Wellingborough: Aquarian Press. ISBN 0-85030-402-4.
- —— (1998). Hitler's Priestess: Savitri Devi, the Hindu-Aryan Myth, and Neo-Nazism. New York University Press. ISBN 0-8147-3110-4.
- —— (2002). Black Sun: Aryan Cults, Esoteric Nazism and the Politics of Identity. New York University Press. ISBN 0-8147-3124-4.
- —— (2008). The Western Esoteric Traditions: A Historical Introduction. Oxford University Press. ISBN 978-0-19-532099-2.

=== Edited ===
- ——, ed. (1990). Paracelsus: Essential Readings. Wellingborough: Crucible. ISBN 1-85274-066-3.
  - ——, ed. (1999). Paracelsus: Essential Readings. Berkeley: North Atlantic Books. ISBN 1-55643-316-6.
- ——, ed. (2004). Helena Blavatsky. Berkeley: North Atlantic Books. ISBN 1-55643-457-X.
- Goodrick-Clarke, Clare; ——, eds. (2005). G.R.S. Mead and the Gnostic Quest. Berkeley: North Atlantic Books. ISBN 1-55643-572-X.

=== Translations ===
- Groll, Ursula (2000). Swedenborg and New Paradigm Science. Translated by ——. West Chesters: Swedenborg Foundation Publishers. ISBN 0-87785-643-5.
- Benz, Ernst (2002). Emanuel Swedenborg: Visionary Savant in the Age of Reason. Translated by ——. Introduction by Nicholas Goodrick-Clarke. West Chester: Swedenborg Foundation. ISBN 0-87785-623-0.
- Hakl, Hans Thomas (2005). Unknown Sources: National Socialism and the Occult. Translated by ——. Sequim: Holmes Publishing. ISBN 1-55818-470-8.
- von Stuckrad, Kocku (2005). Western Esotericism: A Brief History of Secret Knowledge. Translated by ——. Introduction by Nicholas Goodrick-Clarke. Sheffield: Equinox Publishing. ISBN 1-84553-033-0.
