= Esoteric neo-Nazism =

Mystical interpretations and adaptations of Nazism

The Black Sun emblem, representing the celestial homeland of the mythical Hyperboreans and the invisible source of their energy.

Esoteric neo-Nazism, also known as esoteric Nazism, esoteric fascism or esoteric Hitlerism, represents a fusion of Nazi ideology with mystical, occult, and esoteric traditions. This belief system emerged in the aftermath of World War II, as adherents sought to reinterpret and adapt the ideas of the Third Reich within the context of a new religious movement. Esoteric Nazism is characterized by its emphasis on the mythical and spiritual dimensions of Aryan supremacy, drawing from a range of sources including Theosophy, Ariosophy, and Gnostic dualism.

== Post-war history and notable exponents ==
=== Savitri Devi ===
Greek writer Savitri Devi was the first major post-war exponent of what has since become known as Esoteric Hitlerism. According to that ideology, subsequent to the fall of the Third Reich and Hitler's suicide at the end of the war, Hitler himself could be deified. Devi connected Hitler's Aryanist ideology to that of the pan-Hindu part of the Indian independence movement, and activists such as Subhas Chandra Bose. For her, the swastika was an especially important symbol, as she felt it symbolized Aryan unity of Hindus and Germans.

Savitri Devi, above all, was interested in the Indian caste system, which she regarded as the archetype of racial laws intended to govern the segregation of different races and to maintain the pure blood of the fair-complexioned Aryans. She regarded the survival of the minority of Brahmins among an enormous population of many different Indian races after sixty centuries as a living tribute to the value of the Aryan caste system.

Savitri Devi integrated Nazism into a broader cyclical framework of Hindu history. She considered Hitler to be the ninth Avatar of Vishnu, and called him "the god-like Individual of our times; the Man against Time; the greatest European of all times", having an ideal vision of returning his Aryan people to an earlier, more perfect time, and also having the practical wherewithal to fight the destructive forces "in Time". She saw his defeat—and the forestalling of his vision from coming to fruition—as a result of him being "too magnanimous, too trusting, too good", of not being merciless enough, of having in his "psychological make-up, too much 'sun' [beneficence] and not enough 'lightning.' [practical ruthlessness]", unlike his coming incarnation:

"Kalki" will act with unprecedented ruthlessness. Contrarily to Adolf Hitler, He will spare not a single one of the enemies of the divine Cause: not a single one of its outspoken opponents but also not a single one of the lukewarm, of the opportunists, of the ideologically heretical, of the racially bastardised, of the unhealthy, of the hesitating, of the all-too-human; not a single one of those who, in body or in character or mind, bear the stamp of the fallen Ages.

=== Robert Charroux ===
Unlike most ancient astronaut writers, Robert Charroux took a large interest in racialism. According to Charroux, Hyperborea was situated between Iceland and Greenland and was the home of a Nordic white race with blonde hair and blue eyes. Charroux wrote that this race was extraterrestrial in origin and had originally come from a cold planet situated far from the sun. Charroux also wrote that the white race of the Hyperboreans and their descendants, the Celts, had dominated the whole world in the ancient past. Some of these claims of Charroux have influenced the beliefs of esoteric Nazism such as the work of Miguel Serrano.

=== Miguel Serrano ===
Miguel Serrano, a former Chilean diplomat, was a major figure in esoteric Nazism. Author of numerous books including The Golden Ribbon: Esoteric Hitlerism (1978) and Adolf Hitler, the Last Avatar (1984), Serrano was one of a number of Nazi esotericists who regard the "Aryan blood" as originally extraterrestrial:

Serrano finds mythological evidence for the extraterrestrial origins of man in the Nephilim [fallen angels] of the Book of Genesis... Serrano suggests that the sudden appearance of Cro-Magnon Man with his high artistic and cultural achievements in prehistoric Europe records the passage of one such divya-descended race alongside the abysmal inferiority of Neanderthal Man, an abomination and manifest creation of the demiurge... Of all the races on earth, the Aryans alone preserve the memory of their divine ancestors in their noble blood, which is still mingled with the light of the Black Sun. All other races are the progeny of the demiurge's beast-men, native to the planet.

Serrano supported this idea from various myths which assign divine ancestry to 'Aryan' peoples, and even the Aztec myth of Quetzalcoatl descending from Venus. He also cited the hypothesis of Bal Gangadhar Tilak on the Arctic homeland of the Indo-Aryans, as his authority for identifying the earthly centre of the Aryan migrations with the 'lost' Arctic continent of Hyperborea. Thus, Serrano's extraterrestrial gods are also identified as Hyperboreans. (Note: Serrano finds supporting evidence in, for example, the Irish legends (recorded in the Book of Invasions) which tell of divine ancestors, Tuatha Dé Danann, arriving from the northern islands; and the Greek tradition according to which Apollo returned every 19 years to Hyperborea in the far north in order to rejuvenate his body and wisdom (Goodrick-Clarke 2002).)

In attempting to raise the spiritual development of the earthbound races, the Hyperborean divyas (a Sanskrit term for god-men) suffered a tragic setback. Expanding on a story from the Book of Enoch, Serrano lamented that a renegade group among the gods committed miscegenation with the terrestrial races, thus diluting the light-bearing blood of their benefactors and diminishing the level of divine awareness on the planet.

The concept of Hyperborea had a simultaneously racial and mystical meaning for Serrano. He believed that Hitler was in Shambhala, an underground centre in Antarctica (formerly at the North Pole and Tibet), where he was in contact with the Hyperborean gods and whence he would someday emerge with a fleet of UFOs to lead the forces of light (the Hyperboreans, sometimes associated with Vril) over the forces of darkness (inevitably including, for Serrano, those of the Abrahamic religions who worship the Abrahamic god) in a last battle and thus inaugurating a Fourth Reich.

Serrano follows the Gnostic tradition of the Cathars (fl. 1025–1244) by identifying the evil demiurge as Jehovah, the God of the Old Testament. As medieval dualists, these eleventh-century heretics had repudiated Jehovah as a false god and mere artificer opposed to the real God far beyond our earthly realm. This Gnostic doctrine clearly carried dangerous implications for the Jews. As Jehovah was the tribal deity of the Jews, it followed that they were devil worshipers. By casting the Jews in the role of the children of Satan, the Cathar heresy can elevate anti-Semitism to the status of a theological doctrine backed by a vast cosmology. If the Hyperborean Aryans are the archetype and blood descendents of Serrano's divyas from the Black Sun, then the archetype of the Lord of Darkness needed a counter-race. The demiurge sought and found the most fitting agent for its archetype in the Jews.

As religious scholars Frederick C. Grant and Hyam Maccoby emphasize, in the view of the dualist Gnostics, "Jews were regarded as the special people of the Demiurge and as having the special historical role of obstructing the redemptive work of the High God's emissaries".

=== David Myatt ===
In the 1980s and 1990s, David Myatt developed an interpretation—or revisionist version—of Nazism which, although based on Savitri Devi's three principles of "above", "against", and "in time" individuals, did not involve either ancient mythology or extraterrestrial beings.

Instead, Myatt, described as "most commonly associated with the occult wing of the National Socialist movement, focused—in pamphlets such as The Meaning of National Socialism, The Enlightenment of National Socialism and his The Religion of National Socialism—on what he described as "the numinous" aspects of Nazism, with Jeffrey Kaplan writing that Myatt described Nazism as "unambiguously a religion while Adolf Hitler is treated unashamedly as the saviour of mankind."

== Concepts and themes ==
=== Collective Aryan unconscious ===
In the book Black Sun, Nicholas Goodrick-Clarke reports how Carl Gustav Jung described "Hitler as possessed by the archetype of the collective Aryan unconscious and could not help obeying the commands of an inner voice". In a series of interviews between 1936 and 1939, Jung characterized Hitler as an archetype, often manifesting itself to the complete exclusion of his own personality. "'Hitler is a spiritual vessel, a demi-divinity; even better, a myth. Benito Mussolini is a man' ... the messiah of Germany who teaches the virtue of the sword. 'The voice he hears is that of the collective unconscious of his race'".

Jung's suggestion that Hitler personified the collective Aryan unconscious deeply interested and influenced Miguel Serrano, who later concluded that Jung was merely psychologizing the ancient, sacred mystery of archetypal possession by the gods, independent metaphysical powers that rule over their respective races and occasionally possess their members.

=== Black Sun and extraterrestrial theories ===
The Black Sun is a significant symbol in esoteric Nazism. Godwin and other writers such as Nicholas Goodrick-Clarke have discussed the connections between esoteric Nazism and Vril energy, the hidden Shambhala and Agartha civilizations, and underground UFO bases, as well as Hitler's and the SS's supposed survival in underground Antarctic bases in New Swabia, or in alliance with Hyperboreans from the subterranean world.

== Relationship to neopaganism ==
Esoteric neo-Nazism has been compared to neopaganism, which is also sometimes utilized by far-right activists. Esoteric Nazism intertwines its mystical and esoteric beliefs with a fascist and far-right political agenda.

== In popular culture ==
Writing in 2002, Goodrick-Clarke described a contemporary loose network of small musical groups that combine neo-fascism and Satanism. These groups can be found in Britain, France, and New Zealand, under names such as "Black Order" or "Infernal Alliance", and draw their inspiration from the Esoteric Hitlerism of Miguel Serrano.

Esoteric themes, including references to artifacts such as the Holy Lance, are also often alluded to in neo-Nazi music (e.g. Rock Against Communism) and above all in National Socialist black metal.

== See also ==
- Far-right subcultures
- Fascism and ideology
- Fascist mysticism
