= Magic: History, Theory, Practice =

1923 book by Ernst Schertel

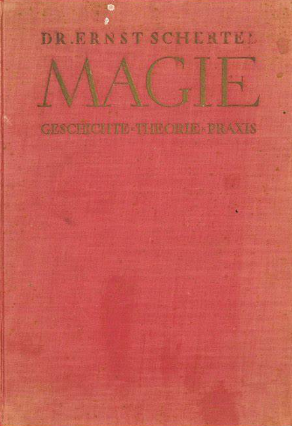
- Author: Dr. Ernst Schertel
- Original title: Magie: Geschichte, Theorie, Praxis
- Language: German
- Subject: Magic
- Publisher: Anthropos-Verlag
- Publication date: 1923
- Publication place: Germany
- English publication date: 2009
- Pages: 154

Magic: History, Theory, Practice is a mysticism book by Ernst Schertel. Originally published in Germany in 1923, Magic: History / Theory / Practice (in its original German edition), was a hardcover book consisting of 154 pages.

Schertel identifies heavily with the "demonic" in Magic, espousing the belief that "communion with the demon" is the most important aspect of magical/religious practice. In addition to this, Schertel also identified the following elements of magic:

1. Ecstasy. The performer must enter an altered mind state of "ecstasy", "possession" or "somnambulism", and it is usually achieved by dancing, chanting, hypnosis, intoxication, and even sacrifices. He wrote in the book, "Originally, prophecy meant just "speaking while being delighted with god," and this already shows that for this kind of magic the amalgamation with the demon, that is to say an ecstasy (trance) was seen as a precondition as much as with every other kind of magic." Some modern authors believe that it is equivalent to the alpha state of mind.
2. Imagination. It is the way through which the performer bring the desired changes into reality. Schertel wrote, "The man with the greatest force of imagination is commanding of the world and creates realities according to his will, instead of being the slave of an unsubstantial, bodiless empiricism." He believes that magic is autogenic exertion of power on the basis of imagination, and reality is nothing more than the becoming-an-image of our deepest essential powers, and thus the observation of truth is not a process of "depiction" but of "construction".
3. Body-feeling. The performer is required to develop a kind of "body feeling" through "body exercises". However, here Schertel is not referring to common muscle-building or physical training nowadays. The two forms of exercises that he recommends are "sensual" and "articular". "The sensual practices stand for a passive listening-into the body and are therefore preferably happening out of a state of relaxation, the articular practices on the other hand represent a violent, almost mechanical pushing and bending of individual joints or of the whole body... These practices are supported by certain breathing methods." He also points out that to increase body feeling, many magicians often perform with loose clothes or even naked.

In 2003, it was revealed that Schertel had sent a dedicated copy of the book to Adolf Hitler. Hitler read the book and marked several passages. A total of sixty-six annotations were made by Hitler in his copy. Eventually, Hitler's copy was obtained from the John Hay Library at Brown University and the book was translated into English with his annotations added.

The annotations were in the form of vertical lines drawn in the page margins to highlight certain passages.

Some of the passages marked by Hitler include:

- "False images are necessary for the recognition of truth."
- "All fight for power is therefore a fight of hostile structures."
- "The whole materialism and rationalism of our time virtually strikes in the face every deeper sense of reality and facts."
- "Satan is the beginning, Seraph is the end."
