= Mattias Gardell =

Swedish religious historian (born 1959)

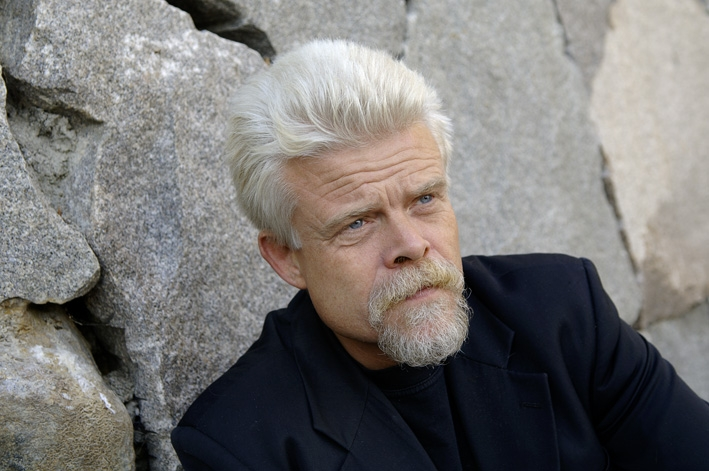
- Gardell in 2010
- Born: Hans Bertil Mattias Gardell; 10 August 1959 (age 66); Solna, Sweden

Academic background
- Education: PhD (Stockholm University)
- Thesis: Countdown to Armageddon: Minister Farrakhan and the Nation of Islam in the Latter Days (1995)

Academic work
- Discipline: Historian

Hans Bertil Mattias Gardell (born 10 August 1959) is a Swedish historian and scholar of comparative religion. In March 2006 he was appointed of the Nathan Söderblom Chair of Comparative Religion at Uppsala University, Sweden. He received the Lenin Award in 2009.

== Early life and education ==
Gardell was born on 10 August 1959 in Solna, Sweden. He dropped out of high school and lived many years later as a researcher among black and white racist representatives in the United States. He earned a PhD in the history of religions at Stockholm University in 1995. His 1995 dissertation on Louis Farrakhan and the Nation of Islam was published in both British and American editions.

== Career ==
Gardell specialized in the study of religious extremism and religious racism in the United States, studying groups such as the Ku Klux Klan, the Nation of Islam, and folkish movements in Neopaganism (Odinism).

From 2004 to 2006 he lived in Cairo, Egypt, studying the rise of political Islam. In March 2006, he returned to Sweden and was appointed the first holder (from 1 July 2006) of the Nathan Söderblom Chair of Comparative Religion at Uppsala University. He received the Lenin Award in 2009.

In 2010, Gardell was one of eleven Swedish activists from Ship to Gaza participating in the flotilla that tried to break the Israeli blockade of the Gaza Strip. Along with his wife, Edda Manga, Gardell was aboard MV Mavi Marmara during the Israeli armed forces' raid on the flotilla on the morning of 31 May 2010. He was deported from Israel and landed in Sweden on 3 June 2010 along with Manga and other Swedish participants. He told Swedish journalists "We were victims of a massive military assault ... It can not be described as anything but piracy." He also stated that the soldiers came on board with fully loaded weapons equipped with laser sights and at least four people were killed execution style.

In 2012, he testified as an expert witness on Islamophobia in the trial of Anders Behring Breivik In 2018, he co-authored the "Sweden"-section of the European Islamophobia Report 2017 published by the Erdogan controlled think-tank SETA. In a 2015 interview Gardell stated that individuals who commit acts of Islamic terrorism for Al-Qaeda and the Islamic State have "no previous contacts with Islam" and "have no connections to any mosque" but instead have radicalized online.

== Personal life ==
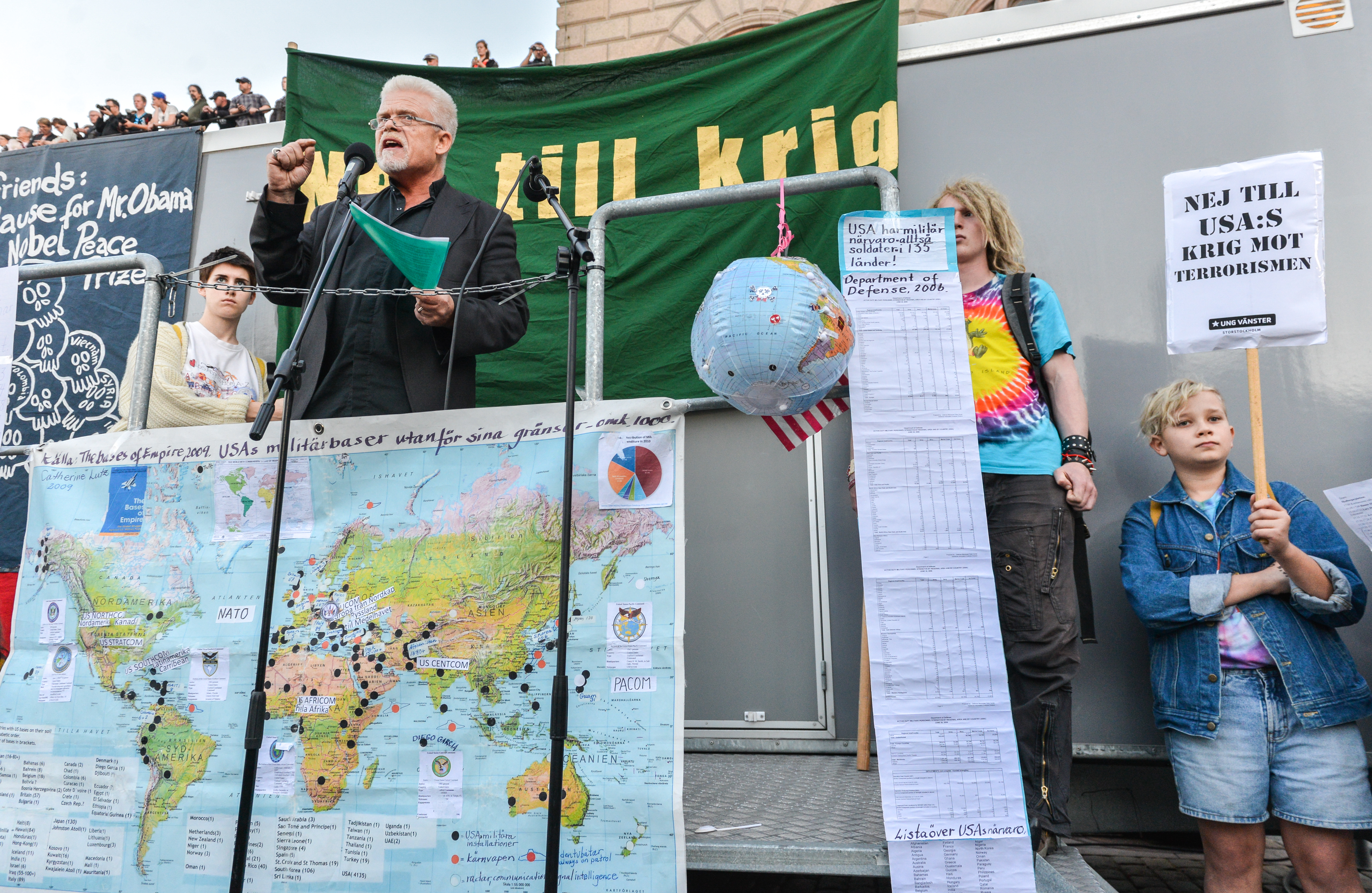
Gardell in September 2013, in Stockholm, speaking during a protest against Barack Obama's visit to Sweden

As of 2006, Gardell had nine children, six of his own and three "bonus children".

As of 2023, he is married to Edda Manga.

He has said that he feels an attachment to Asatru and has practiced it "in waves", but as of 2007 did not practice it actively. In 2007 he considered himself pagan and has called himself a "spiritual anarchist". Gardell is a libertarian socialist and a known human rights defender.

== Awards ==
- Lenin Award 2009

== Bibliography ==
- Countdown to Armageddon: Minister Farrakhan and the Nation of Islam in the Latter Days. Stockholm: Stockholm University. 1995. ISBN 91-7153-370-2. (dissertation)
- In the Name of Elijah Muhammad: Louis Farrakhan and the Nation of Islam. Durham: Duke University Press. 1996. ISBN 0-8223-1852-0.
- Rasrisk: rasister, separatister och amerikanska kulturkonflikter (in Swedish). Stockholm: Federativ. 1998. ISBN 91-86474-22-7.
- Gods of the Blood: The Pagan Revival and White Separatism. Durham: Duke University Press. 2003. ISBN 0-8223-3059-8.
- Bin Ladin i våra hjärtan: globaliseringen och framväxten av politisk islam (in Swedish). Stockholm: Leopard. 2005. ISBN 91-7343-024-2.
- Tortyrens återkomst (in Swedish). Stockholm: Leopard. 2008. ISBN 978-91-7343-171-2.
- Islamofobi (in Swedish). Stockholm: Leopard. 2010. ISBN 978-91-7343-288-7.
- Raskrigaren: Seriemördaren Peter Mangs (in Swedish). Leopard förlag. 2015. ISBN 9789173433815.
- Gardell, Mattias (2021). Lone Wolf Race Warriors and White Genocide. Cambridge University Press. doi:10.1017/9781108609760. ISBN 978-1108711135.
