= Theistic Satanism =

The inverted pentagram is a widespread symbol of Satanism.

Theistic Satanism, otherwise referred to as spiritual Satanism, or devil worship, is one of two manifestations of Satanism, in contrast to nontheistic Satanism. It is an umbrella term for religious groups that consider Satan to objectively exist as a deity, supernatural entity, or spiritual being worthy of worship or reverence, whom individuals may believe in, contact, and convene with, in contrast to the atheistic archetype, metaphor, or symbol found in LaVeyan Satanism.

Organizations who uphold theistic Satanist beliefs most often have few adherents, are loosely affiliated or constitute themselves as independent groups, which have largely self-marginalized. Another prominent characteristic of theistic Satanism is the use of various types of magic. Most theistic Satanist groups exist in relatively new models and ideologies, many of which are independent of the Abrahamic religions.

In addition to the worship of Satan or the Devil in the Abrahamic sense, religious traditions based on the worship of other "adversarial" gods—usually borrowed from pre-Christian polytheistic religions—are often included within theistic Satanism. Theistic Satanist organizations may incorporate beliefs and practices borrowed from Gnosticism, Hermeticism, neopaganism, New Age, the left-hand path, black magic, ceremonial magic, Western esotericism, and occultism.

== Satan ==
Satan is an entity in Abrahamic religions who entices humans into sin or falsehood. He is usually depicted as the embodiment of evil. In Judaism, Satan is seen as an agent subservient to God, typically regarded as a metaphor for the yetzer hara, or 'evil inclination'. In Christianity and Islam, he is usually seen as a fallen angel or jinn who has rebelled against God, who nevertheless allows him temporary power over the fallen world and a host of demons.

=== Devil in Christianity ===
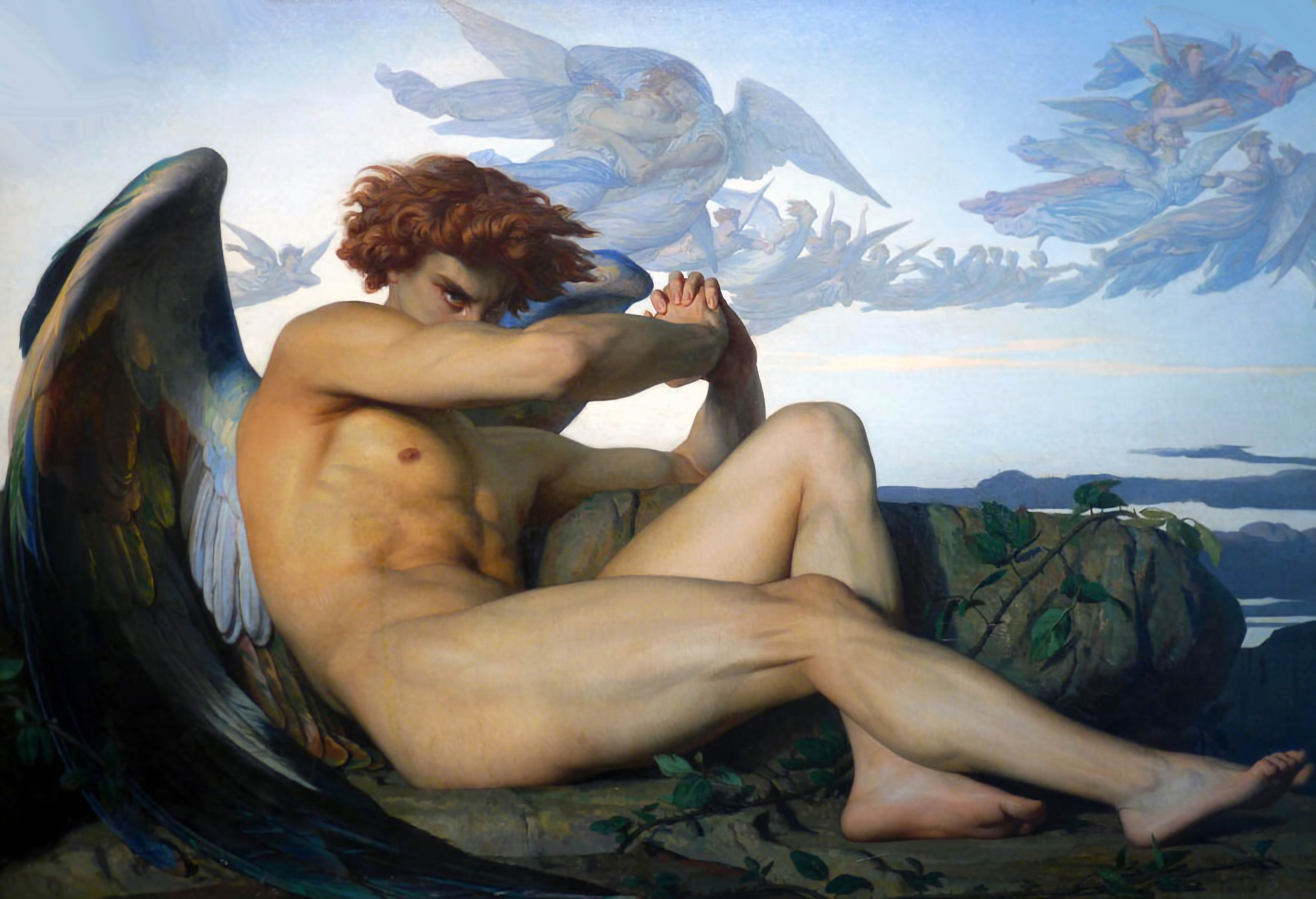
The Fallen Angel (1847) by Alexandre Cabanel

A large percentage of theistic Satanists worship Satan conceived as the Devil in the Christian religion. In Christianity, the Devil, also known as Satan or Lucifer, is the personification of evil and author of sin, who rebelled against God in an attempt to become equal to God himself. (Note: "By desiring to be equal to God in his arrogance, Lucifer abolishes the difference between God and the angels created by Him and thus calls the entire system of order into question (if he were instead to replace God, the system itself would only be preserved with reversed positions)".) He is depicted as a fallen angel, who was expelled from Heaven at the beginning of time, before God created the material world, and is in constant opposition to God.

The Devil is described and depicted as being perfect in beauty. He was so enamored with his own beauty and self, that he became vain, and so prideful that he corrupted himself and began to desire the same honor and glory that belonged to God. Eventually he rebelled and tried to overthrow God, and as a result was cast out of heaven. Satan is also portrayed as a father to his daughter, Sin, by the 17th-century English poet John Milton in Paradise Lost.

== Overview of theistic Satanism ==
Since the first half of the 1990s, the Internet has increased the interaction, visibility, communication, and spread of different currents and beliefs among self-identified Satanists and has led to the propagation of more conflicting and diverse groups, but Satanism has always been a heterogeneous, pluralistic, decentralized religious movement and "cultic milieu". Religion academics, scholars of New religious movements, and sociologists of religion focused on Satanism have sought to study it by categorizing its currents according to whether they are esoteric/theistic or rationalist/atheistic, and they referred to the practice of working with a literal Satan as theistic or "traditional" Satanism. It is generally a prerequisite to being considered a theistic Satanist that the believer accepts a theological and metaphysical canon which involves one or more gods that are either considered to be Satan in the strictest, Abrahamic sense (the Christian-Islamic conception of the Devil), or a conception of Satan that incorporates "adversarial" gods usually borrowed from pre-Christian polytheistic religions, such as Ahriman or Enki. Despite the number of self-professed theistic Satanists constantly increasing since the 1990s, they are considered by most scholars of religion to be a minority group within Satanism.

Many theistic Satanists believe that their own individualized concepts are based on pieces of all of these diverse conceptions of Satan, according to their inclinations and sources of spiritual guidance, rather than only believing in one suggested interpretation. Some may choose to live out the myths and stereotypes, but Christianity is not always the primary frame of reference for theistic Satanists. Their religion may be based on Gnosticism, Hermeticism, Neo-Paganism, New Age, the left-hand path, black magic, ceremonial magic, Crowleyan magick, Western esotericism, and occultism. Theistic Satanists who base their faith on Christian ideas about Satan are referred to as "Diabolists", although they are also referred to as "reverse Christians" by other Satanists, often in a pejorative fashion. However, those labelled by some as "reverse Christians" may see their concept of Satan as undiluted or unsanitized. They worship a stricter interpretation of Satan: that of the Satan featured in the Christian Bible. Peter H. Gilmore, current leader of the atheistic Church of Satan, considers "Devil-worship" to be a Christian heresy, that is, a divergent form of Christianity. The diversity of individual beliefs within theistic Satanism, while being a cause for intense debates within the religion, is also often seen as a reflection of Satan, who is believed to encourage individualism.

== Recent and contemporary theistic Satanism ==
=== Currents ===
The diversity of beliefs amongst Satanists, both theistic and non-theistic, was examined in a demographic survey conducted in 2001 by the American religion scholar and sociologist of religion James R. Lewis and subsequently published in the Marburg Journal of Religion. According to the survey, the statistically average demographic and ideological profile of a Satanist is an unmarried White male raised as a Christian who began to explore other religions during his teenage years, upholds non-theistic humanism and practices magic. A 2016 survey found that most self-identified Satanists were located in Denmark, Norway, and the United States.

==== Pre-LaVey ====
Ruben van Luijk writes "there are a few well-documented cases of Satanist organizations that antedate or are contemporary with LaVey's", and which may qualify as examples of theistic Satanism.

Citing research by Per Faxneld, van Luijk writes there were "two possible cases" in Europe of "isolated religious Satanism, both dating from the very end of the nineteenth and the threshold of the twentieth century". One example was a small group led by Polish writer Stanisław Przybyszewski (1868–1927), who, "Faxneld argues [...] developed a more or less coherent philosophy or spirituality in which Satan played a major symbolic role, amounting to 'what is likely the first attempt ever to construct a more or less systematic Satanism.'" The other example was the Danish writer Carl William Hansen (1872–1936), also known as Ben Kadosh. In the census of 1906, Hansen "declared himself a Luciferian by religion, making himself without doubt the first officially registered Satanist in history". That same year Hansen published a short booklet titled "Den ny morgens gry: erdensbygmesterens genkomst" (in English: "The Dawn of a New Morning: The Return of the World’s Master Builder"), of which van Luijk writes: "in which he announced the establishment of a cult of Satan/Lucifer and proposed the formation of a Masonic Luciferian organization."

There were, according to van Luijk, several other organizations might be considered examples of theistic Satanism from the early to mid-20th Century. The Fraternitas Saturni, founded in 1926 and led by Eugen Grosche (1888–1964), referenced both Lucifer and Satan in their rites. Another group was the Order of the Knights of the Golden Arrow, founded in Paris in 1930 by Maria de Naglowska. She declared herself a "Priestess of Satan” and spoke of the “Truth of the Wholesome Satanic Doctrine" and according to van Luijk her group can "arguably be considered the first known organized body of religious Satanism." However, van Luijk also notes "Satanism was only one component of her religious system, which could probably best be described as an intricate semi-Hegelian compound of Christian, occultist, and Satanist elements". Aleister Crowley also explored Satanic themes in his own system and was an influence on many later occultists, but "cannot be called a Satanist himself" given the relatively small place Satan played in Crowley's overall concept.

Apart from these earlier cases the first recognized esoteric, non-LaVeyan Satanist organization was the small group Our Lady of Endor Coven, which claimed to have been founded in 1948 by Herbert Arthur Sloane and therefore to allegedly precede the foundation of Anton LaVey's Church of Satan. However, definitive proof the Coven's existence does not exist before 1966; van Luijk allows the group probably existed before that year but likely not before 1953. Their doctrine relied on a Gnostic conception of Satan as the liberating serpent and bestower of knowledge to humankind opposed to the malevolent demiurge or creator god, mainly inspired by the Gnostic dualistic cosmology of the Ophites, Hans Jonas' study on the history of Gnosticism, and the writings of Margaret Murray on the witch-cult hypothesis. "Our Lady of Endor Coven" seems to have been the only existing coven of this Satanist organization, which was disbanded shortly after the death of its founder during the 1980s.

Additionally, van Luijk argues the Process Church of the Final Judgement (founded in 1965) might classify as theistic Satanism, but "it is not altogether clear when precisely Satan and Lucifer made their appearance in Process theology" before the concepts were promoted openly in 1967; the concepts might have been influenced by LeVey or developed independently.

==== First Church of Satan ====
The First Church of Satan (FCoS), a splinter group that separated from LaVey's Church of Satan during the 1970s, attempts to rediscover the teachings of Aleister Crowley and believe that Anton LaVey actually was a magus in the early days of the Church of Satan but gradually renounced his powers, became isolated and embittered. Furthermore, the First Church of Satan strongly criticizes the current Church of Satan as a pale shadow of its former self, and they strive to "maintain a Satanic organization that is not hostile or manipulative toward its own members".

==== Turku Society for the Spiritual Sciences ====
Pekka Siitoin founded the theistic Satanist group called the Turku Society for the Spiritual Sciences (Turun Hengentieteen Seura) on September 1, 1971. The society stated its founding principles as "promot[ing] nationalist patriotic activity [and] development of Aryan spirituality". The society also stated opposition to capitalism, communism and "the Jewish religion based on Jehovah's tyranny." Siitoin believed in neo-Gnosticism and Theosophy and combined these with antisemitism and satanism. To him, Lucifer, Satan and Jesus were subordinate to the Monad, and could be worshiped together. According to Siitoin, Moses invented magic, but jealous Demiurge-Jehova seeks to obscure its knowledge from the gentiles. Lucifer was a Promethean figure who created the original humanity and granted them wisdom so that they would evolve to be equal to Gods in time, while Jehova created the Jewish race to usurp Lucifer's power and lord over humanity. Siitoin was also influenced by Christian apocrypha, like Gospel of Judas and to him Jesus was an agent of the Monad and Lucifer against the Demiurge. These are combined with elements of Finnish folk magic. The society allegedly performed satanic orgies which researcher of religion Vesa Iitti opined might not be "far off from the truth". Several of the perpetrators of the Kursiivi printing house arson in November 1977 were members of the society.

==== Order of Nine Angles ====
Flag of the O9A

The Order of Nine Angles, claiming to have been established in the 1960s, rose to public recognition in the early 1980. This movement expressed the idea that groups like Church of Satan were "too benevolent and law-abiding" to be true Satanists. This notion grew, particularly among musicians and fans of extreme heavy metal music, where being more extreme meant being more authentic. These antinomian and amoral Satanic (or post-Satanic) groups are sometimes called the "sinister tradition" of Satanism.

The O9A describe their occultism as "Traditional Satanism". The O9A's writings not only encourage human sacrifice, but insist it is required in Satanism, referring to their victims as opfers. According to the Order's teachings, such opfers must demonstrate character faults that mark them out as being worthy of death. No O9A cell has admitted to carrying out a sacrifice in a ritualized manner, but rather, Order members have joined the police and military to carry out such killings.

==== Temple of Set ====
The Temple of Set is an occult left-hand path religious organization. It was founded in 1975 when Michael Aquino, the founder of a Church of Satan Grotto in Louisville, Kentucky, and editor of the Church's newsletter, The Cloven Hoof, left the church, taking 28 members with him. Aquino's anger that LaVey had devalued his high level grade of "magister" in the church may have initiated his break, but Aquino also disagreed with LaVey's materialist philosophy, arguing that while the church might publicly be materialist, Satan as symbol was "only part of the truth". Aquino held a ritual to ask Satan "where to lead" his CoS defectors and, on the night of 21–22 June 1975, Satan allegedly told him to "Reconsecrate my Temple and my Order in the true name of Set. No longer will I accept the bastard title of a Hebrew fiend." Thus Aquino came to believe that the name Satan was a corruption of the name Set, the Egyptian god of darkness. The philosophy of the Temple of Set may be summed up as "enlightened individualism"—enhancement and improvement of oneself by personal education, experiment, and initiation. This process is necessarily different and distinctive for each individual. The members do not agree on whether Set is real or symbolic, and they're not expected to.

==== Temple of the Black Light ====
The Temple of the Black Light, formerly known as the Misanthropic Luciferian Order, is a Satanic occult order founded in Sweden in 1995. The group espouses a philosophy known as "Chaosophy". Chaosophy asserts that the world that mankind lives in, and the universe that it lives in, all exist within the realm known as Cosmos. Cosmos is made of three spatial dimensions and one linear time dimension. Cosmos rarely ever changes and is a materialistic realm. Another realm that exists is known as Chaos. Chaos exists outside of the Cosmos and is made of infinite dimensions and unlike the Cosmos, it is always changing. Members of the TotBL believe that the realm of Chaos is ruled over by 11 dark gods, the highest of them being Satan, and all of said gods are considered manifestations of a higher being. This higher being is known as Azerate, the Dragon Mother, and is all of the 11 gods united as one. The TotBL believes that Azerate will resurrect one day and destroy the Cosmos and let Chaos consume everything. The group has been connected to the Swedish black/death metal band Dissection, particularly its front man Jon Nödtveidt. Nödtveidt was introduced to the group "at an early stage". The lyrics on the band's third album, Reinkaos, are all about beliefs of the Temple of the Black Light. Nödtveidt committed suicide in 2006.

==== Joy of Satan Ministries ====
Joy of Satan Ministries is a western esoteric occult organization that combines Satanism, the ancient alien theory, and antisemitism. It was originally founded in the early 2000s by Maxine Dietrich (pseudonym of Andrea Maxine Dietrich), wife of the National Socialist Movement of the United States' co-founder and former leader Clifford Herrington. With its inception, spiritual Satanism was born—a current that until recently was regarded only as "theist", but then defined into "Spiritual Satanism" by theistic Satanists who concluded that the term spiritual in Satanism represented the best answer to the world, considering it a "moral slap" toward the earlier carnal and materialistic LaVeyan Satanism, and instead focusing its attention upon spiritual evolution. Joy of Satan Ministries presents a unique synthesis of theistic Satanism, Nazism, Gnosticism, neopaganism, Western esotericism, UFO conspiracy theories, and extraterrestrial hypotheses similar to those popularized by Zecharia Sitchin and David Icke.

==== Church of Ahriman ====
The Church of Ahriman (also known as the Dakhma of Angra Mainyu), founded in 2012, is a theistic Satanist organization led by Adam Daniels. Its worship includes celebrations of a Black Mass that involve desecration of consecrated hosts that are used in Christian celebrations of Holy Communion. The Church of Ahriman performs rituals that involve the desecration of Christian statuary of the Virgin Mary using menstrual blood (which they refer to as "The Consumption of Mary"), as well as desecration of religious texts such as the Qur'an. The Dakhma of Angra Mainyu performs Satanic exorcisms, an inversion of Christian exorcisms.

==== Other groups and currents ====
Some groups are mistaken by scholars for theistic Satanists, such as the First Church of Satan. However, the founder of the FCoS, John Allee, considers what he calls "Devil-worship" to often be a symptom of psychosis. Other groups such as the 600 Club, are accepting of all types of Satanists, as are the Synagogue of Satan, which aims for the ultimate destruction of all religions, paradoxically including itself, and encourages not self-indulgence but self-expression balanced by social responsibility.

=== Luciferianism ===
The sigil of Lucifer

Luciferians reportedly revere Lucifer not as the devil, but as a destroyer, guardian, liberator, light bringer, and/or guiding spirit to darkness, or even as the true god, as opposed to Jehovah.

=== Values in theistic Satanism ===
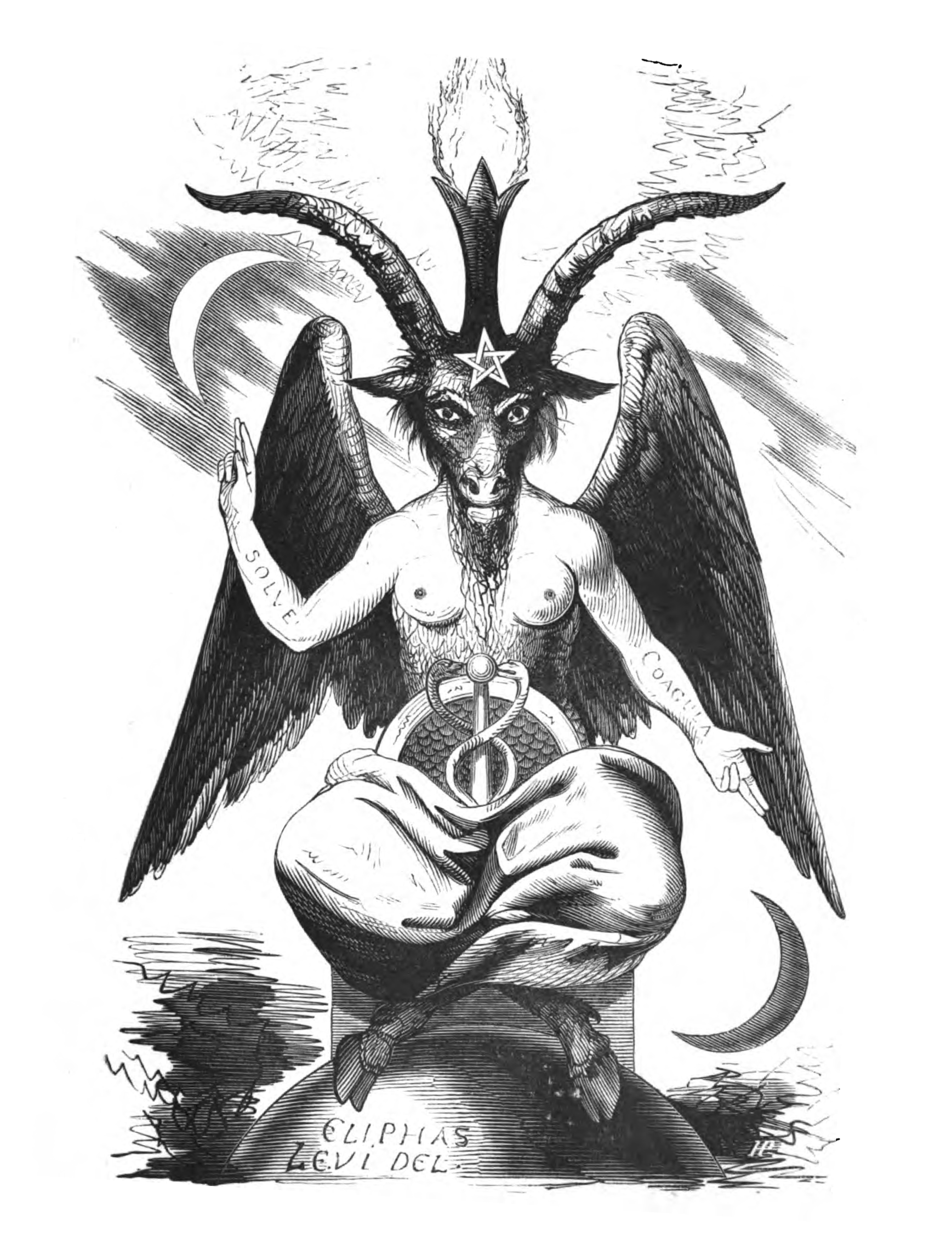
Éliphas Lévi's 19th-century drawing of the Baphomet (also known as the "Sabbatic Goat" or the Goat of Mendes), adopted symbol of some left-hand-path systems, including some theistic Satanist groups.

Seeking knowledge is seen by some theistic Satanists as being important to Satan, due to Satan being equated with the serpent in Genesis, which encouraged humans to partake of the fruit of the tree of the knowledge of good and evil. Some perceive Satan as Éliphas Lévi's conception of Baphomet – a half-human and half-animal hermaphroditic bestower of knowledge (gnosis). Some Satanic groups, such as Luciferians, also seek to gain greater gnosis. Some of such Satanists, such as the former Our Lady of Endor Coven, equate Yahweh with the demiurge of Gnosticism, and Satan with the transcendent being beyond.

Self-development is important to theistic Satanists. This is due to the Satanists' idea of Satan, who is seen to encourage individuality and freedom of thought, and the quest to raise one's self up despite resistance, through means such as magic and initiative. They believe Satan wants a more equal relationship with his followers than the Abrahamic God does with his. From a theistic Satanist perspective, the Abrahamic religions (chiefly Christianity) do not define "good" or "evil" in terms of benefit or harm to humanity, but rather on the submission to or rebellion against God. Some Satanists seek to remove any means by which they are controlled or repressed by others and forced to follow the herd, and reject non-governmental authoritarianism.

As Satan in the Old Testament tests people, theistic Satanists may believe that Satan sends them tests in life to develop them as individuals. They value taking responsibility for oneself. Despite the emphasis on self-development, some theistic Satanists believe that there is a will of Satan for the world and for their own lives. They may promise to help bring about the will of Satan, and seek to gain insight about it through prayer, study, or magic. In the Bible, a being called "the god of this world" is mentioned in the Second Epistle to the Corinthians 4:4, which Christians typically equate with Satan. Some Satanists therefore think that Satan can help them meet their worldly needs and desires if they pray or work magic. They would also have to do what they could in everyday life to achieve their goals, however.

Theistic Satanists may try not to project an image that reflects negatively on their religion as a whole and reinforces stereotypes, such as promoting Nazism, abuse, or crime. However, some groups, such as the Order of Nine Angles, criticize the emphasis on promoting a good image for Satanism; the ONA described LaVeyan Satanism as "weak, deluded and American form of 'sham-Satanic groups, the poseurs'", and ONA member Stephen Brown claimed that "the Temple of Set seems intent only on creating a 'good public impression', with promoting an 'image'". The order emphasises that its way "is and is meant to be dangerous" and "[g]enuine Satanists are dangerous people to know; associating with them is a risk". Similarly, the Temple of the Black Light has criticized the Church of Satan, and has stated that the Temple of Set is "trying to make Setianism and the ruler of darkness, Set, into something accepted and harmless, this way attempting to become a 'big' religion, accepted and acknowledged by the rest of the Judaeo-Christian society". The TotBL rejects Judaism, Christianity, and Islam as "the opposite of everything that strengthens the spirit, and is only good for killing what little that is beautiful, noble, and honorable in this filthy world".

There is argument among Satanists over animal sacrifice, with most groups seeing it as both unnecessary and putting Satanism in a bad light, and distancing themselves from the few groups that practice it, such as the Temple of the Black Light.

Theistic Satanism often involves a religious commitment, rather than being simply an occult practice based on dabbling or transient enjoyment of the rituals and magic involved. Practitioners may choose to perform a self-dedication rite, although there are arguments over whether it is best to do this at the beginning of their time as a theistic Satanist, or once they have been practicing for some time.

== Historical mentions of theistic Satanism ==
=== The age of accusations ===
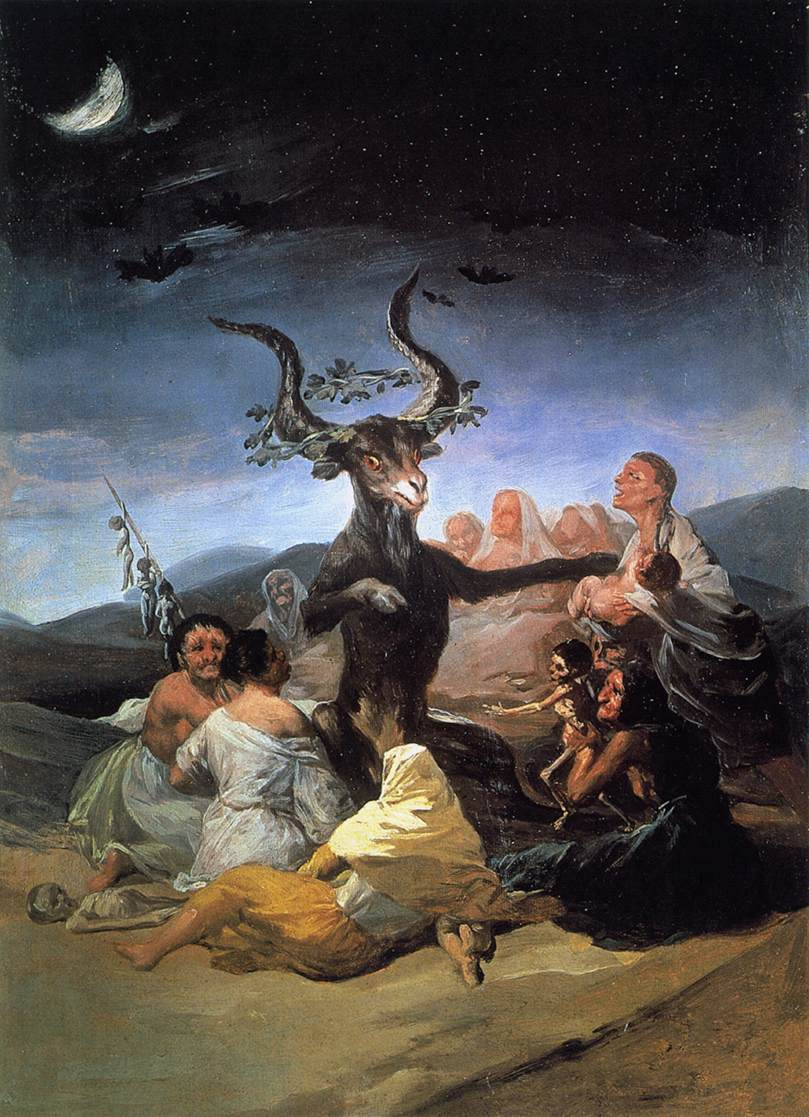
Francisco de Goya's Witches' Sabbath (1789), which depicts the Devil flanked by Satanic witches. The witch-cult hypothesis states that such stories are based upon a real-life pagan cult that revered a horned god.

In the history of Christianity, the worship of Satan was a frequent accusation used since the Middle Ages. The first ones formally accused of being Devil-worshippers were the Albigensians, a Gnostic Christian movement considered to be heretical and persecuted by the Roman Catholic Church; the charge was formulated during the Catholic Inquisition by the Fourth Lateran Council (1215), convoked by Pope Innocent III. The charge of Devil-worship has also been made against groups or individuals regarded with suspicion, such as the Knights Templar or minority religions. In the case of the trials of the Knights Templar (1307), the Templars' writings mentioned the term Baphomet, which was an Old French corruption of the name "Mahomet" (the prophet of the people who the Templars fought against), and that Baphomet was falsely portrayed as a demon by the people who accused the Templars. During the Reformation Era, Counter-Reformation, and European wars of religion, the charge of Devil-worship was used against people charged in the witch trials in early modern Europe and other witch-hunts. The most notorious cases were those of two German Inquisitors and Dominican priests under the patronage of Pope Innocent VIII: Heinrich Kramer and Jacob Sprenger, authors of the Malleus Maleficarum (1486), in the Holy Roman Empire, along with the Salem witch trials that occurred during the 17th-century Puritan colonization of North America.

It is not known to what extent accusations of groups worshiping Satan in the time of the witch trials identified people who did consider themselves Satanists, rather than being the result of religious superstition or mass hysteria, or charges made against individuals suffering from mental illness. Confessions are unreliable, particularly as they were usually obtained under torture. However, scholar Jeffrey Burton Russell, professor emeritus of the University of California at Santa Barbara, has made extensive arguments in his book Witchcraft in the Middle Ages that not all witch trial records can be dismissed and that there is in fact evidence linking witchcraft to Gnostic Christian heretical movements, particularly the antinomian sects. Russell comes to this conclusion after having studied the source documents themselves. Individuals involved in the Affair of the Poisons were accused of Satanism and witchcraft.

Historically, Satanist was a pejorative term for those with opinions that differed from predominant religious or moral beliefs. Paul Tuitean believes the idea of acts of "reverse Christianity" was created by the Inquisition, but George Bataille believes that inversions of Christian rituals such as the Mass may have existed prior to the descriptions of them which were obtained through the witchcraft trials.

=== Grimoire Satanism ===
The full sigil of Lucifer, as it originally appeared in the Grimorium Verum

In the 1700s, various kinds of popular "Satanic" literature began to be produced in France, including some well-known grimoires with instructions for making a pact with the Devil. Most notable are the Grimorium Verum and The Grand Grimoire. The Marquis de Sade describes defiling crucifixes and other holy objects, and in his novel Justine he gives a fictional account of the Black Mass, although Ronald Hayman has said Sade's need for blasphemy was an emotional reaction and rebellion from which Sade moved on, seeking to develop a more reasoned atheistic philosophy. Nineteenth century occultist Éliphas Lévi published his well-known drawing of the Baphomet in 1855, which notably continues to influence Satanists today.

Finally, in 1891, Joris-Karl Huysmans published his Satanic novel, Là-bas, which included a detailed description of a Black Mass which he may have known firsthand was being performed in Paris at the time, or the account may have been based on the masses carried out by Étienne Guibourg, rather than by Huysmans attending himself. Quotations from Huysmans' Black Mass are also used in some Satanic rituals to this day, since it is one of the few sources that purports to describe the words used in a Black Mass. The type of Satanism described in Là-bas suggests that prayers are said to the Devil, hosts are stolen from the Catholic Church, and sexual acts are combined with Roman Catholic altar objects and rituals, to produce a variety of Satanism which exalts Satan and degrades the god of Christianity by inverting Roman Catholic rites. George Bataille claims that Huysman's description of the Black Mass is "indisputably authentic". Not all theistic Satanists today routinely perform the Black Mass, possibly because the Mass is not a part of modern evangelical Christianity in Protestant-majority countries, and so not such an unintentional influence on Satanist practices in those countries.

=== Organized Satanism ===
The earliest verifiable theistic Satanist group was a small group called the Our Lady of Endor Coven, which was created in Ohio in 1948. Our Lady of Endor Coven was inspired by the ancient Ophite sect of Gnosticism, and the Horned God of Wicca. The group was dependent upon its founder and leader, and therefore dissolved after his death in 1975.

Michael Aquino published a rare 1970 text of a Church of Satan Black Mass, the Missa Solemnis, in his book The Church of Satan, and Anton LaVey included a different Church of Satan Black Mass, the Messe Noire, in his 1972 book The Satanic Rituals. LaVey's books on Satanism, which began in the 1960s, were for a long time the few available which advertised themselves as being Satanic, although others detailed the history of witchcraft and Satanism, such as The Black Arts by Richard Cavendish published in 1967 and the classic French work Satanism and Witchcraft, by Jules Michelet. Anton LaVey specifically denounced "devil-worshippers" and the idea of praying to Satan.

Although non-theistic LaVeyan Satanism had been popular since the publication of The Satanic Bible in 1969, theistic Satanism did not start to gain any popularity until the emergence of the Order of Nine Angles in western England, and its publication of The Black Book of Satan in 1984. The next notable theistic Satanist group to be created was the Misanthropic Luciferian Order, which was created in Sweden in 1995. The MLO incorporated elements from the Order of Nine Angles, the Illuminates of Thanateros, and qlippothic Qabalah.

== Symbolism ==
A goat head and inverted pentagram form the sigil of Baphomet.

Since the 19th century, various small religious groups have emerged that identify as Satanists or use Satanic iconography. The Satanist groups that appeared after the 1960s are widely diverse, but two major trends are nontheistic Satanism and theistic Satanism. Theistic Satanists venerate Satan as worthy of worship, viewing him not as omnipotent but rather as a patriarch. In contrast, atheistic Satanists regard Satan as a symbol of certain human traits.

Baphomet, a deity allegedly worshipped by the Knights Templar, frequently appears in Satanic symbolism, with usage based on claims that Freemasonry worshipped both Satan and Baphomet, as well as Lucifer, in their rituals. Both Satan and Baphomet are often depicted or symbolized as a goat, therefore the goat and goat's head are significant symbols throughout Satanism. The inverted pentagram is also a significant symbol used for Satanism, sometimes depicted with the goat's head of Baphomet within it, popularized by the Church of Satan. In most recent and modern times the "inverted cross" is used and seen as an anti-Christian and satanic symbol, used similarly in the way of the inverted pentagram.

== Personal theistic Satanism ==
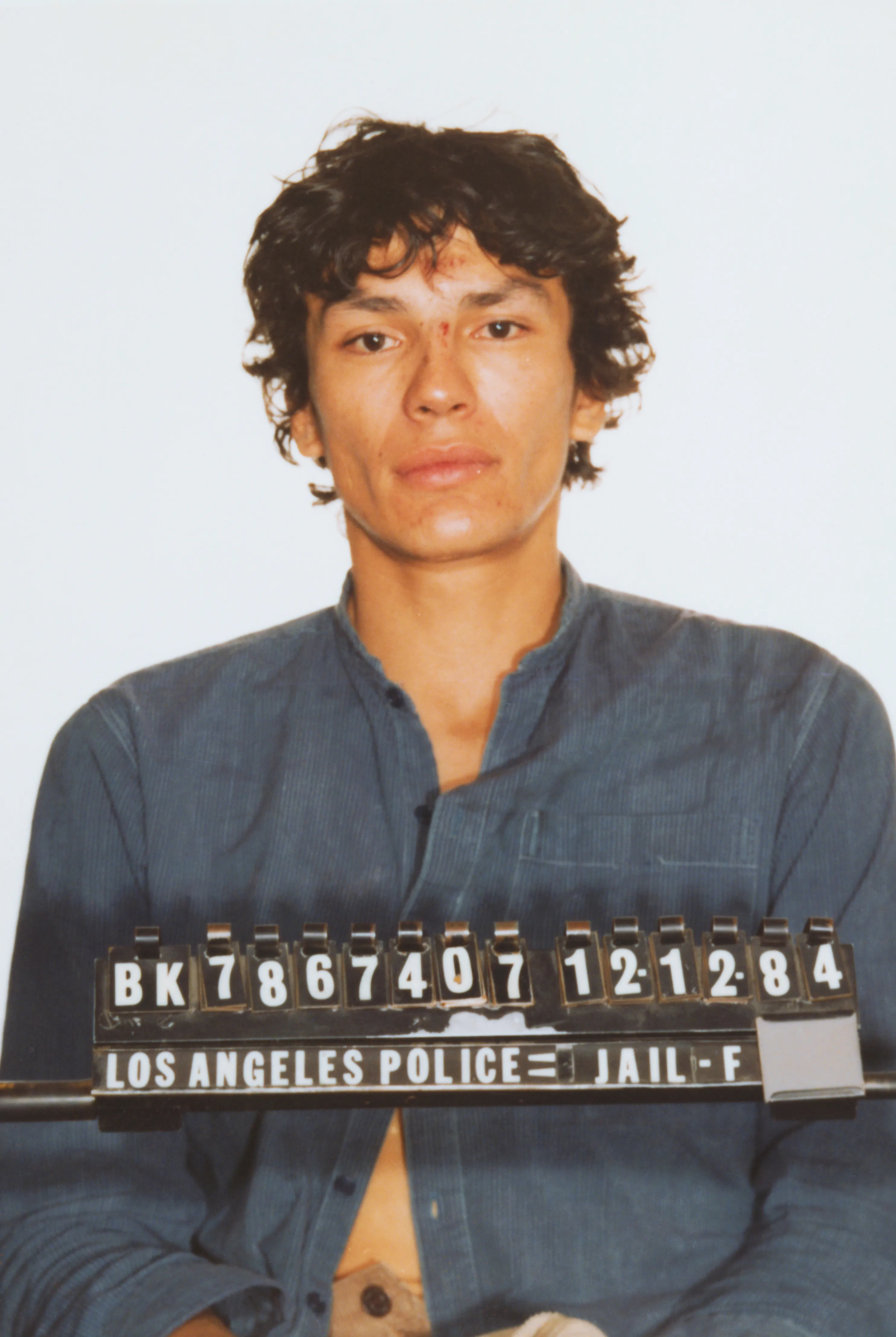
The American serial killer Richard Ramirez self-identified as a theistic Satanist.

The American serial killer Richard Ramirez claimed that he was a theistic Satanist; during his 1980s killing spree he left an inverted pentagram at the scene of each murder and at his trial called out "Hail Satan!" Ramirez made various references to Satan during his legal proceedings; he notably drew a pentagram on his palm at his trial. Ramirez stated during his death row interview he believed in a "malevolent being" and that Satan's "description eludes" him. Ramirez also enjoyed frequently degrading and humiliating his victims, especially those who survived his attacks or whom he explicitly decided not to kill, by forcing them to profess that they loved Satan, or telling them to "swear on Satan" if there were no more valuables left in their homes he had broken into and burglarized.

== Modern-day public image of theistic Satanism and moral panics ==
As a moral panic between the 1980s and the 1990s in the United States and Canada, there were multiple allegations of sexual abuse and/or ritual sacrifice of children or non-consenting adults in the context of Satanic rituals in what has come to be known as the Satanic Panic.

Allegations included the existence of a worldwide Satanic conspiracy formed by large networks of organized Satanists involved in criminal activities such as murder, child pornography, sexual exploitation of children, and human trafficking for prostitution. In the United States, the Kern County child abuse cases, McMartin preschool trial, and the West Memphis cases were widely reported. One case took place in Jordan, Minnesota, in which children made allegations of the manufacture of child pornography, ritualistic animal sacrifice, coprophagia, urophagia, and infanticide, at which point the Federal Bureau of Investigation (FBI) was alerted. Twenty-four adults were arrested and charged with acts of sexual abuse, child pornography, and other crimes claimed to be related to Satanic ritual abuse; three went to trial, two were acquitted, and one was convicted. Supreme Court Justice Scalia noted in a discussion of the case that "[t]here is no doubt that some sexual abuse took place in Jordan; but there is no reason to believe it was as widespread as charged", and cited the repeated, coercive techniques used by the investigators as damaging to the investigation.

These notorious cases were launched after children were repeatedly and coercively interrogated by social workers, resulting in false allegations of child sexual abuse. No evidence was ever found to support any of the allegations of an organized Satanist conspiracy or Satanic ritual abuses, but in some cases the Satanic Panic resulted in wrongful prosecutions. However, the National Center on Child Abuse and Neglect conducted a study led by University of California psychologist Gail Goodman did find "convincing evidence of lone perpetrators or couples who say they are involved with Satan or use the claim to intimidate victims." One such case Goodman studied involved "grandparents [who] had black robes, candles, and Christ on an inverted crucifix--and the children had chlamydia, a sexually transmitted disease, in their throats", according to the report by a district attorney.

In 2025, members of the sextortion network 764, described in some medias as a 'Satanist group' were arrested for "blackmailing children—mainly girls—into carrying out sexual acts, harming themselves or even attempting suicide." An investigation by the BBC found that members of this group "seek out vulnerable young girls on social media, often in communities dedicated to self-harm or mental health."

== See also ==
- Angelolatry
- Azazel
- Contemporary Religious Satanism
- Deal with the Devil
- Demonology
- Discordianism
- Dystheism
- Dualistic cosmology
- LaVeyan Satanism
- Luciferianism
- Misotheism
- Problem of evil
- Problem of Hell
- Satanic panic
- Taxil hoax

== Bibliography ==
- ——— ——— (2014). Contemporary Esotericism. London: Routledge. ISBN 978-1-317-54357-2.
- Baddeley, Gavin (2010) [1999]. Lucifer Rising: Sin, Devil Worship & Rock 'n' Roll (3rd ed.). London: Plexus Publishing. ISBN 978-0-85965-455-5.
- Dyrendal, Asbjørn (2016). "Satanism in Norway". In Bogdan, Henrik; Hammer, Olav (eds.). Western Esotericism in Scandinavia. Brill Esotericism Reference Library. Leiden and Boston: Brill Publishers. pp. 481–488. doi:10.1163/9789004325968_062. ISBN 978-90-04-30241-9. ISSN 2468-3566.
- Dyrendal, Asbjørn; Lewis, James R.; Petersen, Jesper Aagaard, eds. (2016). The Invention of Satanism. New York City: Oxford University Press. ISBN 978-0-19-518110-4. LCCN 2015013150.
- Faxneld, Per. "Post-Satanism, Left-Hand Paths, and Beyond: Visiting the Margins". In Faxneld & Petersen (2013), pp. 205–208.
- Faxneld, Per; Petersen, Jesper Aagaard, eds. (2013). The Devil's Party: Satanism in Modernity. New York City: Oxford University Press. ISBN 978-0-19-977923-9.
- ——— ; Petersen, Jesper Aagaard (2013a). "Introduction: At the Devil's Crossroads". In Faxneld & Petersen (2013), pp. 3–18.
- ——— . "Secret Lineages and De Facto Satanists: Anton LaVey's Use of Esoteric Tradition". In Asprem & Granholm (2014), pp. 72–90.
- Gallagher, Eugene V. (2004). "New Foundations". The New Religious Movements Experience in America. Westport, Connecticut: Greenwood Press. pp. 187–196. ISBN 0-313-32807-2.
- Gardell, Mattias (2003). Gods of the Blood: The Pagan Revival and White Separatism. Durham and London: Duke University Press. ISBN 978-0-8223-3071-4.
- Geisenhanslüke, Achim; Mein, Georg; Overthun, Rasmus (2015) [2009]. Geisenhanslüke, Achim; Mein, Georg (eds.). Monströse Ordnungen: Zur Typologie und Ästhetik des Anormalen [Monstrous Orders: On the Typology and Aesthetics of the Abnormal]. Literalität und Liminalität (in German). Vol. 12. Bielefeld: Transcript Verlag. doi:10.1515/9783839412572. ISBN 978-3-8394-1257-2.
- Goetz, Hans-Werner (2016). Gott und die Welt. Religiöse Vorstellungen des frühen und hohen Mittelalters. Teil I, Band 3: IV. Die Geschöpfe: Engel, Teufel, Menschen [God and the world. Religious Concepts of the Early and High Middle Ages. Part I, Volume 3: IV. The Creatures: Angels, Devils, Humans] (in German). Vandenhoeck & Ruprecht. ISBN 978-3-8470-0581-0.
- Goodrick-Clarke, Nicholas (2003). Black Sun: Aryan Cults, Esoteric Nazism, and the Politics of Identity. New York: New York University Press. ISBN 978-0-8147-3155-0.
- Granholm, Kennet. "Embracing Others than Satan: The Multiple Princes of Darkness in the Left-Hand Path Milieu". In Petersen (2009), pp. 85–101.
- ——— . "The Left-Hand Path and Post-Satanism: The Temple of Set and the Evolution of Satanism". In Faxneld & Petersen (2013), pp. 209–228.
- Harvey, Graham (1995). "Satanism in Britain Today". Journal of Contemporary Religion. 10 (3). Routledge: 283–296. doi:10.1080/13537909508580747.
- ——— . "Satanism: Performing Alterity and Othering". In Petersen (2009), pp. 27–40.
- Holt, Cimminnee; Petersen, Jesper Aagaard (2016) [2008]. "Modern Religious Satanism: A Negotiation of Tensions". In Lewis, James R.; Tøllefsen, Inga (eds.). The Oxford Handbook of New Religious Movements, Volume 2 (2nd ed.). New York City: Oxford University Press. pp. 441–452. doi:10.1093/oxfordhb/9780190466176.013.33. ISBN 978-0-19-046617-6.
- Introvigne, Massimo (2016). Satanism: A Social History. Aries Book Series: Texts and Studies in Western Esotericism. Vol. 21. Leiden and Boston: Brill Publishers. ISBN 978-90-04-28828-7. OCLC 1030572947.
- Kaplan, Jeffrey (2000). "Order of Nine Angles". Encyclopedia of White Power: A Sourcebook on the Radical Racist Right. Jeffrey Kaplan (editor). Walnut Creek, California: AltaMira Press. pp. 235–238. ISBN 978-0-7425-0340-3.
- Klaits, Joseph (1985). Servants of Satan: The Age of the Witch Hunts. Bloomington, Indiana: Indiana University Press. ISBN 0-253-20422-4. JSTOR j.ctt16xwc16.
- La Fontaine, Jean (1999). "Satanism and Satanic Mythology". In Bengt Ankarloo; Stuart Clark (eds.). Witchcraft and Magic in Europe. Vol. 6: The Twentieth Century. London: Athlone. pp. 81–140. ISBN 0-485-89006-2.
- Laycock, Joseph P. (2023). Satanism. Elements in New Religious Movements (online ed.). Cambridge University Press. ISBN 9781009057349.
- Lewis, James R. (2001a). Satanism Today: An Encyclopedia of Religion, Folklore, and Popular Culture. Santa Barbara, California: ABC-CLIO. ISBN 978-1-57607-292-9.
- ——— Petersen, Jesper Aagaard, eds. (2005). Controversial New Religions. Oxford: Oxford University Press. ISBN 978-0-19-515683-6.
- Mathews, Chris (2009). Modern Satanism: Anatomy of a Radical Subculture. Westport, Connecticut: Praeger Publishers. ISBN 978-0-313-36639-0.
- Monette, Connell (2013). Mysticism in the 21st Century. Wilsonville, Oregon: Sirius Academic Press. ISBN 978-1-940964-00-3.
- Moynihan, Michael; Søderlind, Didrik (2003) [1998]. Lords of Chaos: The Bloody Rise of the Satanic Metal Underground (Revised and expanded ed.). Port Townsend, Washington: Feral House. ISBN 0-922915-94-6.
- Partridge, Christopher (2004). The Re-Enchantment of the West: Alternative Spiritualities, Sacralization, Popular Culture, and Occulture. Vol. 1. London: T&T Clark. ISBN 0-567-08269-5.
- Petersen, Jesper Aagaard (2004). "Modern Satanism: Dark Doctrines and Black Flames". In Lewis, James R.; Petersen, Jesper Aagaard (eds.). Controversial New Religions (1st ed.). New York: Oxford University Press. doi:10.1093/019515682X.003.0019. ISBN 978-0-19-515682-9.
- Petersen, Jesper Aagaard. "Modern Satanism: Dark Doctrines and Black Flames". In Lewis & Petersen (2005), pp. 423–458.
- ——— , ed. (2009). Contemporary Religious Satanism: A Critical Anthology. Farnham: Ashgate Publishing. ISBN 978-0-7546-5286-1.
- Petersen, Jesper Aagaard (2014). "From Book to Bit: Enacting Satanism Online". In Asprem, Egil; Granholm, Kennet (eds.). Contemporary Esotericism. Abingdon, Oxfordshire: Routledge. pp. 134–158. ISBN 978-1-908049-32-2.
- Petersen, Jesper Aagaard, ed. (2016) [2009]. Contemporary Religious Satanism: A Critical Anthology. Abingdon, Oxfordshire: Routledge. ISBN 978-0-7546-5286-1.
- Russell, Jeffrey Burton (1972). Witchcraft in the Middle Ages. Ithaca, New York: Cornell University Press. ISBN 0-8014-0697-8. JSTOR 10.7591/j.ctvv416z0.
- Ryan, Nick (2003). Homeland: Into a World of Hate. Edinburgh and London: Mainstream Publishing. ISBN 978-1-84018-465-5.
- Schipper, Bernd U. (2010). "From Milton to Modern Satanism: The History of the Devil and the Dynamics between Religion and Literature". Journal of Religion in Europe. 3 (1): 103–124. doi:10.1163/187489210X12597396698744.
- Sieg, George (2013). "Angular Momentum: From Traditional to Progressive Satanism in the Order of Nine Angles". International Journal for the Study of New Religions. 4 (2): 251–283. doi:10.1558/ijsnr.v4i2.251.
- Senholt, Jacob C. "Secret Identities in the Sinister Tradition: Political Esotericism and the Convergence of Radical Islam, Satanism, and National Socialism in the Order of Nine Angles". In Faxneld & Petersen (2013), pp. 250–274.
- van Luijk, Ruben (2016). Children of Lucifer: The Origins of Modern Religious Satanism. Oxford Studies in Western Esotericism. New York City: Oxford University Press. ISBN 978-0-19-027512-9.
