= Atheistic Satanism =

Non-theistic religion

The inverted pentagram is a widespread symbol of Satanism.

Atheistic Satanism, also known as modern Satanism, philosophical Satanism, secular Satanism, rationalistic Satanism, or non-theistic Satanism, is one of the two main forms of Satanism and the counterpart to theistic Satanism. It is an umbrella term for non-theistic religions that consider Satan to be an archetype, metaphor, or symbol (often representing a resistance to religious dominance) rather than a deity, supernatural entity, or spiritual being. It was established in 1966 with the founding of LaVeyan Satanism. Atheistic Satanism often places emphasis on individuation, personal growth and human potential. Typical beliefs of atheistic Satanism include self-responsibility, rational thinking, and rejection of religious guilt. It is the most common form of Satanism. It is a left-hand path religion.

== Overview ==
Atheistic Satanism is commonly divided into two main forms which are the Satanism of LaVeyan Satanism and The Satanic Temple.

=== LaVeyan Satanism ===
The Sigil of Baphomet: emblem of the Church of Satan

Atheistic Satanism first began with the founding of LaVeyan Satanism and its church, the Church of Satan, in San Francisco, California on April 30, 1966 by the late Anton LaVey. The religion does not believe Satan to be a deity nor an existing figure but instead a symbol of characteristics of human nature such as pride. Some beliefs include that humans are animals, egoism, Social Darwinism, and anti-egalitarianism. Rituals are a form of psychodrama and includes the practice of psychological based magic which is divided into lesser magic and greater magic. Lesser magic is manipulation carried out by applied psychology while greater magic are rituals meant to focus individual energy. Holidays celebrated are Walpurgis Night, Yule, Halloween, birthdays, equinoxes, and solstices. The foundational text is The Satanic Bible which was written in 1969 by LaVey. LaVey's daughter, Karla LaVey, founded her own church dedicated to LaVeyan Satanism on October 31, 1999 called the First Satanic Church.

=== The Satanic Temple ===
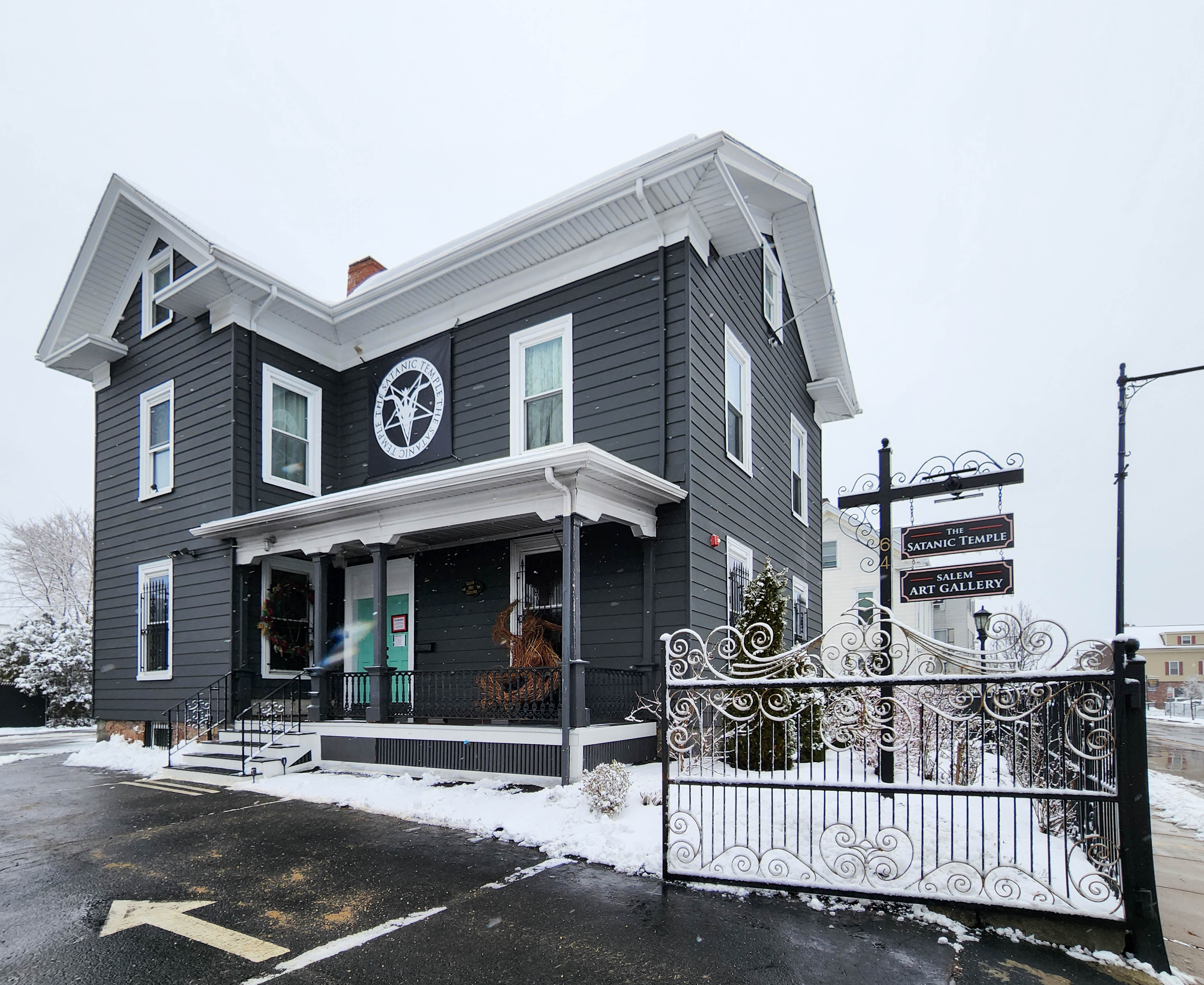
The headquarters of the Satanic Temple and Salem Art Gallery at Salem, Massachusetts

Inspired by LaVeyan Satanism, The Satanic Temple (TST) was founded by Lucien Greaves and Malcolm Jerry in 2012 and is located in Salem, Massachusetts. The temple promotes the separation of church and state, abortion rights, LGBTQ rights, bodily integrity, secularism, and egalitarianism. It is based on seven tenets, which are:

1. One should strive to act with compassion and empathy toward all creatures in accordance with reason.
2. The struggle for justice is an ongoing and necessary pursuit that should prevail over laws and institutions.
3. One's body is inviolable, subject to one's own will alone.
4. The freedoms of others should be respected, including the freedom to offend. To willfully and unjustly encroach upon the freedoms of another is to forgo one's own.
5. Beliefs should conform to one's best scientific understanding of the world. One should take care never to distort scientific facts to fit one's beliefs.
6. People are fallible. If one makes a mistake, one should do one's best to rectify it and resolve any harm that might have been caused.
7. Every tenet is a guiding principle designed to inspire nobility in action and thought. The spirit of compassion, wisdom, and justice should always prevail over the written or spoken word.

Some followers of the Satanic Temple consider the form of Satanism practiced by the Satanic Temple to be "Seven-Tenet Satanism," due to the religion's basis on the seven tenets, or "Compassionate Satanism." Holidays celebrated are Sol Invictus, Halloween, Lupercalia, Hexenacht, and Unveiling Day. It achieved recognition as a religion by the US government in 2019 and received tax-exempt status.

== Comparison to theistic Satanism ==
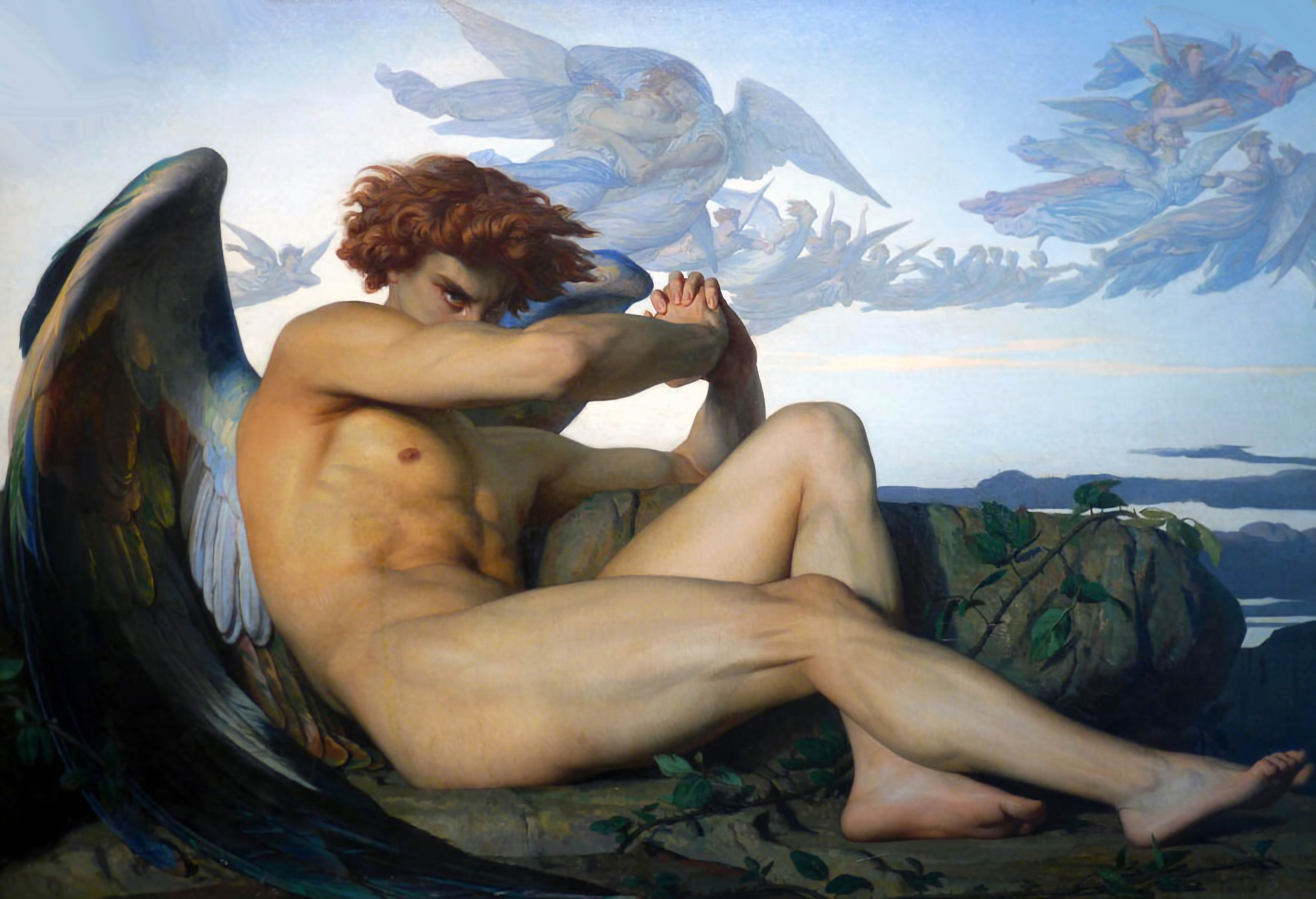
Alexandre Cabanel - The Fallen Angel (1847)

Aside from the belief differences of Satan, theistic Satanism differs from atheistic Satanism in other distinct ways. The most significant difference is the inclusion of the supernatural and prevalence. Atheistic Satanists commonly view rituals and magic as non-supernatural while theistic Satanists may view rituals as a literal interaction with supernatural forces and may view magic as a supernatural power. An example of a theistic Satanist organization is the Temple of Set which broke away from the Church of Satan in 1975 due to differences of belief.
