= Contemporary Religious Satanism =

2009 academic anthology

Contemporary Religious Satanism: A Critical Anthology
- Cover
- Editor: Jesper Aagaard Petersen
- Language: English
- Series: Controversial New Religions
- Subjects: Religious studies Satanism studies
- Publisher: Ashgate
- Publication date: 2009
- Publication place: United States
- Media type: Print (Hardcover)
- Pages: 277
- ISBN: 978-0-7546-5286-1
- OCLC: 226978969
- LC Class: BL480 .P39 2009

Contemporary Religious Satanism: A Critical Anthology is an academic anthology published by Ashgate in 2009 and edited by the Norwegian religious scholar Jesper Aagaard Petersen, then a lecturer at the Norwegian University of Science and Technology.

The book is divided into three sections, containing eight separate papers produced by various scholars working in the field of Satanism studies; Contemporary Religious Satanism examines different forms of Satanism as practiced in Europe and North America. It was a part of Ashgate's series of books on "Controversial New Religions" alongside tomes devoted to the academic study of new religious movements, such as Wicca and the Order of the Solar Temple.

Academic reviews were mixed, being printed in peer-reviewed academic journals such as Nova Religio, Aries, and Magic, Ritual, and Witchcraft. It was recognised as a pioneering publication in the field of Satanism studies.

== Publication ==
The volume was published in 2009 as part of Ashgate's Controversial New Religions series. Its editor, Jesper Aagaard Petersen, has a background in religious studies.

== Reception ==
The volume was reviewed by the British anthropologist Jean La Fontaine for the Nova Religio journal, and by the Swedish historian of religion Per Faxneld of Stockholm University for the Aries journal. Erik Davis of Rice University reviewed the anthology for the Magic, Ritual, and Witchcraft journal, noting that the book was primarily sociological in basis but that it opened up "an underresearched and underreported topic". Describing Petersen's "thorough introduction", he then discusses the various papers within the anthology. He opines that Lowney had "beautifully" described her encounters, but that it was "unfortunate" that she spent so much of the text reflecting on her logistical challenges, subsequently describing Søderlind and Dyrendal's contribution as "one of the most lively and entertaining" parts of the volume. He remarks positively of Granholm's criticism of the term "Satanism", describing his chapter as a "crucial contribution", and believing that he has made a "good case" for the term "left-hand path".

The volume also dedicates an essay to the old-school Norwegian Black Metal scene, which according to Davis "shows how [...] aesthetics, ethos, and metaphysical worldview" are "fused into a paradigmatic (and sometimes violent) moment of satanic sincerity—one whose grim ascesis features, paradoxically, an almost total inversion of LaVey's call for hedonic enjoyment". Moving on to review the inclusion of primary documents at the end of the volume, he believes that the works presented appear "minor in context", and that it is unfortunate that texts from Anton LaVey and Michael Aquino were not included. As such, he believes that Contemporary Religious Satanism is not "the perfect reader."

Wishing that philosophical and symbolic analyses of Satanism had been included alongside the sociological studies, Davis also felt that "much more can be made" regarding the differences between LaVeyan-influenced secular Satanists and the mystical left-hand path followers. He believed that the volume would be of great interest to scholars of magic, contemporary Paganism, and new religious movements.
