= LaVeyan Satanism =

Religious movement founded by Anton LaVey

Sigil of Baphomet, the official symbol of LaVeyan Satanism

LaVeyan Satanism is the name given to the form of Satanism promoted by American occultist and author Anton LaVey (1930–1997). LaVey founded the Church of Satan (CoS) in 1966 in San Francisco. Although LaVey is thought to have had more influence with his Satanic aesthetics of "colourful" rites and "scandalous" clothes that created a "gigantic media circus", he also promoted his ideas in writings, such as the popular Satanic Bible. LaVeyan Satanism has been classified as a new religious movement and a form of Western esotericism by scholars of religion. LaVey's ideas have been said to weave together an array of sometimes "contradictory" "thinkers and tropes", combining "humanism, hedonism, aspects of pop psychology and the human potential movement", along with "a lot of showmanship". His ideas were heavily influenced by the ideas and writings of Friedrich Nietzsche, Ayn Rand and Arthur Desmond.

Contrary to the popular image of Satanism as the worship of an evil supernatural entity, LaVeyan adherents do not consider Satan to be a literal being or entity, but a positive archetype representing humanity's natural instincts of pride and carnality, and of defiance against Abrahamic religions which preach suppression of these urges. The church considers humans to be animals existing in an amoral universe, and promotes a philosophy based on individualism and egoism, coupled with social Darwinism and anti-egalitarianism. LaVey valued success, not "evil for its own sake".

Church doctrines are based on materialism and philosophical naturalism, rejecting the existence of the supernatural (including Satan and God), body-soul dualism, and life after death. However, LaVey also "hinted" at the possibility of paranormal forces, and believed magic could and should be used for material gain, personal influence, to harm enemies, and to gain success in love and sex. "Magic" in LaVeyan Satanism involves ritual practice meant as psychodramatic catharsis to focus one's emotional energy for a specific purpose (called "greater magic" and very much resembling psychotherapy); and also psychological manipulation using applied psychology and glamour (or "wile and guile") to bend another individual or a situation to one's will (called "lesser magic").

LaVey's followers in the Church of Satan maintain that he and the church "codified" Satanism, and while some Satanic splinter groups — such as John Dewey Allee's First Church of Satan and Karla LaVey's First Satanic Church — follow LaVey's ideas, others do not. The Temple of Set embraces "Theist" supernatural Satanism, while the large and active Satanic Temple, though atheist, rejects LaVey and Ayn Rand's ideas on hierarchy and self-centeredness in favor of a "left-wing", "socially engaged" Satanism, agitating for separation of church and state, reproductive rights, and transgender rights.

== Definition ==
LaVeyan Satanism – which is also sometimes termed "Modern Satanism" and "Rational Satanism" – is classified by scholars of religious studies as a new religious movement. When used, "Rational Satanism" is often employed to distinguish the approach of the LaVeyan Satanists from the "Esoteric Satanism" or "Theistic Satanism", embraced by groups like the Temple of Set, and Joy of Satan Ministries. A number of religious studies scholars have also described it as a form of "self-religion" or "self-spirituality", with religious studies scholar Amina Olander Lap arguing that it should be seen as being both part of the "prosperity wing" of the self-spirituality New Age movement and a form of the Human Potential Movement. Similarly, the scholar of Satanism Jesper Aa. Petersen calls modern Satanism a "cousin" of the New Age and Human Potential movements.

"In LaVey's way of thinking, Satanism is both a distinctly new religion, which he himself, without any false modesty, invented and the continuance of an ancient tradition of opposition to the status quo... For LaVey, Satanism is also the religion of the playful provocateur; anything that will shock people out of their unthinking adherence to the status quo is worth thinking about or even doing."

— Religious studies scholar Eugene Gallagher.

The anthropologist Jean La Fontaine described LaVeyan Satanism as having "both elitist and anarchist elements", also citing one occult bookshop owner who referred to the church's approach as "anarchistic hedonism". In their study of Satanism, the religious studies scholars Asbjørn Dyrendal, James R. Lewis, and Jesper Aa. Petersen suggested that LaVey viewed his religion as "an antinomian self-religion for productive misfits, with a cynically carnivalesque take on life, and no supernaturalism". The sociologist of religion James R. Lewis even described LaVeyan Satanism as "a blend of Epicureanism and Ayn Rand's philosophy, flavored with a pinch of ritual magic." The historian of religion Mattias Gardell described LaVey's as "a rational ideology of egoistic hedonism and self-preservation", while Nevill Drury characterised LaVeyan Satanism as "a religion of self-indulgence". It has also been described as an "institutionalism of Machiavellian self-interest".

The Church of Satan rejects the legitimacy of any other organizations who claim to be Satanists, dubbing them "Devil worshipers". Prominent Church leader Blanche Barton described Satanism as "an alignment, a lifestyle". LaVey and the church espoused the view that "Satanists are born, not made"; that they are outsiders by their nature, living as they see fit, who are self-realized in a religion which appeals to the would-be Satanist's nature, leading them to realize they are Satanists through finding a belief system that is in line with their own perspective and lifestyle.

== Importance and influence ==
From left to right: Karla LaVey, Diane Hegarty, and Anton LaVey ritualizing in the Black House, the original headquarters of the Church of Satan

Religious studies scholar R. Van Luijk writes, "Genealogically speaking, every known Satanist group or organization in the world today derives directly or indirectly from LaVey's 1966 Church of Satan, even if they are dismissive of LaVey or choose to emphasize other real or alleged forerunners of Satanism." The sociologist James R. Lewis noted that "LaVey was directly responsible for the genesis of Satanism as a serious religious (as opposed to a purely literary) movement", and the first organized church in modern times to be devoted to the figure of Satan. According to Egil Asprem and Kennet Granholm, scholars agree that there is no reliably documented case of Satanic continuity prior to the founding of the Church of Satan. For Faxneld and Petersen, the Church represented "the first public, highly visible, and long-lasting organization which propounded a coherent satanic discourse".

The church itself is dismissive of other Satanist groups as deviant or unimportant, insisting Satanism has been "codified" as "a religion and philosophy" by LaVey and the church. The Church of Satan rejects the legitimacy of any other organizations who claim to be Satanists, dubbing them reverse-Christians, pseudo-Satanists or Devil worshipers, atheistic or otherwise, and maintains a purist approach to Satanism as expounded by LaVey.

== Beliefs ==
=== Satan as symbol ===
Among LaVey's influences were the Romantic writers (such as William Blake, Lord Byron, Percy Bysshe Shelley, and William Hazlitt), who saw the Satan of John Milton's Paradise Lost as a flawed anti-hero, a rebel leader of charisma and bravery, defying God's tyranny, and not as the source of all evil, as he is thought of in traditional Christianity. The Romantic did not worship Satan but saw him as a positive symbol.

LaVey embraced the iconography of Satan and the label of "Satanist" because it shocked people into thinking, and its association with social nonconformity and rebellion against the dominant system. When asked about the name of his religion, he replied that "the reason it's called Satanism is because it's fun, it's accurate and it's productive".

LaVey saw Satan as a symbol of the individual's own vitality, thus representing an autonomous power within, and a representation of personal liberty and individualism. Throughout The Satanic Bible, the LaVeyan Satanist's view of god is described as the Satanist's true "self"—a projection of his or her own personality—not an external deity. In works like The Satanic Bible, LaVey often uses the terms "god" and "Satan" interchangeably, viewing both as personifications of human nature.

Despite his professed atheism, and his not encouraging the worship of Satan as a deity, some passages of LaVey's writings left room for a literal interpretation of Satan, and some members of his Church understood the Devil as an entity that really existed. It is possible that LaVey left some ambivalence in his writings so as not to drive away those Church members who were theistic Satanists. Both LaVey's writings and the publications of the church continue to refer to Satan as if he were a real being, in doing so seeking to reinforce the Satanist's self-interest.

=== Atheism and Satan ===
LaVey was an atheist who rejected the existence of all gods, of any afterlife, and of Satan as an entity who literally exists. The use of Satan as a central figure was intentionally symbolic. According to LaVey, it was not enough for satanists to merely be atheistic. LaVey sought to cement his belief system within the secularist world-view that derived from natural science, thus providing him with an atheistic basis with which to legitimized his religion, and criticize Christianity and other supernaturalist beliefs as irrational. He defined Satanism as "a secular philosophy of rationalism and self-preservation (natural law, animal state), giftwrapping these ideas in religious trappings to add to their appeal." In this way, LaVeyan Satanism has been described as an "antireligious religion" by Rubin van Luijk.

If man insists on externalizing his true self in the form of "God," then why fear his true self, in fearing "God,"—why praise his true self in praising "God,"—why remain externalized from "God" in order to engage in ritual and religious ceremony in his name?
Man needs ritual and dogma, but no law states that an externalized god is necessary in order to engage in ritual and ceremony performed in a god's name! Could it be that when he closes the gap between himself and his "God" he sees the demon of pride creeping forth—that very embodiment of Lucifer appearing in his midst?

— LaVey, The Satanic Bible.

=== Reverse Christianity ===
LaVey used Christianity as a negative mirror for his new faith, rejecting the basic principles and theology of Christian belief, which he also believed would soon disappear anyway. He perceived Christianity as a lie, exerting a negative force on humanity, by promoted idealism, self-sacrifice, altruism, community mindedness, self-denigration, herd behavior, and irrationality. Instead of (what it believed to be) these vices, LaVey encouraged materialism, egoism, carnality, atheism, social stratification and social Darwinism. LaVey's Satanism was particularly critical of what it understands as Christianity's emphasis on the spiritual and denial of humanity's animal nature, and instead calls for the celebration of, and indulgence in, animal desires.

Christianity was not the only negative force in the eyes of Laveyan Satanism. Other major religions, along with philosophies such as humanism and liberal democracy were also detrimental to human fulfillment.

=== Influences and political aspects ===
According to the Church's "Policy on Politics", the Church has no "'official' political position", and leaves politics to its individual members, each of whom have their own opinions of what (if any) political candidates or causes are worth supporting, usually based on "their own practical needs and desires". This may embrace one or more of all sorts of different ideologies, (it then lists every conceivable ideology including Communism and Socialism). As for the desire to 'change the world', this (it asserts) is an "emotional drive" that is a "common stage of early adult development" which adults outgrow, "typically beginning around age 16 and lasting until around age 24".

On the other hand, observers have characterized LaVeyan Satanism as belonging to the political right rather than the left. Historian of Satanism Ruben van Luijk describes it as a form of "anarchism of the Right". Randall Alfred describes LaVey's "stance" as "law-and-order, right-wing" and "patriotic". LaVey was influenced by the writings of Herbert Spencer (strongly associated with social Darwinism and the expression "the survival of the fittest"), Friedrich Nietzsche (who opposed emphasis on mercy, charity, and helping the weak as a 'slave's morality'), and Ayn Rand (whose overarching philosophical theme was that "unfettered self-interest is good and altruism is destructive").

LaVey believed in social Darwinism, and the fundamental inequality of human beings, and that an anti-egalitarian and elitist society was only natural. Social Darwinism is particularly noticeable in The Book of Satan, where LaVey uses portions of Redbeard's Might Is Right, and refers to man's inherent strength and instinct for self-preservation.

LaVey described his Satanism as "just Ayn Rand's philosophy with ceremony and ritual added". LaVey's "Nine Satanic Statements" (see below) are paraphrased from a speech by John Galt in Rand's novel Atlas Shrugged. (An essay on the church's website by "Nemo", a Magister in the Church of Satan, states "Satanism has far more in common" with Rand's philosophy of "Objectivism" "than with any other religion or philosophy. Objectivists endorse reason, selfishness, greed and atheism." However he finds some differences, such as Rand's hesitancy to accept either "the use of force to cause others to submit to the will of the stronger or cleverer individual", or the axiom of "personal needs as absolutely reliable to determine the best course of action in any circumstance". The atheism of Objectivism is also more pure, completely rejecting "the value of a god", while Satanists hold that "the meaning of god is useful" if it is defined as "the most important person in an individual's universe", which of course is the individual himself.) In the Satanic Bible, LaVey writes that the Satanist asks themselves: "'Why not really be honest and if you are going to create a god in your image, why not create that god as yourself'.... every man is a god if he chooses to recognize himself as one".

LaVey was strongly influenced by Nietzsche, according to religious studies scholar Asbjørn Dyrendal and Social Scientist Gabriel Andrade. Nietzsche celebrated the values of Dionysus – the Ancient Greek god of wine and excess – who also represented (at least for Nietzsche), uninhibited rage and hedonism, an opposite of "the moral restrictions of Christianity", according to Andrade. Nietzsche was also famous for the concepts of Übermensch (the naturally superior man interested in accomplishment in this life, not in the spiritual or afterlife) and "God is dead".

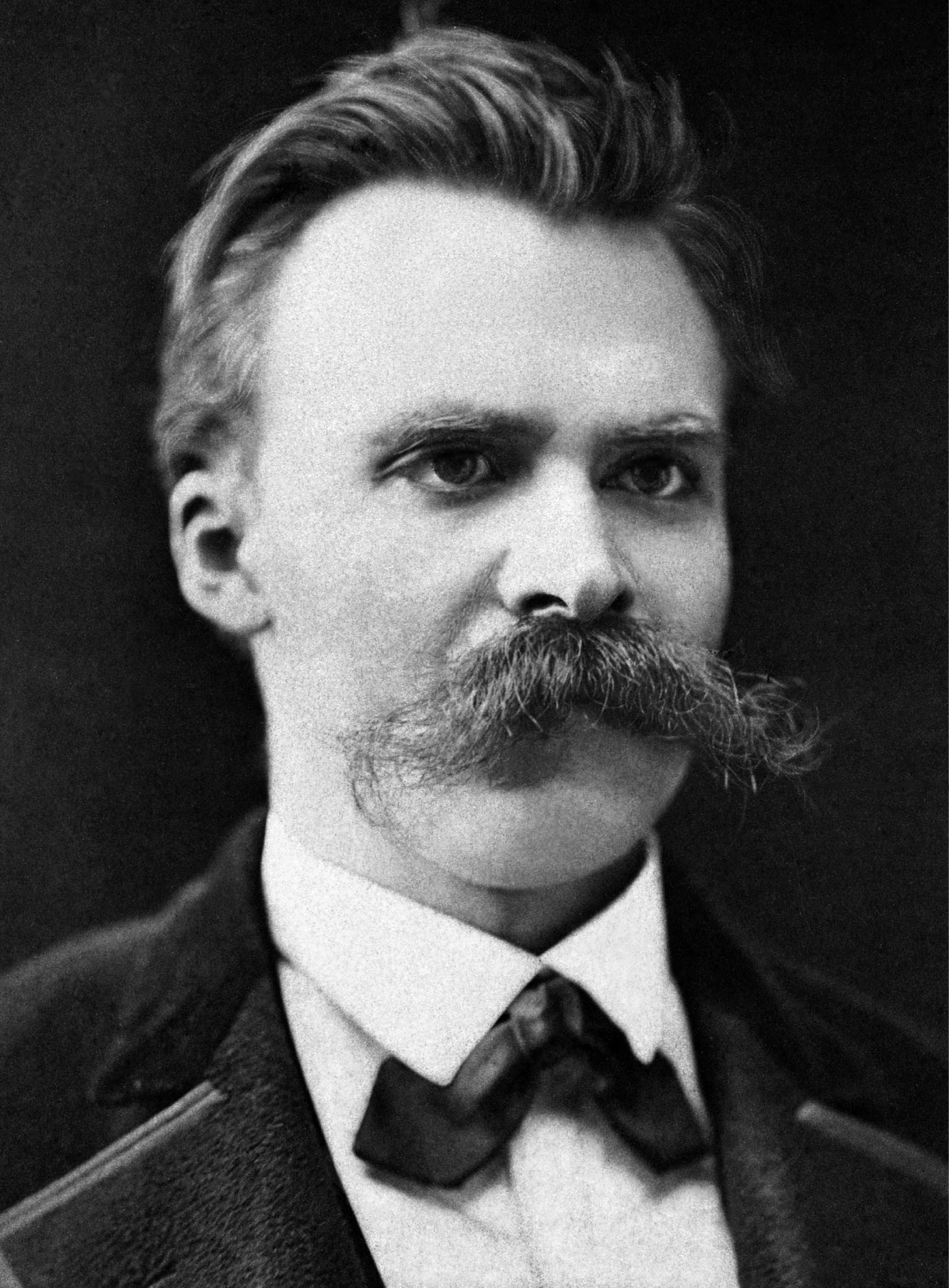
LaVeyan Satanism's views on human nature are influenced by the work of Friedrich Nietzsche

LaVey viewed the human being explicitly as an animal, existing in an amoral context of survival of the fittest, with no purpose other than survival. He believed that in adopting a philosophical belief in its own superiority above that of the other animals, humankind had become "the most vicious animal of all". For LaVey, non-human animals and children represent an ideal, "the purest form of carnal existence", because they have not been indoctrinated with Christian or other religious concepts of guilt and shame. His ethical views championed placing oneself and one's family before others, minding one's own business, and – for men – behaving like a "gentleman". In responding to threats and harm, he urged that "if a man smite thee on the one cheek, smash him on the other", reversing the Biblical Christian teaching and promoted the principle of lex talionis (an eye for an eye) derived from Ragnar Redbeard's book Might is Right.

=== Individualism ===
LaVeyan Satanism places great emphasis on the role of liberty and personal freedom. LaVey believed that the ideal Satanist should be individualistic and non-conformist, rejecting what he called the "colorless existence" that mainstream society sought to impose on those living within it. He rejected consumerism and what he called the "death cult" of fashion. He praised the human ego for encouraging an individual's pride, self-respect, and self-realization and accordingly believed in satisfying the ego's desires. He expressed the view that self-indulgence was a desirable trait, and that hate and aggression were not wrong or undesirable emotions but that they were necessary and advantageous for survival. Accordingly, he praised the Seven Deadly Sins (pride, greed, wrath, envy, lust, gluttony and sloth), as virtues which were beneficial for the individual. This individualism extended to the Church dismissing the idea of a "Satanic Community" and the sharing of membership lists with its members (at least under High Priest Peter H. Gilmore), (Note: In 1993, when LaVey still ran the Church, this was apparently not the case. An article by Diane E. Taub and Lawrence D. Nelson in The Sociological Quarterly stated that "... the Church of Satan has an official membership list that provides for communication and networking among members.") arguing that as "radical individualists", church members "may share very little in common beyond" beyond their Satanism.

Similarly, LaVey criticized the negative and restrictive attitude to sexuality present in many religions, instead supporting any sexual acts that take place between consenting adults. His Church welcomed homosexual members from its earliest years, and he also endorsed celibacy for those who were asexual. He sought to discourage negative feelings of guilt arising from sexual acts such as masturbation and fetishes, and believed that rejecting these sexual inhibitions and guilt would result in a happier and healthier society. Discussing women, LaVey argued that they should use sex as a tool to manipulate men, in order to advance their own personal power. Conversely, non-consensual sexual relations, such as rape and child molestation, were denounced by LaVey and his Church.

==== Vision of the future ====
LaVey believed that Christianity would soon wither away and society would enter an Age of Satan, in which a generation living in accordance with LaVeyan principles would come to power. LaVey supported eugenics and expected it to become a necessity in the future, when it would be used to breed an elite who reflected LaVey's "Satanic" principles. In his view, this elite would be "superior people" who displayed the "Satanic" qualities of creativity and nonconformity. He regarded these traits as capable of hereditary transmission, and made the claim that "Satanists are born, not made". He believed that the elite should be siphoned off from the rest of the human "herd", with the latter being forced into ghettoes, ideally "space ghettoes" located on other planets. The anthropologist Jean La Fontaine highlighted an article that appeared in a LaVeyan magazine, The Black Flame, in which one writer described "a true Satanic society" as one in which the population consists of "free-spirited, well-armed, fully-conscious, self-disciplined individuals, who will neither need nor tolerate any external entity 'protecting' them or telling them what they can and cannot do." This rebellious approach conflicts with LaVey's firm beliefs in observing the rule of law.

=== Magic ===
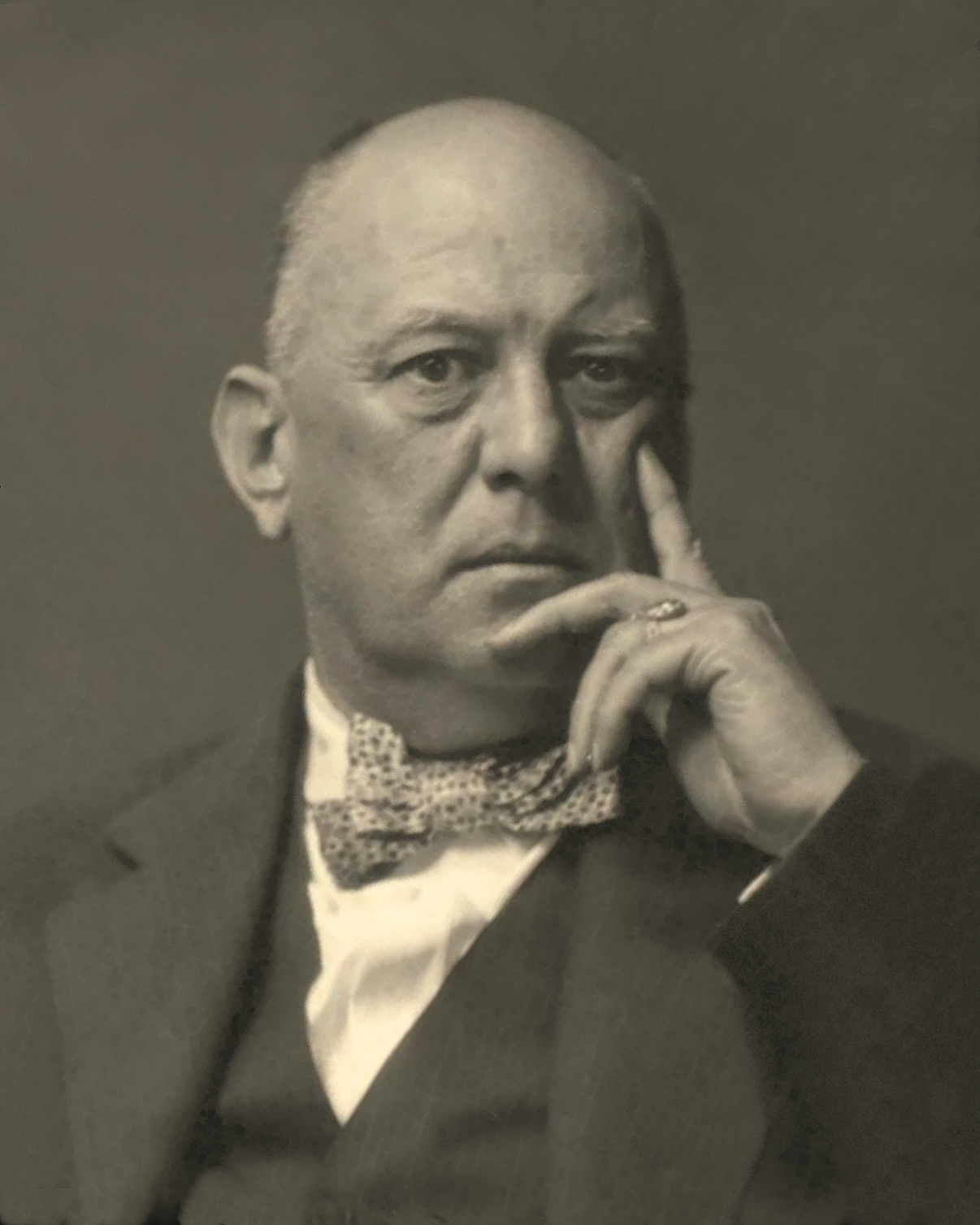
LaVey's understanding of magic was influenced by the British occultist Aleister Crowley

Although LaVey's ideas suggest a secular and scientific world-view, he also expressed a belief in magic. Rather than characterising magic as a supernatural phenomenon, LaVey portrayed it as part of the natural world but appearing magical because it had not been discovered and explained by scientists. Outlined in The Satanic Bible, LaVey defined magic as "the change in situations or events in accordance with one's will, which would, using normally accepted methods, be unchangeable", a definition that reflects the influence of the British occultist Aleister Crowley. Although he never explained exactly how he believed that this magical process worked, LaVey stated that magicians could successfully utilise this magical force through intensely imagining their desired goal and thus directing the force of their own willpower toward it. He emphasised the idea that magical forces could be manipulated through "purely emotional" rather than intellectual acts.

Challenging LaVey's insistence that the magic practiced in ceremonies in the church's "ritual chamber", was not supernatural but merely "supernormal", Lucien Greaves, spokesperson for The Satanic Temple, a rival of the Church of Satan, argues LaVey's beliefs about magic were "artfully, and probably intentionally, unclear in his writings".

LaVey's own descriptions of Magical Successes, from deadly hexes to unexplained healings, were as scientifically unjustified as any supernatural claims to magical influence. Even LaVey's nontheism is uncertain. Upon his death, his partner and biographer, Blanche Barton, insisted that LaVey did, in fact, "believe in the devil."

In a taped interview quoted by Taub and Nelson, LaVey explained that while they did not perform human blood sacrifices because the physical "destruction of a human being ... is illegal", they did perform human sacrifices of enemies "by proxy, you might say", using "curses and hexes".

Joseph P. Laycock writes that LaVey described magic as "a way of life", but was "ambiguous" about whether it was a "shorthand for popular psychology", or whether there was some supernatural element in it.

This practice puts LaVeyan Satanism within a wider tradition of 'high magic' or ceremonial magic, and has also been compared with Christian Science and Scientology. LaVey adopted beliefs and ideas from older magicians but consciously de-Christianised and Satanised them for his own purposes. In presenting himself as applying a scientific perspective on magic, LaVey was likely influenced by Crowley, who had also presented his approach to magic in the same way. However, in contrast to many older ceremonial magicians, LaVey denied that there was any division between black magic and white magic, attributing this dichotomy purely to the "smug hypocrisy and self-deceit" of those who called themselves "white magicians". He also differed from many older magicians who described magic as a means to bring about personal transformation and transcendence; for LaVey the goal of magic was instead material gain, personal influence, to harm enemies, and to gain success in love and sex.

LaVey divided his system of magic into greater and lesser magic. Greater magic being a form of ritual practice meant as psychodramatic catharsis to focus one's emotional energy for a specific purpose. These rites are based on three major psycho-emotive themes: compassion (love), destruction (hate), and sex (lust). The space in which a ritual is performed is known as an "intellectual decompression chamber", where skepticism and disbelief are willfully suspended, thus allowing the magicians to fully express their mental and emotional needs, holding back nothing regarding their deepest feelings and desires. This magic could then be employed to ensure sexual gratification, material gain, personal success, or to curse one's enemies. LaVey also wrote of "the balance factor", insisting that any magical aims should be realistic. These rituals are often considered to be magical acts, with LaVey's Satanism encouraging the practice of magic to aid one's selfish ends. Much of Satanic ritual is designed for an individual to carry out alone; this is because concentration is seen as key to performing magical acts.

Lesser magic, also referred to an "everyday" or "situational" magic, is the practice of manipulation by means of applied psychology. LaVey defined it as "wile and guile obtained through various devices and contrived situations, which when utilized, can create change in accordance with one's will." LaVey wrote that a key concept in lesser magic is the "command to look", which can be accomplished by utilizing elements of "sex, sentiment, and wonder", in addition to the utilization of looks, body language, scents, color, patterns, and odor. This system encourages a form of manipulative role-play, wherein the practitioner may alter several elements of their physical appearance in order to aid them in seducing or "bewitching" on object of desire.

LaVey developed "The Synthesizer Clock", the purpose of which is to divide humans into distinct groups of people based primarily on body shape and personality traits. The synthesizer is modeled as a clock, and based on concepts of somatotypes. The clock is intended to aid a witch in identifying themselves, subsequently aiding in utilizing the "attraction of opposites" to "spellbind" the witch's object of desire by assuming the opposite role. The successful application of lesser magic is said to be built upon one's understanding of their place on the clock. Upon finding your position on the clock, you are encouraged to adapt it as seen fit, and perfect your type by harmonizing its element for better success. Dyrendal referred to LaVey's techniques as "Erving Goffman meets William Mortensen". Drawing insights from psychology, biology, and sociology, Petersen noted that lesser magic combines occult and "rejected sciences of body analysis [and] temperaments."

== The Satanic Bible ==
As a result of the success of the film Rosemary's Baby and the concomitant growth of interest in Satanism, an editor at Avon Books, Peter Mayer, approached LaVey and commissioned him to write a book, which became The Satanic Bible. While part of the text was LaVey's original writing, other sections of the book consisted of direct quotations from Arthur Desmond's right-wing tract Might Is Right and the occultist Aleister Crowley's version of John Dee's Enochian Keys. There is evidence that LaVey was inspired by the writings of the American philosopher Ayn Rand; and while accusations that he plagiarized her work in The Satanic Bible have been denied by one author, Chris Mathews stated that "LaVey stole selectively and edited lightly" and that his "Satanism at times closely parallels Ayn Rand's Objectivist philosophy." The book The Satanic Bible served to present LaVey's ideas to a far wider audience than they had previously had. In 1972, he published a sequel, The Satanic Rituals.

The Satanic Bible has been in print since 1969 and has been translated into various languages. Lewis argued that although LaVeyan Satanists do not treat The Satanic Bible as a sacred text in the way many other religious groups treat their holy texts, it nevertheless is "treated as an authoritative document which effectively functions as scripture within the Satanic community". In particular, Lewis highlighted that many Satanists – both members of the Church of Satan and other groups – quote from it either to legitimize their own position or to de-legitimize the positions of others in a debate. Many other Satanist groups and individual Satanists who are not part of the Church of Satan also recognize LaVey's work as influential.

Many Satanists attribute their conversions or discoveries of Satanism to The Satanic Bible, with 20 percent of respondents to a survey by James Lewis mentioning The Satanic Bible directly as influencing their conversion. For members of the church, the book is said to serve not only as a compendium of ideas but also to judge the authenticity of someone's claim to be a Satanist. LaVey's writings have been described as "cornerstones" within the church and its teachings, and have been supplemented with the writings of its later High Priest, Gilmore, namely his book, The Satanic Scriptures.

The Satanic Bible has been described as the most important document to influence contemporary Satanism. The book contains the core principles of Satanism, and is considered the foundation of its philosophy and dogma. On their website, the Church of Satan urge anyone seeking to learn about LaVeyan Satanism to read The Satanic Bible, stating that doing so is "tantamount to understanding at least the basics of Satanism". Petersen noted that it is "in many ways the central text of the Satanic milieu", with Lap similarly testifying to its dominant position within the wider Satanic movement. David G. Bromley calls it "iconoclastic" and "the best-known and most influential statement of Satanic theology." Eugene V. Gallagher says that Satanists use LaVey's writings "as lenses through which they view themselves, their group, and the cosmos." He also states: "With a clear-eyed appreciation of true human nature, a love of ritual and pageantry, and a flair for mockery, LaVey's Satanic Bible promulgated a gospel of self-indulgence that, he argued, anyone who dispassionately considered the facts would embrace."

The "central convictions" of LaVeyan Satanism are formulated into three lists, which are regularly reproduced within the Church of Satan's written material.

== Statements of basic tenets ==
=== The Nine Satanic Statements ===
The alchemical symbol for black sulfur, as it appears in The Satanic Bible above the Nine Satanic Statements.

The Nine Satanic Statements are a set of nine assertions made by LaVey in the introductory chapters of The Satanic Bible. They are considered a touchstone of contemporary organized Satanism that constitute, in effect, brief aphorisms that capture Satanic philosophy. The first three statements touch on "indulgence", "vital existence" and "undefiled wisdom" which presents a positive view of the Satanist as a carnal, physical and pragmatic being, where enjoyment of physical existence and an undiluted view of this-worldly truth are promoted as the core values of Satanism, combining elements of Darwinism and Epicureanism. Statement four, five and six deal in matters of ethics, through "kindness to those who deserve it", "vengeance" and "responsibility to the responsible", painting a harsh picture of society and human relations by emphasizing justice rather than love. Statements seven, eight and nine reject the dignity of man, sin and the Christian church. Humans are characterized as "just another animal", traditional "sins" are promoted as means for gratification, and religion as mere business. The adversarial and antinomian aspect of Satan takes precedence in support of statements four through nine, with non-conformity being presented as a core ideal.

1. Satan represents indulgence instead of abstinence.
2. Satan represents vital existence instead of spiritual pipe dreams.
3. Satan represents undefiled wisdom instead of hypocritical self-deceit.
4. Satan represents kindness to those who deserve it, instead of love wasted on ingrates.
5. Satan represents vengeance instead of turning the other cheek.
6. Satan represents responsibility to the responsible instead of concern for psychic vampires.
7. Satan represents man as just another animal who, because of his "divine spiritual and intellectual development", has become the most vicious animal of all.
8. Satan represents all of the so-called sins, as they all lead to physical, mental, or emotional gratification.
9. Satan has been the best friend the Church has ever had, as he has kept it in business all these years.

=== The Eleven Satanic Rules of the Earth ===
1. Do not give opinions or advice unless you are asked.
2. Do not tell your troubles to others unless you are sure they want to hear them.
3. When in another's home, show them respect or else do not go there.
4. If a guest in your home annoys you, treat them cruelly and without mercy.
5. Do not make sexual advances unless you are given the mating signal.
6. Do not take that which does not belong to you unless it is a burden to the other person and they cry out to be relieved.
7. Acknowledge the power of magic if you have employed it successfully to obtain your desires. If you deny the power of magic after having called upon it with success, you will lose all you have obtained.
8. Do not complain about anything to which you need not subject yourself.
9. Do not harm little children.
10. Do not kill non-human animals unless you are attacked or for your food.
11. When walking in open territory, bother no one. If someone bothers you, ask him to stop. If he does not stop, destroy him.

=== The Nine Satanic Sins ===
These sins, published by LaVey in 1987, outline characteristics Satanists should avoid:

1. Stupidity
2. Pretentiousness
3. Solipsism
4. Self-deceit
5. Herd Conformity
6. Lack of Perspective
7. Forgetfulness of Past Orthodoxies
8. Counterproductive Pride
9. Lack of Aesthetics

=== Pentagonal Revisionism ===
Pentagonal Revisionism is a plan consisting of five major goals written in 1988 by LaVey:

1. Stratification – "There can be no more myth of "equality" for all—it only translates to "mediocrity" and supports the weak at the expense of the strong. Water must be allowed to seek its own level without interference from apologists for incompetence. No one should be protected from the effects of his own stupidity."
2. Strict taxation of all churches – "The productive, the creative, the resourceful should be subsidized. So long as the useless and incompetent are getting paid, they should be heavily taxed."
3. No tolerance for religious beliefs secularized and incorporated into law and order issues – "Amnesty should be considered for anyone in prison because of their alleged 'influence' upon the actual perpetrator of the crime. Everyone is influenced in what he or she does. Scapegoating has become a way of life, a means of survival for the unfit. As an extension of the Judeo-Christian cop-out of blaming the Devil for everything, criminals can gain leniency, even praise, by placing the blame on a convenient villain. Following the Satanic creed of "Responsibility to the responsible", in a Satanic society, everyone must experience the consequences of their own actions—for good or ill."
4. Development and production of artificial human companions – "An economic 'godsend' which will allow everyone "power" over someone else. Polite, sophisticated, technologically feasible slavery. And the most profitable industry since T.V. and the computer."
5. The opportunity for anyone to live within a total environment of their choice, with mandatory adherence to the aesthetic and behavioral standards of same – "Privately owned, operated and controlled environments as an alternative to homogenized and polyglot ones. The freedom to insularize oneself within a social milieu of personal well-being. An opportunity to feel, see, and hear that which is most aesthetically pleasing, without interference from those who would pollute or detract from that option."

== Differences with other beliefs ==
LaVey claims that Satanism is more realistic about human nature and behavior than other religions; more forthright in their values and activities, such as materialism and extramarital sex, than non-satanic religious hypocrites; that traditional religious structure no longer provides many individuals "with the social imperatives of meaning and motivation." Consequently LaVey insists that Satanism is only the "logical culmination of American culture's spiritual trend".

LaVeyan Satanism is "rational", without belief in a supernatural Satan, in stark contrast to the "Theistic Satanism" of group such as the Temple of Set. Not all rational Satanists follow LaVey. The Satanic Temple (TST) was founded in 2013 as a reaction to the "culture war" (particularly in the United States) over abortion, gun politics, separation of church and state, privacy, recreational drug use, homosexuality, censorship, and the political success of the shrinking population (in recent decades) of traditionalists and conservatives. Reportedly the "most prominent" Satanic organization "in terms of both size and public activity" (as of late 2023), the growth of the Temple has been explained by increasing interest among secular non-theists in "left-wing" social activism against Christian conservative power and in favor of separation of church and state, reproductive rights, and transgender rights, that has come at the expense of ignoring the LaVeyan focus on "getting what you want for yourself" selfishness and elitism.

== Rites and practices ==
=== Rites and ceremonies ===
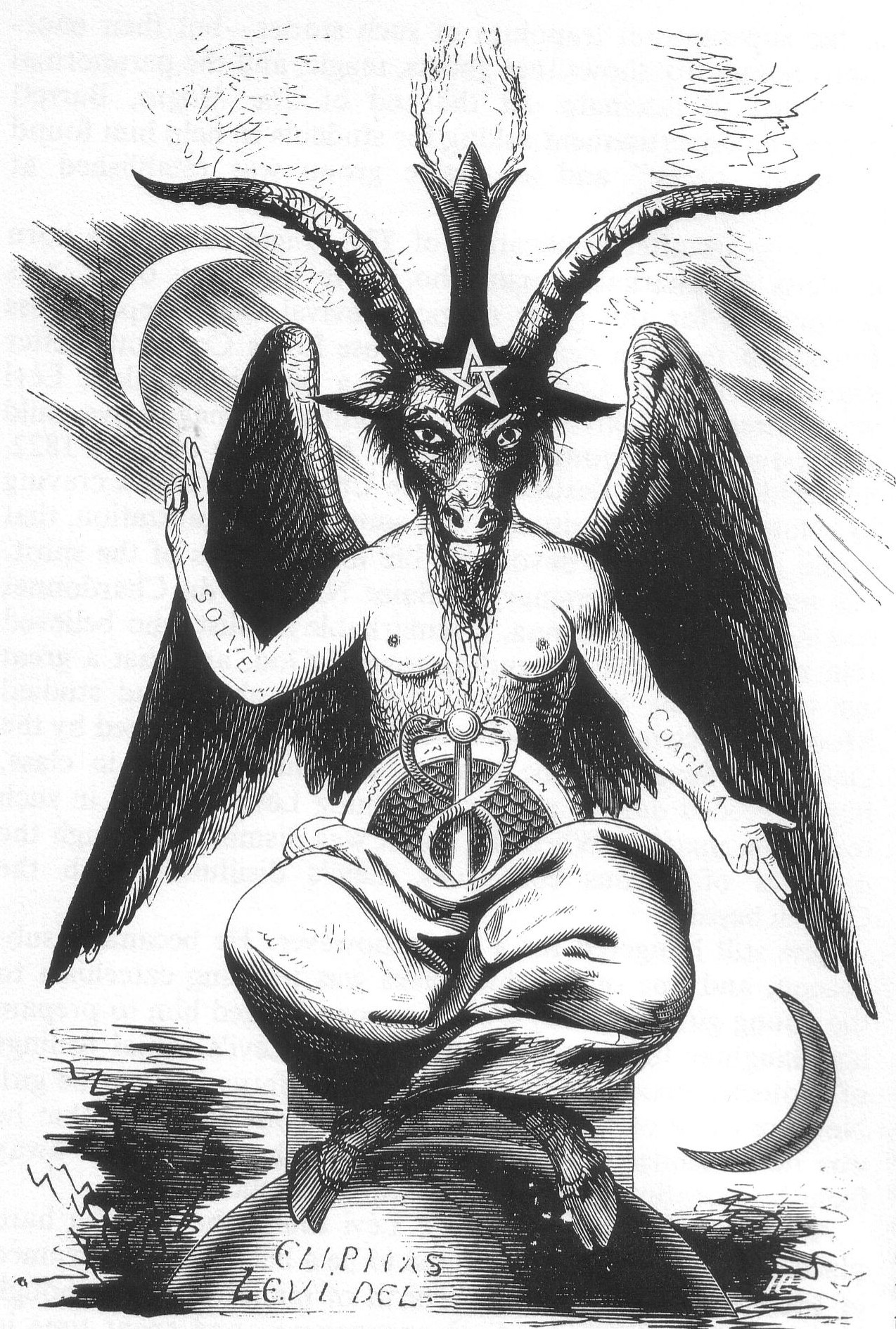
Eliphas Levi's image of Baphomet is embraced by LaVeyan Satanists as a symbol of duality, fertility, and the "powers of darkness", serving as the namesake of their primary insignia, The Sigil of Baphomet.

LaVey emphasized that in his tradition, Satanic rites came in two forms, neither of which were acts of worship; in his terminology, "rituals" were intended to bring about change, whereas "ceremonies" celebrated a particular occasion. These rituals were often considered to be magical acts, with LaVey's Satanism encouraging the practice of magic to aid one's selfish ends. Much of LaVeyan ritual is designed for an individual to carry out alone; this is because concentration is seen as key to performing magical acts. In The Satanic Bible, LaVey described three types of ritual in his religion: sex rituals designed to attract the desired romantic or sexual partner, compassionate rituals with the intent of helping people (including oneself), and destructive magic which seeks to do harm to others. In designing these rituals, LaVey drew upon a variety of older sources, with scholar of Satanism Per Faxneld noting that LaVey "assembled rituals from a hodgepodge of historical sources, literary as well as esoteric".

LaVey described a number of rituals in his book, The Satanic Rituals; these are "dramatic performances" with specific instructions surrounding the clothing to be worn, the music to be used, and the actions to be taken. This attention to detail in the design of the rituals was intentional, with their pageantry and theatricality intending to engage the participants' senses and aesthetic sensibilities at various levels and enhancing the participants' willpower for magical ends. LaVey prescribed that male participants should wear black robes, while older women should wear black, and other women should dress attractively in order to stimulate sexual feelings among many of the men. All participants are instructed to wear amulets of either the upturned pentagram or the image of Baphomet.

According to LaVey's instructions, on the altar is to be placed an image of Baphomet. This should be accompanied by various candles, all but one of which are to be black. The lone exception is to be a white candle, used in destructive magic, which is kept to the right of the altar. Also to be included are a bell which is rung nine times at the start and end of the ceremony, a chalice made of anything but gold, and which contains an alcoholic drink symbolizing the "Elixir of Life", a sword that represents aggression, a model phallus used as an aspergillum, a gong, and parchment on which requests to Satan are to be written before being burned. Although alcohol was consumed in the church's rites, drunkenness was frowned upon and the taking of illicit drugs was forbidden.

LaVeyan rituals sometimes include anti-Christian blasphemies, which are intended to have a liberating effect on the participants. In some of the rituals, a naked woman serves as the altar; in these cases it is made explicit that the woman's body itself becomes the altar, rather than have her simply lying on an existing altar. In contrast to longstanding stereotypes about Satanists, there is no place for sexual orgies in LaVeyan ritual. Neither animal nor human sacrifice takes place. Children are banned from attending these rituals, with the only exception being the Satanic Baptism, which is specifically designed to involve infants.

LaVey also developed his own Black Mass, which was designed as a form of deconditioning to free the participant from any inhibitions that they developed living in Christian society. He noted that in composing the Black Mass rite, he had drawn upon the work of the French fiction writers Charles Baudelaire and Joris-Karl Huysmans. LaVey openly toyed with the use of literature and popular culture in other rituals and ceremonies, thus appealing to artifice, pageantry, and showmanship. For instance, he published an outline of a ritual which he termed the "Call to Cthulhu" which drew upon the stories of the alien god Cthulhu authored by American horror writer H. P. Lovecraft. In this rite, set to take place at night in a secluded location near to a turbulent body of water, a celebrant takes on the role of Cthulhu and appears before the assembled Satanists, signing a pact between them in the language of Lovecraft's fictional "Old Ones".

=== Holidays ===
In The Satanic Bible, LaVey writes that "after one's own birthday, the two major Satanic holidays are Walpurgisnacht and Halloween." Other holidays celebrated by members include the two solstices, the two equinoxes, and Yule.

=== Symbolism ===
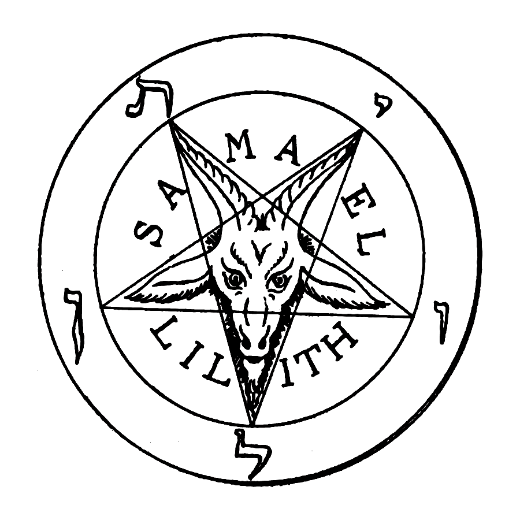
The Sigil of Baphomet

As a symbol of his Satanic church, LaVey adopted the upturned five-pointed pentagram. The upturned pentagram had previously been used by the French occultist Eliphas Lévi, and had been adopted by his disciple, Stanislas de Guaita, who merged it with a goat's head in his 1897 book, Key of Black Magic. In the literature and imagery predating LaVey, imagery used to represent the "satanic" is denoted by inverted crosses and blasphemous parodies of Christian art. The familiar goat's head inside an inverted pentagram did not become the foremost symbol of Satanism until the founding of the Church of Satan in 1966. LaVey learned of this variant of the symbol after it had been reproduced on the front cover of Maurice Bessy's coffee table book, Pictorial History of Magic and the Supernatural. Feeling that this symbol embodied his philosophy, LaVey decided to adopt it for his Church. In its formative years, the church utilized this image on its membership cards, stationery, medallions and most notably above the altar in the ritual chamber of the Black House.

During the writing of The Satanic Bible, it was decided that a unique version of the symbol should be rendered to be identified exclusively with the church. LaVey created a new version of Guaita's image, one which was geometrically precise, with two perfect circles surrounding the pentagram, the goat head redrawn, and the Hebrew lettering altered to look more serpentine. LaVey had this design copyrighted to the church, claiming authorship under the pseudonym of "Hugo Zorilla". In doing so, the symbol – which came to be known as the Sigil of Baphomet – came to be closely associated with Satanism in the public imagination.

== History ==
=== Origins: 1966–72 ===
Although there were forms of religious Satanism that predated the creation of LaVeyan Satanism—namely those propounded by Stanisław Przybyszewski and Ben Kadosh—these had no unbroken lineage of succession to LaVey's form. For this reason, the sociologist of religion Massimo Introvigne stated that "with few exceptions, LaVey is at the origins of all contemporary Satanism". Similarly, the historian Ruben van Luijk claimed that the creation of LaVeyan Satanism marked "the actual beginning of Satanism as a religion such as it is practiced in the world today".

After he came to public attention, LaVey shielded much of his early life in secrecy, and little is known about it for certain. He had been born in Chicago as Howard Stanton Levey in either March or April 1930. He was of mixed Ukrainian, Russian, and German ancestry. He claimed to have worked in the circus and carnival in the years following the Second World War, and in later years, he also alleged that he worked at the San Francisco Orchestra, although this never existed. He also claimed to have had a relationship with a young Marilyn Monroe, although this too was untrue.

By the 1960s he was living at 6114 California Street in San Francisco, a house that he had inherited from his parents. He took an interest in occultism and amassed a large collection of books on the subject. At some point between 1957 and 1960 he began hosting classes at his house every Friday in which lectures on occultism and other subjects were given. Among the topics covered were freaks, extra-sensory perception, Spiritualism, cannibalism, and historical methods of torture. Attendees of these lectures coalesced into an informal group which came to be known as the Magic Circle. Among those affiliated with this gathering were the filmmaker and Thelemite occultist Kenneth Anger, and the anthropologist Michael Harner, who later established the core shamanism movement.

LaVey likely began preparations for the formation of his Church of Satan in either 1965 or early 1966, and it was officially founded on Walpurgisnacht 1966. He then declared that 1966 marked Year One of the new Satanic era. It was the first organized church in modern times to be devoted to the figure of Satan, and according to Faxneld and Petersen, the church represented "the first public, highly visible, and long-lasting organisation which propounded a coherent satanic discourse". Its early members were the attendees of LaVey's Magic Circle, although it soon began attracting new recruits. Many of these individuals were sadomasochists or homosexuals, attracted by the LaVeyan openness to different sexual practices. LaVey had painted his house black, with it becoming known as "the Black House", and it was here that weekly rituals were held every Friday night.

LaVey played up to his Satanic associations by growing a pointed beard and wearing a black cloak and inverted pentagram. He added to his eccentric persona by obtaining unusual pets, including a lion that was kept caged in his back garden. Describing himself as the "High Priest of Satan", LaVey defined his position within the church as "monarchical in nature, papal in degree and absolute in power". He led the churches' governing Council of Nine, and implemented a system of five initiatory levels that the LaVeyan Satanist could advance through by demonstrating their knowledge of LaVeyan philosophy and their personal accomplishments in life. These were known as Apprentice Satanist I°, Witch or Warlock II°, Priest or Priestess of Mendes III°, Magister IV°, and Magus V°.

Never one for theory, LaVey created a belief system somewhere between religion, philosophy, psychology, and carnival (or circus), freely appropriating science, mythology, fringe beliefs, and play in a potent mix. The core goal was always indulgence and vital existence, based on the devices and desires of the self-made man.

— Per Faxneld and Jesper Petersen.

The church experienced its "golden age" from 1966 to 1972, when it had a strong media presence. In February 1967, LaVey held a much publicized Satanic wedding, which was followed by the Satanic baptism of his daughter Zeena in May, and then a Satanic funeral in December. Another publicity-attracting event was the "Topless Witch Revue", a nightclub show held on San Francisco's North Beach; the use of topless women to attract attention alienated a number of the church's early members. Through these and other activities, he soon attracted international media attention, being dubbed "the Black Pope". He also attracted a number of celebrities to join his Church, most notably Sammy Davis Junior and Jayne Mansfield. LaVey also established branches of the church, known as grottos, in various parts of the United States. He may have chosen the term grotto over coven because the latter term had come to be used by practitioners of the modern Pagan religion of Wicca. These included the Babylon Grotto in Detroit, the Stygian Grotto in Dayton, and the Lilith Grotto in New York City. In 1971, a Dutch follower of LaVey's, Maarten Lamers, established his own Kerk van Satan grotto in Amsterdam.

Following the success of the film Rosemary's Baby, LaVey wrote the book The Satanic Bible, borrowing from Arthur Desmond, Aleister Crowley and Ayn Rand. The Satanic Bible spread LaVey's ideas to a wide audience, and led to a 1972 sequel, The Satanic Rituals.

LaVey's Church emerged at a point in American history when Christianity was on the decline as many of the nation's youth broke away from their parental faith and explored alternative systems of religiosity. The milieu in which LaVey's Church was operating was dominated by the counterculture of the 1960s; his Church reflected some of its concerns – free love, alternative religions, freedom from church and state – but ran contrary to some of the counterculture's other main themes, such as peace and love, compassion, and the use of mind-altering drugs. He expressed condemnation of the hippies; in one ritual he hung an image of Timothy Leary upside down while stamping on a tablet of LSD.

=== Later development: 1972–present ===
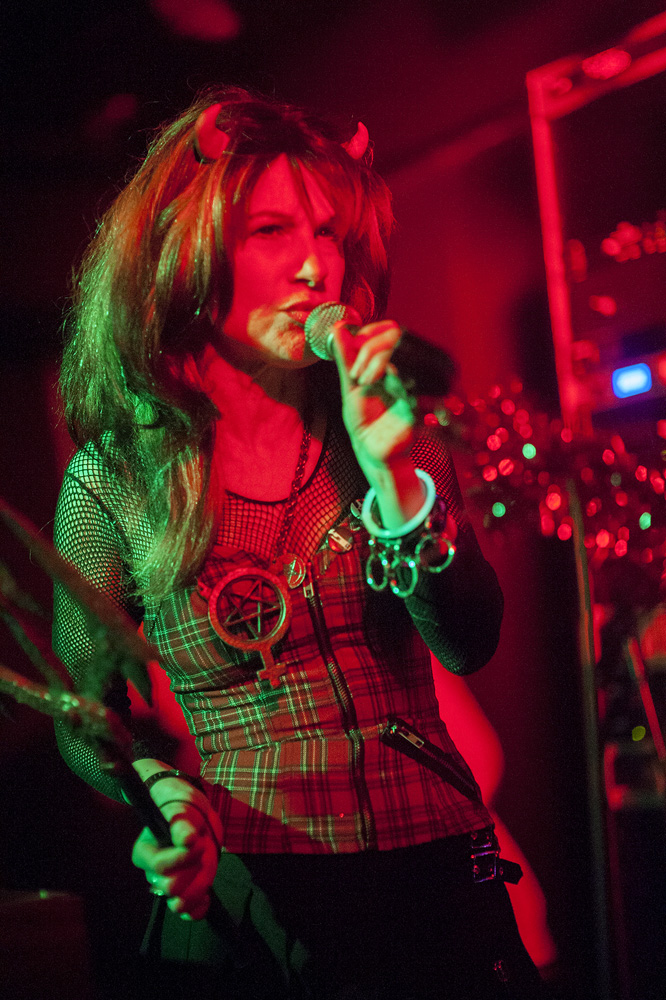
Karla LaVey, founder of the First Satanic Church, in 2012

LaVey ceased conducting group rituals and workshops in his home in 1972. In 1973, church leaders in Michigan, Ohio, and Florida split to form their own Church of Satanic Brotherhood, however this disbanded in 1974 when one of its founders publicly converted to Christianity. Subsequently, Church members based in Kentucky and Indiana left to found the Ordo Templi Satanis. In 1975, LaVey disbanded all grottos, leaving the organisation as a membership-based group that existed largely on paper. He claimed that this had been necessary because the grottos had come to be dominated by social misfits who had not benefitted the church as a whole. In a private letter, he expressed frustration that despite growing church membership, "brain surgeons and Congressmen are still in short supply". He also announced that thenceforth all higher degrees in the church would be awarded in exchange for contributions of cash, real estate, or valuable art. Dissatisfied with these actions, in 1975, the high-ranking Church member Michael Aquino left to found his own Satanic organisation, the Temple of Set, which differed from LaVey's Church by adopting a belief that Satan literally existed. According to Lap, from this point on Satanism became a "splintered and disorganized movement".

Between the abolition of the grotto system in 1975 and the establishment of the internet in the mid-1990s, The Satanic Bible remained the primary means of propagating Satanism. During this period, a decentralized, anarchistic movement of Satanists developed that was shaped by many of the central themes that had pervaded LaVey's thought and which was expressed in The Satanic Bible. Lewis argued that in this community, The Satanic Bible served as a "quasi-scripture" because these independent Satanists were able to adopt certain ideas from the book while merging them with ideas and practices drawn from elsewhere.

During the late 1980s, LaVey returned to the limelight, giving media interviews, attracting further celebrities, and reinstating the grotto system. In 1984 he separated from his wife, Diane Hegarty, and began a relationship with Blanche Barton, who was his personal assistant. In 1988 Hegarty brought a court case against LaVey, claiming that she owned half of the church and LaVey's Black House. The court found in Hegarty's favour, after which LaVey immediately declared bankruptcy. In May 1992, the ex-couple reached a settlement. The Black House was sold to a wealthy friend, the property developer Donald Werby, who agreed to allow LaVey to continue living at the residence for free. Also in 1992, LaVey published his first book in twenty years, The Devil's Notebook. This was followed by the posthumous Satan Speaks in 1998, which included a foreword from the rock singer Marilyn Manson, who was an honorary priest in the church.

In his final years, LaVey suffered from a heart condition, displayed increasing paranoia, and died in October 1997. In November, the church announced that it would subsequently be run by two High Priestesses of joint rank, Barton and LaVey's daughter Karla LaVey. That same year, the church established an official website. Barton attempted to purchase the Black House from Werby, but was unable to raise sufficient funds; the building had fallen into disrepair and was demolished in 2001, subsequently being replaced with an apartment block. A disagreement subsequently emerged between Barton and Karla, resulting in an agreement that Barton would retain legal ownership of the name and organization of the church while LaVey's personal belongings and copyrights would be distributed among his three children, Karla, Zeena, and Satan Xerxes. Barton stood down as High Priestess in 2002, although continued to chair the church's Council of Nine. The headquarters of the church were then moved from San Francisco to New York, where Peter H. Gilmore was appointed the church's High Priest, and his wife Peggy Nadramia as its High Priestess.

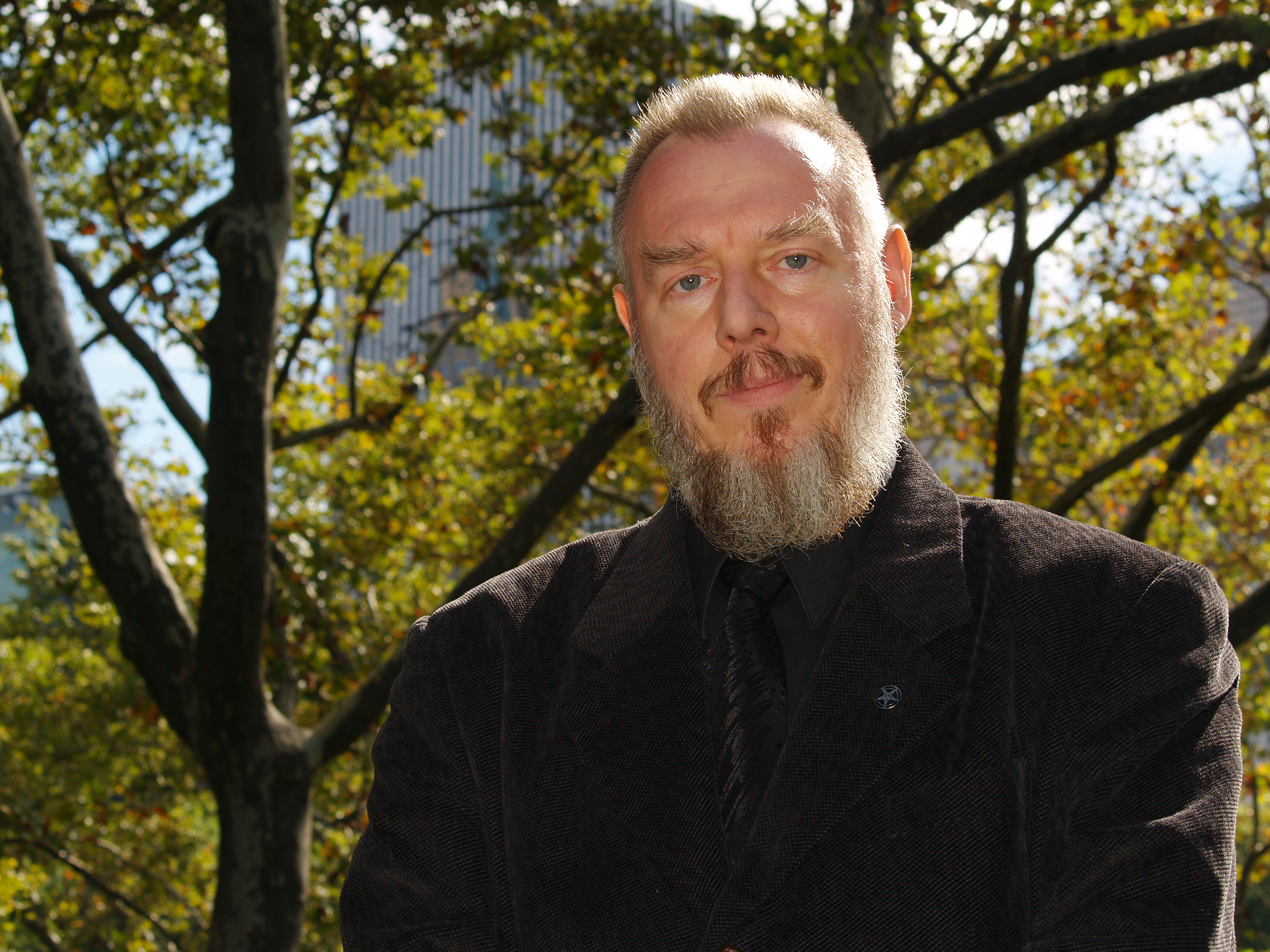
Peter Gilmore, High Priest of the Church of Satan

After LaVey's death, conflict over the nature of Satanism intensified within the Satanic community. At Halloween 1999 Karla established the First Satanic Church, which uses its website to promote the idea that it represents a direct continuation of the original Church of Satan as founded by Anton LaVey. Other LaVeyan groups appeared elsewhere in the United States. An early member of the Church of Satan, John Dewey Allee, established his own First Church of Satan, claiming allegiance to LaVey's original teachings and professing that LaVey himself had deviated from them in later life. In 1986, Paul Douglas Valentine founded the New York City-based World Church of Satanic Liberation, having recruited many of its members through Herman Slater's Magickal Childe esoteric store. Its membership remained small and it was discontinued in 2011. In 1991, the Embassy of Lucifer was established by the Canadian Tsirk Susuej, which was influenced by LaVeyan teachings but held that Satan was a real entity. Splinter groups from Susuej's organisation included the Embassy of Satan in Stewart, British Columbia, and the Luciferian Light Group in Baltimore.

LaVeyan groups also cropped up elsewhere in the world, with a particular concentration in Scandinavia; most of these Scandinavian groups either split from the Church of Satan or never affiliated with it. These included the Svenska Satanistkyrkan and the Det Norske Sataniske Samfunn, as well as the Prometheus Grotten of the Church of Satan which was established in Denmark in 1997 but which officially seceded in 2000. A Satanic Church was also established in Estonia based on the LaVeyan model; it later renamed itself the Order of the Black Widow.

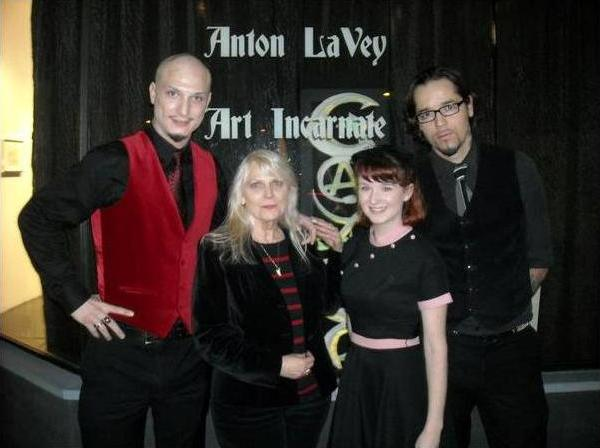
Diane LaVey & Stanton LaVey at “Anton LaVey – Art Incarnate" auction in Glendale California on February 14, 2009.

The Church of Satan became increasingly doctrinally-rigid and focused on maintaining the purity of LaVeyan Satanism. The church's increased emphasis on their role as the bearer of LaVey's legacy was partly a response to the growth in non-LaVeyan Satanists. Some Church members – including Gilmore – claimed that only they were the "real" Satanists and that those belonging to different Satanic traditions were "pseudo" Satanists. After examining many of these claims on the church's website, Lewis concluded that it was "obsessed with shoring up its own legitimacy by attacking the heretics, especially those who criticize LaVey". Meanwhile, the church experienced an exodus of its membership in the 2000s, with many of these individuals establishing new groups online. Although the church's public face had performed little ceremonial activity since the early 1970s, in June 2006 they held a Satanic 'High Mass' in Los Angeles to mark the church's fortieth birthday.

== Demographics ==
Unlike some Satanic cults such as Process Church of the Final Judgement, Church of Satan members adhere to relatively conventional lifestyles and behavior, avoiding drugs and excessive alcohol, dressing conventionally. The church also screens membership applications to exclude "sensation seekers" and prison inmates.

Membership levels of the Church of Satan are hard to determine, as the organisation has not released such information. During its early years, the church claimed a membership of around 10,000, although defectors subsequently claimed that the number was only in the hundreds. Membership was largely, although not exclusively, white. LaVey recognised this, suggesting that the church appealed particularly to white Americans because they lacked the strong sense of ethnic identity displayed by African-Americans and Hispanic Americans. The historian of religion Massimo Introvigne suggested that it had never had more than 1000 or 2000 members at its height, but that LaVeyan ideas had had a far greater influence through LaVey's books. Membership is gained by paying $225 and filling out a registration statement, and thus initiates are bestowed with lifetime memberships and not charged annual fees.

La Fontaine thought it likely that the easy availability of LaVey's writings would have encouraged the creation of various Satanic groups that were independent of the Church of Satan itself. In The Black Flame, a number of groups affiliated with the church has been mentioned, most of which are based in the United States and Canada although two groups were cited as having existed in New Zealand. In his 2001 examination of Satanists, the sociologist James R. Lewis noted that, to his surprise, his findings "consistently pointed to the centrality of LaVey's influence on modern Satanism". "Reflecting the dominant influence of Anton LaVey's thought", Lewis noted that the majority of those whom he examined were atheists or agnostics, with 60% of respondents viewing Satanism as a symbol rather than a real entity. 20% of his respondents described The Satanic Bible as the most important factor that attracted them to Satanism. Elsewhere, Lewis noted that few Satanists who were not members of the Church of Satan would regard themselves as "orthodox LaVeyans".

Examining the number of LaVeyan Satanists in the United Kingdom, in 1995 the religious studies scholar Graham Harvey wrote that the Church of Satan had no organized presence in the country. He noted that LaVey's writings were widely accessible in British bookshops, and La Fontaine suggested that there may have been individual Church members within the country.

== Acceptance ==
For a number of reasons, LaVey's Satanism achieved "a measure of social legitimization" and established for themselves an image as a "legitimate, conventional, and nonthreatening religious entity", at least in the United States (according to researchers Taub and Nelson). As "establishment" Satanists they are hedonistic and self-centered, but are not sanctioned by the law provided they appear to be operating within the law. A possible reason for such acceptance has been said to be the growing skepticism of the supernatural and so people "find it difficult to take seriously" that those in an earlier era might have been burned at the stake.

== Criticism ==
Anton LaVey has been sarcastically called a "marketing genius" and described as being motivated more by showmanship and entrepreneurship than any religious/philosophical vision. (Note: LaVey was not a philosopher in any conventional sense. He was above all, a showman who had a gift for publicity stunts, and had a strong sense as a businessman. He accurately noted that in an age of intense secularization in an emerging post-Christian West, the spiritual void could still be filled by emerging and profitable religions.) He "often spoke in terms of 'conning the rubes,'" and admitted that he lied "constantly, incessantly."

According to one CoS priest (and journalist) Gavin Baddeley, LaVey's Satanism was "a bizarre beast, sustained by a web of conflicting values and concepts", including "a love of life garbed in the symbols of death and fear." Baddeley complained that LaVey pontificated the sacred importance of personal freedom, but as leader of the Church "micromanaged the lives of his followers".

Other contradictions in his thought have been explained by his wanting it to have as wide appeal as possible. He reportedly frequently referred to an axiom he called "a Satanic magical formula", which was to balance "nine parts" of "respectability" to "one part" of "outrageousness". Satanism requiring some outrageous/anti-social elements if it was to be Satanic, but not so much as to frighten off potential congregants and attract unwanted attention if it was to be a viable organization.

Another issue for which LaVey was criticized was his "ambivalent relationship" with far right figures and groups such as Robert Shelton of the United Klans of America, James Madole (1927–79) of the white supremacist National Renaissance Party, and the American Nazi Party. LaVey neither endorsed nor rejected any of these people or groups. This earned him the criticism of 1971 Newsweek magazine ("If there is anything fundamentally diabolic about LaVey, it stems more from the echoes of Nazism in his theories than from the horror-comic trappings of his cult"), and religious studies scholar Joseph P. Laycock, who thought LaVey likely found "the idea of totalitarianism romantic", the Nazi aesthetic cool, and the "hinting at Nazi sympathies" a way to keep his image "suitably sinister".

== See also ==
- Contemporary Religious Satanism – 2009 academic anthology
- Satanic ritual abuse – Widespread moral panic alleging abuse
- Devil in popular culture
- Conceptions of God
- Nontheistic religion – Religious thought and practice independent of belief in deities
- Religious naturalism – Naturalism in religion
- Secular religion – Communal belief system without the supernatural
- Temple of Set
- The Satanic Temple
