= Gavin Baddeley =

British journalist (born 1966)

- Born: 1966 (age 59–60); Cambridge, England
- Occupations: Writer, journalist
- Organization: Church of Satan
- Website: www.gavinbaddeley.com

Gavin Baddeley (born 1966) is a British writer and journalist, and an ordained Reverend in the Church of Satan. He has been profiled in The Guardian and Evening Standard. He made an appearance in the documentary film Metal: A Headbanger's Journey. He was an editor of the CoS magazine, Satannia. He is a frequent TV commentator and consulted expert on the subjects of the occult and satanic.

Baddeley became a Satanist after he interviewed Anton LaVey as a journalist. He was ordained into the Church of Satan by LaVey, and subsequently set up the London branch of the church. In 1999, he wrote Lucifer Rising, covering both the recent and ancient history of Satanism, and provides an examination of modern Satanist culture. Organized into three parts, much of the book is composed of interviews with a wide variety of people associated with Satanic religion or its concomitant aesthetic, including LaVey, Kenneth Anger, and Kerry Bolton. He has authored several other books on topics such as goths, and metal music, like The Gospel of Filth.

== Bibliography ==
- —— (1993). Raising Hell!: The Book of Satan and Rock 'n' Roll. Nemesis. ISBN 1-897743-60-2.
- —— (1999). Lucifer Rising: Sin, Devil Worship and Rock 'n' Roll. London: Plexus Publishing. ISBN 0-85965-280-7.
- —— (2000). Dissecting Marilyn Manson. London: Plexus. ISBN 0-85965-283-1.
- —— (2002). Goth Chic: A Connoisseur's Guide To Dark Culture. London: Plexus. ISBN 0-85965-308-0.
- ——; Woods, Paul (2009). God's Assassins: The Medieval Roots of Terrorism. Hersham: Ian Allen. ISBN 978-0-7110-3409-9.
- Woods, Paul; —— (2009). Saucy Jack: The Elusive Ripper. Hersham: Ian Allen. ISBN 978-0-7110-3410-5.
- ——; Filth, Dani (2009). The Gospel of Filth. FAB Press. ISBN 978-1-903254-50-9.
- —— (2010). Vampire Lovers: Screen's Seductive Creatures of the Night. London: Plexus. ISBN 978-0-85965-450-0.
- —— (2010). Goth: Vamps and Dandies. London: Plexus. ISBN 978-0-85965-433-3.
- —— (2019). FrightFest Guide to Werewolf Movies. FAB Press. ISBN 978-1-913051-01-3.
