= Lucifer Rising (Baddeley book) =

1999 book by Gavin Baddeley

- Cover of the first edition
- Author: Gavin Baddeley
- Language: English
- Subject: Satanism
- Publisher: Plexus Publishing
- Publication date: 1999
- Publication place: United Kingdom
- Media type: Print
- Pages: 256
- ISBN: 0-85965-280-7
- OCLC: 43571679
- Dewey Decimal: 133.422

Lucifer Rising: Sin, Devil Worship & Rock 'n' Roll is a book written by journalist and Church of Satan member Gavin Baddeley. It was published by Plexus Publishing in 1999. The book covers both the recent and ancient history of Satanism, and provides an examination of modern Satanist culture, as well as Satanism's influence on popular culture. Organized into three parts, it contains a number of interviews with prominent figures in the Satanist subculture, including Anton LaVey, the founder of the Church of Satan. It received praise for its material and interviews, though received some criticisms for a lack of analysis.

== Background and publication history ==
Lucifer Rising was written by Gavin Baddeley, a British member of the Satanist group the Church of Satan and a journalist. He became a Satanist after seeking out Anton LaVey, the founder of the Church of Satan, in order to interview him. In an interview he said the reasons he wrote the book included providing a definitive source of information of Satanism for those curious about it, and to anger anti-Satanist evangelical Christians. While he was researching for the book, Baddeley interviewed LaVey at length in 1993. LaVey made Baddeley a priest in the organization; LaVey died in 1997, before the book was published.

Lucifer Rising was first published in September 1999 by Plexus Publishing in London, in a 256 page paperback edition. It received another edition from the same publisher in 2006. The book was edited by Paul Woods.

== Contents ==
The book covers both the recent and ancient history of Satanism, and provides an examination of modern Satanist culture. It also examines Satanism's place in popular culture The book is decorated throughout with graphics, mediaeval ornaments, and images. Much of the book is composed of interviews with a wide variety of people associated with Satanic religion or its concomitant aesthetic, including Anton LaVey, Kenneth Anger, and Kerry Bolton. Other individuals discussed in Lucifer Rising include Aleister Crowley, Michael Aquino, and Charles Manson.

The book is divided into three parts, the first of which covers Satanism's history from the beginnings of the Black Mass to the aristocratic members of the Hellfire Club. The second half looks at Satanism in the twentieth century, including Aleister Crowley, the Church of Satan, the Manson Family, and the growth of occult-inspired bands such as Black Sabbath and Led Zeppelin. A chapter is devoted to the connections between Satanism and neo-Nazism. The final section of the book examines the new waves of Thrash Metal, Death Metal, and Scandinavian Black Metal, the Burzum's Varg Vikernes Euronymous' murder, the neo-Nazi element and the religious right's courts quest of heavy metal.

== Reception and analysis ==
The British music magazine Melody Maker called it a worthy book to read, "fascinating and often shocking" and praised it for its interviews, particularly the interview with Euronymous. They listed it as their "Book of the Week" and rated it 4/5 stars. Ken Hollings, writing for the music magazine The Wire, complimented the book's collection of interesting material and interviews from a range of figures, noting LaVey's presence in the book as the most prominent. Hollings criticized the structure and wished for more analysis, saying the book was mostly organized in "loose chronological order". Library Journal listed it among their "Occult/Parapsychology Bestsellers". The British newspaper Evening Post praised it as "fascinating and detailed", as well as the most accessible and comprehensive study of the subject then available. Scholars Jesper Aagaard Petersen and Asbjørn Dyrendal described it as a good study on Satanism and popular culture. Religious scholar Ruben van Lujik noted it in his book Children of Lucifer as one of only a few rare histories of Satanism from a Satanist, which he credited to the subculture's marginality. The Phoenix New Times included it among their list of the "10 best satanic and black metal books".

In an academic article on the history of neo-Nazi Satanism, Spencer Sunshine listed it as one of a few early books that had "no qualms" about covering the subject, unlike most of the academic literature on Satanism, which he accused of ignoring the subject; he wrote that it covered the major neo-Nazi Satanist figures but gave room in its interview sections for such figures to give "dishonest denials". Chris Mathews, in his book Modern Satanism, which is very critical of Satanism, identified it as discussing the subject of connections between the far-right and Satanism at length and with "apparent distaste" for the far-right connections, but said it did not seem to question why Satanists were involved in Nazism. Mathews considered Baddeley's overall assessment of Satanism to be "milquetoast". Both Van Lujik and Sunshine noted it, being a popular rather than an academic work, as less rigorous than an academic work but considered it useful. Van Lujik praised it for its interviews with a number of contemporary Satanists, though said it was "insufficiently annotated".
