= Agartha =

Legendary subterranean kingdom

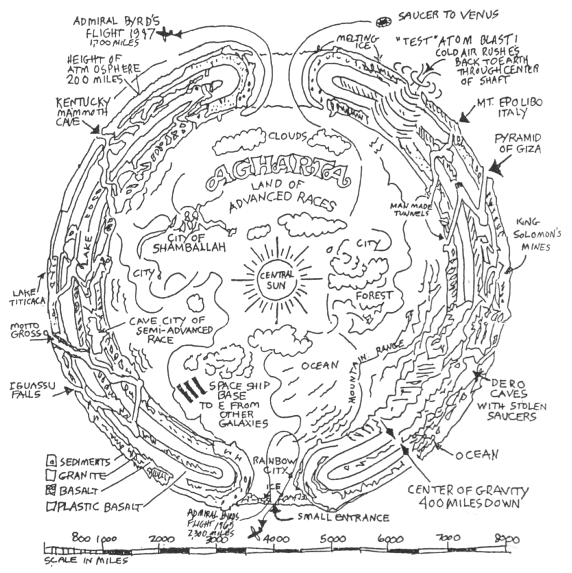
An illustration of Agartha within the hollow Earth, from Walter Siegmeister's 1960 book Agharta

Agartha (variously spelled as Agharta, Aghartta, Agharti, among many other spellings) is a legendary kingdom said to be on the inner surface of the Earth. Though the story has many different versions, Agartha is usually said to be in Central Asia and led by a powerful figure sometimes called the King of the World, who secretly influences the surface. Later versions connect it to the belief in a Hollow Earth. The idea of Agartha has been a popular subject in esotericism, occultism, and the New Age since the late 19th century.

The term and concept dates to the 1870s, first introduced by the French writer and colonial official Louis Jacolliot in his 1873 book Les fils de Dieu. Jacolliot said he had been given access to 15,000-year-old Indian manuscripts that told of the ancient city of Asgartha, its rise, and its fall. The original idea did not involve an underground kingdom, but was said to be India's destroyed former capital city, and is closer to Norse mythology than Indian mythology in content.

Jacolliot's book was popular in France, and the concept of Agartha gained traction. It was expanded upon by a variety of occultist writers, including Alexandre Saint-Yves d'Alveydre, whose book Mission de l'Inde en Europe portrays Agartha as still within the Earth and reachable by astral projection.

The idea was popularized by Ferdynand Ossendowski's 1922 book Beasts, Men and Gods, which was heavily influenced by Saint-Yves and became the standard version of Agartha's myth. Some interpretations involve Nordicism or Aryanism. A derived belief is that of the Grand Lodge of Agartha, a concept in Theosophy and related movements, where a group of ascended masters who secretly control the world are said to live in Agartha. For unclear reasons, it is frequently associated or confused with the Buddhist mythical kingdom Shambhala, alternatively seen as a rival power, with either Agartha as the good to Shambhala's evil, or both as evil.

== Spelling and etymology ==
The spelling of Agartha is inconsistent. Various works spell it as Agartha, Agharta, Aghartta, Agarttha, Agharti, Arghati, and Agardhi. Louis Jacolliot's spelling was Asgartha. One etymology is that Asgartha derives from Asgarth, an alternative spelling of the mythical Norse Asgard. According to this etymology, the 'a' was likely added to make it seem closer to Sanskrit, as the story originally took place in India. Neither the term Agartha nor any variation of it was used before the 1870s, though it is often claimed that the idea is ancient and dates to ancient India.

== Concept ==
Agartha is an immense, legendary kingdom said to be on the Earth's inner surface, sometimes involving a "King of the World" or multiple kings, who are said to rule it and secretly influence events on the surface world. It is typically said to be somewhere beneath Central Asia, Tibet, or the Himalayas. Variations of the story mention hidden entrances to Agartha that include Ayers Rock, the Great Pyramid of Giza, the Earth's poles, Mato Grosso, the Gobi Desert, Cueva de los Tayos, and Kentucky. It is sometimes related to the belief in a hollow Earth, or as the Earth's hidden spiritual center.

Agartha has been a popular subject in esotericism and occultism since the late 19th century. It is also popular in New Age thought and in alternative reality subcultures, though it receives little attention from most modern occultist researchers. There are numerous versions of the story and circumstances of Agartha, many of them inconsistent with each other. The earliest version did not involve an underground kingdom. That may have been taken in part from previous stories of hidden lands in occultism, such as Lemuria, Hyperborea, and Atlantis.

Many Theosophy groups or derived groups share a belief in the Grand Lodge of Agartha, in which ascended masters who secretly control the world dwell. The Order of the Solar Temple was one such group, though it also believed in Agartha generally, and believed in ascended masters living underground in the advanced civilization of Agartha. Notoriously, Solar Temple members committed mass murder-suicide in the 1990s, partially rationalizing this as completing the "cycle" the Grand Lodge of Agartha started.

Separately, Dwight York, leader of the Nuwaubian Nation, titled one of his books Shamballah and Aghaarta: Cities Within the Earth. The Polaires movement believed it communicated with an oracle through number and name manipulation, thereby reaching the "Rosicrucian Initiatic Center of 'Mysterious' Asia", led by Agartha's sages. Some writers have alleged connections between the Nazis and Agartha, but without evidence.

=== Association with Shambhala ===
Agartha is frequently associated or confused with the Buddhist mythical kingdom Shambhala. Some directly equate the two. On another interpretation they are rivals, with Agartha the "Right Hand Way", a land of goodness, and Shambhala the "Left Hand Way". This interpretation's source is unknown.

This interpretation appears in the book The Morning of the Magicians, which calls Agartha "a place of meditation, a hidden city of Goodness, a temple of non-participation in the things of this world". The book says the Agartha–Shambhala rivalry may have originated in the Vril Society or with René Guénon, but Guénon did not write about Shambhala in his book on Agartha, and there is no proof that the Vril Society existed at the time that idea originated. Nevertheless, it began to appear with great frequency in French works on the subject matter.

Esoteric writer Trevor Ravenscroft portrays both as powers of "cosmic evil" and identified both with Rudolf Steiner's idea of two evil forces at odds with one another. According to writer and occultist John Michael Greer, on this interpretation, Agartha represents "a center of the Luciferic influence, the arrogant rejection of matter in favor of the intellect", and Shambhala "the Ahrimanic influence of absolute materialism". The neo-völkisch writer Wilhelm Landig gives this interpretation in his novel Götzen gegen Thule, writing, "Yellow peoples [...] await[...] the coming of a new Great Khan out of the underground realm, Agartha".

== History ==
=== Origins in Louis Jacolliot's Les fils de Dieu ===
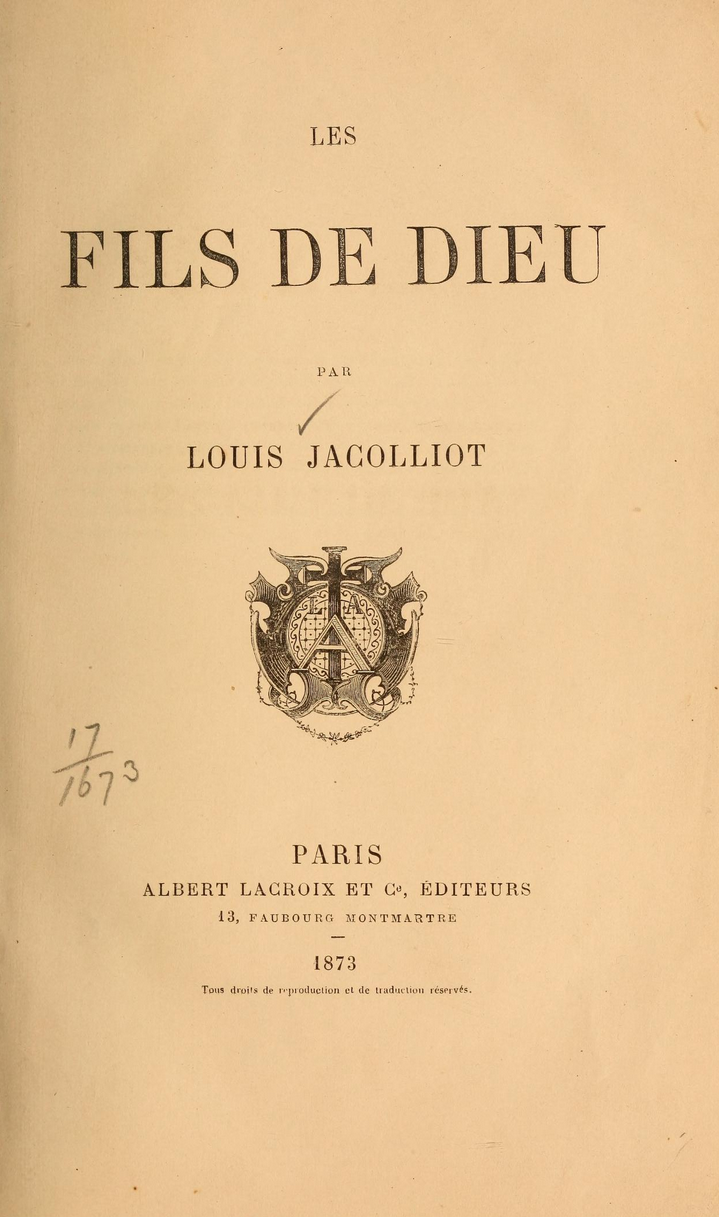
The title page of Les fils de Dieu, the book where the idea of Agartha originates

Greer calls Agartha "one of the most remarkable products of occult history—a rich fabric of legend woven out of a mixture of Victorian anthropology, occult politics, and thin air." Agartha's origins are largely found in Victorian euhemerism, which attempted to interpret mythology as containing references to hidden past history. Due to the prevailing theories of the time, this was usually taken from ancient Germanic myths.

French writer Louis Jacolliot introduced the Agartha myth in his book Les fils de Dieu (1873), lit. 'The Sons of God'. Jacolliot was a colonial official in South India and wrote many popular books, including a trilogy about Indian mythology's relationship to Christianity. He said Brahmin friends of his had given him access to manuscripts that revealed 15,000 years of Indian history, including the story of Asgartha. This is likely untrue: Jacolliot probably made the concept up himself.

Jacolliot did not mention an underground kingdom; Asgartha was said to be an ancient city, the solar capital of India since 13,300 BC. He conceived of it as ruled by the "Brahmatma", manifestations of God and the chief priests of the Brahmins. Jacolliot's Agartha was created not by the Aryans but by their precursors, who were overthrown by the Aryans (who became the Kshatriyas) in 10,000 BC.

His book tells of Agartha's rise and fall. The tale of Agartha has few commonalities with actual Indian mythology and many similarities to the contemporary theories on prehistory and Norse mythology, such as "Agartha" as a corruption of "Asgard". Asgartha was said to have been destroyed in 5000 BC, shortly before the beginning of the Kali Yuga, by Ioda and Skandeh, invading brothers from the Himalayas. The destroyers were driven out by the Brahmins and fled north, where they became the Norse and were supposedly the namesakes of Odin and Scandinavia.

=== Mission de l'Inde en Europe and the idea of an underground Agartha ===
Les fils de Dieu was popular in France, giving the Agartha concept widespread exposure. Shortly after, Ernest Renan, likely influenced by Jacolliot, wrote about a Nordic Asgaard in Central Asia. The next large step in the development of the Agartha concept came in 1886, when the French occultist Alexandre Saint-Yves d'Alveydre wrote Mission de l'Inde en Europe, lit. 'Indian Mission to Europe'. He published it with his own money; the first edition was labeled the third, a common marketing practice at the time. Less than two weeks later, he had all but two copies (one for himself and one secretly kept by the printer) recalled and destroyed, apparently worried he had said too much about Agartha. Some sources say his informants in India threatened to kill him for exposing Agarthan secrets. In 1910, after his death, the book was reissued.

Saint-Yves was introduced to the idea of Agartha by a man named Haji Sharif or Hardjji Scharipf, who taught him Sanskrit. Saint-Yves said Sharif was a "high official of the Hindu church", though he had a name more commonly associated with Muslims; he may have actually been from Albania. His origins are largely unknown, and his later life is a mystery. Sharif was a Sanskritist and claimed knowledge of Agartha, which he said still existed. With the idea of Agartha, he also taught Saint-Yves its supposed language and alphabet, Vattanian or Vattan. Vattanian was actually created by Sharif. Jacolliot's influence on Saint-Yves's story is unknown, as Sharif likely introduced him to the concept; Sharif and Saint-Yves later had a dispute, and Saint-Yves claimed to have used astral projection to learn more. The narrative has many commonalities with Jacolliot's original, but with additional concepts from the Mahatma Letters in Theosophy and the novel Vril.

Saint-Yves described Agartha as an underground city with millions of inhabitants, ruled by a very powerful figure, the Sovereign Pontiff, of Ethiopian origin, like the Brahmatma. The pontiff had magical powers and advanced technology and was assisted by the Mahatma and the Mahanga. Unlike Jacolliot, Saint-Yves claimed that Agartha still existed underground, having moved there at the beginning of Kali Yuga 3,200 years earlier. Agartha keeps constant tabs on the surface, is far more advanced technologically, and maintains the supposedly ideal Synarchy form of government lost by the surface since the dissolution of the "Universal Empire" in 4000 BC. In this version, Agartha sends emissaries to the surface and has knowledge and secrets the surface lacks. When the surface world advances sufficiently, Agartha will be revealed and share its secrets and treasures. In his book, Saint-Yves encourages heads of state to use their powers to bring this about.

Saint-Yves's version of the story became the most popular and influential. Though his book was not republished until after his death, he alluded to Agartha in many other works. The idea of Agartha spread through the popularity of Saint-Yves's works among Martinists, but for a time was popular only among a few Paris-based occultists. Theosophy was gaining popularity at this time, and for some anti-Theosophists the idea of Agartha was used to counter Theosophy.

=== Later representations ===
Influenced by Saint-Yves, probably due to Martinist influence, the Polish explorer Ferdynand Ossendowski wrote of Agartha, spelling it Agharti, in his 1922 book about his adventures across the world, Beasts, Men and Gods, saying he had heard of it in Mongolia. According to Ossendowski, Agharti had 800 million people and in 2029 would invade the surface. Its residents spoke Vattanan, and were led by the Brahytma (the "King of the World"), the Mahytma, and the Mahynga.

Ossendowski's version was influenced by Saint-Yves to an extent some scholars say borders on plagiarism. Ossendowski denied that he had read Mission de l'Inde en Europe or even heard of Saint-Yves before writing his book. His book was extremely successful and popularized the idea of Agartha outside Martinist circles. Ossendowski's version is more or less its final form and the one most typically seen.

René Guénon expands on Ossendowski's idea in his book Le Roi du Monde, which uses it to explore Agartha's mythic and metaphysical aspects. He connects Agartha to Rosicrucianism. Guénon claimed that other unnamed Central Asian sources also told of Agartha. He portrayed it as the world's spiritual center, ruled by the King of the World. He is ambivalent on whether the idea is historically and factually true. His circle was interested in Agartha, and one of his associates, believing herself to be in contact with the Pontiff, claimed to have founded a secret society called Agartha 8.

The idea spread through outlets like the magazine Amazing Stories, which in the 1940s published several science fiction stories about Agartha. Esotericist and ufologist Robert Ernst Dickhoff's 1951 book Agharta is probably based on the Amazing Stories iterations. Dickhoff depicts Agartha as "the Holy abode of the Buddhist world, located in the Sangpo Valley, China", originally colonized by Martians. He was an associate of Om Cherenzi-Lind, who claimed to be the reincarnation of "Koot Hoomi, Regent of Agartha". Cherenzi-Lind differentiated Agartha from Agarthi.

Hollow earth theorist Walter Siegmeister (writing as Raymond Bernard) wrote on Agartha and is likely the reason for its association with hollow Earth theories. French writer and former Vichy collaborator Robert Charroux wrote on Agartha, as did esoteric fascist Miguel Serrano, who portrayed Agartha and Shambhala as the reestablishment of Hyperborea. Fascist writer Wilhelm Landig, in his book series about Agartha, coined the "black sun" symbol. Other writers later identified this as an SS floor tile. Some conspiracist writers claimed Agartha was connected to Heinrich Himmler's Nazi expeditions to Tibet in the 1930s.

Jean-Claude Frére's 1974 book Nazisme et sociétés secretes presents another version of the story. In it, Agartha was founded about 6,000 years ago in the area that is now the Gobi Desert, after Hyperborea was made uninhabitable. It became a sort of world center and was a powerful civilization for 2,000 years. Then Hyperborea and Agartha were struck down in a mysterious cataclysm, but managed to survive underground, where important figures (among them Jesus, Pythagoras, and Apollonius of Tyana) went to receive orders from the "Masters of the World". The "Aryan people" split, some trying to return to Hyperborea and others founding another secret civilization in Himalayan caves: Shambhala, with Shambhala representing the left-hand path as the "Wheel of the Black Sun" and Agartha the right-hand "Wheel of the Golden Sun", maintaining the "vril force". Frére falsely claims that this was official Nazi doctrine, but it was popular with some in the Thule Society.

Agartha is the subject of Afrika Bambaataa's 1998 song "Agharta (City of Shamballa)". Its video, directed by Daniel P. Siegler, depicts a future Earth with an uninhabitable surface and most people living in slavery in concentration camps until emissaries of Agartha free them. Dwight York's book on Agartha mimics this video.

In the 2020s, the concept of Agartha became an Internet meme. The meme version typically draws from the esoteric neo-Nazi and Hollow Earth versions of the mythology, featuring Nordic-looking people and ufological elements. Many of the memes are explicitly racist and antisemitic, and overlap with searches for Hyperborea, "vril", and Nazi UFOs. The memes often portray Agartha as an "aesthetic" that features images and references to "Aryan" white supremacist ideology spread either explicitly or through coded dog whistles.

== See also ==
- Esoteric neo-Nazism – Mystical interpretations and adaptations of Nazism
- Hades – God of the underworld in Greek mythology
- Xibalba – Underworld in Kʼicheʼ Maya mythology
