= Vril Society =

Alleged German secret society

The Vril Society was a fictitious secret society that is said to have existed in Germany in the early to mid-twentieth century. A series of conspiracy theories and pseudohistorical texts, starting with The Morning of the Magicians (1960), claim that it was involved in the rise of Nazism and used supernatural energies to develop innovative flying machines during the Nazi era or "Reichsflugscheiben".

There is no historical evidence that this was the name of a secret society, nor for the achievements attributed to it; however historian Nicholas Goodrick-Clarke acknowledged the existence of a small group that actually believed in the so-called vril energy, but he denied it played a significant political role, while Giorgio Galli, although believing the legends surrounding it to be exaggerated, pays close attention to the Vril Society, which he considers historically documented and significant for its occult influences on nazism.

The term Vril was coined by the English writer Edward Bulwer-Lytton (1803–1873) for his novel The Coming Race (1871), and likely derives from the Latin term virilis (manly, powerful). Bulwer-Lytton used the term for a supposed vital energy which grants its users with telepathy, telekinesis, and a number of other abilities.

== Background ==
=== The novel The Coming Race and the term Vril ===
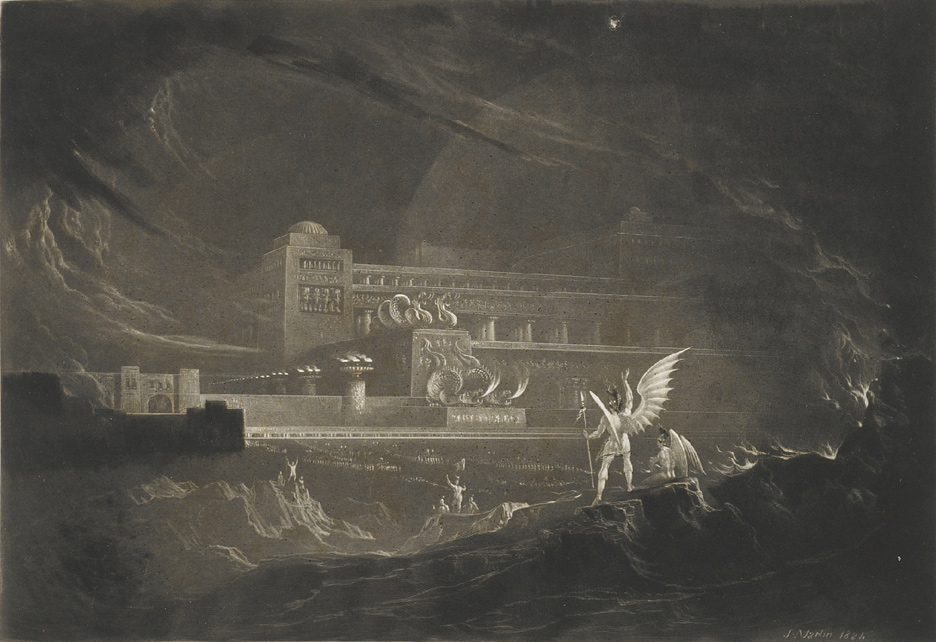
John Martin (1789–1854): Pandemonium, In The Coming Race the architecture of the Vril-ya is compared with John Martin's paintings

The word Vril comes from the novel The Coming Race published in 1871 by the English writer Edward Bulwer-Lytton (1803–1873) and was probably derived from the Latin word virilis (manly', 'powerful'). In this novel, the narrator encounters a subterranean race of humanoids with batracian partial ancestry, the Vril-Ya, who possess a psychic vital energy called Vril that is far superior to that of the human race. The Vril powers enable them to use telepathy and telekinesis and allow them to influence any form of animate or inanimate matter to heal, to resurrect the dead or to destroy. Originally a people who lived on the surface of the earth, the Vril-ya were cut off from the rest of humanity by a natural disaster and moved into an underground cave system where they found a new home. There, in a history marked by wars and social upheaval, they eventually evolved into an egalitarian society practicing eugenics, superior to all other races, through the discovery of a new force of nature - the Vril Force. Through contact with the novel's narrator, the Vril-ya learn about the humans living on the surface of the Earth and question him in detail about human society. The narrator manages to escape from the realm of the Vril-ya and at the end of the novel he warns his readers of the danger that the Vril-ya would pose to humanity if they were ever to return to the surface.

=== Vril in Theosophy and popular theories ===
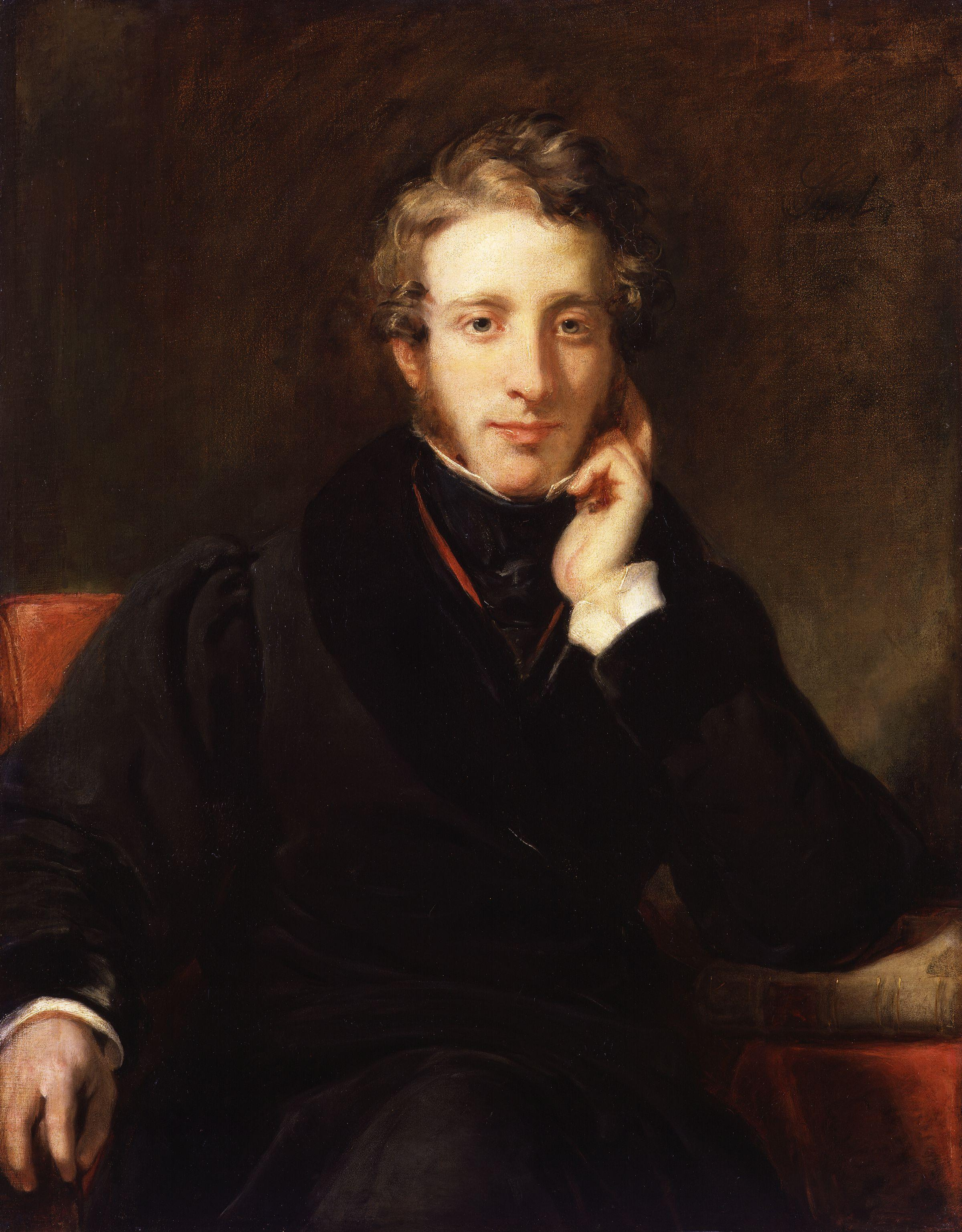
Edward Bulwer-Lytton, 1. Baron Lytton

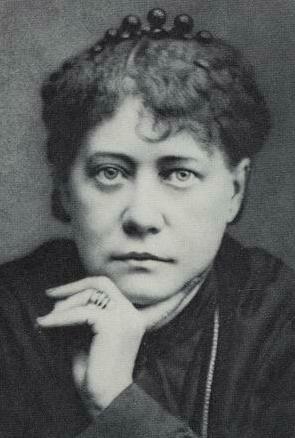
Helena Blavatsky

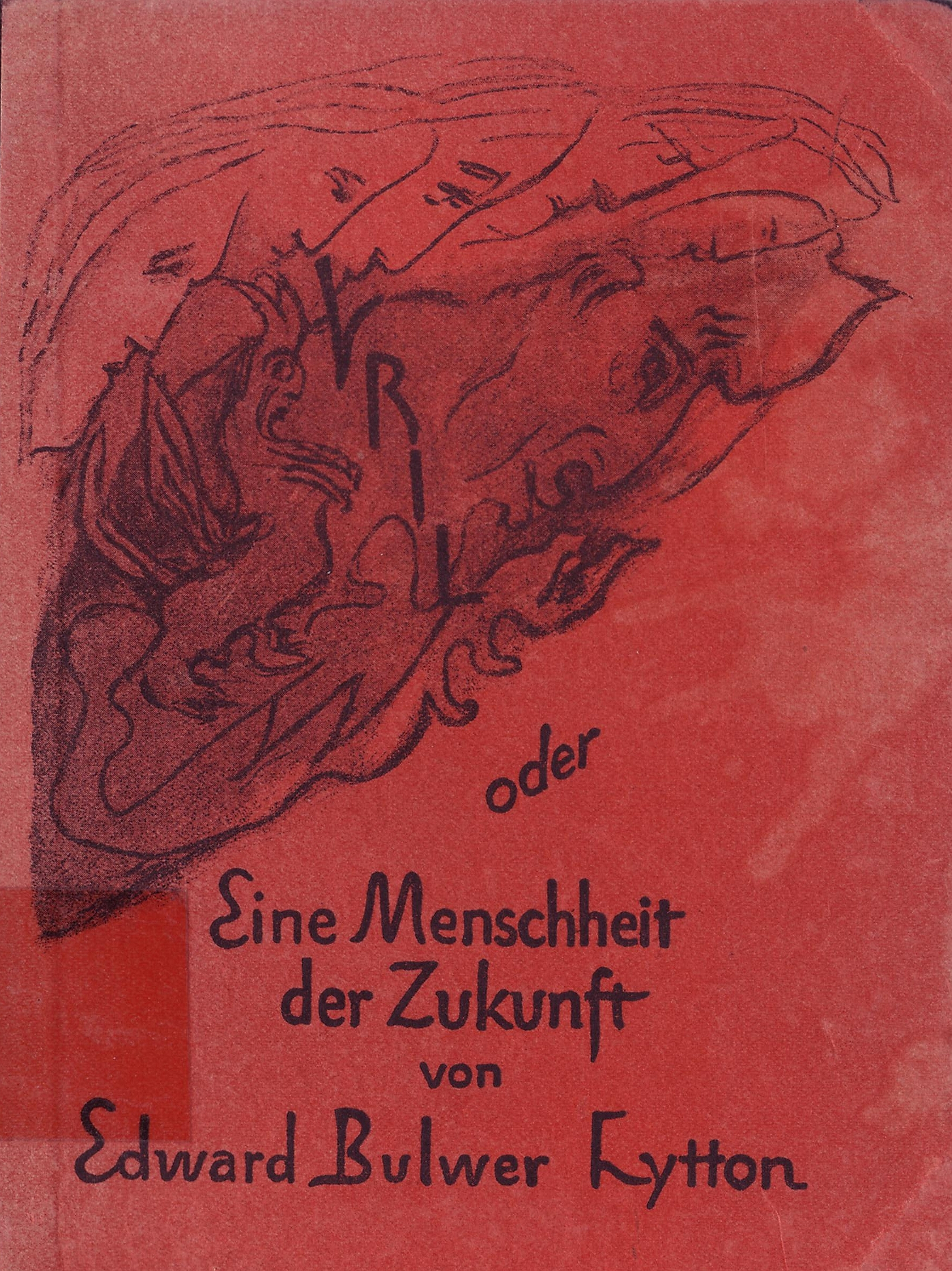
German edition, 1922

While contemporary critics saw The Coming Race as satire, other sections of the public regarded it as an occultist roman à clef. In these circles, the view was held that Bulwer-Lytton was a member of the Rosicrucians and that the "Vril" force was an actually existing universal life force. According to this view, the novel was merely a vehicle with which Bulwer-Lytton wanted to communicate secret knowledge to his readers under the guise of anonymity.

Helena Blavatsky and other occult authors adopted the term "Vril" as a synonym for secret natural forces that could only be used by magic. In Blavatsky's first work Isis unveiled (1877), Vril was portrayed as a real, independent force.

In her second book The Secret Doctrine in 1888, she described how the inhabitants of Atlantis had used Vril to build colossal structures. After the fall of Atlantis, a small group of surviving priests would have preserved this knowledge and only passed it on to a select few. This psychic energy should therefore allow the mastery of all of nature. Several books mention a Vril-ya Club founded in London in 1904, which is said to have addressed this issue. Bulwer-Lytton's writings are passed on in the New Thought movement.

It was particularly momentous that the theosophist William Scott-Elliot described the vril in his 1896 pamphlet The Story of Atlantis in connection with airships, which it served as the driving force behind. This characteristic of the vril, already described in The Coming Race, became a main reference for certain developments after World War II due to Scott-Elliot's explicit Atlantis association.

=== The further reception ===
As early as the mid-1890s, new scientific discoveries, such as the discovery of X-rays, led to the widespread view, even among intellectuals, that science could not yet claim to have finally solved the world's mysteries and that invisible natural forces and energies still existed. Occult theories were not only cited as counter-concepts to natural science, but common thematic points of contact were also identified. Many occult circles responded to the unease caused by the materialism of scientific and technological modernity by attempting to formulate a doctrine of the control of earthly and cosmic forces that was on a par with the natural sciences.

Around 1900, the fields of occultism and mysticism experienced a great upswing that lasted until the 1930s. As Theosophy was widespread at this time of the revival of occult movements, the "Vril" concept was also familiar in occult circles in Germany. Bulwer-Lytton's primal force appeared above all in contexts involving the creation of a "magic technique", whose designs expressed the desire for a unification of science and religion. A total of four translations of Bulwer-Lytton's book were published in Germany between 1874 and 1924, including one, which Anthroposophist Guenther Wachsmuth at the request of Rudolf Steiner. The term "Vril" therefore became known to a wider public in Germany until the 1920s. As a result, lay theories flourished, claiming to be able to fill alleged gaps in the sciences, without taking into account that Bulwer-Lytton only wanted to write an entertainment novel in the style of Jules Verne.

== Development and content of the legends about the Vril societies ==
=== Historical templates ===
Before World War II, there was at least one private circle in Berlin whose members were explicitly involved with the "Vril" force. The few sources that prove the existence of this circle of people later became one of the starting points for the creation of the Vril society legend.

==== The "truth society" ====
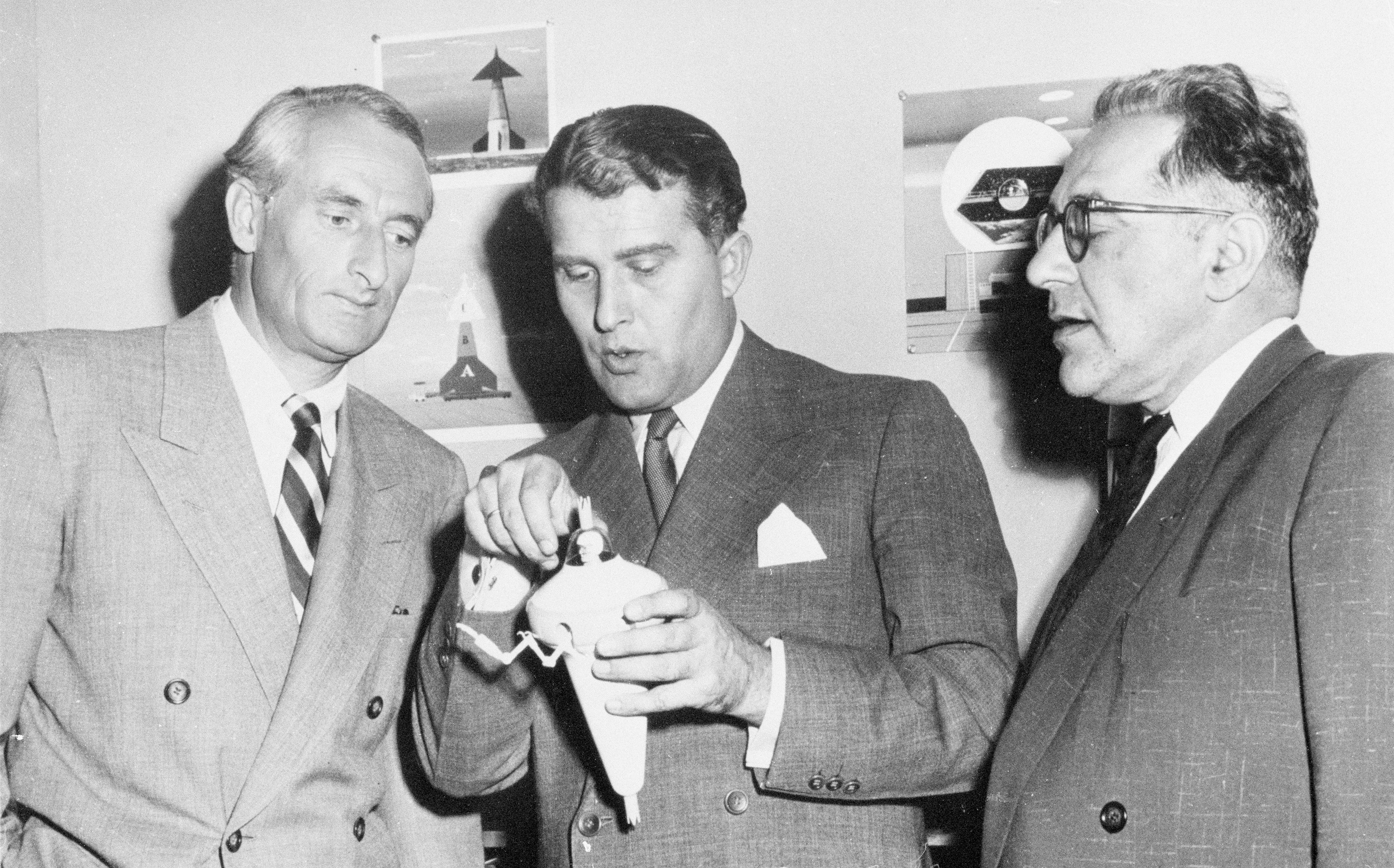
Willy Ley (right) in conversation with Wernher von Braun and Heinz Haber, 1954

One of the sources of evidence for the existence of such a group is an article by the German rocket pioneer Willy Ley, which he published in 1947 in the American science fiction magazine Astounding Science Fiction. In it, he attempts to explain to his readers why National Socialism was able to fall on fertile ground in Germany and attributes this to the great popularity of irrational beliefs in pre-war Germany. He describes various examples of pseudoscience and esoteric currents and in this context also mentions what he sees as a particularly peculiar group:

"The next group was literally based on a novel. This group, which I believe was called the Truth Society and was more or less based in Berlin, devoted their spare time to the search for Vril. Yes, their beliefs were based on Bulwer-Lytton's The Coming Race. They knew the book was a fabrication, Bulwer-Lytton had used this artifice to tell the truth about this 'force'. Subterranean humanity was nonsense, Vril was not. Possibly it had enabled the British, who guarded it as a state secret, to build their colonial empire. Certainly the Romans possessed it, encased in small metal spheres that protected their homes and were referred to as lares. For reasons I could not see through, the secret of the Vril could be discovered by immersing oneself in contemplating the structure of an apple cut in half. No, I am not joking, this was what I was told with great solemnity and secrecy. Such a group actually existed; it even published the first issue of a magazine in which it proclaimed its credo. (I wished I'd kept some of these things, but as it was, I had enough books to smuggle out)."

==== "Reich working group 'The coming Germany'" ====
In 1930, two smaller pamphlets entitled Weltdynamismus were published and Vril. Die kosmische Urkraft, which were published by an occult circle that called itself the "Reichsarbeitsgemeinschaft 'Das kommende Deutschland'" (RAG).

In it, the RAG claimed to have an elaborate technology that was suitable for utilizing the "Vril" force. The structure and functional principle of the machine described and the political program outlined are almost identical in structure and content to a brochure published by two Austrian authors as early as 1928, which propagated a perpetuum mobile that the Austrian Karl Schappeller is said to have invented. The RAG plans only differ from this in a few details. Overall, the impression is created that this is an improved version of Schappeller's machine, the function of which is not explained in (pseudo-)physical terms, but in occult terms. In a longer section of one of the texts, the image of an apple cut in half is used as a model for the structure of the earth and its connection with the "space force". This and the contributions by proven Schappeller supporters suggest that it was primarily followers of the Austrian inventor who contributed to the RAG publications.

From another RAG publication, of the Zeitschrift für Weltdynamismus, it becomes clear that RAG was founded in Berlin in 1930 by a certain Johannes Täufer. Täufer was also responsible for the brochure "Vril". Die kosmische Urkraft, but nothing more is known about his person. The name is probably a pseudonym, and it has been suggested that it may have been the publisher Otto Wilhelm Barth, who had published two of the RAG publications. Fritz Klein, a patron of Schappeller whose writings were recommended by RAG, may also have been behind this.

==== Summary of the research situation ====
A comparison between Ley's memoirs and the contents of the RAG writings leads to the conclusion that the "Truth Society" and the RAG could actually have been the same group. However, it seems to have only had a short-term and marginal significance in the occult scene of the time. There is no evidence of RAG in official registers, nor are there any records of its publications at the time in the archives of the Otto Wilhelm Barth publishing house. No further issues of either the Zeitschrift für Weltdynamismus or the Archiv für Alchemistische Forschung, which was published jointly with it, appeared. No documents exist for the period after 1930 that prove RAG's continued existence or influence on other circles. Nor can RAG's claim that it possessed "Vril" technology be regarded as proof that it actually succeeded in using it. Above all, however, it does not seem to be relevant to the invention of a Vril company after 1945 whether Willy Ley had actually referred to RAG: as will become clear below, later authors were at best inspired by Ley's statements for their own fantasies. Nonetheless, this group later formed a central building block for justifying the legends of the secret activities of a "Vril Society" in Germany from the 1920s to the 1940s.

=== Origin of the legends ===
In the period after the Second World War, numerous conspiracy theory and pseudohistorical interpretations of the Third Reich developed. pseudo-historical interpretations of the Third Reich, in which occult elements played a central role. In this context, the "Vril" concept and the aforementioned references to occultist groups were also cited as historical evidence. The earliest reference to an alleged secret society with the name "Vril Society" can be found in a publication from 1960. Since then, the topic has been taken up again and again in several variations in conspiracy theory and esoteric literature. While the first versions of this legend still rejected National Socialism, more recent versions of the legend directly or indirectly serve a positive reinterpretation of the Third Reich.

==== Louis Pauwels and Jacques Bergier ====
The existence of a "vril society" was first claimed by the French authors Louis Pauwels and Jacques Bergier. In their book Le matin des magiciens (Departure into the third millennium), published in 1960, they represented the thesis that the Nazi leadership attempted to enter into alliances with supernatural powers. An occult secret society had played a central role in these efforts. Referring to the statements of Willy Ley and on the basis of research they had allegedly carried out themselves but not specified further, they claimed that this society had called itself the "Vril Society" or "The Lodge of the Brothers of the Light" (Luminous Lodge). The "Vril Society" maintained close contacts with the Theosophical Society, the Rosicrucians and in particular the Thule Society and was an important Nazi organization.

==== Criticism ====
The sect that Ley recalls bears only a superficial resemblance to the "Vril Society" of the book Dawn of the Third Millennium. The authors never provided further evidence for their far-reaching speculations, not even for the alleged names of this group. Their claims must therefore be classified as fictions. In addition, historical research came to the conclusion that the occult groups existing at the time (for example the Thule Society) did not exert any significant influence on Hitler and the NSDAP. Although connections between occult ideas and the world view of individual National Socialists (especially Himmler) can be proven, they do not support the thesis that these occult circles had a comprehensive, systematic influence on Hitler and the entire National Socialist leadership.

Pauwels and Bergier's book inspired other authors to speculate about the alleged role of the "Vril Society", such as J. H. Brennan or Trevor Ravenscroft.

==== Norbert Jürgen-Ratthofer / Ralf Ettl and Jan Udo Holey ====
In the 1990s, the legend of the "Vril Society" was further developed. Norbert Jürgen-Ratthofer and Ralf Ettl linked them in 1992 in their publication The Vril Project mit dem älteren Mythos der „NS-Flugscheiben". According to them, the "Vril Society" had developed from the Thule Society and pursued esoteric studies. In the early 1920s, the Aldebarans made telepathic contact with it and with an inner circle of the SS, through which they received plans to build a flying machine. In 1922, the "Vril Society" is said to have used this information to build a saucer-shaped flying ship, the so-called "Beyond Flying Machine". Through various intermediate steps, in which the Austrian inventor Viktor Schauberger is said to have been involved, this then allegedly led to the construction of a version ("V7"), in which members of the "Vril Society" are said to have traveled to Aldebaran in 1945. In addition, further saucer-shaped aircraft (with names such as "Vril" and "Haunebu") were allegedly developed, with the help of which members of the Vril Society and the SS finally set off for Antarctic New Swabia in 1945.

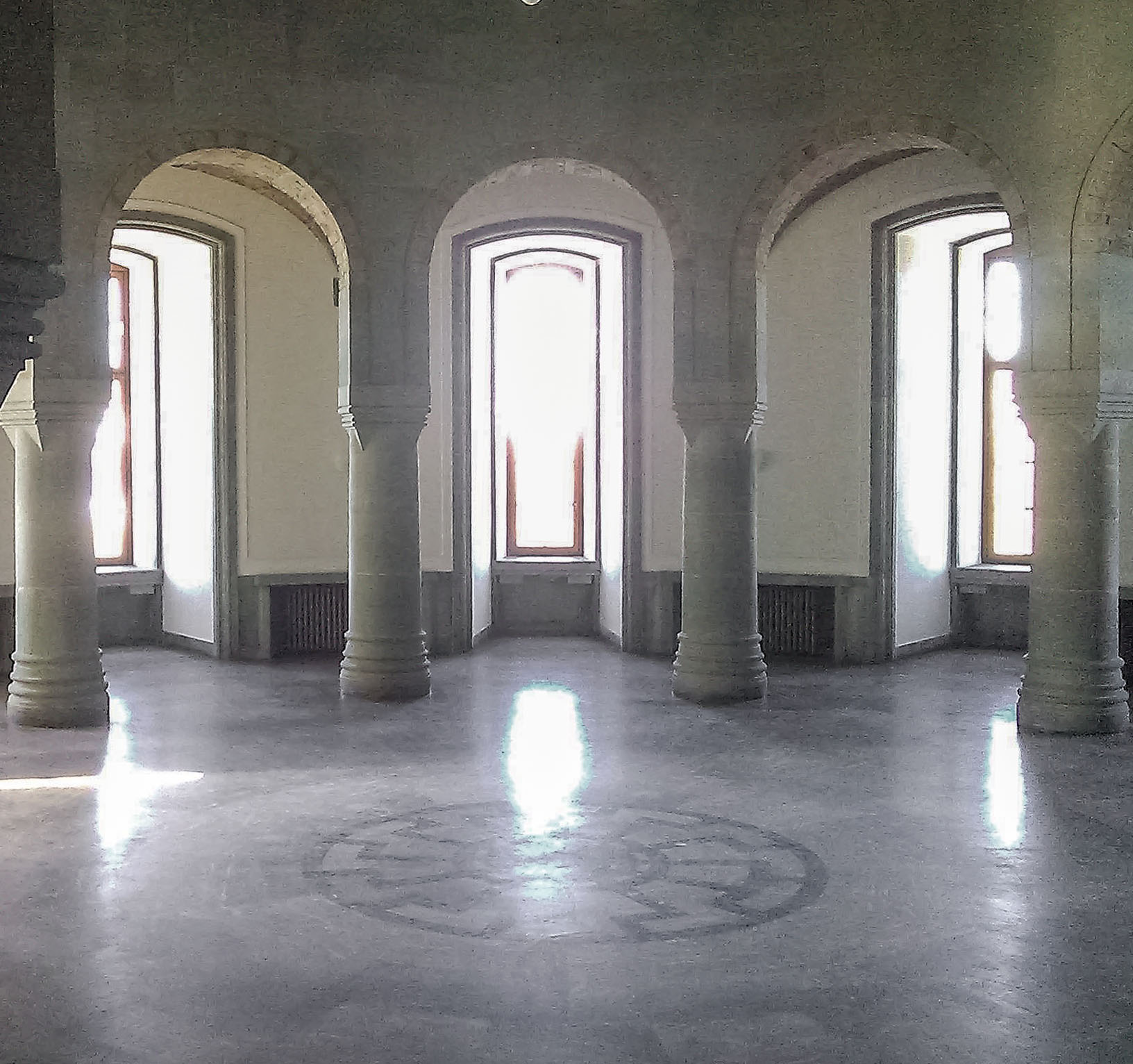
The former "Obergruppenführersaal" in Wewelsburg Castle; in the middle of the hall is an ornament called the "Black Sun".

Jürgen-Ratthofer and Ettl were members of the so-called Tempelhof Society, which had been active since the 1980s under the aegis of its "grand commander" Hans-Günter Fröhlich. The Tempelhof Society brought out several small publications and organized regular meetings that demonstrated its connections to the German-speaking right-wing extremist network of the time. The first comprehensive publication of the Tempelhof Society appeared in 1987 under the title Einblick in die magische Weltsicht und die magischen Prozesse (Insight into the magical world view and the magical processes). Excerpts from this publication and from articles in the right-wing extremist magazine CODE prove that an exchange took place between the members of the Tempelhof Society and the circle around Wilhelm Landig, which mainly revolved around the Sumerian/Babylonian origins of the Germans and the concept of the Black Sun. The publications of the Tempelhof Society were instrumental in linking this esoteric concept of the Black Sun, which had been discussed in the circle around Landig since the 1950s.

The text Das Vril-Projekt (The Vril Project), published by the Tempelhof Society, was originally little known. The legend attracted greater attention when it was taken up by Jan Udo Holey and reached a wider readership through his books. Holey, who is associated with brown esotericism, published the book Geheimgesellschaften und ihre Macht im 20. Jahrhundert (Secret Societies and their Power in the 20th Century) in 1993 under the pseudonym "Jan van Helsing", which is said to have sold 100,000 copies by 1996 alone. In it, he reproduces the scenario by Jürgen-Ratthofer and Ettl, but without clearly identifying their authorship. Her writing is listed in Holey's bibliography, but there is no reference to her authorship in the relevant chapter. In his 1997 book Unternehmen Aldebaran, Holey repeated this scenario and expanded it with more extensive references to Nazi UFOs and secret bases in the Antarctic.

Variations of this legend can also be found in more recent publications by other authors, e.g. Heiner Gehring and Karl-Heinz Zunneck, in the Study Buddhism, in Arcanorum Causam Nostrum, with Armin Risi and not least Henry Stevens.

Other variations of the legend focus more strongly on the alleged role of a woman, who was already mentioned in 1992 in the Vril Project by Jürgen-Ratthofer and Ettl and also later at Holey was mentioned: a medium named Maria Oršić. According to the Vril Project, Maria Oršić from Zagreb (Croatia) was involved in the founding of the "Vril Society" and also established the spiritualist contact with the Aldebarans.

In a later text, which only circulates anonymously on the internet, the figure of Maria Oršić is transformed from a minor character into a central protagonist. This text claims that Maria Oršić, a native of Vienna, founded the "All German Society for Metaphysics" in Munich in 1919 or 1921, which was linked to the "Vril Society". According to this text, the originally only female members of this society were involved with magical energies that were connected to the "Vril force". The protest against the short hair fashion of the 1920s and the wearing of long hairstyles played an important role in connection with the use of these "vibrational magical" energies. These energies were also used to power so-called "otherworldly flying machines", in the construction of which they were involved. According to the text, the "Alldeutsche Gesellschaft für Metaphysik" later formed the "Antriebstechnische Werkstätten". There, other scientists and technicians, including a Munich professor named "W. O. Schumann", were involved in the development of Reichsflugscheibes and other armaments projects.

After the dissolution of the Tempelhof Society, Ralf Ettl founded the Causa Nostra circle of friends, which continues to disseminate such ideas to this day, sometimes in a modified form. Causa Nostra also maintains links with the Swiss publisher Unitall, whose publications incorporate the ideas of the Tempelhof Society / Causa Nostra in the form of novels and non-fiction books.

==== Criticism ====
The myth of the Nazi UFOs arose independently of the aforementioned authors and was essentially inspired by the writings of Miguel Serrano, Ernst Zündel and Wilhelm Landig. The graphic representations of German flying disks circulating today are mostly based on drawings that were distributed in the 1980s by Ralf Ettl's Abraxas Videofilm Produktionsgesellschaft mbH and first published by D. H. Haarmann and O. Bergmann. The drawings were apparently inspired by the photos in George Adamski's UFO classics.

There is a complete lack of verifiable evidence for the scenarios described; the books contain only a few illustrations of questionable origin. There is no substantiated evidence for the references to the groups discussed above or to real people from contemporary history. The authors refer to messages transmitted by the media and anonymous informants (cf. e.g.), that defy all scrutiny. The topic seems to be particularly well received in circles of right-wing esotericism or esoteric neo-Nazism. A characteristic feature of this trend, which has been observable for some years now, is that the "Third Reich" is being reinterpreted and positively valorized from the perspective of esoteric world views. Concepts originally developed there, such as the Black Sun, have now also had a significant influence on popular culture outside these circles, as can be seen in computer games such as Wolfenstein.

No reputable sources were provided on the life and work of Maria Oršić and the members of the society she allegedly led. Nevertheless, in the wake of the publications of the "right-wing extremist esotericist" Jan Udo Holey wrote a series of neo-pagan and, in part, neo-Nazi publications, secret societies, as well as a novel based on facts about the life and work of Maria Oršić and the "Vril Society".

Not least through a publication by the authors Peter Bahn and Heiner Gehring, in which an attempt was made to support the concept of a "primal energy" underlying all other forms of energy by referring to the historical tradition of this concept, the topics of "Vril" power and "Vril society" also attracted attention in those circles that believe in the reality of so-called "free energy". However, the "Vril" concept was also used by representatives of "brown esotericism" for a positive reinterpretation of the "Third Reich". For example, references to Bahn and Gehring's interpretation of the RAG can be found in the publications of the Sonnenwacht association, which, according to critics, "uses neo-pagan esotericism as a cover for right-wing extremism".

== Literature ==
=== Literature on the background and criticism of the legends ===
- Baker, Alan (2000). Invisible Eagle: The History of Nazi Occultism. London: Virgin Books. ISBN 978-1-85227-863-2.
- H. T. Hakl: Nationalsozialismus und Okkultismus. In: Nicholas Goodrick-Clarke: Die okkulten Wurzeln des Nationalsozialismus. Marix-Verlag, Wiesbaden 2004, ISBN 3-937715-48-7, S. 194–217. (dt. Übers.; engl. Originaltitel: The occult roots of nazism.)
- Cis van Heertum: . Exploring alchemy in the early 20th century. Exploring alchemy in the early 20th century, part 1 und Exploring alchemy in the early 20th century, part 2. ritmanlibrary.com, 2006
- Goodrick-Clarke, Nicholas (2004). Die okkulten Wurzeln des Nationalsozialismus. Wiesbaden: Marix-Verlag. ISBN 3-937715-48-7. (New edition of the first German-language edition from 1997)
- Nicholas Goodrick-Clarke: Black Sun: Aryan Cults, Esoteric Nazism and the Politics of Identity. New York UP, New York 2002, ISBN 0-8147-3124-4, deutsch: Im Schatten der „Schwarzen Sonne". Arische Kulte, esoterischer Nationalsozialismus und die Politik der Abgrenzung. Marix, Wiesbaden 2009
- Galli, Giorgio (2012). Hitler and magical Nazism (in Italian). Milan: Bur. ISBN 9788858628478.
- Julian Strube: Die Erfindung des esoterischen Nationalsozialismus im Zeichen der Schwarzen Sonne. In: Zeitschrift für Religionswissenschaft, 20/2, 2012, p. 223–268.
- Julian Strube: Vril. Eine okkulte Urkraft in Theosophie und esoterischem Neonazismus. Wilhelm Fink Verlag, München/Paderborn 2013, ISBN 978-3-7705-5515-4.

=== Texts in which variants of the legend are represented by the Vril Society ===
- Peter Bahn, Heiner Gehring: Der Vril-Mythos. Omega Verlag, Düsseldorf 1997, ISBN 3-930243-03-2
- Heiner Gehring, Karl-Heinz Zunneck: Flugscheiben über Neuschwabenland. Die Wahrheit über „Vril", „Haunebu" und die Templer-Erbengemeinschaft. Jochen Kopp Verlag, Rottenburg 2005, ISBN 3-938516-00-3
- Jan van Helsing: Geheimgesellschaften und ihre Macht im 20. Jahrhundert oder wie man die Welt nicht regiert: Ein Wegweiser durch die Verstrickungen von Logentum mit Hochfinanz und Politik; Trilaterale Kommission, Bilderberger, CFR, UNO. Ewert, Rhede (Ems) 1993, ISBN 3-89478-069-X
- Jan van Helsing: Unternehmen Aldebaran. Kontakte mit Menschen aus einem anderen Sonnensystem. Ewertverlag, Lathen (Ems) 1997, ISBN 3-89478-220-X
- Norbert Jürgen-Ratthofer, Ralf Ettl: Das Vril-Projekt. Der Endkampf um die Erde. Wien, STM-Tempelhof, 1992 (The typeface was never published by a publishing house. A typescript is circulating on the Internet and by mail order)
- Louis Pauwels, Jacques Bergier: Le matin des magiciens: introduction au realisme fantastique. Gallimard, Paris 1960 german: Aufbruch ins dritte Jahrtausend. Von der Zukunft der phantastischen Vernunft. Wilhelm Heyne Verlag, München 1976, ISBN 3-453-00638-0 (Unaltered paperback edition of the first German-language edition from 1962)
- Sven Peters: Verschwiegene Existenz-Leben der Maria Ortisch. Argo Verlag, ISBN 978-3-937987-45-3
- Trevor Ravenscroft: Der Speer des Schicksals. Die Geschichte der heiligen Lanze.: Universitas, München 1988, ISBN 3-8004-1166-0
- Armin Risi: Machtwechsel auf der Erde: Die Pläne der Mächtigen, globale Entscheidungen und die Wendezeit. 5. Auflage. Govinda, Zürich 2006, ISBN 3-906347-81-8
- Henry Stevens: Hitler's flying saucers. A Guide to German Flying Discs of the Second World War. Adventures Unlimited Press, Kempton IL 2003, ISBN 1-931882-13-4

=== Historical sources used to construct the legend ===
- Edward Bulwer-Lytton: The Coming Race. Edinburgh 1871
- Edward Bulwer-Lytton: Das kommende Geschlecht. Deutscher Taschenbuch-Verlag, München 1999, ISBN 3-423-12720-1
- Reichsarbeitsgemeinschaft "Das kommende Deutschland" (ed.): Weltdynamismus. Streifzüge durch technisches Neuland anhand biologischer Symbole. Otto Wilhelm Barth Verlag, Berlin 1930 (Deutsche Nationalbibliothek Leipzig, Sig.: 1930 A 3927)
- Johannes Täufer: „Vril". Die kosmische Urkraft. Wiedergeburt von Atlantis. Hrsg. im Auftrag der Reichsarbeitsgemeinschaft „Das kommende Deutschland". Astrologischer Verlag Wilhelm Becker, Berlin 1930 (Deutsche Nationalbibliothek Leipzig, Sig.: 1930 A 5652), archive. org
- Otto Wilhelm Barth (Ed.): Zeitschrift für Weltdynamismus. In: Archiv für Alchemistische Forschung (Alchemistische Blätter, Band 2). Band 2, Heft 2, Otto Wilhelm Barth Verlag, Berlin 1930 (Zeitschriftendatenbank der Deutschen Nationalbibliothek, ID: 526573-3)
- Willy Ley: Pseudoscience in Naziland. In: Astounding Science Fiction. 39/3, Mai 1947, p. 90–98 (Zeitschriftendatenbank der Deutschen Nationalbibliothek, ID: 84450-0)
