= Monast =

Monast is a surname. Notable people with the surname include:

- Louis Monast (1863–1936), American politician
- Serge Monast (1945–1996), Québécois investigative journalist, poet, essayist, and conspiracy theorist
