= William Guy Carr =

Naval officer and author

- Born: 2 June 1895; Formby, Lancashire, England
- Died: 2 October 1959 (aged 64); Ontario, Canada
- Military career
- Branch: Royal Canadian Navy
- Rank: Commander
- Conflicts: World War I World War II

William James Guy Carr (R.D. Commander R.C.N. (R)) (2 June 1895 – 2 October 1959) was an English-born Canadian naval officer, author and conspiracy theorist.

Though he first came to notice with books about his military experiences as a submariner, Carr later turned to writing about a vast conspiracy, which he alleged to have uncovered. He was described as "the most influential source in creating the American Illuminati demonology", according to the American folklorist Bill Ellis.

In the 1950s, he was the leader of the anticommunist National Federation of Christian Laymen of Toronto, Ontario. He was also one of the directors of the Naval Club of Toronto.

== Early life ==
Born in Formby (Lancashire, England), Carr was educated in Scotland and went to sea at the age of 14.

== Government career ==
=== Navy ===
He served as navigating officer of His Majesty's Ship Submarines during World War I.

In World War II, he was naval control officer for the St. Lawrence, staff officer operations at Shelburne, Nova Scotia, and then senior naval officer at Goose Bay, Labrador.

As an officer on the staff of Commodore Reginald W. Brock, he organized the 7th Victory Loan for the 22 Royal Canadian Naval Training Divisions.

=== Intelligence ===
Carr also worked for the Canadian Intelligence Service during World War II, and in 1944 he published Checkmate in the North, a book about an invasion by the Axis forces to take place in the area of the CFB Goose Bay.

== Political activism ==
In 1931, he started giving conferences in different Canadian clubs on the topic of "International conspiracy," which was subdivided in two main subjects: "International communism" and "International capitalism," stating that both were being controlled by the Illuminati and what he called the "international bankers." The last, according to Carr, are represented mainly by the Rothschild and the Rockefeller families.

In the 1950s, after he retired from the Navy, Carr's writings turned essentially to conspiracy themes from a firmly Protestant standpoint.

External audio
- Pawns in the Game lecture by William Guy Carr (1958)

According to Political Research Associates, a group studying right-wing extremism:

Carr promoted the anti-Semitic variant on conspiracism with books such as Pawns in the Game and Red Fog over America. Carr believes that an age-old Jewish Illuminati banking conspiracy used radio-transmitted mind control on behalf of Lucifer to construct a one world government. The secret nexus of the plot was supposedly the international Bilderberger meetings on banking policy. The anti-Semitic Noontide Press distributed Pawns in the Game for many years.

Carr's works were influenced by the writings of Nesta Webster and the French hoaxer Léo Taxil (see Taxil hoax). He also referred to the theories of Augustin Barruel and John Robison, who both explained the French Revolution as a plot by Freemasonry and linked to the German Illuminati of Adam Weishaupt, who is frequently associated to the conspiracy theory of the New World Order. According to the French philosopher and historian Pierre-André Taguieff, Carr's works, especially Pawns in the Game, "largely contributed to popularise the themes of anti-Masonic conspiracism in the United States and in Canada; first, it reached the Christian fundamentalist milieu (mainly concerned with his 'Luciferian' conspiracies), then the whole far-right movement and the new generations of conspiracy theorists."

Dan Brown, although he probably had his information from a different source, includes in his novel Angels & Demons an interpretation of the Illuminati by a US$1 bill and repeats the main arguments of Carr in Pawns in the Game.

Most of the first editions of Carr's book were published by the Federation of Christian Laymen (Toronto) of which he actually was the president. He directed the monthly anti-masonic newsletter of the association: News Behind the News (Willowdale, Toronto, Vol. 1, # 1, 1956-) in which he published numerous articles discussing the power of the Illuminati in US and world affairs. In that paper, Carr defended the strong anticommunism of Joseph McCarthy, a Wisconsin senator.

The political ideas of the Christian association were close to those of John Horne Blackmore, the first leader of the Social Credit Party of Canada, and Ron Gostick, another important member of that party. Carr's Federation was closely linked with the Californian Council of Christian Laymen (1949–1964), especially with Alfred Kohlberg, Edward Geary Lansdale, and Stan Steiner.

In the 1950s, both organisations fought communism and were involved in a campaign against water fluoridation.

== Death ==
Carr died in 1959 at the age of 64.

== Main observations ==
=== Three world wars ===
One of Carr's most-lasting contributions to modern conspiracy theories was his discussion of an alleged plan for three world wars, often referred as the 3WW, which he believed was developed by a Confederate general and Masonic scholar, Albert Pike.

In Pawns in the Game, Carr claimed that World War I had been fought to enable the Illuminati to overthrow the powers of the Russian tsar and to turn Russia into the stronghold of atheistic communism. The differences stirred up by the agents of the Illuminati between the British and the German Empires were used to foment the war. After the war ended, communism was bolstered to destroy other governments and weaken religions.

Later, he claimed that World War II had been fomented by using the differences between fascism and political Zionism and fought so that Nazism would be destroyed, the power of political Zionism increased, and the sovereign state of Israel could then be established in Palestine. During the war, international communism was built up until its strength equaled that of united Christendom. Then, it was contained and kept in check until required for the final social cataclysm.

Moving into the future, Carr claimed that a report came into his possession through the Canadian Intelligence Service of an alleged speech in 1952 by Rabbi Emanuel Rabinovich in which it was made known that the Secret Powers wished to precipitate World War III within five years. Small nations would ally with either Russia or the United States, with Israel remaining neutral. Rabinovich was quoted as saying that there would be no more white race and no more religions. Toward the end of the book, Carr states that "people who wish to remain free can follow only one plan of action. They must support Christianity against all forms of atheism and secularism."

Confusion has arisen as to the precise source of Carr's three world wars scenario. As is the case with many of his claims, Carr did not provide a source for that scenario, but he mentions a letter written by Pike and addressed to Italian revolutionary leader Giuseppe Mazzini, which outlined a plan for unleashing "Nihilists and Atheists" after the end of World War III. The confusion increased when Michael Haupt launched his website threeworldwars.com, which mistakenly assumed that Carr also attributed the World War Three scenario to the Pike letter. In fact, the authenticity of that letter is disputed.

Carr stated that he learned about the letter from the anti-Mason, Cardinal José María Caro Rodríguez of Santiago, Chile, the author of The Mystery of Freemasonry Unveiled (Hawthorne, California, Christian Book Club of America, 1971). However, Carr's later book, Satan, Prince of This World (written in 1959), included the following footnote: "The Keeper of manuscripts recently informed the author that this letter is NOT cataloged in the British Museum Library. It seems strange that a man of Cardinal Rodriguez's knowledge should have said that it WAS in 1925." More recently, the British Museum confirmed in writing to researcher Michael Haupt that such a document has never been in their possession. Pierre-André Taguieff states that Carr gave an ultimate and synthetic account of the "legend," which links together the Illuminati, Mazzini and Pike in a satanic plot for world domination.

=== Conspiracy of Synagogue of Satan ===
Carr's books often discuss a Luciferian conspiracy by what he called the "World Revolutionary Movement," but he later attributed the conspiracy more specifically to the "Synagogue of Satan." The term was not a reference to Judaism, Carr wrote: "I wish to make it clearly and emphatically known that I do not believe the Synagogue of Satan (S.O.S.) is Jewish, but, as Christ told us for a definite purpose, it is comprised of 'I know the blasphemy of them which say they are Jews, and are not, but are the synagogue of Satan.' (Rev. 2:9 and 3:9)"

The quote is taken from Satan, Prince of this World, the book that Carr was working on at the time of his death and which was edited by his elder son, W.J. Carr, Jr., and presented as the "last manuscript [of the author] exposing the Luciferian Conspiracy, Satanism, secret societies and the Synagogue of Satan as driving forces behind the World Revolutionary Movement." Carr's son also mentioned he did not publish some parts of the manuscript because many references were missing.

One of the most interesting things to note about Carr's Luciferian conspiracies is that he believed that they were already at work during Christ's time. As Taguieff points out, there is a transhistorical scheme in Carr's idea of world conspiracy. In that kind of philosophy of history anticipating a final "World Government," the Illuminati are part of a satanic historical force that contributes to the evil original plot. According to that point of view, Carr believed that there are "natural born" conspiracists, which is nothing more for Taguieff than myth and paranoia that was invented from a delirious worldview.

It was indeed an original aspect of Carr's theories, as most conspiracy theorists usually start their "genealogy" with the modern age, especially the French Revolution. As a Christian traditionalist, Carr believed that the world conspiracy is based on a Manichaean way of thinking, a view that is common to many antimasonic and anticommunist conspiracy theorists since Nesta Webster.

== Influence ==
The source of the plan for three world wars, has become a topic for discussion among fringe conspiracy investigators, and it is cited in seminal conspiracy books such as Des Griffin's Fourth Reich of the Rich (1976), who published the fourth edition of Pawns in the Game and a cassette tape of one of Carr's speeches in Chicago in his own publishing house, Emissary Publications (Colton, Oregon).

Carr also inspired Dan Smoot (The Invisible Government, 1962), Gary Allen (The Rockefeller File, 1976), Phoebe Courtney, (Beware Metro and Regional Government, 1973), Richard T. Osborne (The Great International Conspiracy, 1974; and lately The Coming of World War III, 2006), Myron C. Fagan, (Audio Document (LP): The Illuminati and The Council on Foreign Relations, recorded in 1967-1968, ed. by a group calling themselves the Sons of Liberty. Fagan outlines the Illuminati world elite plans of global conspiracy for the New World Order and world domination), David Icke (The Biggest Secret, 1999), Jan van Helsing, and the French-Canadian Social Credit Party member Serge Monast (1945–1996), who pretended to be Carr's disciple. All those plot theorists argue for the continuing influence of the Illuminati as Carr suggested it in his two main works.

The works of Carr and his influence among conspiracy investigators has been studied by the American historian Daniel Pipes (1997) and the folklorist Bill Ellis (2000). The French philosopher and historian Pierre-André Taguieff was paid to write La Foire aux illuminés: Ésotérisme, théorie du complot, extrémisme (2005) (The Illuminati fair: esotericism, plot theory, extremism) where he makes an analysis of Pawns in the Game. He claims that Carr belongs to a tradition of conspiracy investigator that goes far back to Augustin Barruel and is represented by the Protocols of the Elders of Zion, which frequently quoted in Carr's work, in the 20th century. Taguieff also studied Carr's theories in L'imaginaire du complot mondial: Aspects d'un mythe moderne (The world plot imaginary: about a modern myth), 2006.

Since 1998, Carr's most famous books (Pawns in the Game, The Conspiracy to Destroy All Existing Governments and Religions, and Satan, Prince of this World) were translated into French.

His French editor, Jacques Delacroix, is also a conspiracy investigator who counts himself as one of Carr's successors.

== Works ==
=== Books ===
- By Guess and By God: The Story of the British Submarines in the War. Preface by Admiral S.S. Hall. Garden City, N.Y.: Doubleday, Doran & Company, Inc. (1930); London: Hutchinson & Co. (1930).
  - À la grace de Dieu! Les sous-marins anglais dans la guerre mondiale (in French). Translated by P. Reymond. Paris: Payot (1931).
- Hell's Angels of the Deep. London: Hutchinson & Co. (1932); Toronto: S.B. Gundy and Oxford University Press (1933).
- High and Dry: The Post-War Experiences of the Author of "By Guess and By God". London: Hutchinson (1938).
- Brass Hats and Bell-Bottomed Trousers: Unforgettable and Splendid Feats of the Harwich Patrol ("By Guess and by God II"). London: Hutchinson & Co. (1939).
- Good Hunting ("By Guess and by God III"). London: Hutchinson & Co. (1940).
- Out of the Mists: Great Deeds of the Navy in the Last War and Her Role Today. London and New York: Hutchinson & Co. (1942).
- Checkmate in the North: The Axis Planned to Invade America. Toronto: The Macmillan Company of Canada Limited (1944). Army Museum Collection.
- One World in the Making: The United Nations. Boston: Ginn (1946).
- The Devil's Poison or "The Truth About Fluorine. Willowdale (Ontario): National Federation of Christian Laymen (NFCL) Publications Committee (1956).
- The Red Fog Over America. Willowdale (Ontario): National Federation of Christian Laymen (NFCL) Publications Committee (1955, 1957); Hollywood: Angriff Press (1956, 1957); Glendale, Calif.: St. George Press (1962 and 1968); The Britons (1962); Pinesdale, Mont.: Poor Richard’s Press (Oct. 1973) [5th ed.]; Legion for the Survival of Freedom Inc. (1978); TAB Books (1997).
- Pawns in the Game. Willowdale (Ontario): Gadsby-Leek Co. (1955); Willowdale (Ontario): National Federation of Christian Laymen (NFCL) Publications Committee (1956), includes 4 pages about the National Federation of Christian Laymen; Hollywood: Angriff Press (1958); Los Angeles: St. George Press (1958); Los Angeles: Christian Laymen (1958); Palmdale, Calif.: Omni Publications/Christian Book Clum (1960s); Glendale, Calif.: St. George Press (1962, 1967); Clackamas, OR: Emissary Publications (n.d.), reprint of 1958 ed.; Omni/Christian Book Club (1993); Boring, OR: CPA Book Publisher (2005); The Money Power: Empire of the City and Pawns in the Game. Progressive Press (2012). ISBN 1615771212.
  - (in French) translations: Des Pions sur l'échiquier. Éditions Delacroix (1999) [part of]; Cadillac (France), Éditions Saint-Rémi (2002). Arabic translation by Abdus-Samad Sharafuddin, Jeddah, OKAZ (1976).
- The International Conspiracy: The National Federation of Christian Laymen and What We Stand For, includes the "aims and objects" of the National Federation of Christian Laymen and a membership application form. With printed broadside letter from the World Federalists of Canada laid in, Toronto, National Federation of Christian Laymen (NFCL), [1956].
- Present Personal Income and Corporation Taxes Unconstitutional, Willowdale (Ontario), National Federation of Christian Laymen, [1956].
- The Conspiracy to Destroy all Existing Governments and Religions. Metairie, LA: Sons of Liberty (1960? written in 1958).
  - (in French) translation: La Conspiration mondiale dont le but est de détruire tous les gouvernements et religions en place, Châteauneuf (France), Éditions Delacroix, [1998]. Refers to: John Robison : Proofs of a Conspiracy Against All the Religions and Governments of Europe Carried on in the Secret Meetings of Freemasons, Illuminati and Reading Societies (1798).
- Satan, Prince of this World. Palmdale, Calif.: Omni Publications (1966); 1997 [post. 1st ed.; written in 1959]; (in French) translation: Satan, prince de ce monde. Cadillac (France): Éditions Saint-Rémi (2005).
- British Submarines in World War I. Allborough Publishing (1992).

=== Audio recordings ===
- Pawns in the Game lecture (1958). Cassette tape.

"100 minute recording of a speech given by Commander William Guy Carr in Chicago just before his death in 1959. Commander Carr, the famous author of Red Fog Over America & Pawns In The Game gives a comprehensive political and philosophical overview of the Illuminati-International Banker conspiracy to undermine all nations and create a one world government."

== See also ==
- Anti-Masonry
- Conspiracy theory
- Royal Navy Submarine Service
- Satanism
- Submarines of the Royal Navy

== Sources ==
- Michael Lind, Up From Conservatism: Why the Right is Wrong for America, New York, Free Press Paperbacks, 1997 (parts on W.G. Carr). ISBN 0-684-83186-4
- Bill Ellis, Raising the Devil: Satanism, New Religions, and the Media, University Press of Kentucky, 2000. ISBN 0-8131-2170-1
- Daniel Pipes, Conspiracy. How the Paranoid Style Flourishes and Where It Comes From, New York, Free Press, 1997 (partly studies Carr's National Federation of Christian Laymen). ISBN 0-684-87111-4
- "Dances with Devils: Satan, the Devil, and the Antichrist, Freemasons Jews and the Forged Protocols Variations on Conspiracist Themes", The Website of the Political Associates
- (in French) Pierre-André Taguieff, La Foire aux illuminés : Ésotérisme, théorie du complot, extrémisme ("The Illuminati fair: Esotericism, Plot Theory, Extremism"), Paris, Mille et une nuits, 2005. ISBN 2-84205-925-5
- (in French) Pierre-André Taguieff, L'imaginaire du complot mondial: Aspects d'un mythe moderne ("The World plot imaginary: about a modern myth"), Paris, Mille et une nuits, 2006. ISBN 2-84205-980-8
- John Winton (ed.), The Submariners: Life in British Submarines 1901-1999. An Anthology of Personal Experience, Trafalgar Square, 1999. ISBN 0-09-480220-3
- Terry Melanson, Albert Pike to Mazzini, August 15, 1871: Three World Wars?
- Margiotta Test extract from Margiotta in French, https://web.archive.org/web/20100909164911/http://www.theconspiracyexplained.com/IntroductionAmend.html
