= Hitler and the Occult =

1995 book by Ken Anderson

- Cover of the first edition
- Author: Ken Anderson
- Language: English
- Subject: Nazism and occultism
- Publisher: Prometheus Books
- Publication date: 1995
- Publication place: United States
- Media type: Print (hardcover)
- Pages: 244
- ISBN: 0-87975-973-9
- OCLC: 31901385
- Dewey Decimal: 943.086
- LC Class: DD247.H5 A8154 1995

Hitler and the Occult is a book about Nazi occultism by Ken Anderson. It was published by Prometheus Books in 1995. It focuses on the relationship between the worlds of Nazism and occultism and to what extent it actually existed; the author Anderson, a freelance journalist and researcher, took a skeptical view of the idea that it was a major influence on Nazism. There is a particular focus on debunking the claims of Trevor Ravenscroft in his 1972 book The Spear of Destiny. The book received mostly positive reviews.

== Background ==
The author, Ken Anderson, is an Australian freelance journalist and researcher. He had authored prior books, including Extraordinary Coincidences and Coincidences: Accident or Design?; he came at the material from a largely skeptical viewpoint. Hitler and the Occult was published in hardcover format by Prometheus Books in 1995. Its first edition was 244 pages long, with illustrations. A Japanese translation done by Norihide Sawada was published in 1997 by Arechi Shuppansha.

A National Geographic documentary loosely based on the book, titled Hitler and the Occult, premiered in 2007.

== Contents ==
The book analyzes claims related to the interplay between Nazism and occultism; a variety of myths and legends tied Nazism with the occult and mystical. Anderson has a particular focus on debunking the claims of Trevor Ravenscroft in his 1972 book The Spear of Destiny.

Anderson is largely skeptical of claims that there was a significance occult influence on the Nazis, including on Hitler himself. He acknowledges some connections, such as Heinrich Himmler's obsession with the occult, but said Hitler himself thought these were absurd. He notes the Thule Society was tied to Nazism, but argues that they were actually suppressed once Hitler rose to power; similarly, there is no evidence that Hitler ever saw the Holy Lance, or any evidence that his supposed favored astrologer ever met him. It lacks a bibliography but contains an index.

== Reception ==
Skeptic magazine described it as indicating that "most of these claims are highly exaggerated" and noted his skeptical viewpoint. Kendrick Frazier noted it as a critical assessment. Dennis Winters for Booklist called it a "much-needed debunking of these legends", and praised it for tracing these myths to their origins before debunking them; he said Anderson's main point was that "Hitler was in the grip not of any supernatural force, but of his own twisted mind. He was an opportunist who exploited the superstition of others to further his own lust for power and destruction." Nicholas Goodrick-Clarke and Raymond L. Sickinger noted it as critically examining the book The Spear of Destiny and the claims of Trevor Ravenscroft.

Scholar Peter Staudenmaier named it among a list of works on the subject of Nazism and occultism that were improved from the "extensive and largely trivial" and "decidedly inadequate works" on the topic, alongside Unholy Alliance by Peter Levenda and Invisible Eagle by Alan Baker, describing them as "thoughtful popular works that are less credulous though still derivative and excessively sensationalistic". Writer Stephen E. Flowers was more uncertain over the level of skepticism, saying he was less critical and more ambivalent over the relationship between occultism and Nazism. Flowers criticized Anderson for believing Hitler was incapable of understanding the occult; he described its tone as "journalistic and slightly sensationalistic". Gordon Stein found it to be a book "definitely worth reading" for dispelling myths about occultism and Nazism.
