= Elie Siegmeister =

American composer (1909–1991)

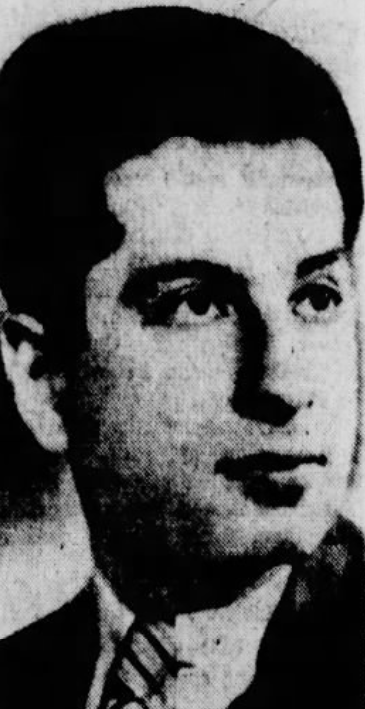
- Siegmeister in 1940
- Born: January 15, 1909; New York City, New York, U.S.
- Died: March 10, 1991 (aged 82); Manhasset, New York, U.S.
- Other name: L. E. Swift
- Relatives: Walter Siegmeister (brother)

Elie Siegmeister (also published under pseudonym L. E. Swift; January 15, 1909, in New York City – March 10, 1991, in Manhasset, New York) was an American composer, educator and author.

== Early life and education ==
Elie Siegmeister was born January 15, 1909, in New York City. Both parents were of Russian-Jewish ancestry. His father was a surgeon. His parents, William and Bessie Siegmeister, were both born in Russia. His older brother Walter Siegmeister was an esoteric writer and promoter of Hollow Earth theory and UFOs. The family moved to Brooklyn when Siegmeister was five, at which age he began piano lessons.

Siegmeister entered Columbia University at age 15, and he earned a B.A. cum laude at the age of 18; he had studied music theory with Seth Bingham. He studied conducting with Albert Stoessel at the Juilliard School and counterpoint with Wallingford Riegger. He was among the numerous American composers, including Aaron Copland and Virgil Thomson, who were students of the influential teacher Nadia Boulanger in Paris.

== Career ==
His varied musical output showed his concern with the development of an authentic American musical vocabulary. Jazz, blues and folk melodies and rhythms are frequent themes in his many song cycles, his nine operas, his eight symphonies, and his many choral, chamber, and solo works. His 37 orchestral works have been performed by leading orchestras throughout the world under such conductors as Arturo Toscanini, Leopold Stokowski, Dimitri Mitropoulos, Lorin Maazel, and Sergiu Comissiona. He also composed for Hollywood (notably, the film score of They Came to Cordura, starring Gary Cooper and Rita Hayworth, 1959) and Broadway (Sing Out, Sweet Land, 1944, book by Walter Kerr). During World War II, he used to compose lullabies for his three daughters while riding on the New York City subway.

His Western Suite was premiered by Toscanini and the NBC Symphony Orchestra during a broadcast concert on November 25, 1945, in NBC Studio 8-H. Maurice Abravanel and the Utah Symphony Orchestra later made a stereo recording of the music, which incorporates familiar cowboy tunes. Biographer Mortimer Frank said Toscanini's premiere (preserved on transcription discs) is a remarkable performance led by a conductor whose roots went not to the Old West but the Parma Conservatory.

Siegmeister wrote a number of important books on music, among them "Treasury of American Song" (Knopf, 1940–43, text coauthored with Olin Downs, music arranged by Siegmeister), second edition revised and enlarged (Consolidated Music Publishers); "The Music Lover's Handbook" (William Morrow, 1943; Book-of-the-Month Club selection), revised and expanded as "The New Music Lover's Handbook" (1973); and the two-volume "Harmony and Melody" (Wadsworth, 1985), which was widely adopted by college and conservatory curricula. In 1960, Siegmeister also recorded and released an instructional album of music, Invitation to Music, on Folkways Records, on which he discusses the fundamentals of music.

From 1977 until his death, he served on the board of directors of ASCAP and chaired its Symphony and Concert Committee. Among his signal achievements, he was composer-in-residence at Hofstra University 1966–76, having organized and conducted the Hofstra Symphony Orchestra; established 1971 and chaired the Council of Creative Artists, Libraries, and Museums; and initiated 1978 the Kennedy Center's National Black Music competition. In 1939, he organized the American Ballad Singers, pioneers in the folk music renaissance whom he conducted for eight years in performances throughout the United States. He was the winner of numerous awards and commissions, among them those of the Guggenheim, Ford, and Elizabeth Sprague Coolidge Foundations, the Library of Congress, the National Endowment for the Arts, and the United States Information Agency.

== Notable students ==
The best known of his own students were Stephen Albert (1941–92), winner of a 1985 Pulitzer Prize for music, Leonard Lehrman, Michael Jeffrey Shapiro, and Grammy winner Jack Gallagher. For other students, See: List of music students by teacher: R to S#Elie Siegmeister.
