= Invisible Eagle =

2000 book by Alan Baker

- Cover of the first edition
- Author: Alan Baker
- Language: English
- Subject: Occultism in Nazism
- Publisher: Virgin Books
- Publication date: 2000
- Publication place: United Kingdom
- Media type: Print
- Pages: 322
- ISBN: 1-85227-863-3
- OCLC: 43879187
- Dewey Decimal: 943.086
- LC Class: DD256.5 .B316 2000

Invisible Eagle: The History of Nazi Occultism is a book written by Alan Baker. It was first published in 2000 by Virgin Books. The book is focused on the intersection of occultism and Nazism. Among other subjects the book deals with the popular mythology of Hollow Earth theory, the Vril Society and similar speculative theories that were associated with Nazi Germany. Baker argues that there is little evidence for this postwar Nazi mythology, though argues some Nazi currents were influenced by esotericism. The book was seen as speculative and sometimes sensationalistic, though saw some praise.

== Contents ==
The book is focused on the intersection of occultism and Nazism, and its manifestations and influences on other occult elements. He particularly examines the influence of Ariosophy on Nazi ideas of the occult. He further notes the influence of Helena Blavatsky's Theosophy on such conceptions, but emphasizes that her ideas were hijacked, and argues she would have been against such manifestations.

Among other subjects the book deals with the popular mythology of Hollow Earth theory, Welteislehre, the Vril Society, the Holy Lance, foo fighters, and similar speculative theories that were associated with Nazi Germany postwar. Esotericist Raymond W. Bernard and his Hollow Earth theories are covered. While many other writers considered him to be merely a fraud, Baker argued that he was misled by his associates. Most of his chapter on Hollow Earth is unrelated to Nazism, rather Hollow Earth theories in general.

It also discusses the association of UFOs with Nazi conspiracies. He refers to the castle of Wewelsburg, though does not name it, and discusses an alleged ritual thought of by Himmler, to "to influence the mind of a person in the next room through the concentration of will-power". Baker ultimately argues that there is very little evidence for this postwar Nazi mythology, though argues some Nazi currents were influenced by esotericism. It contains notes, a bibliography, and an index.

== Publication history ==
Invisible Eagle was published in London in 2000 by Virgin Books. Its first edition was 322 pages. It was authored by British author Alan Baker. Invisible Eagle was part of a then-lucrative market for explorations of this topic matter.

== Reception ==
Scholar Peter Staudenmaier named it among a list of works on the subject of Nazism and occultism that were improved from the "extensive and largely trivial" and "decidedly inadequate works" on the topic, alongside Unholy Alliance by Peter Levenda and Hitler and the Occult by Ken Anderson, describing them as "thoughtful popular works that are less credulous though still derivative and excessively sensationalistic".

Scholar Eva Kingsepp criticized the academic book Vril: Eine okkulte Urkraft in Theosophie und esoterischen Neonazismus by Julian Strube for "legitimizing some speculative writers as reliable sources by making references to their books", naming this as an example; she also noted scholar Nicholas Goodrick-Clarke utilizing it as a source, which she found odd. The book was criticized by scholar Christian Giudice in 2022 as "under-researched". Despite this, it has been cited in several academic publications. Scholars Goodrick-Clarke and Strube were more positive in their assessments of the book. Goodrick-Clarke noted it as critically examining the subject matter. He noted that Baker "sought to document and analyze" the subject matter, despite its complications; he agreed with Baker it was "a valid field of inquiry, irrespective of the dubious nature of this latter-day literature".
