= Walter Siegmeister =

American esoteric writer (1903–1965)

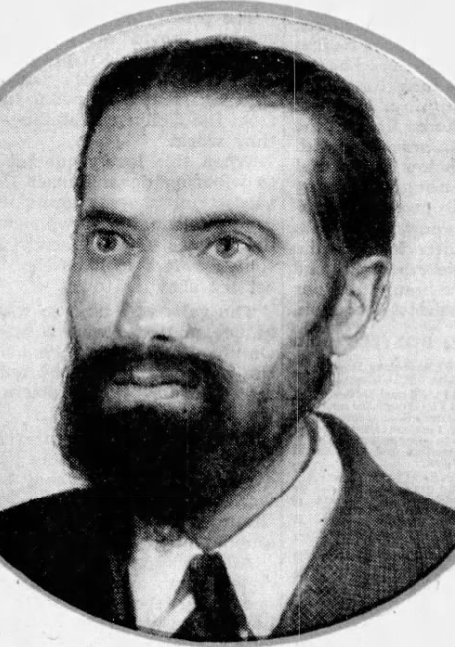
- Siegmeister from a 1943 story
- Born: Walter Isidor Siegmeister; 1903; Manhattan, New York City, United States
- Died: September 10, 1965 (aged 61)
- Education: PhD
- Alma mater: New York University
- Relatives: Elie Siegmeister (brother)
- Writing career
- Pen name: Raymond W. Bernard; Robert Raymond; Uriel Adriana
- Language: English

Walter Isidor Siegmeister (1903 – September 10, 1965), also known as Raymond W. Bernard, Robert Raymond, and Uriel Adriana, was an early 20th-century American alternative health advocate and esoteric writer, who formed part of the alternative reality subculture. He is credited with the merger of the Hollow Earth theory and religious beliefs about UFOs. He also founded several fruitarian or vegetarian utopian communes in several countries.

== Early life ==
Walter Isidor Siegmeister was born into a family of Russian Jews in Manhattan, New York City, probably in 1903. His parents, William and Bessie Siegmeister, were both born in Russia. His father, William Siegmeister (d. 1932), was a physician, and immigrated to the United States aged 15. Siegmeister had a younger brother named Elie Siegmeister who was a composer.

Siegmeister graduated from Columbia University in 1924, and received his Masters (1930) and Ph.D. (1932) degrees in education from New York University. His Ph.D. thesis was titled Theory and Practice of Dr. Rudolf Steiner's Pedagogy (New York University, School of Education, 1932). Under the name Bernard, Walter later settled in Florida. Siegmeister went by a variety of names, including Raymond W. Bernard, Robert Raymond, and Uriel Adriana.

== Communes ==
He founded several fruitarian or vegetarian utopian communes. He led colonists of these communes to join with false promises, in one instance claiming his Brazil commune would be safe from radiation after an atomic war; this was not true. He got into trouble after he sold "questionable health products" using the US postal system, and an assistant at one of his communes admitted they would sell farm animal feed at much higher prices claiming it was health food. A 1930s commune he ran on an island near Panama banned sex, drinking water, getting haircuts, and romance.

He went to Ecuador in 1941 where he met John Wierlo (pen-name: Johnny Lovewisdom, aka "the Hermit Saint of the Andes") who had arrived in 1940, where they spoke of plans for a paradisian utopia and a super-race in the Ecuadorean jungle. He was also interested in eugenics and attempted to create a "master race" through selective breeding in the jungles of Ecuador.

== Later life and death ==
On returning to the US, Siegmeister, now called Robert Raymond, continued to sell his books, before returning to South America. Walter moved to Brazil in 1955 or 1956, in order to buy land and create a super-race. In Brazil, he renewed his interest in aliens, Atlantis, UFOs, tunnels and the Hollow Earth concept. Siegmeister believed Brazil contained the entrances to the tunnels leading to the Hollow Earth. Siegmeister died of pneumonia in 1965.

== Beliefs ==
=== Alternative health ===
Siegmeister was a natural hygiene and raw food advocate. He authored many books on dieting and nutrition such as Meat-Eating: A Cause of Disease (1956), Super Health Thru Organic Super Food (1958) and Health Through Scientific Nutrition (1960). He was alleged to have practiced breatharianism and a fruitarian diet. However, it was noted by H. Jay Dinshah that he was actually living as a vegan.

=== Hollow Earth ===
Siegmeister was a proponent of the Hollow Earth concept and UFOs. His ideas were never taken seriously by academics and have been dismissed as pseudoscience. He is credited with the merger of the Hollow Earth theory and religious beliefs about UFOs.

Many of his works copied from other authors, much to their chagrin. His Hollow Earth books were published under the pen name Raymond W. Bernard. In 1960, he published Flying Saucers from the Earth's Interior, largely basing his arguments on the works of Ray Palmer; Palmer's claims about UFOs were false, and even Siegmeister included Palmer's statement that a source he had worked from had been "falsified". However, he did not include Palmer's statements about how the alleged North Pole flight within the Earth was also fake, citing it as evidence for his theories. After the publication of the book, Palmer complained that he had been copied and stolen from, and that Siegmeister had "quoted and misquoted" him "entirely out of context and many times falsely". He also said that he owed him money for advertising fees which he had not paid, and accused him of real estate fraud; writer Daniel Loxton said these claims were "apparently true".

In 1964, he found a New York publisher for another book, The Hollow Earth, which was based on Flying Saucers from the Earth's Interior. The book describes a purported conspiracy to conceal the existence of the Hollow Earth and its access points at the poles. Siegmeister claims that the North Pole flight was covered up by "certain secret agencies", which is an influential theory to Hollow Earth believers. Siegmeister's Hollow Earth ideas are mentioned in detail in Alan Baker's Invisible Eagle, 2000. Loxton described this book as "probably the best known source on the subject".

Daniel Loxton described him as "a shady operator" and "an untrustworthy character" in his piece on Hollow Earth theories.

== Publications ==
- Siegmeister, Walter (1932). Theory and Practice of Dr. Rudolf Steiner's Pedagogy (Thesis). New York University, School of Education.
- Siegmeister, Walter (1945). Apollonius the Nazarene: The Life and Teachings of the Unknown World Teacher of the First Century. Lorida: New Age Publications.
- Bernard, Raymond W. (1956). Escape from Destruction: How to Survive in an Atomic Age. Mokelumne Hill: Health Research.
- Bernard, Raymond W. (1956). Meat-Eating: A Cause of Disease. Mokelumne Hill: Health Research.
- Bernard, Raymond W. (1957). Science Discovers The Physiological Value Of Continence.
- Bernard, Raymond W. (1958). Super Health Thru Organic Super Food.
- Bernard, Raymond W. (1958). Pythagoras, the Immortal Sage. Mokelumne Hill: Health Research.
- Bernard, Raymond W. (1959). The Serpent Fire: The Awakening of Kundalini. Mokelumne Hill: Health Research.
- Bernard, Raymond W. (1960). Agharta. Mokelumne Hill: Health Research.
- Bernard, Raymond W. (1960). Flying Saucers from the Earth's Interior. Mokelumne Hill: Health Research.
- Bernard, Raymond W. (1960). Health Through Scientific Nutrition.
- Bernard, Raymond W. (1962). Prenatal Origin Of Genius. Durban: Essence of Health Publishing Co.
- Bernard, Raymond W. (1963). The Hollow Earth. Mokelumne Hill: Health Research.
- Bernard, Raymond W. (1966). The Secret Life of Jesus the Essene. Mokelumne Hill: Health Research.
- Bernard, Raymond W. (1970). Creation of the Superman. Mokelumne Hill: Health Research.
- Bernard, Raymond W. (1974). The Physiological Enigma of Woman: The Mystery Of Menstruation. Mokelumne Hill: Health Research.
