= Jan Udo Holey =

German author and conspiracy theorist (born 1967)

- Born: 22 March 1967 (age 59); Dinkelsbühl, West Germany
- Occupation: Writer
- Writing career
- Pen name: Jan van Helsing
- Years active: 1993–
- Genres: historical novel, documentary
- Subjects: conspiracy theories, ancient history
- Notable works: "Don't Touch This Book!" "Secret Societies and Their Power in The 20th Century“
- Movement: Esotericism

Jan Udo Holey (born 22 March 1967), often known by his pen name Jan van Helsing, is a controversial German author who embraces conspiracy theories involving subjects such as world domination plots by freemasons, Hitler's continuing survival in Antarctica following World War II, the structure of the earth as hollow, and others. His theories draw from sources such as The Protocols of the Elders of Zion.

His books Geheimgesellschaften (Secret Societies) and Geheimgesellschaften 2 have been banned in Germany, France and Switzerland for inciting antisemitic hatred.

The majority of his books, such as Die Kinder des neuen Jahrtausends. Mediale Kinder verändern die Welt (Children of the New Millennium, and how They Change the World) are non-political and deal exclusively with esoteric subjects.

== Life ==
Holey was born in Dinkelsbühl, Bavaria, West Germany, as the middle child of a wealthy family. His mother called herself a clairvoyant, and his father wrote three books dealing with gnostic and esoteric subject matter. Holey claims to have attended schools in Crailsheim, Bammental (near Heidelberg), Cambridge (in the United Kingdom), and Munich.

Holey chose his nom de plume "van Helsing", after he read Bram Stoker's vampire-novel Dracula at the age of fourteen.

Today, Holey runs his own publishing house, which publishes his own works as well as of others holding similar interests and viewpoints.

The Landesamt für Verfassungsschutz Baden-Württemberg (the State Office for the Protection of the Constitution of Baden-Württemberg) first referred to Holey in a 1996 report entitled "Rechtsextremistische Einflußnahme auf die Esoterikszene" (Right-Wing Extremist Influences on the Esoteric Scene).

== Political opinions ==
Holey draws from many esoteric and conspiracy theories, many of which originate in the United States of America. His writings encompass such varied themes as Nostradamus, reincarnation, conspiracy theories regarding John F. Kennedy and Uwe Barschel's murders. According to his detractors, Holey's books are largely plagiarized from other sources, many of which are conspiracy theorists of questionable repute. The author believes he is banned as part of a larger conspiracy.

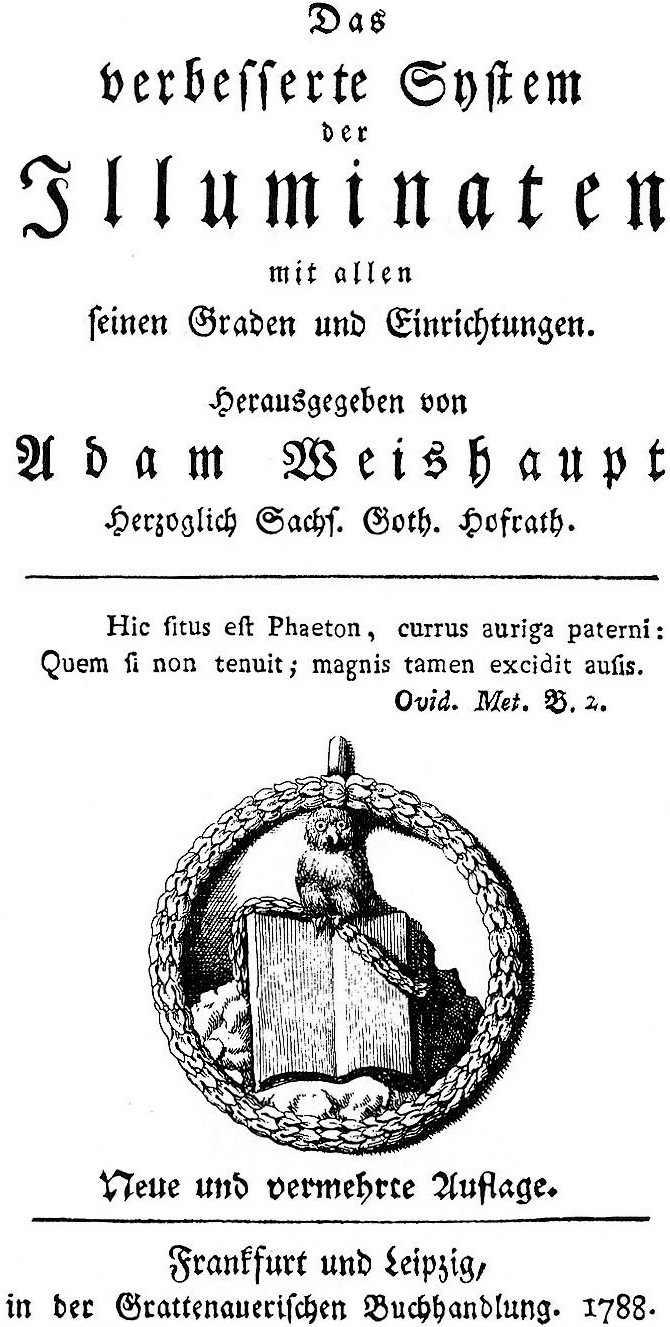
Minerval insignia

In Geheimgesellschaften, Holey combines science-fiction, esotericism, Nazi-mythology, ufology and "Zionist global domination" theories. He also employs The Protocols of the Elders of Zion as a source. He believes the Rothschilds head a Jewish conspiracy to rule the world and associates them with a mysterious cabal called the Illuminati, who plan a New World Order. Holey and his followers claim that they are not antisemitic, but rather that they speak out against powerful Jewish interests in high finance and politics.

== Publicist Activities ==
At the age of 14, Holey read Bram Stoker's novel Dracula, which inspired him to use the pseudonym "van Helsing" for his publications. He explains that the Illuminati, which several of his books target, are also made up of "bloodsuckers."

In the late eighties, Holey wrote his first book Geheimgesellschaften und ihre Macht im 20. Jahrhundert (Secret Societies and their Power in the 20th Century), which was published in March 1994 by Ewert-Verlag and mainly sold in esoteric bookstores. Within a few months, it became a bestseller. In 1995, the publication of Secret Societies 2 followed. The pseudonym was uncovered in July 1996 by critical reports in the magazine esotera and Der Spiegel. By the time the Jewish Community in Mannheim filed a complaint for incitement to hatred, which stopped the store sales, both books had probably sold more than 100,000 copies. The case was dismissed by the Mannheim District Court "due to lack of local jurisdiction." A complaint followed in Switzerland, after which both books were confiscated and indexed in both the Federal Republic of Germany and Switzerland by the Federal Department for Media Harmful to Young Persons.

Holey was first mentioned in reports of the Office for the Protection of the Constitution in the Report of the Office for the Protection of the Constitution Baden-Württemberg 1996, where he was reported under the heading "Right-Wing Extremist Influence on the Esoteric Scene." This was followed by mentions in the Austrian Office for the Protection of the Constitution 2000 and by the Federal Office for the Protection of the Constitution in 2004 and 2005, where Holey was described as a "right-wing extremist esotericist." Holey also made inroads into the social sciences as a "right-wing extremist esotericist."

Since the late 1990s, he has been publishing his works in the Amadeus Verlag, founded by his mother in 1998. Since December 31, 2009, he has been the CEO there. Blick nach Rechts wrote that he is considered the "most well-known representative of brown esotericism" with his publishing house. This publishing house also operates the website dieunbestechlichen.com; the imprint lists Holey as editor-in-chief. The site promises "uncensored news – politically incorrect and free!"

From 2007 to 2010 he operated the web TV channel Secret.tv, through which he spread his esoteric and conspiracy-theoretical theses. A film created by Holey and Stefan Erdmann about the Cheops Pyramid was distributed through this channel. The Evangelische Zentralstelle für Weltanschauungsfragen (Protestant Central Office for World Views) calls the Internet channel a "film portal for brown esotericism." The "Handbook of Alternative Media" describes the channel as "right-wing extremist internet TV."

In his books, Helsing draws on the conspiracy theories of authors Gary Allen and Des Griffin and their works The Insider (1970) and Who Rules the World (1976). In particular, he relies on the American ufologist Milton William Cooper, whom he also personally knew and extensively quoted from his work "Behold a Pale Horse." Holey asserts a global conspiracy of the Illuminati, which he includes Freemasons and Jews in. He holds the view that Hitler was inspired by Bulwer-Lytton's book The Coming Race (1871) and Ossendowski's title Beasts, Men and Gods, for which there is no evidence. However, with these claims, Holey perpetuates neo-Nazi stereotypes, as many passages of authors Bulwer-Lytton and Ossendowski have contributed to the formation of neo-Nazi legends alongside theosophical sources.

In October 2011, an extensive interview about his new book Hitler Survived in Argentina was published on the internet portal Kopp-Online of the Kopp Verlag. On December 23, 2011, a foreword by Holey was also published there in its original length.

=== Legal Disputes ===
In 1996, both books Secret Societies were removed from the market by order of the Jewish Community in Mannheim following a confiscation order by the Amtsgericht Mannheim due to incitement to hatred. Despite the criminal proceedings against Holey on charges of incitement to hatred being dropped in 1998 for formal reasons, both books remained banned because their content was "highly antisemitic."

As a result, the author sought to portray the banning of his books in the introduction and first part of his writing as constitutionally questionable. He wrote his legal interpretation on page 14 of the first part:

[The book...] is directed exclusively against the background forces, world conspirators, Freemasons, Rotary, [...] However, these groups are not part of the German population within the meaning of Article 130 of the German Criminal Code and thus not the target of this provision […]

In 2001, the Mannheim Regional Court lifted the confiscation order. However, the indexing in both countries was not lifted.

== Reception and evaluation of publications ==
According to Hubert Michael Mader from the Austrian Landesverteidigungsakademie, Holey managed to achieve the most significant coup of right-wing extremism after 1945 with his bestsellers. He incorporates various themes that have long been familiar in the esoteric scene and are unspectacularly received. According to him, the new aspect is that he sharpens them with unusually numerous right-wing extremist ideas and mixes them with interpretations based on his conspiracy theories, suggesting that the world, especially Germany, is threatened with destruction by secret societies. Jews are said to be leading this conspiracy. To a large extent, he mixes his own claims with the right-wing extremist writings of Holocaust deniers and ufologists such as Miguel Serrano, Wilhelm Landig, and the British anthroposophist Trevor Ravenscroft. Holey advocates authoritarian state and social concepts, whitewashes National Socialism, and denies Germany's war guilt. Holey assumes from the outset that his critics are afraid of (mental) change. He claims that he does not want to manipulate anyone, but his publications repeatedly create the impression that he intends to "reprogram" his readers mentally.

Rüdiger Sünner counts Holey among the disciples of the "Black Sun," who adapt Nazi myths of the superiority of former "Aryan" prime cultures such as Thule and Atlantis and incorporate them into their fantastic treatises, in which the Third Reich is glorified or its crimes denied. In particular, Serrano and Holey have contributed to the modernization of right-wing esotericism by incorporating UFO legends. Historian Nicholas Goodrick-Clarke notes that Holey's advocacy for humanity and the esoteric New Age ethos merely mask his antisemitic motives. The Handbook of Antisemitism dedicates an article to Holey. In it, he is attributed to the "so-called neo-Germanic-pagan scene" because he combines neo-right mythology and esotericism. Stefan von Hoyningen-Huene includes him among the "esoteric conspiracy theorists."

Tobias Jaecker also categorizes Holey within the esoteric spectrum, in which the belief in world conspiracy occupies a central position. Armin Pfahl-Traughber sees in Holey's works the connection of esoteric with right-wing extremist ideological pieces. Wolfgang Wippermann regards Holey's claims as exemplary of esoteric conspiracy ideologies, which, as can be seen from his writings, closely resemble national socialist ideology "down to the last detail." According to Ursula Caberta, he is the most well-known German conspiracy theorist. With his bestsellers, esotericism has become the most important gateway for right-wing extremist ideologies in the German-speaking world.

The trend of the esoteric scene towards right-wing extremist positions became apparent shortly after Holey's books were released, with the appearance of fifty to sixty esoteric right-wing extremist conspiracy books. The leader of the self-proclaimed "Aryan elite" Armanen Order, Adolf Schleipfer, promotes and recommends Holey's first volume of "Secret Societies" as a fundamental work on the topic of lodge entanglements that could replace entire libraries. Der Spiegel wrote in its edition 51/1996 about the "Secret Societies" Volume 1 and 2: "Holey's conspiracy theories read like a mixture of Mein Kampf, wild science fiction, and black magic." In May 1996, the news magazine Focus reported on the ban of his books in Switzerland.

=== Secret Societies and their Power in the 20th Century ===
In "Secret Societies and their Power in the 20th Century" (two volumes), Holey combines science fiction, esotericism, Germanic mythology, Christian numerology, and ufology, and speaks of a "worldwide conspiracy of the – identified as Jewish in origin – 'Illuminati' to the detriment of the world and especially Germany." In 1773, Mayer Amschel Rothschild is said to have conspired with twelve other Jewish financiers in Frankfurt to pave the way for their world government through three world wars by the year 2000. Holey explicitly refers to the "Protocols of the Elders of Zion", a published antisemitic fiction from the early 20th century that is supposed to prove the Jewish world conspiracy. Through his dramatic presentation, suggesting an extraterrestrial battle over the fate of our civilization, Holey was able to spread his Manichaean antisemitism in the New Age scene, according to Nicholas Goodrick-Clarke. To underline the credibility of the Protocols, Holey extensively relied on the conspiracy theorist Milton William Cooper. Objections that the Protocols are based on forgeries were commented on by Holey as: "The question of authenticity is incomprehensible to me. This would be equivalent to stating that the Ten Commandments are not genuine. It is completely irrelevant whether the Ten Commandments are from God, an extraterrestrial, or Mr. Müller. The origin is completely irrelevant. It is the same with the 'Protocols'. The things described in them are being applied."

Apart from the Protocols, Holey relies on numerous antisemitic and revisionist authors such as David Irving, David L. Hoggan, Germar Rudolf, and other Holocaust deniers. There is also a spiritual kinship with the intellectual father of the right-wing extremist European Workers Party (EAP), Lyndon LaRouche, with whom Holey shows solidarity. Holey views LaRouche as an opponent of the secret global conspirators who fell victim to a judicial scandal orchestrated by the American establishment and was wrongly branded a right-wing extremist by the Anti-Defamation League.

Citing the conspiracy theorist William Guy Carr, Holey claims, among other things, that the origin of the Protocols dates back centuries and that they are a plan to achieve world domination. According to Holey, a "Jewish banking system," especially the Rothschild family, works with the Illuminati as the "true rulers" on a global conspiracy. These intentionally triggered the Second World War to make the United States dependent on high finance through its enormous costs. Their ultimate goal is a New World Order. Other classic antisemitic ideologies propagated by Holey include the ritual murder legend, speculations about an alleged worldwide power of the Jewish lodge B’nai B’rith, and the claim that Jews are actually devil worshipers. He distinguishes between Semitic Jews and Khazars and Ashkenazi Jews, whom he counts as his true enemies. Furthermore, he prints several pages of the malicious translation of the Talmud by Johannes Pohl, which was published by the NSDAP for antisemitic propaganda in 1943. Additionally, Holey claims that Helmut Kohl was Jewish and originally named Henoch Kohn, and that HIV was artificially created on behalf of the alleged Jewish Illuminati.

The secret global conspirator network of the 'Illuminati' in Holey's ideology encompasses various organizations and associations, including the UN. Intriguing secret puppeteers behind the UN are said to have "caused all wars of the last two centuries themselves." The UN troops are an "international police force" to control independent states like Libya and Iran, which are defamed as aggressors by the (coordinated) international mass media. Holey presents a distorted revisionist view of history that leaves essential facts unconsidered and aligns with former NS propaganda in many areas, such as the question of alleged Jewish declarations of war against Germany, distorted depictions of Poland's role and the question of war guilt. To support his revisionist themes, he uses well-known neo-Nazi material like the Morgenthau Legend and asserts that German and Japanese peace offers were systematically ignored because the Illuminati elite wanted to destroy both countries to maximize investment opportunities and facilitate their integration into a planned global dictatorship. His conspiracy theories resembled a mixture of Mein Kampf, wild science fiction, and black magic. He describes a black magic-acting Tibetan order that was significantly involved in the establishment and shaping of the Third Reich. There is an underground organization called the "Black Sun," which, according to neo-fascists, operates underground bases and colonies worldwide inhabited by millions of Reich Germans. One of these bases is located at over 5000 meters in the Himalayas. Therefore, China invaded Tibet, tortured and killed Tibetan monks on behalf of Masonic Illuminati, to locate and eliminate the Reich Germans, hence thwarting the creation of a new "German Empire of Light." However, the Chinese endeavor failed because the Reich German colonies were located in hidden valleys under the protection of the highest Tibetan lodge, the "Gelugpa" or "Yellow Caps," who also protect the "Ariannis" (descendants of aliens and current inhabitants of underground realms).

In a clever montage of facts, unverifiable witness statements, half-truths, and far-fetched interpretations, Holey claims that Adolf Hitler attempted to find the entrances to the underground realm of Agartha inhabited by Aryans in the Himalayas using two SS expeditions, in order to make contact with the descendants of the Aryan godmen in their capital city of Shamballa. The king of Shamballa is said to be 'Rigden Iyepo', the King of the World, represented on the surface by the Dalai Lama. Other colonies of Hitler's 'last battalion' are said to be located in Neuschwabenland (Antarctica), the Andes, Greenland, the Canary Islands, African mountain ranges, Iraq, Japan, and the inner Earth. Holey writes of Allied attempts to attack the German colony in Antarctica, as well as the detonation of two atomic bombs over Neuschwabenland in 1958 which allegedly did not defeat the German colony. From this, he concludes that the German Reich still exists and never surrendered, with only the German Wehrmacht represented by Dönitz capitulating. Holey claims to have learned from a courier of the 'Black Sun' that in 1994 there was a standing army of 6 million soldiers worldwide, consisting of infiltrated Aldebarans, Arianns, and Reich Germans. This army purportedly has 22,000 Reich flying discs, leading the U.S.A. and Russia to initiate the Strategic Defense Initiative (SDI) program. The middle part of the first volume contains blurry photos of flying discs with swastika and SS symbols. Holey claims these are authentic, obtained personally from the British secret service who found them in hidden SS archives in 1945. Esoteric branches of the Thule Society and the SS (under the name "Black Sun") allegedly possessed UFOs with anti-gravity engines in the 1940s, with which they flew to the Aldebaran star system. Hitler approved the conception and construction of these UFO wonder weapons, with the involvement of Karl Haushofer, Rudolf von Sebottendorf, and Viktor Schauberger. Holey explicitly refers to Rudolf von Sebottendorf and his 'Thule Mythology' when claiming the existence of a 'higher race' from which the Germans originated.

=== Don't Touch This Book! ===
After the confiscation of his two conspiracy books by the Mannheim District Court for inciting antisemitic hate speech, Holey portrayed himself as a victim of conspiracy in his 2004 work Hands off this book! and marketed his alleged martyrdom in the advertising text as "the last secrets of our 'enlightened' world". According to Amazon, 165,000 copies of this most successful of his books were sold in Germany in 2010. Holey claims that the book deals with finding one's own personality. According to Ulrike Heß-Meining, he once again shows his right-wing extremist antisemitic views in this book, albeit in a more subtle form.

=== Other books ===
Holey's third book, The Third World War, was published in 1996 and contains prophecies from various fortune tellers. In the book Operation Aldebaran: Contacts with Humans from Another Solar System (1997), Holey deals with Aryan-looking extraterrestrials who are said to have come to Earth in UFOs to perform genetic manipulations on humanity. In 1998, The Inner World: The Secret of the Black Sun was released, which discusses the alleged invention of the Nazis, the Reichsflugscheiben, which are said to be stationed in the inner hollow earth today. In 1999, Holey reported on the legal proceedings against him in The Jan van Helsing File and portrayed himself and his ideas as victims of conspiracies. In 2000, he wrote about psychic children who could communicate with the dead and read auras in The Children of the New Millennium. Who's Afraid of the Bogeyman? (2005) explores near-death experiences, with the author also claiming to have conducted media interviews with death. In collaboration with Stefan Erdmann, Holey published The Millennium Lie: On the Trail of the Pyramid Mystery in 2008, which claims that the pyramids were actually water power plants. Previously, Holey had presented the same theory in his DVD film "The Cheops Lie". In April 2009, Holey released The 1-Million-Euro Book, which is inspired by bestsellers like The Secret by Rhonda Byrne and presents wealth as a result of one's inner attitude. In 2010, Secret Societies 3 – War of the Freemasons was published, featuring an alleged interview with a "high-degree Freemason" who confirms Holey's own claims. In 2011, Holey co-authored a book spreading the conspiracy theory that Adolf Hitler escaped from Berlin to Argentina in 1945. In 2020, the title We Kill Half of Humanity – and It Will Happen Quickly! was released, claiming that the "elite" plans to eliminate "inferior" peoples through diseases and plagues to transition the surviving rest into the "green-socialist New World Order"; according to the book, Corona is just the beginning – Holey purportedly knew about a supposed "Corona plan" since August 2019. Holey co-authored the book Handbook for Gods with his father Johannes Holey in 2021, providing esoteric insights through the "clairvoyant" Johannes and discussing why the Illuminati, whom he considers the masterminds behind world events, censor everything that could jeopardize their alleged machinations.

=== Film ===
Holey's network Secret TV produced the film The Cheops Lie. In addition, Secret TV sponsored the 2008 animated film Fabian the Goldsmith, which promotes a similar conspiracy theory to Holey's in Secret Societies: "Fabian the Goldsmith" allegedly founded the secret society of the "Enlightened" and has been directing world events ever since. According to the Federal Ministry of the Interior, the film "subtly conveys anti-Semitic stereotypes about 'power junkies of financial dynasties' who gain 'power over the masses'." The film was produced with the support of the Kopp Verlag. Other claims from Holey's work, such as the planned tattooing of a barcode on people by the "Enlightened," are also reflected in the film.

== Works list ==
=== Books ===
==== Under own name ====
- The Inner World: The Secret of the Black Sun. Novel. Ama Deus Verlag, Fichtenau 1998, ISBN 3-9805733-1-1.
- The Jan van Helsing File: A Documentation of the Banning of Two Books in the "Freest Country in German History". Ama Deus Verlag, Fichtenau 1999, ISBN 3-9805733-9-7.
- The Children of the New Millennium: Psychic Children Changing the World. Ama Deus Verlag, Fichtenau 2001, ISBN 3-9807106-4-5.

==== Under the pseudonym "Jan van Helsing" ====
- Secret Societies and their Power in the 20th Century. ISBN 3-89478-069-X (indexed and confiscated in Germany in 1996, lifting of confiscation order in 2001).
- Secret Societies 2 (the Interview). ISBN 3-89478-492-X (indexed and confiscated in Germany in 1996, lifting of confiscation order in 2001).
- Book 3 – The Third World War. Ewert, Lathen (Ems) 1996, ISBN 3-89478-573-X.
- Operation Aldebaran: Contacts with beings from another solar system. The sensational experiences of the Feistle family. Ewert, Lathen (Ems) 1997 (Copyright year), ISBN 3-89478-220-X.
- Hands Off This Book! Ama Deus Verlag, Fichtenau 2004, ISBN 3-9807106-8-8.
- Who's Afraid of the Boogeyman...? Ama Deus Verlag, Fichtenau 2005, ISBN 3-9807106-5-3.
- National Security – The Conspiracy: Top Secret Projects in Technology and Space Travel. Ama Deus Verlag, Fichtenau 2005, ISBN 3-938656-25-5.
- The Millennium Lie: On the Trail of the Pyramid Mystery. Ama Deus Verlag, Fichtenau 2008, ISBN 3-938656-30-1 (with Stefan Erdmann).
- The 1-Million-Euro Book Ama Deus Verlag, Fichtenau 2009, ISBN 3-938656-99-9 (with Dr. Dinero).
- Secret Societies 3 – War of the Freemasons. Ama Deus Verlag, Fichtenau 2010, ISBN 978-3-938656-80-8.
- Hitler Survived in Argentina. Ama Deus Verlag, Fichtenau 2011, ISBN 978-3-938656-20-4 (with Abel Basti).
- Politically Incorrect: Inconvenient Facts and Dangerous Truths That One Is No Longer Allowed to Speak Out! Ama Deus Verlag, Fichtenau 2012, ISBN 978-3-938656-60-0 (with Michael Morris, Andreas Popp, Johann Georg Schnitzer, Michael Friedrich Vogt, Stefan Erdmann, Ben Morgenstern, Johannes Holey, Rudolf Passian)
- If Patients Knew This – True Causes, Effective Therapies Ama Deus Verlag, Fichtenau 2021, ISBN 978-3-938656-75-4 (with Vera Wagner)
- With Jason Mason: UFOs and the Ringmakers of Saturn: NASA discovers huge spaceships in the rings of Saturn – and keeps it secret. New military whistleblowers report on the Secret Space Program and the return of the white gods! Amadeus Verlag GmbH & Co. KG, Fichtenau 2024. ISBN 978-3-9856202-1-0. ISBN 3-9856202-1-0

=== Audiobooks ===
- Stefan Erdmann: Interview with Jan van Helsing. Ama Deus Verlag, Fichtenau 2006, ISBN 3-938656-01-8.

=== Films ===
- The Cheops Lie
- Fabian the Goldsmith, 2008

== Literature ==
- Arnon Hampe: "Holey, Jan Udo." In: Wolfgang Benz (Ed.): Handbook of Antisemitism. Vol. 2: Persons. De Gruyter / Saur, Berlin 2009, ISBN 978-3-598-44159-2, pp. 375 f. (accessed via De Gruyter Online).
- Friedrich Paul Heller, Anton Maegerle: The Language of Hate: Right-Wing Extremism and Nationalist Esotericism: Jan van Helsing and Horst Mahler. Schmetterling-Verlag, Stuttgart 2001, ISBN 3-89657-091-9.
- Hubert Michael Mader: Studies and Reports: Political Esotericism – A Right-Wing Extremist Challenge. Landesverteidigungsakademie, Vienna 1999, ISBN 3-901328-36-X.
