= Margiotta =

Margiotta is an Italian surname. Notable people with the surname include:

- Adolfo Margiotta (born 1963), Italian actor and comedian
- Francesco Margiotta (born 1993), Italian footballer
- Joseph M. Margiotta (1927–2008), American politician
- Massimo Margiotta (born 1977), Italian-Venezuelan footballer
