= The Spear of Destiny (book) =

1972 book by Trevor Ravenscroft

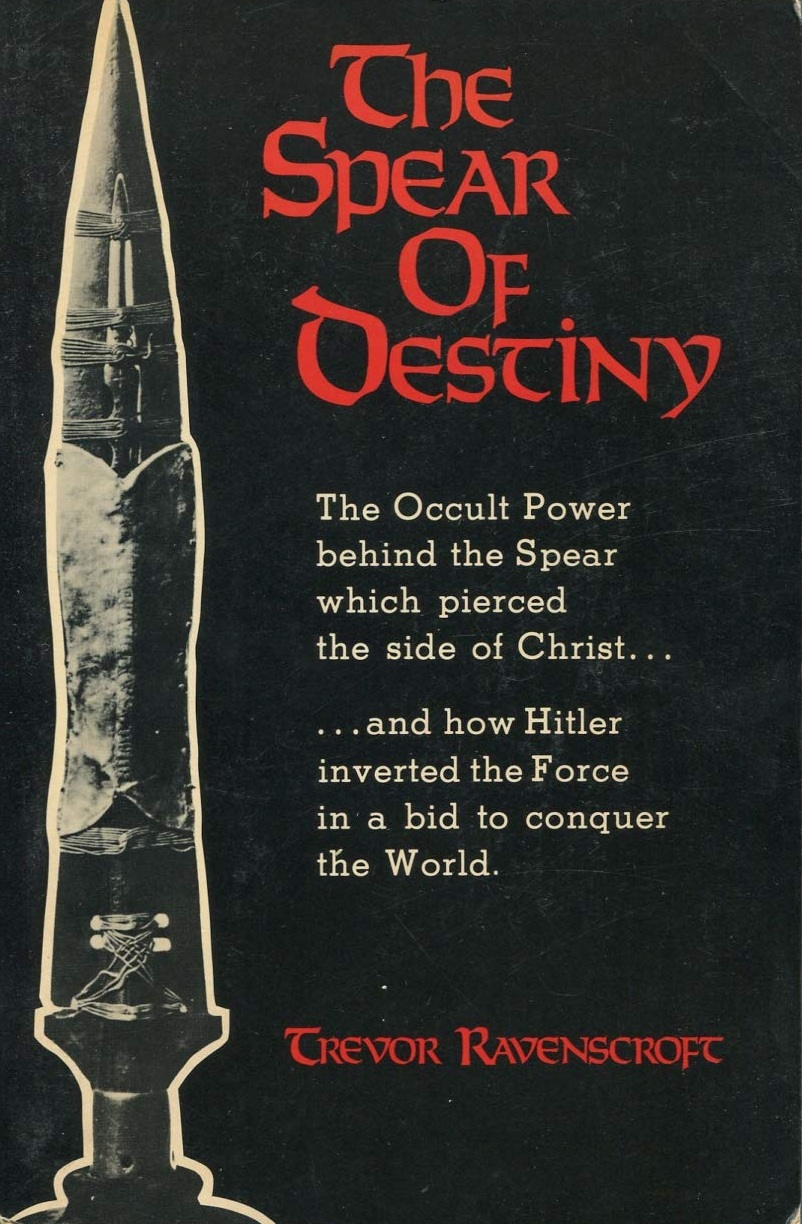
- Cover of first American paperback edition
- Author: Trevor Ravenscroft
- Language: English
- Subject: Holy Lance
- Publisher: Neville Spearman Publishers
- Publication date: 1972
- Publication place: United Kingdom
- Media type: Print (hardcover)
- Pages: 362
- ISBN: 0-85435-391-7
- OCLC: 678173
- Dewey Decimal: 133.44
- LC Class: DD247.H5 R373 1972

The Spear of Destiny: The Occult Power Behind the Spear which Pierced the Side of Christ is a 1972 occult book by the writer Trevor Ravenscroft about the Holy Lance and occultism in Nazism, published by Neville Spearman Publishers.

Reviewers generally found the book bizarre and its claims far-fetched; historian of occultism Joscelyn Godwin called The Spear of Destiny a "bloodcurdling work of historical reinvention". The Los Angeles Times described it as "one of the weirdest books of the year". Despite its factual inaccuracy, the book was a commercial success, was translated into several languages, and is, according to British historian Nicholas Goodrick-Clarke, one of the most influential works on Nazi mysticism in English.

== Background ==
The book was authored by the British writer and journalist Trevor Ravenscroft (1921–1989), formerly a British commando, imprisoned in a German prisoner of war camp as part of the World War II North Africa campaign. He then became a journalist. Some time later, he claimed to have met the Austrian anthroposophist Walter Stein. The book is supposed to be based on what he claims is the testimony of Stein.

Ravenscroft claimed that he wrote the book based on research "by using mystical meditation" and on papers of Stein supposedly given to Ravenscroft by his widow. He maintained Stein would have written the book if not for his "untimely death". He also said that the book was not written until Stein died due to Stein's wartime experiences. Writer Ken Anderson accepted that Ravenscroft may have met Stein, but said that it was unclear if the "fantasy" that was the book had originated more with Stein or with Ravenscroft.

== Publication history ==
It was first published by Neville Armstrong's Neville Spearman Publishers in 1972. It was published in the United States by Putnam in an illustrated edition the next year. With Putnam it was given a major advertising campaign. The book was a success; it was translated into several languages and was in print for the better part of several decades. The book received a sequel in 1990, The Mark of the Beast.

In 1979 Ravenscroft sued James Herbert for copyright infringement in Herbert's 1978 novel The Spear. While Herbert admitted to utilizing the book as a source, Ravenscroft claimed the book contained many instances of unauthorized borrowing. Herbert refused to pay him £25,000 in compensation, claiming Ravenscroft had himself plagiarized another author. Ravenscroft then sued him. During the trial, Herbert had a "strange experience" on a train, which he semi-seriously believed could be a psychic attack from Ravenscroft; during the trial Ravenscroft claimed he had met Herbert in a past life while Jesus was being executed. Herbert lost the court case and eventually removed the offending content from the book entirely, withdrawing its first edition from sale.

== Contents ==
Ravenscroft begins the book by saying that Stein should receive credit for having written most of it. The book claims to trace the history of the Holy Lance, the lance claimed to contain a nail that originally came from the spear that pierced the side of Jesus. Ravenscroft also writes of other forms of occultism, particularly Atlantis. Large sections are devoted to the claimed occult beliefs of Adolf Hitler and occultism in Nazism; Ravenscroft argues that he was brought to power through his pursuit of the lance and through its power. He writes that Hitler had a mystical encounter with the lance aged 19 and that this had forever altered the course of his life. Ravenscroft writes:

[The Holy Lance] [...] was to become the central pivot in the life of Adolf Hitler and the very source of his ambitions to conquer the world.

Ravenscroft claims Hitler was a Satanist. Large portions of the book are related to Stein's experiences.

== Reception ==
Historian of occultism Joscelyn Godwin called The Spear of Destiny a "bloodcurdling work of historical reinvention". Nicholas Goodrick-Clarke, a British historian and author of a book that critically analyzes ties between occultism and Nazism, The Occult Roots of Nazism, described The Spear of Destiny as the single most influential work on "Nazi Mysteries" in English, noting its influence on other works involving Nazi occultism. He noted the books Hitler and the Occult by Ken Anderson and Invisible Eagle by Alan Baker as critically examining Ravenscroft and his claims. Scholar Jacob Senholt said the former "debunked" The Spear of Destiny. Anderson wrote that Ravenscroft had "depart[ed] so far from historical fact as to construct a synthetic—an ersatz—history of Hitler and claim it as the truth".

Reviews of the book found its theories far-fetched, with the Los Angeles Times describing it as "one of the weirdest books of the year". Several commentators compared it to Richard Wagner's Parsifal. Kirkus Reviews wrote that it portrayed "Hitler as Charlie Manson" and provided no hard evidence for any of its claims. They wrote that while it was doubtful scholars would treat it seriously, "for sheer sensationalism [The Spear of Destiny] can't be beat". Publishers Weekly called it an "astonishing mix of fact and incredible assertion", with the more dubious elements coming from Ravenscroft. The LA Times described it as "a mishmash of history, black magic and legend".

Choice magazine said it was written in a "rambling, disorganized, rather flowery style" and that "the author's smugness is highly irritating." Publishers Weekly nevertheless described it as "oddly fascinating", though it may "drive some readers up the wall". Writer Colin Wilson had praise for the book.
