= Giorgio Galli (historian) =

Italian political scientist, historian, and academic (1928–2020)

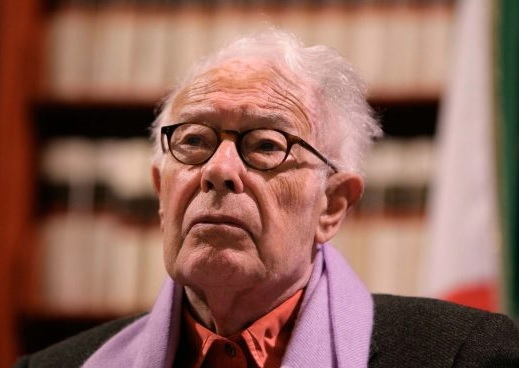
Galli in 2020

Giorgio Galli (10 February 1928 – 27 December 2020) was an Italian political scientist, historian, and academic.

== Biography ==
Born in Milan on 10 February 1928, he graduated in Law and was a professor of History of Political Doctrines at the University of Milan. He was one of the most successful Italian political scientists, and devoted much of his work to the analysis of the Italian political system, adopting methodologies borrowed from the social sciences.

His production as a historian was mainly oriented to contemporary Italian history, in particular to the postwar period. In many writings, he explored sociological themes with scientific rigour, paying particular attention to the union between official history and esotericism. His works were also characterized by the attention to hidden aspects of the history of political ideas, such as, for example, the "magical" or irrational roots that contribute to fuel mass adhesion to particular political ideologies, especially those of a totalitarian nature.

He collaborated extensively with the magazine Panorama and wrote a column entitled Le divergenze convergenti in the monthly Linus. He died in Camogli on 27 December 2020.
