= Serge Monast =

Canadian journalist (1945–1996)

Serge Monast (Project Blue Beam)
- Monast on Ésotérisme Expérimental
- Born: 1945
- Died: 5th or 6th December 1996 (aged 51); Montreal, Quebec, Canada
- Citizenship: Canada
- Occupation: Journalist
- Writing career
- Language: French
- Genres: Journalism, poetry, conspiracy theories

Serge Monast (1945 – 5 or 6 December 1996) was a Canadian conspiracy theorist. He is mostly known for his promotion of the Project Blue Beam conspiracy theory, which posits a plot to facilitate a totalitarian world government by destroying Abrahamic religions and replacing them with a New Age belief system using futuristic NASA technology and involving a faked alien invasion or fake extraterrestrial encounter meant to deceive nations into uniting under a new world government.

== Biography ==
In the early 1990s, he started writing on the theme of the New World Order and conspiracies hatched by secret societies, being particularly inspired by the works of William Guy Carr.

In 1994, he published Project Blue Beam (NASA), in which he detailed his claim that NASA, with the help of the United Nations, was attempting to implement a New Age religion with the Antichrist at its head and start a New World Order, via a technologically simulated Second Coming of Christ. He also gave talks on this topic. Cartoonist Christopher Knowles noted the similarity of Project Blue Beam to the plots of Gene Roddenberry's unproduced 1975 Star Trek screenplay The God Thing and the 1991 Star Trek: The Next Generation episode "Devil's Due".

In 1995, he published his most detailed work, Les Protocoles de Toronto (6.6.6), modelled upon The Protocols of the Elders of Zion, wherein he said a Masonic group called "6.6.6" had, for twenty years, been gathering the world's powerful to establish the New World Order and control the minds of individuals.

He died of a heart attack in his home in December 1996, at age 51.

Copies of his works still circulate on the Internet, and have influenced such later conspiracy theorists as American evangelical preacher Texe Marrs.

== Publications ==
- Testament contre hier et demain. Manifeste de l'amour d'ici, self-published, 1973.
- Jean Hébert, Chartierville, self-published, 1974.
- Jos Violon: Essai d'investigation littéraire sur le comportement du Québécois, self-published, 1975, 1977.
- (with Colette Carisse, Aimé Lebeau and Lise Parent) La famille: mythe et réalité québécoise, "Rapport présenté au Conseil des affaires sociales et de la famille", vol. 1, Conseil des affaires sociales et de la famille, 1974, 1976.
- L'Habitant, Éditions de l'Aube, 1979.
- L'Aube des brasiers nocturnes. Essai sur l'amour, Éditions de l'Aube, 1980.
- Cris intimes: poésie, Éditions de l'Aube, 1980.
- La Création irrécupérable: essai, Éditions de l'Aube, 1981.
- Méditations sur les dix commandements de Dieu, Éditions de l'Aube, 1983.
- La médaille de saint Benoît ou La croix de saint Benoît, Courrier de Saint Joseph, 1984?.
- Il est minuit moins quinze secondes à Ottawa: de l'impossible dualité canadienne à l'éclatement d'une Guerre civile, dossier d'enquête journalistique, La Presse Libre Nord-Américaine, 1992.
- "Présentation" de René Bergeron, Le corps mystique de l'antéchrist, Montréal, Presse libre nord-américaine, "Dossiers chocs", 1993 (reprint of 1941 book)
- Le gouvernement mondial de l'Antéchrist, journalisme d'enquête international, "La conspiration mondiale des Illuminatis", vol. 1, Éditions de la Presse libre, 1994. Reissued by Delacroix.
- The United Nations concentration camps program in America, "Coup d'État and war preparations in America", book 1, Presse libre nord-américaine, 1994.
- Vaccins, médecine militaire expérimentale, cristaux liquide, dossier d'enquête journalistique - CIA, Presse libre nord-américaine, 1994.
- Project Blue Beam (NASA), Presse libre nord-américaine [1994].
- Le Protocole de Toronto (6.6.6.). Québec année zéro, International free press agency, 1995.
- Le Contrôle total 666, Cahier d'Ouranos hors série, coll. "Enquêtes-Études-Réflexions" by Commission d'Études Ouranos. Reissued by Delacroix.
- Dévoilement du complot relatif au plan du chaos et de marquage de l´Humanité, Éditions Delacroix.
- Le Complot des Nations Unies contre la Chrétienté, Éditions Rinf, 1995.

== Sources ==
- Pierre-André Taguieff, La Foire aux illuminés : Ésotérisme, théorie du complot, extrémisme, Paris, Mille et une nuits, 2005.
- Pierre-André Taguieff, L'imaginaire du complot mondial : Aspects d'un mythe moderne, Paris, Mille et une nuits, 2006.
