= Nancy Tappan =

American magazine editor

Nancy Tappan was the co-editor of the newsletter Personal Survival ("P.S.") Letter in the late 1970s and early 1980s. She is now the editor of The New Pioneer magazine. Born Nancy Mack, she is the widow of Mel Tappan.

== Newsletter editor ==
Nancy Tappan co-edited what is perhaps the most important newsletter on survivalism and survivalist retreats in the 1970s, the Personal Survival ("P.S.") Letter. It was published from 1977 to 1982. The newsletter included columns from Mel and Nancy Tappan, as well from Jeff Cooper, Al J. Venter, Bill Pier, Bruce D. Clayton, Rick L. Fines (writing as "Ross Lee"), J.B. Wood, Dr. Carl Kirsch, Charles Avery, Karl Hess, Eugene A. Barron, Janet Groene, Dean Ing, Alexander Jason, James McKeever, Kurt Saxon, Bob Taylor, Reginald Bretnor, C.G. Cobb, Carl E. Krupp, and several other writers, some under pen names (such as "Dr. J.M. Browning"). The majority of this newsletter revolved around selecting, constructing, and logistically equipping survival retreats. Following Mel Tappan's death in 1980, Nancy Tappan took over publishing the newsletter, renaming it Survival Tomorrow in 1983. In 1987, Carl E. Krupp became the new editor and publisher.

== Book editor ==
In 1981, (following her husband's death on November 2, 1980), Nancy Tappan edited a number of Mel Tappan's magazine columns from Soldier of Fortune magazine and Guns & Ammo magazine, to combine them to create the book Tappan on Survival. A new edition of Tappan on Survival (with a foreword by Bruce D. Clayton) was released in 2009, and as of December 2009 ranks in Amazon's top 90,000 books (out of more than 4 million titles.) The book is published by Paladin Press. In the editor's introduction to the 1981 edition, Nancy Tappan wrote: "I have chosen to let the columns stand as he wrote them and have only updated information and grouped the material by theme despite the fact that the subjects treated are covered unevenly. Either time ran out before Mel had the chance to write more on a topic, such as medicine, money, barter or the management of stress or, as in the case of firearms, he wrote what may seem to some an inordinate amount because that was the subject in which his readers voiced the greatest interest. In my opinion, these columns are as important for what they reveal about the man and his approach to problem solving as they are for what they say about long-term survival. As Mel wrote on pages 122-123, "Most problems resolve themselves into self-evident solutions if you have enough reliable information and if you can eliminate emotion from the evaluation of it." Every problem that he encountered he approached with this attitude—be it field stripping a new gun for the first time, analyzing one of his favorite lyric poems or helping a friend in trouble. This method worked for him because he let neither pomposity nor pedantry warp his judgment; he was kind when the easy answer for someone with such quick wit would have been sarcasm and flippancy; and even when confronted with severe physical problems, he never lost the irreverent sense of humor that reminded him and those of us around him that we were, after all, merely human—flawed, funny creatures, but creatures who can think. Running like a leitmotif through everything Mel wrote is this theme: Take control of your life by becoming as independent of the system and others as possible, and as a first step toward achieving this, learn to look at reality in a hard, unblinking way. Whether he was discussing the .223 cartridge, two-way radio or the economy, the underlying message was always the same. I trust that you will see its inherent wisdom."

== Magazine editor ==
In June 2010, she became editor of a self-sufficiency and preparedness magazine called The New Pioneer, from Harris Publications.

== Family and other ventures ==
To honor her late husband, Nancy Tappan endowed Austin College (in the Northeast Texas town of Sherman) with the Melrose H. Tappan Jr. and Melrose H. Tappan III Presidential Scholarship.

After Mel Tappan's death, Nancy stayed on in the Rogue River Valley. She is still active in survivalism. In the late 1990s in partnership with her partner Vernon Hixson, she started a large wine vineyard called Evans Creek and Venture Vineyards, on a 60-acre (240,000 m^{2}) parcel. In 2009, she was a board member of the Grants Pass Irrigation District.

== See also ==
- Reginald Bretnor
- Bruce D. Clayton
- Jeff Cooper
- Karl Hess
- Dean Ing
- Retreat (survivalism)
- Don Stephens
