= James Wesley Rawles =

American author (born 1960)

James Wesley, Rawles
- Born: 1960 (age 65–66); California, United States
- Education: San Jose State University (BA)
- Occupation: Author; Blogger
- Military career
- Allegiance: United States
- Branch: United States Army
- Website: survivalblog.com

Signature
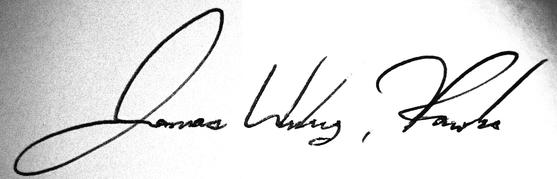

James Wesley Rawles (James Wesley, Rawles, born 1960) is an American author, former U.S. Army Intelligence officer, and survival retreat consultant. He is author of the best-selling thriller Patriots: Surviving the Coming Collapse, and proponent of the "American Redoubt", a survivalist refuge in the American Northwest.

== Early life and military career ==
Rawles presents his name as "James Wesley, Rawles", using a comma to differentiate between the names that belong to him, and that which belongs to his family. He was born James Wesley Rawles in California in 1960 and attended local public schools. He earned a Bachelor of Arts degree in journalism from San Jose State University.

From 1984 to 1993, he served as a United States Army Military Intelligence officer. He resigned his commission as a U.S. Army Captain immediately after Bill Clinton was inaugurated as President of the United States.

== Journalism and writing career ==
Rawles worked as an associate editor and regional editor (Western U.S.) with Defense Electronics magazine in the late 1980s and early 1990s Concurrently he was managing editor of The International Countermeasures Handbook.

He worked as a technical writer through most of the 1990s with a variety of electronics and software companies, including Oracle Corporation. In 2005, he began blogging full-time.

== Books ==
Rawles has eight books in print that are sold by mainstream booksellers: five novels and three nonfiction survival books.

His novels tend to be heavy on acronyms and technical jargon, while his non-fiction books concentrate on practical skills and tools. In the Acknowledgments note to his book Tools For Survival, Rawles credits David Brin, Algis Budrys, Tom Clancy, Bruce D. Clayton, Colonel Jeff Cooper, Frederick Forsyth, Pat Frank, Gordon Dickson, Friedrich Hayek, Henry Hazlitt, Ernest Hemingway, Dean Ing, Elmer Keith, Herbert W. McBride, Ludwig von Mises, Dr. Gary North, Arthur W. Pink, John Piper, Jerry Pournelle, Ayn Rand, Lew Rockwell, Murray Rothbard, George R. Stewart and Mel Tappan as influential to his writing. In his blog, Rawles also cites Robert A. Heinlein as an influence, and often quotes him.

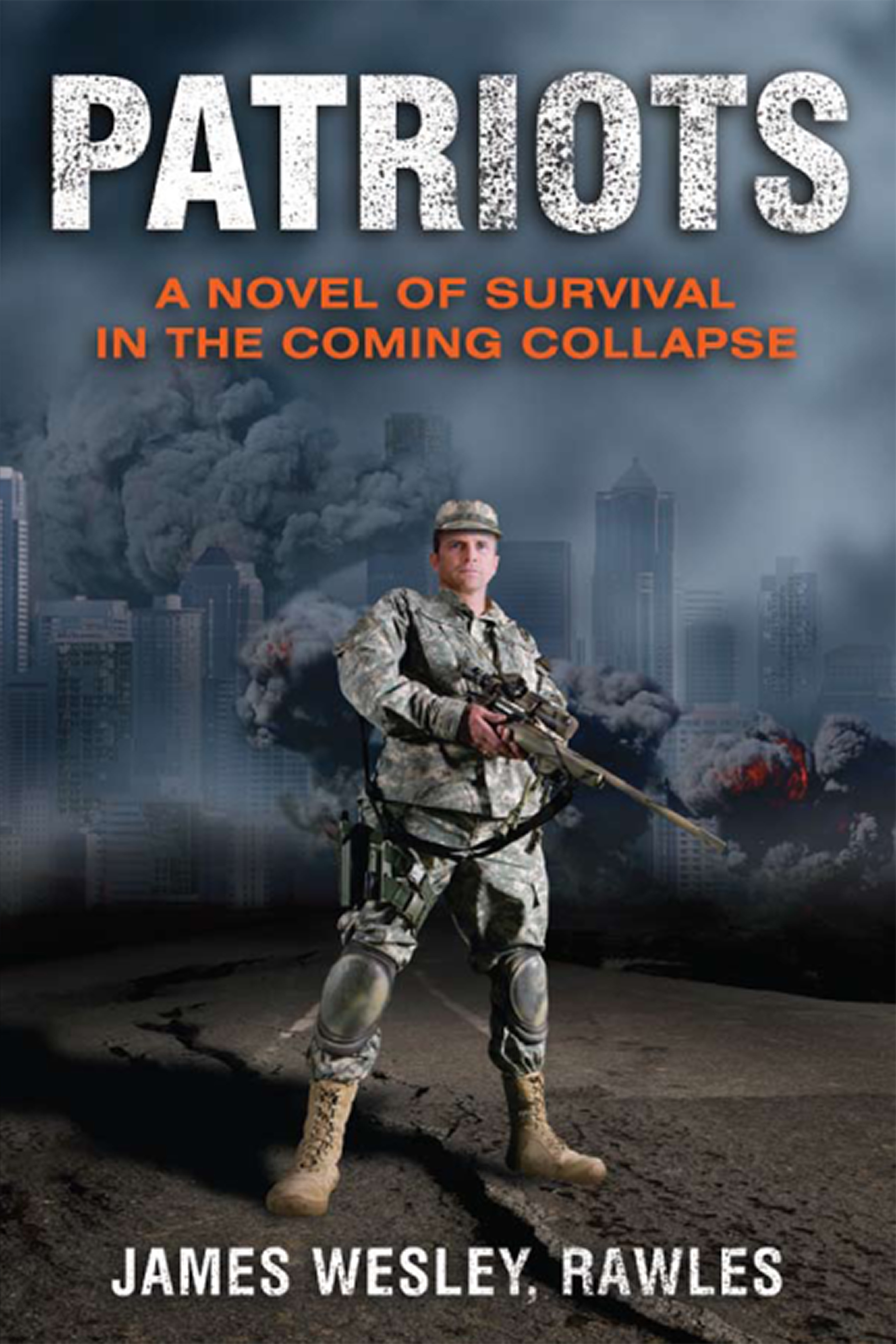
Cover of Patriots

=== Patriots Novels Series ===
His first novel was a work of speculative fiction set in a near future including hyperinflation and socioeconomic collapse. Initially titled: Patriots: Surviving the Coming Collapse, and later re-titled: Patriots: A Novel of Survival in the Coming Collapse. The book was originally released in draft form as shareware under the title "Triple Ought" in the early 1990s. It was released in a printed edition by Huntington House. After Huntington House went out of business, the book was re-released by Xlibris, a "print on demand" publisher. Starting in April 2009, the novel was published in a paperback edition by Ulysses Press.

In early April 2009, shortly after its release, it was ranked number 6 in Amazon.com's overall book sales rankings, but fell to number 33 a week later. By the end of the month it had fallen to number 98. The book's initial popularity caught librarians unprepared because it was considered a niche title and had not been reviewed by the major book review publications. Librarians then scrambled to purchase copies of the book to meet the unanticipated demand.

The popularity of the first book spawned four sequels: Survivors: A Novel of the Coming Collapse, Founders: A Novel of the Coming Collapse, Expatriates: A Novel of the Coming Global Collapse, and Liberators: A Novel of the Coming Global Collapse.

=== How to Survive the End of the World as We Know It ===
Cover of How To Survive The End Of The World As We Know It

His How to Survive the End of the World as We Know It: Tactics, Techniques, and Technologies for Uncertain Times is a non-fiction book drawn primarily from his posts on SurvivalBlog.com. The book was described as "The preppers' Bible", by a Reuters journalist. His blog addresses preparing for the multitude of possible threats toward society. Rawles describes how to prepare against a post-disaster society that suffers looting, armed violence and food shortages. He recommends establishing rural safe havens at least 300 miles from the nearest major city, financial planning for a future barter-based economy, water retrieval and purification, food production and storage, security and self-defense techniques and strategies.

The book received a mixed review from the New York Journal of Books:

For a neutral assessment of the huge efforts put in by the author, the book has its own strengths and weaknesses; however, the former outweigh the latter by a huge margin. One of its crystal clear strengths is the author's obsession with precision and a clinical eye for relevant details.

It received a favorable book review on the weblog of Orville R. Weyrich Jr. A summary of the book was published in the March–April 2010 issue of The Futurist magazine, under the headline: "Alarmingly Practical Advice For Doomsday."

Syndicated radio talk show host G. Gordon Liddy interviewed Rawles and said that his book "posits a collapse of civilization." When Rawles was interviewed by radio host Laura Ingraham, she described the book as going "through point-by-point the basics of being prepared and heightening your chances of surviving some type of major crisis." Ingraham said that "there is a thin line between order and total anarchy in time of a crisis, when peoples' lives are on the line—and all the niceties and the rules go out the door."

Brilliance Audiobooks produced an unabridged audiobook edition narrated by Dick Hill. As of April 2012, there were 12 foreign publishing contracts in place to produce editions in 11 languages. The German edition, Überleben in der Krise was translated by Angelika Unterreiner and published in 2011 by Kopp Verlag. The French edition, Fin du Monde: Comment survivre? was translated by Antony Angrand. It was released in September 2012. The Spanish edition: Cómo Sobrevivir al Fin del Mundo tal Como lo Conocemos was translated by Juan Carlos Ruiz Franco in Spain and Javier Medrano in the United States. It was released in April 2012. A Romanian translation (Ghid De Supravietuir) from Editura Paralela 45 in Bucharest was released in November 2013. It was translated by Ioan Es. Pop, a well-known Romanian poet, political figure, translator, and academic.

=== Tools For Survival ===
Tools For Survival: What You Need to Survive When You're on Your Own (2014) is non-fiction book drawn primarily from Rawles's SurvivalBlog.com posts. The publisher describes the book as "a guide to the selection, use, and care of tools." It was released on December 30, 2014, by Penguin Books, and immediately jumped to #1 in Amazon's Survival & Emergency Preparedness books category. (ISBN 978-0-452-29812-5). It is also sold as an e-book and audiobook.

=== Land of Promise ===
Land of Promise is described as the first book in the Counter-Caliphate Chronicles novel series. Released December 1, 2015, this speculative fiction novel is a geopolitical thriller. Set in the late 2130s, Land of Promise describes the world under the economic and military domination of a Global Islamic Caliphate, brought about by a fictional new branch of Islam, called The Thirdists. The novel also describes the establishment of a Christian and messianic Jewish nation of refuge, called “The Ilemi Republic”, in East Africa.

=== The Ultimate Prepper’s Survival Guide ===
In 2020, Rawles released The Ultimate Prepper's Survival Guide (ISBN 978-1645173779).

== Advocacy ==
=== Survivalism ===
Rawles is now a freelance writer, blogger, and survival retreat consultant. He is the author of the survivalist novel Patriots: A Novel of Survival in the Coming Collapse, and the editor of SurvivalBlog.com, a blog on survival and preparedness topics.

Rawles is an proponent of family preparedness, especially regarding food storage and advocates relocating to lightly populated rural "retreat" areas. His preparedness philosophy emphasizes the fragility of modern society, the value of silver and other tangibles for barter, recognition of moral absolutes, being well-armed, maintaining a "deep larder," relocation to rural retreats, and Christian charity. In an interview in The New York Times, Rawles identified himself as a "guns and groceries" survivalist. He warned, in 2012, that the U.S. dollar would likely be worthless within five years.

=== American Redoubt movement ===
The American Redoubt is a political migration movement first proposed in 2011 by Rawles which designates Idaho, Montana, and Wyoming, along with eastern parts of Oregon and Washington, as a safe haven for conservative Christians. Rawles chose this area due to its low population density and lack of natural hazards.

Rawles lives with his family on a ranch at an undisclosed location that he says is somewhere within the redoubt area, near a river and a national forest. He says they are almost self-sufficient with a three-year supply of food but have limited access to modern communications. He explains that one of his reasons for privacy is his fear of being overrun by media and fans of his books in the event of a crisis.

=== Philosophical, political and economic views ===
Rawles describes himself as a Constitutionalist Christian libertarian.

Rawles interprets the 2nd Amendment as supporting citizens' individual rights to bear and keep arms. He believes they should be able to take arms to public events.

Rawles is an anti-racist. In 2010 he explained that all races are equal in the sight of God, noting the Great Commission, while also defending the nation of Israel's existence because of its prophesied role in the Tribulations. He supports abolition of modern slavery in the world, particularly the enslavement of Christians by Sudanese Muslims.

Rawles is opposed to military interventionism.

The Southern Poverty Law Center describes Rawles as a Christian separatist and promoter of conspiracy theories associated with the anti-government Patriot movement.

=== Constitution First Amendment Press Association ===
In April 2014, along with his son Robert, Rawles co-founded The Constitution First Amendment Press Association (CFAPA), a private free press advocacy group that distributes press credentials to any literate adult U.S. citizen, free of charge, who agrees to abide by their “Constitutional Journalist’s Pledge”. Requirements include a promise that users “will not pander or bow to party politics, pressure groups, agenda pushers, conspiratorial cabals, statist lackeys, censors, or those who seek to hatefully divide us.”

== Bibliography ==
- Rawles on Retreats and Relocation, Print on demand from CafePress, No ISBN (January 2007)
- SurvivalBlog: The Best of the Blog, Volume 1, Print on demand from CafePress, No ISBN (February 2007)
- Patriots: A Novel of Survival in the Coming Collapse, Ulysses Press, Berkeley, California, ISBN 978-1-56975-599-0 (April 2009), ISBN 978-1-56384-155-2 (November 1998), ISBN 978-1-4257-3407-7 (December 2006)
- How to Survive the End of the World as We Know It, Plume, New York, ISBN 978-0-452-29583-4, (September 2009)
- Survivors: A Novel of the Coming Collapse, Atria Books, Simon & Schuster, ISBN 978-1-4391-7280-3, (October 2011)
- Founders: A Novel of the Coming Collapse, Atria Books, Simon & Schuster, ISBN 978-1-4391-7282-7, (September 2012)
- Expatriates: A Novel of the Coming Global Collapse, E.P. Dutton, ISBN 978-0525953906, (October 2013)
- Liberators: A Novel of the Coming Global Collapse, E.P. Dutton, ISBN 978-0525953913, (October 2014)
- Tools For Survival, Plume, New York, ISBN 978-0-452-29812-5, (December 2014)
- Land of Promise, Liberty Paradigm Publishing, Moyie Springs, Idaho, ISBN 978-1475605600, (December 2015)
- The Ultimate Prepper’s Survival Guide, Thunder Bay Press, ISBN 978-1645173779, (October 2020)

== See also ==
- Survivalism
- Kurt Saxon
- Ragnar Benson
