= Kenneth W. Royce =

American author

Kenneth W. Royce is an American author who primarily writes under the pen-name of Boston T. Party. He has written non-fiction books that offer a libertarian stance on privacy, police encounters, tax resistance and gun politics. His books are published by Javelin Press, which only publishes these works. He has written one fiction novel, Molôn Labé!, and is one of the founders of the Free State Wyoming project. In 2005, Royce was interviewed by Larry Pratt of Gun Owners of America on the nationally syndicated Live Fire radio show, about the Free State Wyoming project. He also speaks at Libertarian conferences.

== Synopsis of books ==
According to Royce, the Constitution was written not with the intention of creating a free society, but to create a political system of an ever-expanding Federal Government at the expense of individual rights and state prerogatives. His 1997 Hologram of Liberty led to his conclusion that only a free state movement could possibly counter the national trend of increasing regulation. A new version was released in 2009 with forty added pages addressing new court cases, the Patriot Act, and the (forever) War on Terrorism, and more.

Good-Bye April 15th details Royce's views on how the IRS has tricked millions of Americans into a limited tax jurisdiction. Published in 1992, Javelin Press announced that the title would go out of print in 2006: "Boston hates to see his first title go, but he grew weary of the tedious subject matter years ago and all the personal attention many of its readers often expected. So, he quit pushing the book, which no doubt reduced sales over time. He is very proud, however, of the book and that no reader ever contacted him with a negative experience from having used his procedures. Thus, the information (after 13 years!) has stood the test of time for thousands of readers. . . . Since 1992 there have happily emerged several new personalities, books, and websites on untaxation."

You and the Police deals with how to manage encounters with police and other law enforcement personnel. Royce stresses education as the best way to have successful encounters. He claims to have developed the techniques presented in the book through repeated experiences with law enforcement. Specifically treated is how to deal with law enforcement encounters when there are firearms involved. A new version was released in 2005 with forty added pages addressing new court cases, the Patriot Act, and the (forever) War on Terrorism, and much more.

Bulletproof Privacy covers how to maintain privacy in what Royce refers to as a more dangerous time. He covers both legal methods and those of questionable (or jurisdiction-dependent) legality. This was published in 1997, and Royce wrote an updated version to deal with the Patriot Act, the Internet, and other current privacy issues. This new version, which came out in May 2009, was titled One Nation Under Surveillance.

Boston's Gun Bible is Royce's 848 page exhaustive firearms almanac and philosophical treatise on becoming and remaining an armed citizen. The last full revision was in 2002, but dozens of pages have been added or updated in the reprints of 2004, 2005, and 2006.

Boston on Surviving Y2K is a survivalist book published in 1998 about how to prepare for the then-widely expected Y2K problem and also contains general information on emergency preparedness. Surviving Doomsday (A Practical Guide) is essentially a completed version of the same book that was published in September 1999 containing much more detail than was provided in the earlier book. Both books are widely suitable for general purpose disaster preparation and planning for individuals interested in surviving a wide range of disasters.

Molôn Labé! is Royce's only work of fiction. Published in 2004, it covers his view of what could happen as a result of a libertarian migration to specific counties within a specific state. It is partly a blueprint for his Free State Wyoming (FSW). In 2007, Royce told The Casper Star Tribune newspaper: "...FSWers aren't moving to Wyoming to change it, but to preserve and enhance its culture of freedom-mindedness. The state is already a 'good fit' for us, else we wouldn't be moving there."

Safari Dreams is Royce's entrance into big game hunting, for hunting both Dangerous Game (DG) and plains animals in Africa, based on his experiences from three hunting safari trips there. Published in January 2008, it covers the adventure and reasons for big game hunting in Africa, the selection of appropriate locations along with considerable guidance regarding safety considerations among the possible choices of locations, the choice of caliber and gun to take, and hints on tipping the PH (Professional Hunter), trackers, and staff. Taxidermy, obtaining the necessary licenses and permits, and customs clearance paperwork considerations are also covered. This book is written under his own name instead of under his pseudonym of Boston T. Party, and even contains many pictures of Royce taken while preparing to go and while on safari in Africa.

All his titles except for "Good-Bye April 15th" are available as paperback and Kindle versions. "Good-Bye April 15th" is the only Royce book out-of-print.

== Cultural impact ==
During the June 2010 U.S. Senate confirmation hearing of Elena Kagan's nomination to the Supreme Court, Royce was quoted by Senator John Cornyn (R-TX) in his opening remarks: "An email came across my inbox this morning that I thought of....'Liberty is not a cruise ship full of pampered passengers. Liberty is a man-of-war, and we are all crew.'....Of course we'll be talking about the different roles we each play on that crew'".

The Washington Post archived it as video

On Senator Cornyn's Facebook page, he accurately attributed the quote to Royce.

The quote is from chapter 19 of Royce's "Boston's Gun Bible".

== Bibliography ==
=== Non-fiction ===
- Good-Bye April 15th, ISBN 1-888766-00-X
- You and the Police, ISBN 1-888766-09-3
- Bulletproof Privacy, ISBN 1-888766-02-6
- Hologram of Liberty, ISBN 1-888766-03-4
- Hologram of Liberty (revised 2012), ISBN 1-888766-13-1
- Boston on Guns and Courage, ISBN 1-888766-04-2
- Boston's Gun Bible, ISBN 1-888766-06-9
- Boston on Surviving Y2K, ISBN 1-888766-05-0
- Surviving Doomsday (A Practical Guide), ISBN 0-7394-0526-8
- Safari Dreams, ISBN 1-888766-10-7
- One Nation, Under Surveillance, ISBN 1-888766-11-5
- Modules for Manhood, (Volume 1 of 3), ISBN 1-888766-12-3
- Modules for Manhood, (Volume 2 of 3), ISBN 1-888766-14-X
- Modules for Manhood, (Volume 3 of 3), ISBN 1-888766-15-8

=== Fiction ===
- Molôn Labé!, ISBN 1-888766-07-7

== See also ==
- Free State Project
- John Ross
- L. Neil Smith
- Mel Tappan
- Claire Wolfe
