= Roy Masters =

Roy Masters may refer to:

- Roy Masters (commentator), British-born American talk radio personality
- Roy Masters (rugby league), Australian rugby league football coach and journalist
