= John Pugsley =

American politician, lecturer, and author (1934–2011)

John Allen Pugsley
- Born: January 5, 1934; Minnesota, U.S.
- Died: April 8, 2011 (aged 77)
- Education: El Camino College; University of Florida; UCLA
- Occupations: Writer; political commentator; lecturer; investor; publisher
- Organizations: The Bio-Rational Institute; The Sovereign Society; The Eris Society
- Notable work: Common Sense Economics; The Alpha Strategy
- Military career
- Allegiance: United States
- Branch: United States Army

John Allen Pugsley (January 5, 1934 – April 8, 2011) was an American voluntaryist libertarian political, economics commentator, lecturer, and best-selling author.

== Early life ==
Pugsley was born in Minnesota. He attended El Camino Junior College, the University of Florida, and graduated from UCLA. After serving in the U.S. Army, he spent a year cruising on a 38-foot sailboat, and another year living in Mexico with his wife and children. He then returned to the U.S. and spent the next two decades as a businessman.

== Career ==
In the late 1950s to mid-1960s 1960s Pugsley worked at General Dynamics – Astronautics Sycamore Canyon Rocket Test facility as a technical writer. Among other projects, he wrote countdown procedures for Atlas and Centaur Rocket tests.

In the late 1960s, Pugsley entered the investment business, founded a publishing company, the Common Sense Press, and wrote his first book, Common Sense Economics. It sold over 150,000 hardcover copies. His second book, The Alpha Strategy (1980), was on the New York Times bestseller list for nine weeks in 1981. Pugsley distributed a PDF edition of the book free of charge (as of 2012, the author's domain has expired. A reposting of the PDF has been provided by fans). Even after 31 years in circulation as of 2012, The Alpha Strategy is considered a standard reference on stocking up on food and household goods as a hedge against inflation. This has made it popular with survivalists.

In Common Sense Economics Pugsley cites as influences Murray Rothbard, Henry Hazlitt, and Ludwig von Mises, and subsequent works also cite Andrew J. Galambos. In 1995, he authored an open letter to Harry Browne advising him against running for president; Pugsley's argument was based on the principles of voluntaryism and non-voting.

In 1975, he began a newsletter on economic and political events, Common Sense Viewpoint (1974), which had 30,000 subscribers at its peak. In 1988, he began publishing John Pugsley's Journal, an investment-economic newsletter covering political, economic, and investment topics.

In the mid-1970s, after reading E.O. Wilson's book Sociobiology: The New Synthesis, Pugsley began to study evolutionary biology. As his study continued over the next 25 years, he founded The Bio-Rational Institute.

Pugsley was one of the founding members of The Eris Society. In 1997, he helped found The Sovereign Society, an international organization dedicated to maintaining and protecting its members' privacy, wealth, and liberty. The society is primarily geared toward expatriate relocation, offshore banking and trusts. Pugsley was the society's chairman at the time of his death and wrote a monthly column for its e-newsletter, The Sovereign Individual. In 2006, he founded "The Stealth Investor", a weekly e-letter stock advisory letter.

== Later years and death ==
Near the end of his life, Pugsley lived in Carlsbad, California, and just before moving there, he lived aboard a 50-foot sloop named Eris Island in the Abacos, Bahamas, with Kiana Delamare. Delamare has written for EscapeArtist.com and the International Living e-newsletter.

Pugsley died at age 77 on April 8, 2011.

== Books authored ==
- Common Sense Economics (1974) ISBN 978-0-917572-00-5
- The Metals Investors Handbook (1983) ISBN 9780917572043
- The Alpha Strategy: The Ultimate Plan of Financial Self-Defense for the Small Investor (1980) ISBN 978-0-936906-04-1
- The Bank Book (1981) ASIN B00070VD7W
- The Copper Play (1980)
- The Interest Rate Strategy (1982) ASIN B0006QV052

== See also ==
- Retreat (survivalism)
- Survivalism
- Self-sufficiency
- Voluntaryism
