= Retreat (survivalism) =

Place of refuge for those in the survivalist subculture or movement

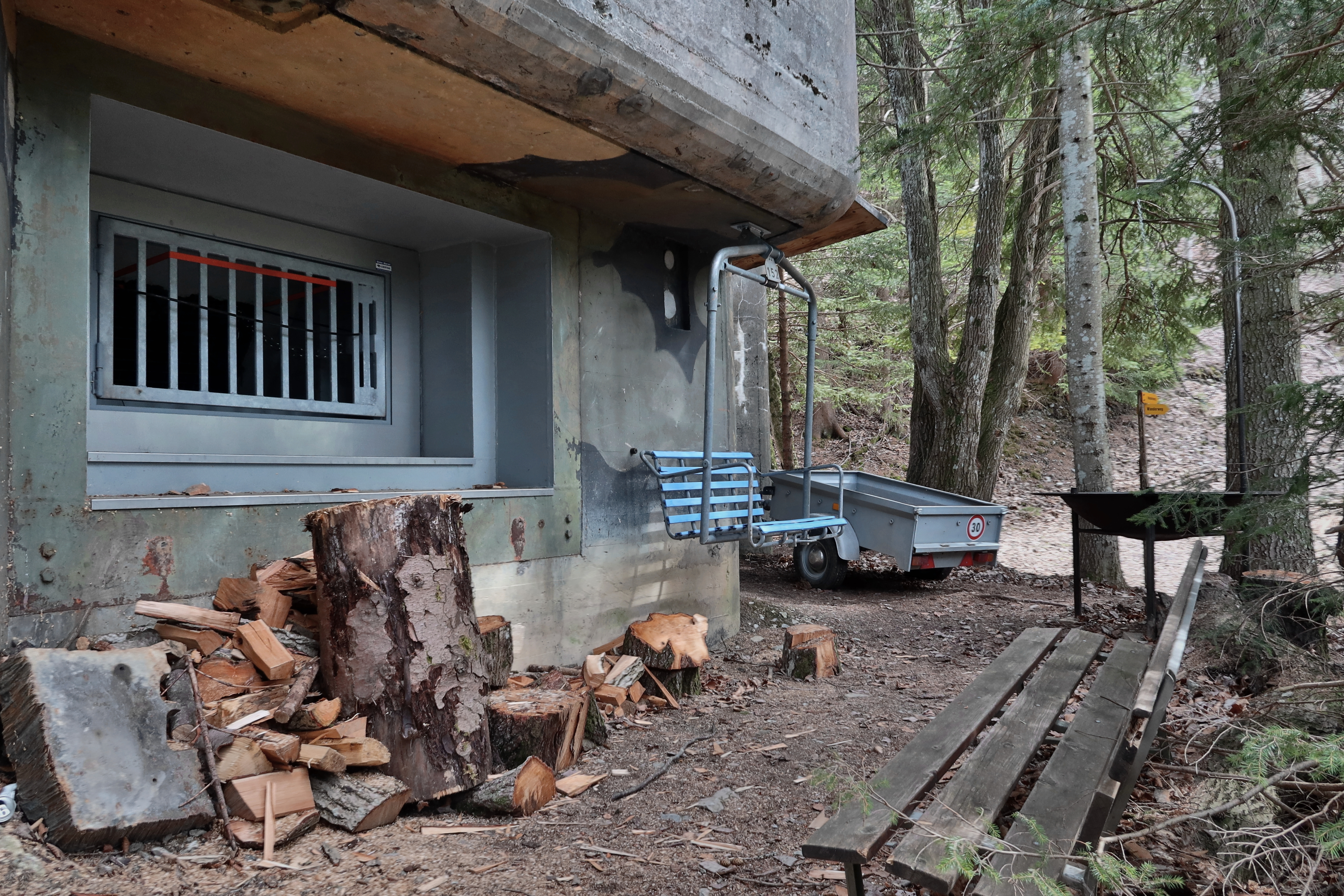
A woodpile at Fort Furggells in Switzerland, a decommissioned military bunker sold to a survivalist group

In the survivalist subculture or movement, a retreat is a place of refuge. Sometimes their retreats are called a bug-out location (BOL), a bunker, or a bolt hole. Survivalist retreats are intended to be self-sufficient and easily defended. Generally, they are located in sparsely populated outback rural areas.

== History ==
While fallout shelters have been advocated since the 1950s, dedicated self-sufficient survivalist retreats have been advocated only since the mid-1970s. The survival retreat concept has been touted by a number of influential survivalist writers including Ragnar Benson, Robert K. Brown, Barton Biggs, Bruce D. Clayton, Jeff Cooper, Cresson Kearny, James Wesley Rawles, Howard Ruff, Kurt Saxon, Joel Skousen, Don Stephens, Mel Tappan, and Nancy Tappan. Survivalists or "preppers" build these survivalist retreats to help them survive in the event of a disaster or simply "disappear," hence, the need for self-sufficiency.

=== 1960s ===
With the increasing inflation of the 1960s, the impending U.S. monetary devaluation, the continuing concern with possible nuclear exchanges between the US and the Soviet Union, and the increasing vulnerability of urban centers to supply shortages and other systems failures, a number of primarily conservative and libertarian thinkers began suggesting that individual preparations would be wise. This was further reinforced by the effort on the part of the U.S. government to encourage the installation of bomb and fallout shelters in the United States after the Cuban Missile Crisis. Harry Browne also began offering seminars in 1967 on how to survive a monetary collapse. He worked with Don Stephens, an architect, survival bookseller, and author, who provided input on how to build and equip a remote survival retreat. He provided a copy of his original Retreater's Bibliography (1967) for each seminar participant.

Articles on the subject appeared in such small-distribution libertarian publications as The Innovator and Atlantis Quarterly. It was also from this period that Robert D. Kephart began publishing Inflation Survival Letter (later renamed Personal Finance). The newsletter included a continuing section on personal preparedness by Stephens for several years. It promoted expensive seminars around the US on the same cautionary topics. Stephens participated, along with James McKeever and other defensive investing, hard currency advocates.

=== 1970s ===
In 1975, Kurt Saxon began publishing a newsletter called The Survivor, which advocated moving to lightly populated regions to "lie low" during a socio-economic collapse, and setting up fortified enclaves for defense against what he termed "killer caravans" of looters from urban areas.

In 1976, Don Stephens popularized the term "retreater" and advocated relocating to a rural retreat when society breaks down.

Writers such as Howard Ruff warned about socio-economic collapse and recommended moving to lightly populated farming regions, most notably in his 1979 book How to Prosper During the Coming Bad Years, a best-seller in 1979.

For a time in the 1970s, the terms "survivalist" and "retreater" were used interchangeably. The term "retreater" eventually fell out of favor. This was attributed to the United States withdrawal from Vietnam, which led to the perception that the country was less at risk of being attacked. People began to become interested again as public paranoia intensified over the Soviet threat during Cold War period.

One of the most important newsletters on survivalism and survivalist retreats in the 1970s was the Personal Survival ("P.S.") Letter (c. 1977–1982) published by Mel Tappan, who also authored the books Survival Guns and Tappan on Survival. The newsletter included columns from Tappan, as well from Jeff Cooper, Al J. Venter, Bill Pier, Bruce D. Clayton, Rick Fines, Nancy Mack Tappan, J. B. Wood, Dr. Carl Kirsch, Charles Avery, Karl Hess, Eugene A. Barron, Janet Groene, Dean Ing, Bob Taylor, Reginald Bretnor, C. G. Cobb, and several other writers, some under pen names. The majority of this newsletter revolved around selecting, constructing and logistically equipping survival retreats. Following Tappan's death in 1980, Karl Hess took over publishing the newsletter, eventually renaming it Survival Tomorrow.

=== 1980s ===
Survivalist retreat books of the 1980s were typified by the 1980 book Life After Doomsday by Bruce D. Clayton, advocating survival retreats in locales that would minimize fallout, as well as specially constructing blast shelters and/or fallout shelters that would provide protection in the event of a nuclear war.

=== 1990s ===
Several books published in the 1990s offered advice on survival retreats and relocation. Some influential in survivalist circles are Survival Retreat: A Total Plan For Retreat Defense by Ragnar Benson, Strategic Relocation – North American Guide to Safe Places by Joel Skousen, and The Secure Home, (also by Skousen).

=== 2000 to present ===
In recent years, advocacy of survivalist retreats has had a strong resurgence after the terrorist attacks on the World Trade Center in New York City in 2001, the 2002 attacks and 2005 attacks in Bali, the 2004 Madrid train bombings in Spain, and the 2005 public transportation bombings in London.

Several books published since 2000 advocate survival retreats and relocation. Some that have been particularly influential in survivalist circles are How to Implement a High Security Shelter in the Home by Joel Skousen, Rawles on Retreats and Relocation by James Wesley Rawles, and Life After Terrorism: What You Need to Know to Survive in Today's World by Bruce D. Clayton.

Economic troubles emerging from the credit collapse triggered by the 2007 U.S. subprime mortgage crisis have prompted a wider cross-section of the populace to modify their homes as well as establish dedicated survival retreats. James Wesley Rawles, the editor of SurvivalBlog was quoted by the New York Times in April 2008 that "interest in the survivalist movement 'is experiencing its largest growth since the late 1970s'”. He also stated that his blog's conservative core readership has been supplemented with "an increasing number of stridently green and left-of-center readers."

== Necessity for retreats ==
Mel Tappan was quoted by then AP correspondent Peter Arnett that: "The concept most fundamental to long term disaster preparedness, in retreating, is having a safe place to go to avoid the concentrated violence destined to erupt in the cities."

== Common retreat locale parameters ==
Common retreat locale selection parameters include light population density, plentiful water, arable land, good solar exposure for gardening and photovoltaics, situation above any flood plains, and a diverse and healthy local economy. Fearing rioting, looting and other unrest, many survivalists advocate selecting retreat locales that are more than one tank of gasoline away from any major metropolitan region. Properties that are not in "channelized areas" or on anticipated "refugee lines of drift" are also touted.

One of the key goals of retreats is to be self-sufficient for the duration of societal collapse. To that end, plentiful water and arable soil are paramount considerations. Beyond that, a priority is situation on isolated, defensible terrain. Typically, retreats do not want their habitations or structures jeopardized by being within line of sight of any major highway.

Because of its low population density and diverse economy, James Wesley Rawles and Joel Skousen both recommend the Intermountain West region of the United States as a preferred region for relocation and setting up retreats. Although it has higher population density, Mel Tappan recommended southwestern Oregon, where he lived, primarily because it is not downwind of any envisioned nuclear targets in the United States.

Mel Tappan was disappointed by the demographics of southwestern Oregon after the survivalist influx of the late 1970s. "Too many doctors and lawyers" relocated to Oregon, and "not enough plumbers, electricians, or carpenters."

=== Evacuation to a retreat ===
While some survivalists recommend living at a rural retreat year-round, most survivalists cannot afford to do so. Therefore, they rely on keeping a well-stocked retreat, and plan to go there "at the 11th hour", as necessary. They keep a bug-out bag handy, and may have a dedicated bug-out vehicle (BOV). This is a vehicle that the owner keeps prepared in the event of the need for an emergency evacuation. Typically a BOV is equipped with a variation on the bug-out bag that includes additional automotive supplies, clothing, food, and water. Survivalists tend to favor ATV/Off-road vehicles in particular such as four wheel drive, pickup trucks, SUVs and motorbikes such as Streetfighters, Enduros/Supermotos etc due to their greater off-road/handling abilities. Survivalists may opt into maintaining an older vehicle as they most likely lack critical electronic components that could be damaged by the electromagnetic pulse that accompanies a nuclear explosion.

== Retreat organization ==
Most survivalist retreats are created by individuals and their families, but larger "group retreats" or "covenant communities" are formed along the lines of an intentional community.

== Retreat architecture and security ==
Jeff Cooper popularized the concept of hardening retreats against small arms fire. In an article entitled "Notes on Tactical Residential Architecture" in Issue #30 of P.S. Letter (April, 1982), Cooper suggested using the "Vauban Principle", whereby projecting bastion corners would prevent miscreants from being able to approach a retreat's exterior walls in any blind spots. Corners with this simplified implementation of a Vauban Star are now called "Cooper Corners" by James Wesley Rawles, in honor of Jeff Cooper. Depending on the size of the group needing shelter, design elements of traditional European castle architecture, as well as Chinese Fujian Tulou and Mexican walled courtyard houses have been suggested for survival retreats.

In both his book Rawles on Retreats and Relocation and in his survivalist novel, Patriots: A Novel of Survival in the Coming Collapse, Rawles describes in great detail retreat groups "upgrading" brick or other masonry houses to that of a blockhouse with steel reinforced window shutters and doors, excavating anti-vehicular ditches, installing warded gate locks, constructing concertina wire obstacles, and fougasses, and setting up listening post/observation posts (LP/OPs.) Rawles is a proponent of including a mantrap foyer at survival retreats, an architectural element that he calls a "crushroom".

Both Bruce D. Clayton and Joel Skousen have written extensively on integrating fallout shelters into retreat homes, but they put less emphasis on ballistic protection and exterior perimeter security than Cooper and Rawles.

== Retreat logistics ==
Anticipating long periods of time without commerce in the future, as well as observing documented history, retreat groups typically place a strong emphasis on logistics. They amass stockpiles of supplies for their own use, for charity, and for barter. Frequently cited key logistics for a retreat include long-term storage food, common caliber ammunition, medical supplies, tools, gardening seed, and fuel. In an article entitled "Ballistic Wampum" in Issue #6 of P.S. Letter (1979) Jeff Cooper wrote about stockpiling ammunition far in excess of his own needs, keeping the extra available to use for bartering.

In their books, Joel Skousen, Mel Tappan, and Howard Ruff all emphasize the need to have a one-year supply of storage food.

Mainstream economist and financial adviser Barton Biggs is a proponent of well-stocked retreats. In his 2008 book Wealth, War, and Wisdom, Biggs has a gloomy outlook for the economic future, and suggests that investors take survivalist measures. In the book, Biggs recommends that his readers should “assume the possibility of a breakdown of the civilized infrastructure.” He goes so far as to recommend setting up survival retreats: “Your safe haven must be self-sufficient and capable of growing some kind of food,” Mr. Biggs writes. “It should be well-stocked with seed, fertilizer, canned food, wine, medicine, clothes, etc. Think Swiss Family Robinson. Even in America and Europe there could be moments of riot and rebellion when law and order temporarily breaks down.”

== Survivalist retreats worldwide ==
Survivalist retreats, both formal and informal exist worldwide, most visibly in Australia, Belgium, Canada, France, Germany (often organized under the guise of "adventuresport" clubs), New Zealand, Norway, Sweden, and the United States.

== Government operated retreats ==
Construction of government-built retreats, security compounds and underground shelters—roughly analogous to survivalist retreats—has been done extensively since the advent of the Cold War, especially of public nuclear fallout shelters in many nations. The United States government has created Continuity of Government (COG) shelters built by the Department of Defense and Federal Emergency Management Agency ("FEMA"). These include the massive shelter built under the Greenbrier hotel (a.k.a. Project Greek Island), military facilities such as Cheyenne Mountain Complex, and the Raven Rock Mountain Complex, and Mount Weather sites. Facilities in other nations include the Swiss redoubt fortress system and its dual use facilities such as the Sonnenberg Tunnel and Norway's Sentralanlegget bunker in Buskerud County.

== See also ==
- Survival kit
- Panic room
- Blockhouse
- Tsunami house
