= The Gnurrs Come from the Voodvork Out =

"The Gnurrs Come from the Voodvork Out" is a 1950 science fantasy short story by Reginald Bretnor. It was first published in The Magazine of Fantasy & Science Fiction.

== Synopsis ==
Papa Schimmelhorn is a semi-literate, self-taught mad scientist who invents a "gnurr-pfeife": a musical instrument which, when used to play the song "The Church in the Wildwood", summons clothing-eating monsters ("gnurrs") from the fourth dimension (such that they literally come out of the woodwork).

== Reception ==
"The Gnurrs Come from the Voodvork Out" was a finalist for the 1951 Retro-Hugo Award for Best Short Story.

In the Encyclopedia of Science Fiction, John Clute called it "hilarious" and Bretnor's "single most famous story", and stated that it "epitomized (...) the wit and literacy (of) The Magazine of Fantasy and Science Fiction".
