= Howard Ruff =

American financial adviser and writer

- Born: Howard Joseph Ruff; December 27, 1930; Berkeley, California, U.S.
- Died: November 12, 2016 (aged 85); Lehi, Utah, U.S.
- Occupation(s): Economist, author
- Spouse: Kay Felt (m. 1955)
- Children: 14

Howard Joseph Ruff (December 27, 1930 – November 12, 2016) was a financial adviser and writer of the pro-hard money investing newsletter The Ruff Times. Ruff was the author of Famine and Survival in America (1974), How to Prosper During the Coming Bad Years (1979), Survive and Win in the Inflationary Eighties (1981), Making Money (1984), and other books. He updated and re-released his most successful book, re-titling it How to Prosper During the Coming Bad Years in the 21st Century (2008).

== Career ==
Ruff advised investors to avoid stocks and bonds and instead to put their portfolios into gold, silver, platinum group metals, and collectibles such as art and numismatic coins. He also advised his readers to store a year's supply of food in preparation for hard times. Ruff believed (as of his 1979–1981 writings) that the United States was headed for a hyperinflationary economic depression and that there was a danger that both government and private pension plans were about to collapse.

In the late 1970s and early 1980s, Ruff hosted a syndicated television show called Ruff House.

During the 2008 financial crisis, Ruff began appearing on CNBC making economic predictions that were similar to those he had made in the 1970s and 1980s.

Ruff gained a sizable mainstream audience for a while during the late 1970s until about 1981, because those who had been taking his investment advice and buying precious metals saw large capital gains during that period. The New York Times labeled Howard Ruff "The Prophet of Doom" after his book How to Prosper During the Coming Bad Years reached the number #1 seller in 1979. His popularity fell off after the peak in the gold and silver speculative bubble in 1980.

Ruff raised money to oppose the election of Hillary Clinton to the U.S. Senate in 2000.

Ruff was a member of the Church of Jesus Christ of Latter-day Saints. In How to Prosper During the Coming Bad Years (1979), he relates that his recommendation of food storage is in accord with a policy of the Church of Jesus Christ of Latter-day Saints.

Ruff has also been involved in other endeavors such as a vinyl LP record album of his singing.

Ruff has also been cited on various occasions by Kiplinger's Personal Finance magazine.

Ruff died from complications of age-related diseases in Lehi, Utah, at the age of 85.

== Bibliography ==
- Famine and Survival in America. 1974.
- How to Prosper During the Coming Bad Years: A Crash Course in Personal Financial Survival. 1978.
- Howard Ruff from A to Z. 1980.
- Survive and Win in the Inflationary Eighties. 1981.
- How to Prosper During the Coming Bad Years. 1984.
- Making Money: Winning the battle for middle-class financial success. 1984.
- How to Prosper During the Hard Times Ahead: A Crash Course for the American Family in the Troubled New Millennium. 1999.
- Safely Prosperous or Really Rich: Choosing Your Personal Financial Heaven. 2004.
- Ruff's Little Book of Big Fortunes in Gold & Silver: A Middle Class License to Print Money. 2006.
- How to Prosper During the Coming Bad Years in the 21st Century. 2008.
- How to Prosper in the Age of Obamanomics: A Ruff Plan for Hard Times Ahead. 2009.

== See also ==
- Survivalism
- Retreat (survivalism)
