= Barton Biggs =

American money manager (1932–2012)

- Born: Barton Michael Biggs; November 26, 1932
- Died: July 14, 2012 (aged 79)
- Education: Yale University; New York University
- Occupation: Investor
- Known for: Founder of Morgan Stanley Investment Management, Predictor of dot-com bubble

Barton Michael Biggs (November 26, 1932 – July 14, 2012) was an American financial advisor whose attention to emerging markets marked him as one of the world's first and foremost global investment strategists, a position he held—after inventing it in 1985—at Morgan Stanley, where he worked as a partner for over 30 years. Following his retirement in 2003, he founded Traxis Partners, a multibillion-dollar hedge fund, based in Greenwich, Connecticut. He is best known for accurately predicting the dot-com bubble in the late 1990s.

== Early life and education ==
Biggs was born on November 26, 1932, in New York City, named for his maternal grandmother, whose last name was Barton. He grew up on Manhattan's Upper East Side and in Washington, D.C. His paternal grandfather, Hermann M. Biggs, was the top public-health official in New York and instituted measures that contributed to the eradication of tuberculosis. Biggs' father was the chief investment officer of Bank of New York, working at the company from 1931 until his death in 1974. He also renegotiated defense contracts for the U.S. government during World War II and was executive committee chairman of the Brookings Institution. He attended the Lawrenceville School in New Jersey and graduated in 1951.

Biggs enrolled at Yale University, his father's alma mater. He studied under poet and novelist Robert Penn Warren as an English major and was a member of the Elihu secret society. After graduating in 1955, Biggs served in the U.S. Marines for three years, taught English at the Landon School, a prep school in Bethesda, Maryland, played semiprofessional soccer, and tried his hand at creative writing.

At age 18, Biggs was given a portfolio of 15 company shares worth about $150,000, but he showed little interest in finance and investing in his youth. He ended up choosing that career path after feeling left out from conversations between his father and younger brother, Jeremy, who worked at a pension fund. He took his father's advice and read Security Analysis by Benjamin Graham and David Dodd, first published in 1934. He graduated from NYU Stern School of Business with distinction.

== Career ==
Biggs joined E. F. Hutton upon graduation in 1961, with a starting salary of $7,200 a year. In 1965, Biggs co-founded one of the industry's first hedge funds, Fairfield Partners. During his eight-year tenure there, the fund returned 133 percent; whereas the S&P 500 returned a mere 19 percent.

Biggs joined Morgan Stanley as a managing director and general partner in May 1973. As the firm's first research director, he established Morgan Stanley Investment Management in 1975. Biggs served on the bank's board until 1996 and retired from the company in 2003 at age 70. He claimed to have left Morgan Stanley partly because his job had evolved into managing people rather than formulating strategy.

After leaving Morgan Stanley in 2003, Biggs founded hedge fund Traxis Partners, where he remained until his death. According to Madhav Dhar, Biggs' partner, he enjoyed the intellectual challenge of running a fund.

== Financial predictions ==
=== Dot-com bubble ===
He "sealed his fame" as an investor when he correctly identified the dot-com bubble at a time the Dow Jones Industrial Average was posting annual gains that had averaged 25 percent from 1995 to 1999. In a July 1999 interview in Bloomberg Television, Biggs called the U.S. stock market "the biggest bubble in the history of the world", a view that was dismissed by the industry until March 2000, when the Nasdaq Composite Index dropped 78 percent.

=== 2008 financial crisis ===
Barton Biggs was blindsided by the 2008 financial crisis:

Barton Biggs's Traxis Fund LP tumbled 10 percent in the first half of the year, hurt by bets that U.S. shares would appreciate. As recently as May, Biggs, 75, said the U.S. economy will grow in the second half of 2008, the Standard & Poor's 500 Index may climb to a record and commodity prices will retreat as much as 30 percent.

However, he correctly called the bottom in U.S. stocks in March 2009, and that year Traxis's flagship fund returned three times the industry average.

=== Other predictions ===
He had predicted the bull market in U.S. stocks that began in 1982. He also predicted the bearish market in Japanese stocks in 1989, when the Nikkei 225 stock index was approaching its peak, from which it tumbled more than 77 percent. On the other hand, he was incorrectly bullish on Mexico shortly before the peso crashed in 1994. In March 2003, Biggs predicted that U.S.stocks would rise up to 50 percent, and more for emerging markets; the former climbed as much as 88 percent, while the MSCI Emerging Markets Index rose more than fourfold.

== Awards and accolades ==
His influence could be seen when, in 1996, some traders were surprised that India funds suddenly became popular. "Barton Biggs is there, having a look around", one trader said. "Do you need to know more?" Biggs was named by Institutional Investor magazine to its "All-America Research Team" ten times, and was voted the top global strategist and first in global asset allocation from 1996 to 2000 by the magazine's "Investor Global Research Team" poll. SmartMoney magazine once called him "the ultimate big-picture man ... the premier prognosticator on the international scene and a mover of markets from Argentina to Hong Kong. It wouldn't be a stretch to say Biggs wrote the book on emerging-market investing".

Biggs appeared numerous times on CNBC and was a member of the Barron's Roundtable.

The fitness center at Morgan Stanley’s global headquarters in Manhattan is named in Biggs’s honor.

== Personal life ==
Biggs and his wife, Judith Anne Lund had three children; the marriage ended in divorce. At the time of his death, Biggs lived in Connecticut. He died from complications arising from a bacterial infection. His niece, Fiona Katharine Biggs, a Barnard College graduate, is married to the billionaire hedge fund manager Stanley Druckenmiller.

== Author ==
Biggs was the author of Hedgehogging, which came from a journal kept by the former creative writing major at Yale and chronicles some of the indignities of being in the hedge fund business as well as its "very brilliant and often eccentric and obsessive people". He wrote about quirks of hedge fund culture; he noted that golf was very popular, perhaps due to its "measurable" nature similar to investing. "Or", he wrote, "maybe it's because hedge-fund guys are so competitive and have such massive egos".

Biggs was also author of the 2008 book Wealth, War and Wisdom. He had a gloomy outlook for the economic future, and suggests that investors take survivalist measures, such as looking into "polar cities" as safe refuges for future survivors of global warming. Biggs recommended that his readers should "assume the possibility of a breakdown of the civilized infrastructure". He went so far as to recommend planning adaptation strategies now and setting up survival retreats: "Your safe haven must be self-sufficient and capable of growing some kind of food", Mr. Biggs wrote. "It should be well-stocked with seed, fertilizer, canned food, wine, medicine, clothes, etc. Think Swiss Family Robinson. Even in America and Europe there could be moments of riot and rebellion when law and order temporarily completely breaks down."

In 2010, Biggs published a novel about the stock market, A Hedge-Fund Tale. In 2012, a final book, "Diary of a Hedgehog" was published posthumously on November 6.
