= Systemic Shock (book) =

1981 novel by Dean Ing

Systemic Shock by Dean Ing is the first novel in his Quantrill trilogy (the others are Wild Country and Single Combat) and is a science fiction thriller set in the mid-1990s. After the Soviet Union collapses, as a consequence of the events described in General Sir John Hackett's book The Third World War (1978) in August 1985, China and India form a "Sino-Ind" coalition and launch a devastating nuclear attack on America.

== Plot ==
The book is based around Ted Quantrill and his activities during an episode of post-apocalyptic anarchy that followed the limited nuclear exchange which destroyed the major cities in the United States during World War IV. Utah's Mormons gain political ascendancy and buttressed by its newfound mineral abundance as the Arctic defrosts, Canada becomes a superpower. Quantrill becomes a covert operative and infiltrates a polygamist fundamentalist schismatic Mormon compound.

== Sequels ==
In Single Combat, Quantrill joins the resistance against President Young's increasingly theocratic Mormons and the maquis succeed in overthrowing him. In Wild Country, Quantrill has become a US marshal on the border between an enlarged Mexico and post-apocalyptic Texas, but anarchic elements still persist in the area, which he must curtail.

== Reception ==
Greg Costikyan reviewed Systemic Shock in Ares magazine #11 and commented that "The fact that the story is less than plausible does not distract from its value; Systemic Shock is still an interesting book, albeit not for the fainthearted."

== Reviews ==
- Review by Peter J. Andrews (1981) in Beyond, Fall 1981
- Review by Bob Mecoy (1981) in Future Life, November 1981

== See also ==
- Apocalyptic and post-apocalyptic fiction
- Systemic shock
