= Survivalism =

Movement of individuals or households preparing for emergencies and natural disasters

Survivalism is a social movement of individuals or groups (called survivalists, doomsday preppers or preppers) who proactively prepare for emergencies, such as natural disasters, and other disasters causing disruption to social order (such as civil disorder) caused by political or economic crises. Preparations may anticipate short-term scenarios or long-term, on scales ranging from personal adversity, to local disruption of services, to international or global catastrophe. There is no bright line dividing general emergency preparedness from prepping in the form of survivalism (these concepts are a spectrum), but a qualitative distinction is often recognized whereby preppers/survivalists prepare especially extensively because they have higher estimations of the risk of catastrophes happening. Nonetheless, prepping can be as limited as preparing for a personal emergency (such as losing one's job, storm damage to one's home, or getting lost in wooded terrain), or it can be as extensive as a personal identity or collective identity with a devoted lifestyle.

Survivalism emphasises self-reliance, stockpiling supplies, and gaining survival knowledge and skills. The stockpiling of supplies is itself a wide spectrum, from survival kits (ready bags, bug-out bags) to entire bunkers in extreme cases.

Survivalists often acquire first aid and emergency medical/paramedic/field medicine training, self-defense training (martial arts, ad hoc weaponry, firearm safety), and improvisation/self-sufficiency training, and they often build structures (survival retreats, underground shelters, etc.) or modify/fortify existing structures etc. that may help them survive a catastrophic failure of society.

Use of the term survivalist dates from the early 1980s.

== History ==
=== 1930s to 1950s ===
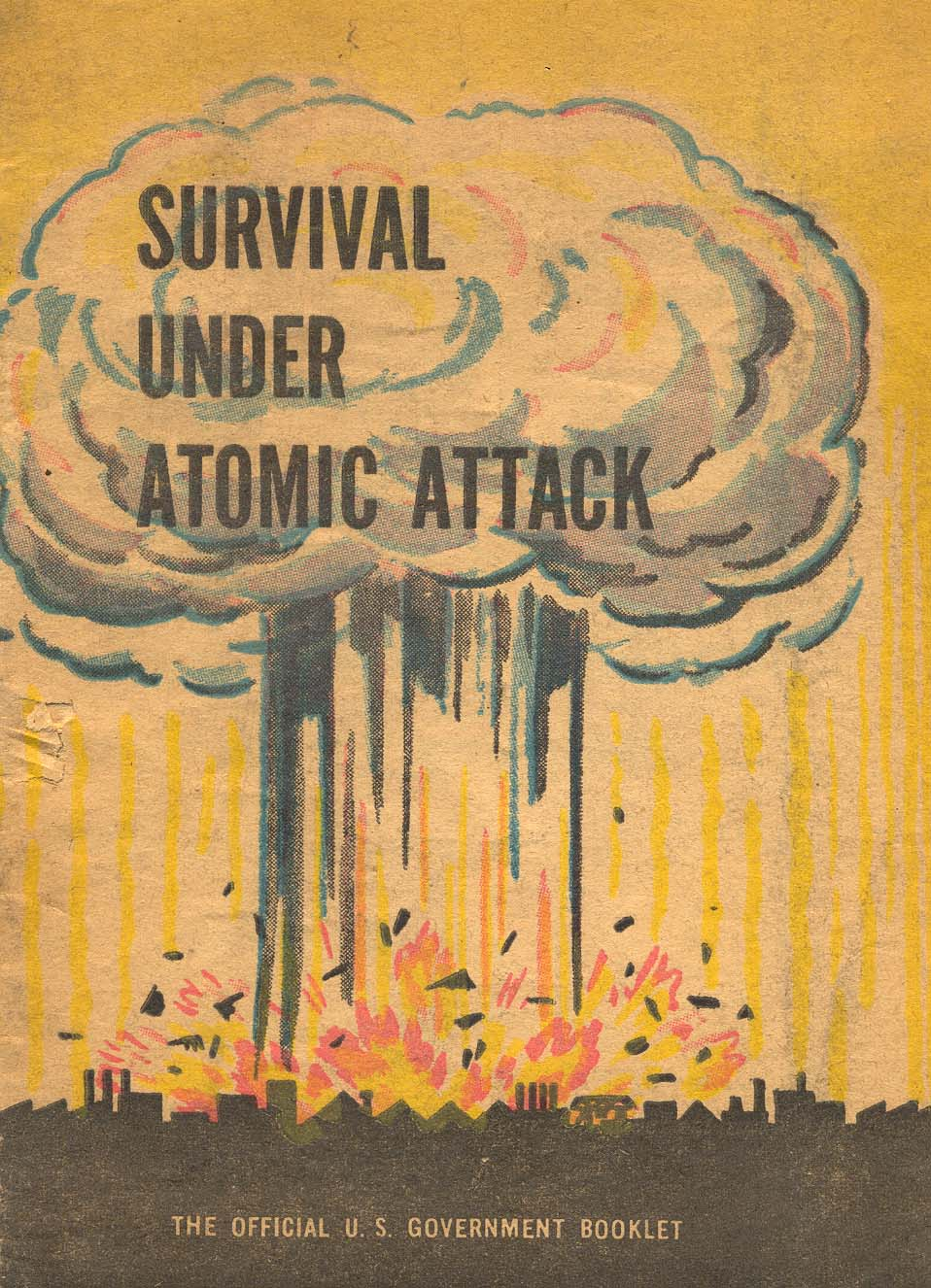
1950 booklet Survival Under Atomic Attack, a civil defense publication

The origins of the modern survivalist movement in the United Kingdom and the United States include government policies, threats of nuclear warfare, religious beliefs, and writers who warned of social or economic collapse in both non-fiction and apocalyptic and post-apocalyptic fiction.

The Cold War era civil defense programs promoted public atomic bomb shelters, personal fallout shelters, and training for children, such as the Duck and Cover films. The Church of Jesus Christ of Latter-day Saints (LDS Church) has long directed its members to store a year's worth of food for themselves and their families in preparation for such possibilities, and the current teaching advises beginning with at least a three-month supply.

The Great Depression that followed the Wall Street Crash of 1929 is cited by survivalists as an example of the need to be prepared.

=== 1960s ===
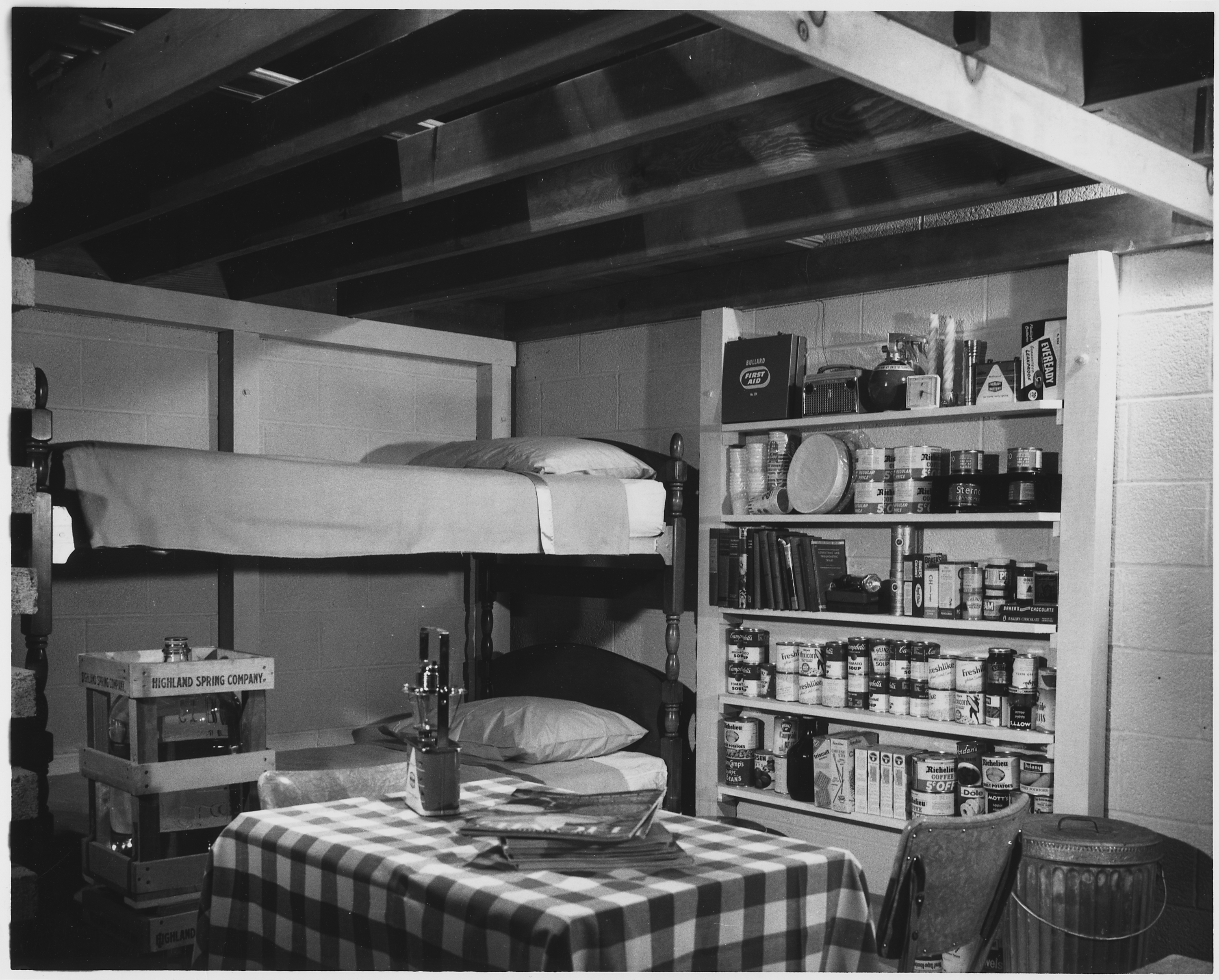
Basement family fallout shelter, c. 1957

The increased inflation rate in the 1960s, the US monetary devaluation, the continued concern over a possible nuclear exchange between the US and the Soviet Union, and perceived increasing vulnerability of urban centers to supply shortages and other systems failures caused a number of primarily conservative and libertarian thinkers to promote individual preparations. Harry Browne began offering seminars on how to survive a monetary collapse in 1967, with Don Stephens (an architect) providing input on how to build and equip a remote survival retreat. He gave a copy of his original Retreater's Bibliography to each seminar participant.

Articles on the subject appeared in small-distribution libertarian publications such as The Innovator and Atlantis Quarterly. It was during this period that Robert D. Kephart began publishing Inflation Survival Letter (later renamed Personal Finance). For several years the newsletter included a continuing section on personal preparedness written by Stephens. It promoted expensive seminars around the US on similar cautionary topics. Stephens participated, along with James McKeever and other defensive investing, "hard money" advocates.

=== 1970s ===
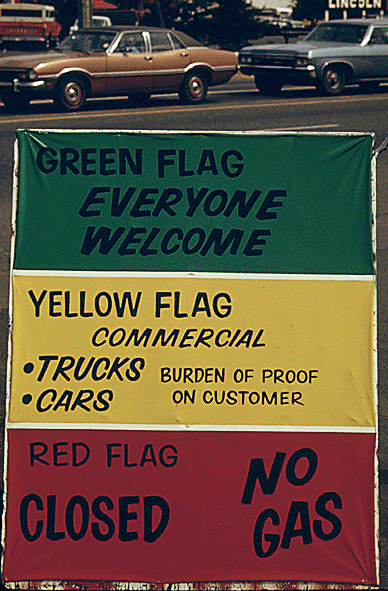
Oregon gasoline dealers displayed signs explaining the flag policy in the winter of 1973–74 during the oil crisis.

In the next decade Howard Ruff warned about socio-economic collapse in his 1974 book Famine and Survival in America. Ruff's book was published during a period of rampant inflation in the wake of the 1973 oil crisis. Most of the elements of survivalism can be found there, including advice on food storage. The book championed the claim that precious metals, such as gold and silver, have an intrinsic worth that makes them more usable in the event of a socioeconomic collapse than fiat currency. Ruff later published milder variations of the same themes, such as How to Prosper During the Coming Bad Years, a best-seller in 1979.

Firearms instructor and survivalist Colonel Jeff Cooper wrote on hardening retreats against small arms fire. In an article titled "Notes on Tactical Residential Architecture" in Issue #30 of P.S. Letter (April 1982), Cooper suggested using the "Vauban Principle", whereby projecting bastion corners would prevent miscreants from being able to approach a retreat's exterior walls in any blind spots. Depending on the size of the group needing shelter, design elements of traditional European castle architecture, and Chinese Fujian Tulou and Mexican walled courtyard houses, have been suggested for survival retreats.

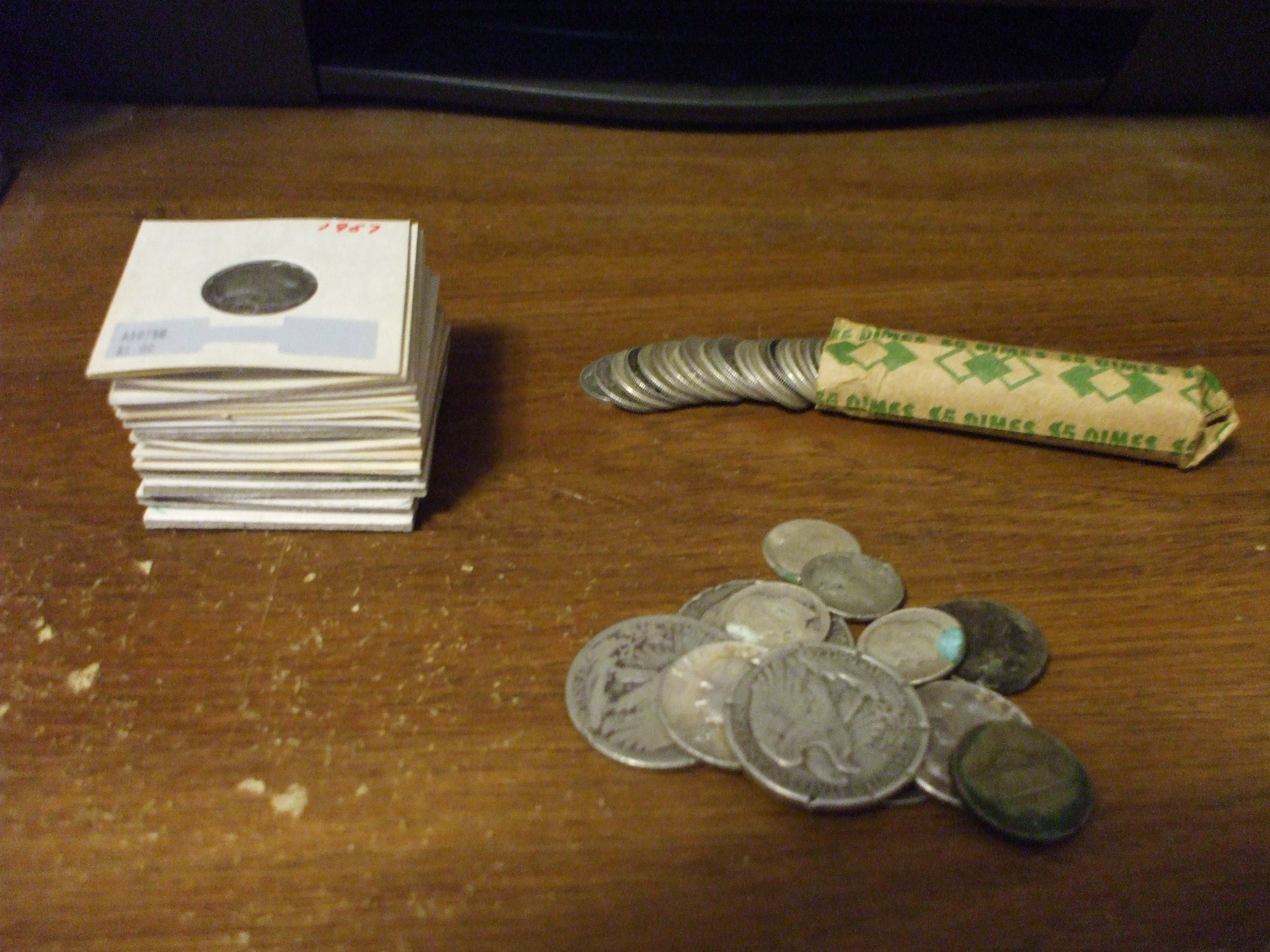
A selection of silver American coins. From the mid-1960s to the 1970s and onward, people began hoarding gold and silver coins to build wealth as a means to mitigate the results of a hyperinflation effect on the economy.

Bruce D. Clayton and Joel Skousen have both written extensively on integrating fallout shelters into retreat homes, but they put less emphasis on ballistic protection and exterior perimeter security than Cooper and Rawles.

Other newsletters and books followed in the wake of Ruff's first publication. In 1975, Kurt Saxon began publishing a monthly tabloid-size newsletter called The Survivor, which combined Saxon's editorials with reprints of 19th century and early 20th century writings on various pioneer skills and old technologies. Kurt Saxon used the term survivalist to describe the movement, and he claims to have coined the term.

In the previous decade, preparedness consultant, survival bookseller, and California-based author Don Stephens popularized the term retreater to describe those in the movement, referring to preparations to leave cities for remote havens or survival retreats should society break down. In 1976, before moving to the Inland Northwest, he and his wife authored and published The Survivor's Primer & Up-dated Retreater's Bibliography.

For a time in the 1970s, the terms survivalist and retreater were used interchangeably. While the term retreater eventually fell into disuse, many who subscribed to it saw retreating as the more rational approach to conflict-avoidance and remote "invisibility". Survivalism, on the other hand, tended to take on a more media-sensationalized, combative, "shoot-it-out-with-the-looters" image.

One newsletter deemed by some to be one of the most important on survivalism and survivalist retreats in the 1970s was the Personal Survival ("P.S.") Letter (circa 1977–1982). Published by Mel Tappan, who also authored the books Survival Guns and Tappan on Survival. The newsletter included columns from Tappan himself and notable survivalists such as Jeff Cooper, Al J Venter, Bruce D. Clayton, Nancy Mack Tappan, J.B. Wood (author of several gunsmithing books), Karl Hess, Janet Groene (travel author), Dean Ing, Reginald Bretnor, and C.G. Cobb (author of Bad Times Primer). The majority of the newsletter revolved around selecting, constructing, and logistically equipping survival retreats. Following Tappan's death in 1980, Karl Hess took over publishing the newsletter, eventually renaming it Survival Tomorrow.

In 1980, John Pugsley published the book The Alpha Strategy. It was on The New York Times Best Seller list for nine weeks in 1981. After 28 years in circulation, The Alpha Strategy remains popular with survivalists, and is considered a standard reference on stocking food and household supplies as a hedge against inflation and future shortages.

In addition to hardcopy newsletters, in the 1970s survivalists established their first online presence with BBS and Usenet forums dedicated to survivalism and survival retreats.

=== 1980s ===
Further interest in the survivalist movement peaked in the early 1980s, with Howard Ruff's book How to Prosper During the Coming Bad Years and the publication in 1980 of Life After Doomsday by Bruce D. Clayton. Clayton's book, coinciding with a renewed arms race between the United States and Soviet Union, marked a shift in emphasis in preparations made by survivalists away from economic collapse, famine, and energy shortages—which were concerns in the 1970s—to nuclear war. In the early 1980s, science fiction writer Jerry Pournelle was an editor and columnist for Survive, a survivalist magazine, and was influential in the survivalist movement. Ragnar Benson's 1982 book Live Off The Land In The City And Country suggested rural survival retreats as both a preparedness measure and conscious lifestyle change.

=== 1990s ===
Logo created by The President's Council on the Year 2000 Conversion for use on Y2K.gov

Interest in the movement picked up during the Clinton administration due in part to the debate surrounding the Federal Assault Weapons Ban and the ban's subsequent passage in 1994. The interest peaked again in 1999 triggered by fears of the Y2K computer bug. Before extensive efforts were made to rewrite computer programming code to mitigate the effects, some writers such as Gary North, Ed Yourdon, James Howard Kunstler, and investments' advisor Ed Yardeni anticipated widespread power outages, food and gasoline shortages, and other emergencies. North and others raised the alarm because they thought Y2K code fixes were not being made quickly enough. While a range of authors responded to this wave of concern, two of the most survival-focused texts to emerge were Boston on Y2K (1998) by Kenneth W. Royce, and Mike Oehler's The Hippy Survival Guide to Y2K. Oehler is an underground living advocate, who also authored The $50 and Up Underground House Book, which has long been popular in survivalist circles.

=== 2000s ===
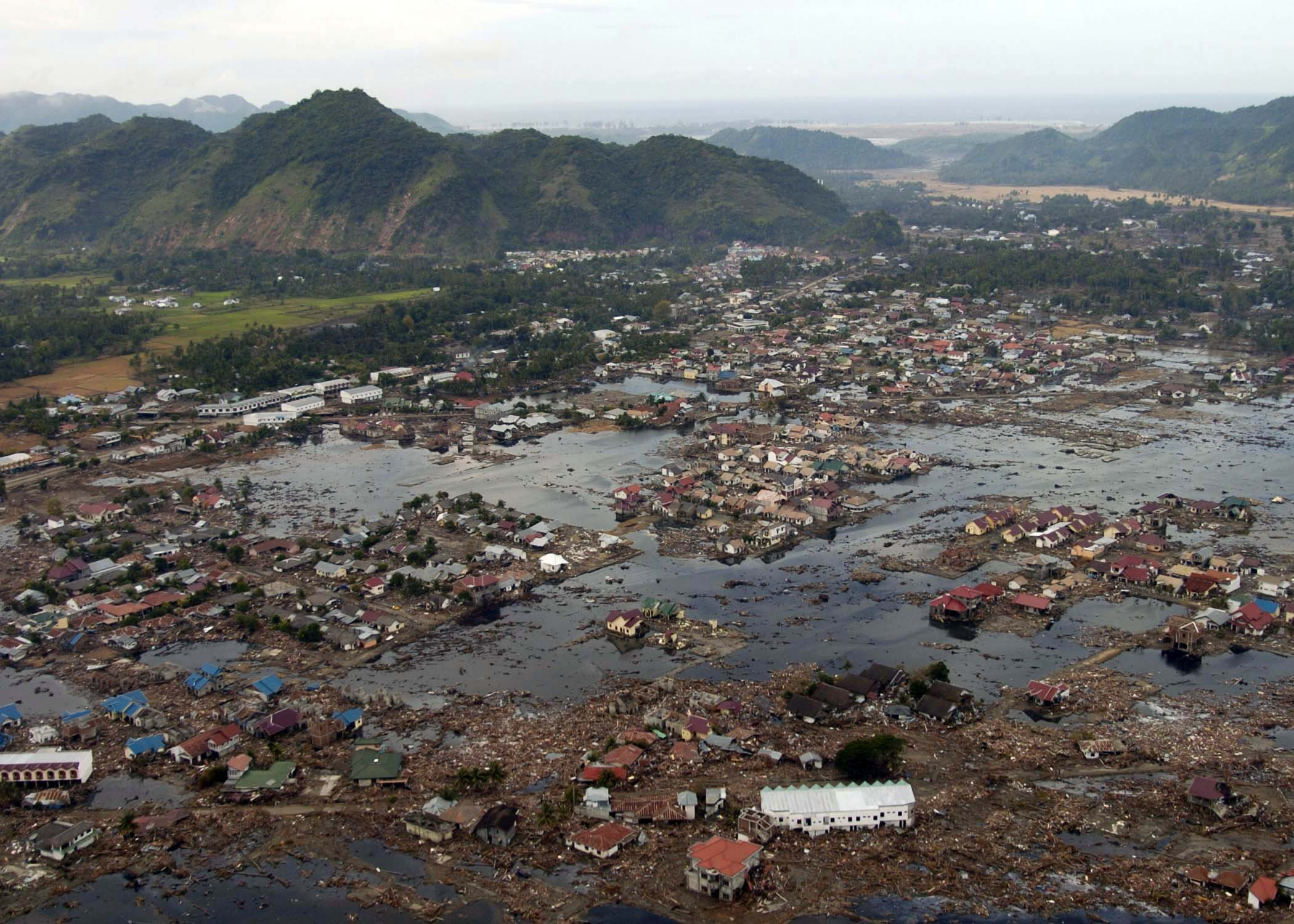
A town near the coast of Sumatra lies in ruin after the 2004 Indian Ocean earthquake and tsunami.

Another wave of survivalism began after the September 11, 2001, attacks and subsequent bombings in Bali, Madrid, and London. This resurgence of interest in survivalism appears to be as strong as the 1970s era focus on the topic. The fear of war, avian influenza, energy shortages, environmental disasters, and global climate change, coupled with economic uncertainty and the apparent vulnerability of humanity after the 2004 Indian Ocean earthquake and tsunami and Hurricane Katrina, have increased interest in survivalism topics.

Many books were published in the wake of the Great Recession from 2008 and later offering survival advice for various potential disasters, ranging from an energy shortage and crash to nuclear or biological terrorism. In addition to the 1970s-era books, blogs and Internet forums are popular ways of disseminating survivalism information. Online survival websites and blogs discuss survival vehicles, survival retreats, emerging threats, and list survivalist groups.

In both his book Rawles on Retreats and Relocation and in his survivalist novel, Patriots: A Novel of Survival in the Coming Collapse, James Wesley Rawles describes in great detail retreat groups "upgrading" brick or other masonry houses to that of a security compound with steel reinforced window shutters and doors, excavating anti-vehicular ditches, installing gate locks, constructing concertina wire obstacles and fougasses, and setting up listening post/observation posts (LP/OPs) Rawles is a proponent of including a mantrap foyer at survival retreats, an architectural element that he calls a "crushroom".

Economic troubles emerging from the credit collapse triggered by the 2007 US subprime mortgage lending crisis and global grain shortages prompted a wider cross-section of the populace to prepare.

The advent of H1N1 Swine Flu in 2009 piqued interest in survivalism, significantly boosting sales of preparedness books and making survivalism more mainstream.

=== 2010s ===
Television shows such as the National Geographic Channel's Doomsday Preppers emerged to capitalize on what Los Angeles Times entertainment contributor Mary McNamara dubbed "today's zeitgeist of fear of a world-changing event".

After the 2012 Sandy Hook Elementary School shooting, the "prepper" community worried they would face public scrutiny after it was revealed the perpetrator's mother was a survivalist. Earlier that year, a double homicide was committed by survivalist Peter Keller, who admitted to killing his wife and daughter in a video diary. He killed himself while evading capture in a bunker he built in Rattlesnake Ridge in King County, Washington. Both were cited by The Christian Science Monitor as examples of survivalism being tied to violence.

=== 2020s ===
During the COVID-19 pandemic, which was declared a Public Health Emergency of International Concern by the World Health Organization in early 2020 and the Russian invasion of Ukraine (2022–present), survivalism has received renewed interest, even by those who are not traditionally considered preppers.

In 2026, progressive political commentator Ta-Nehisi Coates accused the United States of adhering to a "survivalist theory of democracy—one that proposed to erect a shield over one group while providing weaponry to destroy another," largely in reference to the Gaza genocide.

== Outline of scenarios and outlooks ==
Survivalism is approached by its adherents in different ways, depending on their circumstances, mindsets, and particular concerns for the future. The following are characterizations, although most (if not all) survivalists fit into more than one category:

Safety-preparedness-oriented

While some survivalists believe in long-term viability of Western civilization, they learn principles and techniques needed for surviving life-threatening situations that can occur at any time and place. They prepare for such calamities that could result in physical harm or requiring immediate attention or defense from threats. These disasters could be biotic or abiotic. Survivalists combat disasters by attempting to prevent and mitigate damage caused by these factors.

Wilderness survival emphasis

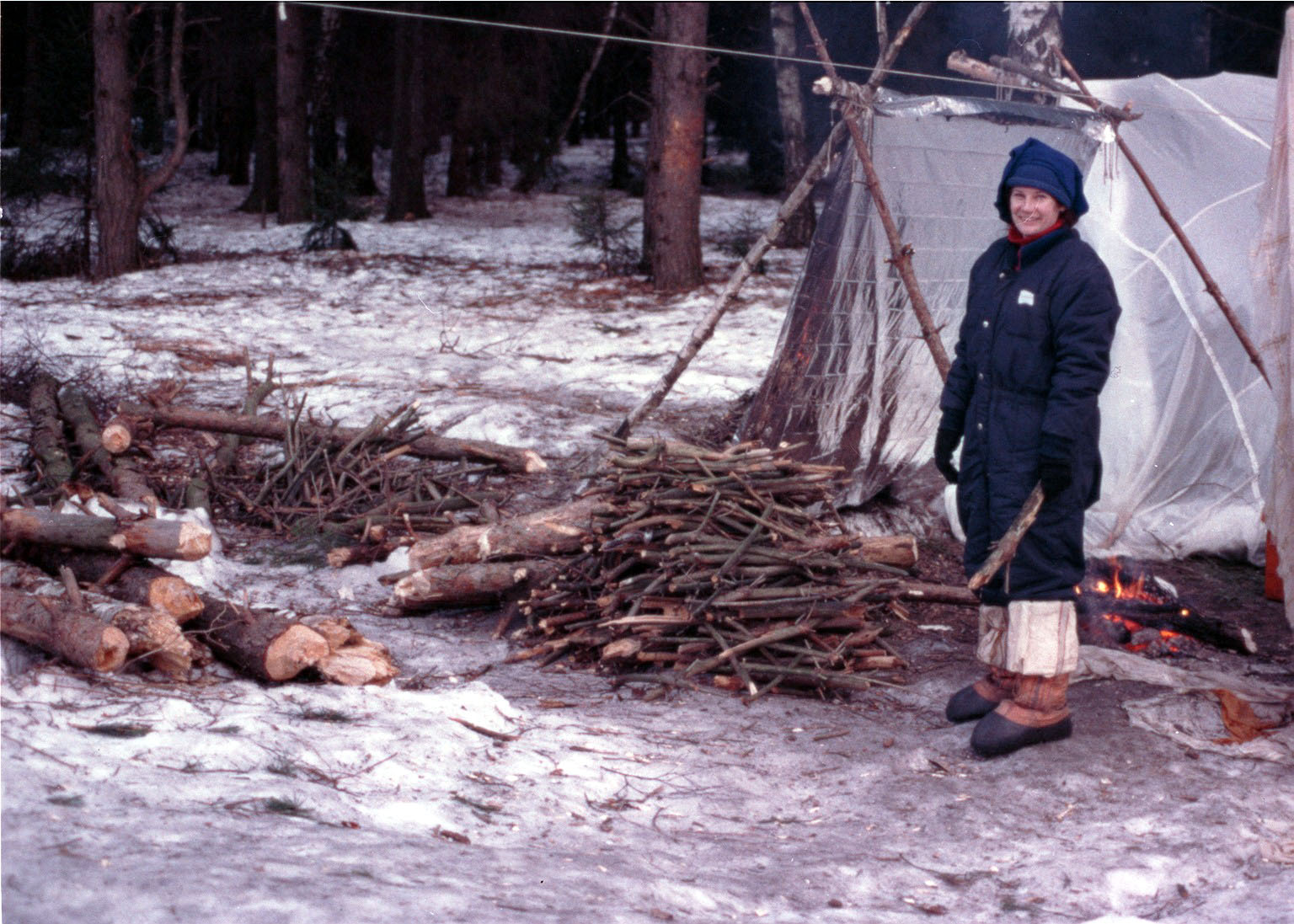
Astronaut Susan Helms gathers firewood during winter survival training.

This group stresses being able to stay alive for indefinite periods in life-threatening wilderness scenarios, including plane crashes, shipwrecks, and being lost in the woods. Concerns are: thirst, hunger, climate, terrain, health, stress, and fear. The rule of 3 is often emphasized as common practice for wilderness survival. The rule states that a human can survive: 3 minutes without air, 3 hours without shelter, 3 days without water, and 3 weeks without food.

Self-defense-driven

This group focuses on surviving brief encounters of violent activity, including personal protection and its legal ramifications, danger awareness, John Boyd's cycle (also known as the OODA loop—observe, orient, decide and act), Combatives, martial arts, unarmed combat, Melee weapons, self-defense tactics and tools (both lethal and non-lethal). These survivalist tactics are often firearm-oriented, in order to ensure a method of defense against attackers or home invasion.

Natural disaster, brief

This group consists of people who live in tornado, hurricane, flood, wildfire, earthquake or heavy snowfall-prone areas and want to be prepared for possible emergencies. They invest in material for fortifying structures and tools for rebuilding and constructing temporary shelters. While assuming the long-term continuity of society, some may have invested in a custom-built shelter, food, water, medicine, and enough supplies to get by until contact with the rest of the world resumes following a natural emergency.

Natural disaster, prolonged

This group is concerned with weather cycles of 2–10 years, which have happened historically and can cause crop failures. They might stock several tons of food per family member and have a heavy-duty greenhouse with canned non-hybrid seeds.

Natural disaster, indefinite/multi-generational

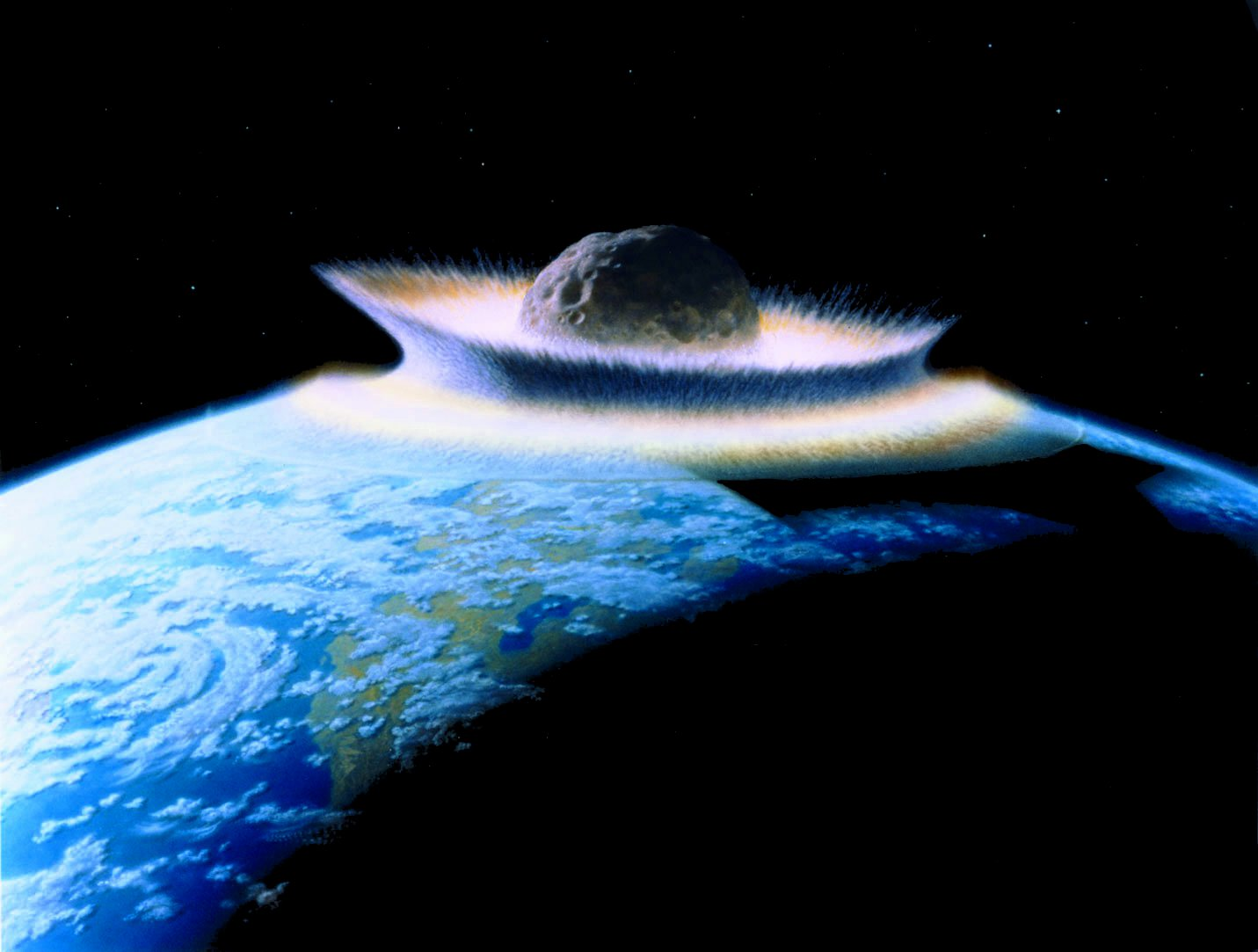
Artistic depiction of a cataclysmic meteor impact

This group considers an end to society as it exists today under possible scenarios including global warming, global cooling, environmental degradation, warming or cooling of gulf stream waters, or a period of severely cold winters caused by a supervolcano, an asteroid strike, or nuclear warfare.

Bio-chem scenario

This group is concerned with the spread of fatal diseases, biological agents, and nerve gases, including COVID-19, swine flu, E. coli, botulism, dengue fever, Creutzfeldt–Jakob disease, SARS, rabies, hantavirus, anthrax, plague, cholera, HIV, ebola, Marburg virus, Lassa virus, sarin, and VX. In response, they might own NBC (nuclear, biological and chemical) full-face respirators, polyethylene coveralls, PVC boots, nitrile gloves, plastic sheeting and duct tape.

Monetary disaster investors

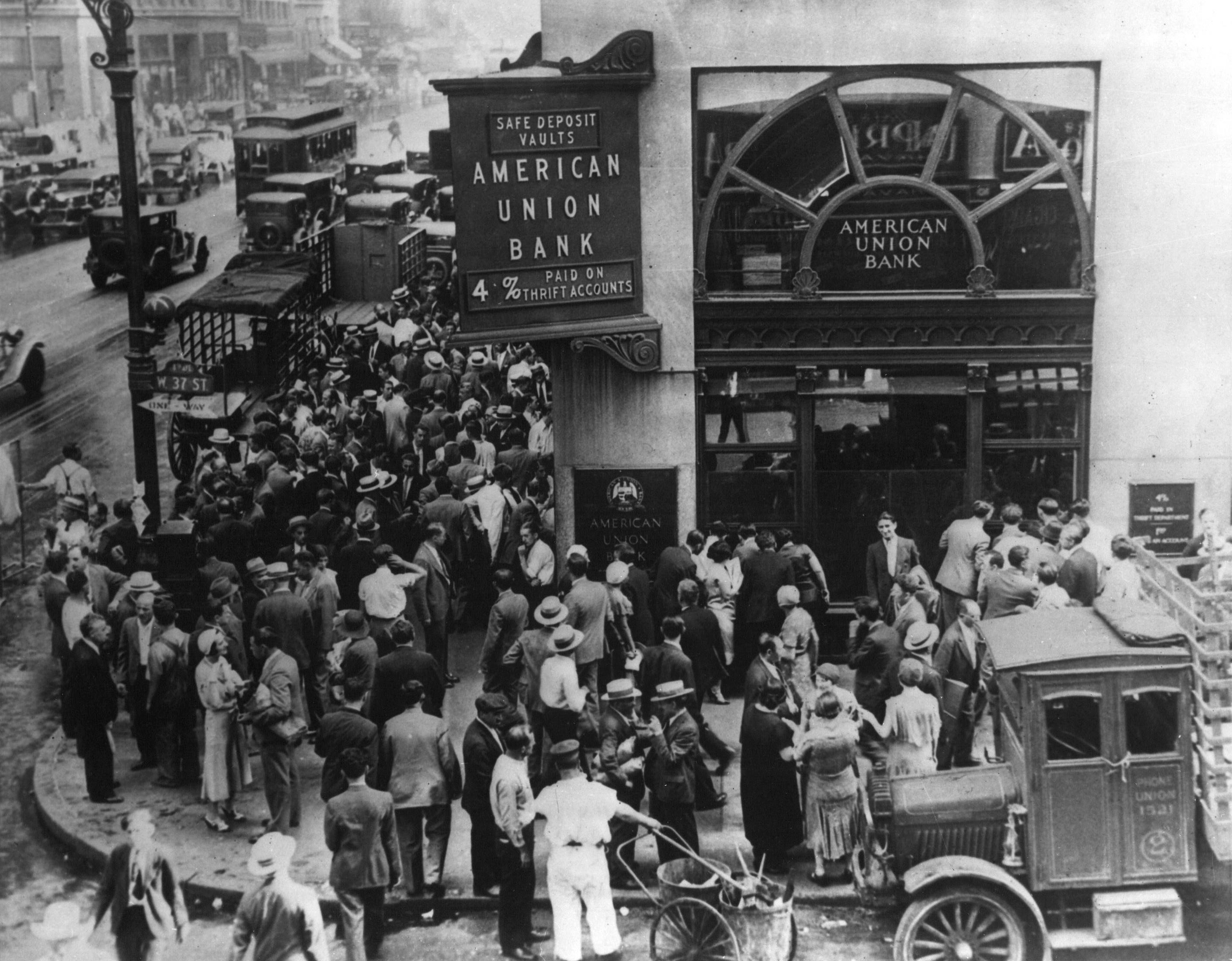
Crowd at New York City American Union Bank during a 1931 bank run early in the Great Depression

Monetary disaster investors believe the Federal Reserve system is fundamentally flawed. Newsletters suggest hard assets of gold and silver bullion, coins, and other precious-metal-oriented investments such as mining shares. Survivalists prepare for paper money to become worthless through hyperinflation. As of late 2009 this is a popular scenario. Many will stockpile bullion in preparation for a market crash that would destroy the value of global currencies.

Biblical eschatologist

These individuals study End Times prophecy and believe that one of various scenarios might occur in their lifetime. While some Christians (and even people of other religions) believe that the Rapture will follow a period of Tribulation, others believe that the Rapture is imminent and will precede the Tribulation ("Pre-Trib Rapture"). There is a wide range of beliefs and attitudes in this group. They run the gamut from pacifist to armed camp, and from having no food stockpiles (leaving their sustenance up to God's providence) to storing decades' worth of food. Members of the Church of Jesus Christ of Latter-day Saints are counseled to store up to two years' worth of food and supplies to aid in the event of a natural disaster or long-term economic hardship, such as unemployment.

Peak-oil doomers

This group believes that peak oil is a near term threat to Western civilization, and take appropriate measures, usually involving relocation to an agriculturally self-sufficient survival retreat.

Legal-continuity-oriented

This group has a primary concern with maintaining some form of legal system and social cohesion after a breakdown in the technical infrastructure of society. They are interested in works like The Postman by David Brin, Lewis Dartnell's The Knowledge: How to Rebuild Our World from Scratch, or Marcus B. Hatfield's The American Common Law: The Customary Law of the American Nation.

== Common preparations ==
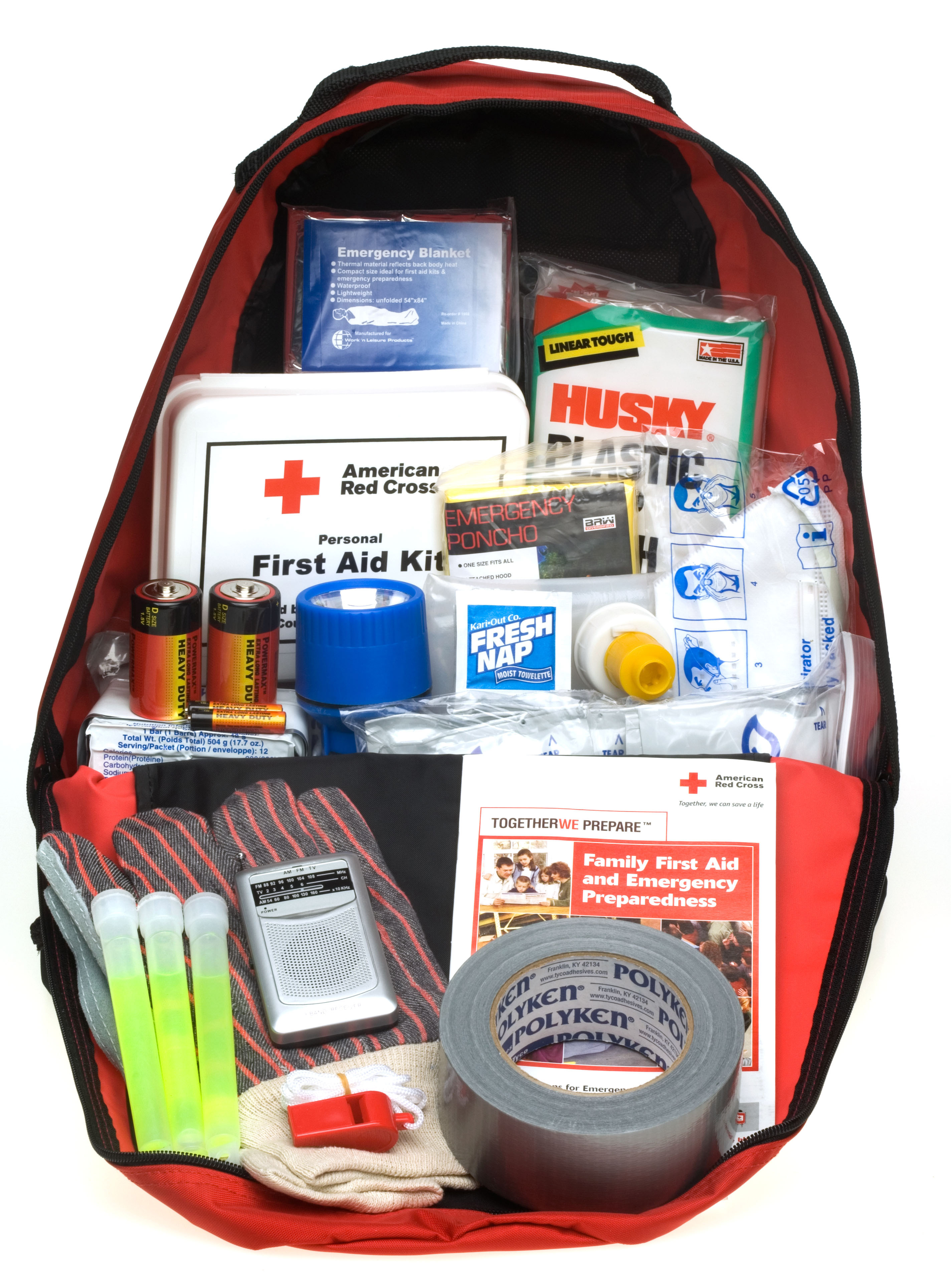
A Red Cross "ready to go" preparedness kit

Common preparations include the creation of a clandestine or defensible retreat, haven, or bug out location (BOL) in addition to the stockpiling of non-perishable food, water (i.e. using water canisters), water-purification equipment, clothing, seed, firewood, defensive or hunting weapons, ammunition, agricultural equipment, and medical supplies. Some survivalists do not make such extensive preparations, and simply incorporate a "Be Prepared" outlook into their everyday life.

A bag of gear, often referred to as a "bug out bag" (BOB) or "get out of dodge" (G.O.O.D.) kit, can be created which contains basic necessities and useful items. It can be of any size, weighing as much as the user is able to carry.

=== Changing concerns and preparations ===
Survivalists' concerns and preparations have changed over the years. During the 1970s, fears were economic collapse, hyperinflation, and famine. Preparations included food storage and survival retreats in the country which could be farmed. Some survivalists stockpiled precious metals and barterable goods (such as common-caliber ammunition) because they assumed that paper currency would become worthless. During the early 1980s, nuclear war became a common fear, and some survivalists constructed fallout shelters.

In 1999, many people purchased electric generators, water purifiers, and several months or even years worth of food in anticipation of widespread power outages because of the Y2K computer-bug. Between 2013 and 2019, many people purchased those same items in anticipation of widespread chaos following the 2016 US election and the events leading up to the COVID-19 pandemic.

Instead of moving or making such preparations at home, many people also make plans to remain in their current locations until an actual breakdown occurs, when they will—in survivalist parlance—"bug out" or "get out of Dodge" to a safer location.

=== Religious beliefs ===
The Horsemen of the Apocalypse, depicted in a woodcut by Albrecht Dürer (c. 1497–98), ride forth as a group, with an angel heralding them, to bring Death, Famine, War and Conquest unto man.

Other survivalists have more specialized concerns, often related to an adherence to apocalyptic religious beliefs.

Some evangelical Christians hold to an interpretation of Bible prophecy known as the posttribulation rapture, in which the world will have to go through a seven-year period of war and global dictatorship known as the "Great Tribulation". Jim McKeever helped popularize survival preparations among this branch of evangelical Christians with his 1978 book Christians Will Go Through the Tribulation, and How To Prepare For It.

Similarly, some Catholics are preppers, based on Marian apparitions which speak of a great chastisement of humanity by God, particularly those associated with Our Lady of Fatima and Our Lady of Akita (which states "fire will fall from the sky and will wipe out a great part of humanity").

=== Mainstream emergency preparations ===
People who are not part of survivalist groups or apolitically oriented religious groups also make preparations for emergencies. This can include (depending on the location) preparing for earthquakes, floods, power outages, blizzards, avalanches, wildfires, terrorist attacks, nuclear power plant accidents, hazardous material spills, tornadoes, and hurricanes. These preparations can be as simple as following Red Cross and U.S. Federal Emergency Management Agency (FEMA) recommendations by keeping a first aid kit, shovel, and extra clothes in the car, or by maintaining a small kit of emergency supplies, containing emergency food, water, a space blanket, and other essentials.

Mainstream economist and financial adviser Barton Biggs is a proponent of preparedness. In his 2008 book Wealth, War and Wisdom, Biggs has a gloomy outlook for the economic future, and suggests that investors take survivalist measures. In the book, Biggs recommends that his readers should "assume the possibility of a breakdown of the civilized infrastructure." He goes so far as to recommend setting up survival retreats: "Your safe haven must be self-sufficient and capable of growing some kind of food," Mr. Biggs writes. "It should be well-stocked with seed, fertilizer, canned food, medicine, clothes, etc. Think Swiss Family Robinson. Even in America and Europe, there could be moments of riot and rebellion when law and order temporarily completely breaks down."

For global catastrophic risks the costs of food storage become impractical for most of the population and for some such catastrophes conventional agriculture would not function due to the loss of a large fraction of sunlight (e.g. during nuclear winter or a supervolcano). In such situations, alternative food is necessary, which is converting natural gas and wood fiber to human edible food. The field of resilient food has matured and now there are dozens of options.

== Survivalist terminology ==
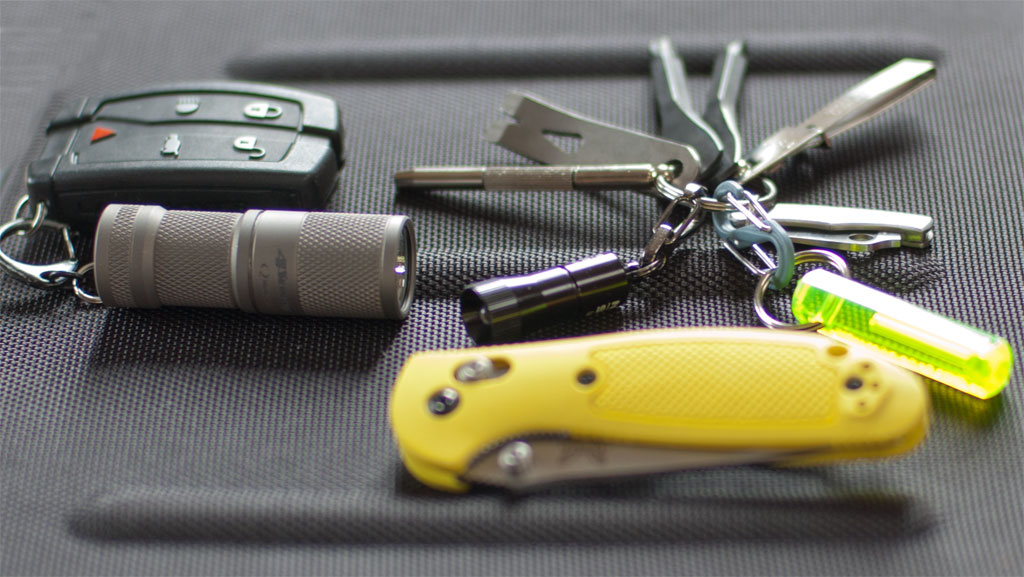
Everyday carry (EDC)

Survivalists maintain their group identity and subculture by using jargon not generally understood outside their circles. They often use government/military/paramilitary acronyms such as OPSEC and SOP, and terminology common among adherents to civilian gun culture or the peak oil scenario. They also use terms which are unique to their own survivalist cells/factions, etc., and even use street slang.

== Media portrayal ==
Despite a lull following the end of the Cold War, survivalism has gained greater attention in recent years, resulting in increased popularity of the survivalist lifestyle, and increased scrutiny. A National Geographic show interviewing survivalists, Doomsday Preppers (2011–2014), was a "ratings bonanza" and "the network's most-watched series", yet Neil Genzlinger in The New York Times declared it an "absurd excess on display and at what an easy target the prepper worldview is for ridicule," noting, "how offensively anti-life these shows are, full of contempt for humankind." Nevertheless, this show occupies a key position in the discourse on preppers.

=== Perceived extremism ===
In popular culture, survivalism has been associated with activities of the self-proclaimed "militias" in the United States and elsewhere. Some survivalists do take active defensive preparations that have militaresque roots and that involve small arms, and this aspect is sometimes emphasized by the mass media. Kurt Saxon is one proponent of this approach to armed survivalism.

The potential for social collapse is often cited as motivation for being well-armed. Thus, some non-militaristic survivalists have developed an unintended quasi-militaristic image.

The U.S. Department of Homeland Security (DHS) in their "If You See Something, Say Something" campaign says that "the public should report only suspicious behavior and situations...rather than beliefs, thoughts, ideas, expressions, associations, or speech...". However, it is alleged that a DHS list of the characteristics of potential domestic terrorists used in law enforcement training includes "Survivalist literature (fictional books such as Patriots and One Second After are mentioned by name)", "Self-sufficiency (stockpiling food, ammo, hand tools, medical supplies)", and "Fear of economic collapse (buying gold and barter items)".

Many governmental agencies, like the U.S. Department of Homeland Security, recommend everyone have emergency food and water in the case of a natural disaster.

== Worldwide groups and organizations ==
Individual survivalist preparedness and survivalist groups and forums—both formal and informal—are popular worldwide, most visibly in Australia, Austria (ÖWSGV), Belgium, Canada, Spain, France, Germany (often organized under the guise of "adventuresport" clubs), Italy, the Netherlands, Sweden, Switzerland, the United Kingdom, South Africa and the United States.

=== Other related groups ===
Adherents of the back-to-the-land movement inspired by Helen and Scott Nearing, sporadically popular in the United States in the 1930s and 1970s (exemplified by The Mother Earth News magazine), share many of the same interests in self-sufficiency and preparedness. Back-to-the-landers differ from most survivalists in that they have a greater interest in ecology and counterculture. Despite these differences, The Mother Earth News was widely read by survivalists and back-to-the-landers during that magazine's early years, and there was some overlap between the two movements.

Anarcho-primitivists (often shortened to "Anprim", "An-Prim", or "AnPrim") share many characteristics with survivalists, most notably predictions of a pending ecological disaster; one of the most famous An-Prims being Theodore Kaczynski. Writers such as Derrick Jensen argue that industrial civilization is not sustainable, and will therefore inevitably bring about its own collapse. Non-anarchist writers such as Daniel Quinn, Joseph Tainter, and Richard Manning also hold this view. Some members of the Men Going Their Own Way subculture also promote off-grid living and believe that modern society is no longer liveable.

== In popular culture ==
Survivalism and survivalist themes have been fictionalized in print, film, and electronic media.

The 1983 film The Survivors starring Walter Matthau, Robin Williams and Jerry Reed, used survivalism as part of its plot. Michael Gross and Reba McEntire played a survivalist married couple in the 1990 film Tremors and its sequels. Both of these films were comedies. The 1988 film Distant Thunder, starring John Lithgow, concerned Vietnam War veterans suffering from post-traumatic stress disorder who, similarly to some survivalists, withdrew to the wilderness.

Several television shows such as Doomsday Castle, Doomsday Preppers, Survivorman, Man vs Wild Man, Woman, Wild, Alone and Naked and Afraid are based on the concept of survivalism.

== See also ==
- List of survivalism topics
