= Roy Masters (commentator) =

Radio commentator (1928–2021)

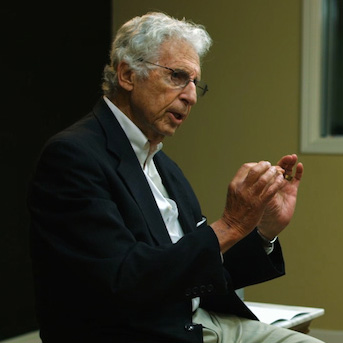
- Masters speaking in Selma, Oregon in May 2014
- Born: Reuben Obermeister; 2 April 1928; London, United Kingdom
- Died: April 22, 2021
- Presenting career
- Show: Advice Line with Roy Masters
- Station: Broadcast on 190 radio stations
- Time slot: 9P.M.–midnight PT Monday-Friday
- Country: United States
- Website: www.fhu.com

Roy Masters (April 2, 1928 – April 22, 2021) was an English-born American author, radio personality, businessman and hypnotist. He was the creator of a type of mindfulness meditation exercise, which has appeared in his books and recordings. Masters was the founder of the Oregon non-profit organization, The Foundation of Human Understanding. His forays into radio broadcasting included his own show, Advice Line, and the Talk Radio Network, a long time popular conservative talk radio syndicator.

== Early life in Britain ==
Roy Masters was born Reuben Obermeister in London in 1928 to a Jewish family of diamond cutters. Like his father, Boris, Masters uses the common anglicisation of his original surname.

Masters' father died in 1943, when Masters was 15 years old. His family could only afford to pay for higher education for his older brother, so Masters did not attend college. He was sent to Brighton, England to apprentice in diamond cutting at his uncle's company, Monnickendam Ltd.

== Career ==
=== Diamond cutting ===
Masters was said in a newspaper article to have served in the Royal Sussex Regiment of the British Army during World War II; however, Masters himself never made this claim in any of his books or on any of his radio broadcasts. (He was only 11 years old when the United Kingdom entered the war. ) He often mentioned that he apprenticed in diamond cutting after the war, but never verbally claimed he did. He pursued his trade of diamond cutting in many places, including Amsterdam; Brussels; Belgium; and Johannesburg in 1947, where he spent two years.

In 1949, Masters emigrated to the United States. In his early twenties, he traveled across America, giving lectures about the topic of diamond cutting in 40 different states. He was invited to participate in radio and TV interviews about the subject, and he briefly hosted a daily radio show which was titled Story of Your Diamond.

Masters developed an interest in hypnosis, and he sold his diamond cutting business to start a new company, the Institute of Hypnosis.

=== Lessons in hypnotism ===
During his early years in Brighton, Masters saw a stage hypnosis presentation in which the hypnotist easily induced volunteer subjects to do strange and outlandish things. Masters remembered pondering the question: "Why can't hypnotism be used to make people act sensibly, rather than foolishly?"

Upon further exploration of hypnotism in the 1950s, Masters repudiated hypnotherapy, but he soon opened the Institute of Hypnosis in Houston. There, he saw as many as 30 clients a day for consultations, and he said he "unhypnotised" them instead of hypnotizing them.

Masters called hypnosis a "duplication of life's errors":

When I was a hypnotist, they used to say to me "You're a hypnotist, are you? When are you going to put me to sleep?" And I would say "Well when are you going to wake up? Because you're already asleep." Hypnosis is an altered state of consciousness...When a person is hypnotized—or reacts to stress, which is the same thing—he's not aware that he's being influenced. And when he is under the influence, he moves and has his being according to somebody else's will. And we don't realize that but when we do realize it, we make excuses. We deny. We deny that somebody else is controlling us other than us. That's our problem.

— Roy Masters, appearance on The Joe Franklin Show

About his decision to change his profession from diamond cutting to hypnosis, Masters said the following in an interview: "I had my own business, but I left that lucrative work because I had a calling for this kind of work. I'm more interested in what I'm doing now than anything else."

Masters set the precedent for the legalization of the non-medical practice of hypnosis when he was charged with practicing medicine without a license at the age of 30. He was sentenced to serve 30 days in jail and was transparent about the experience with his radio listeners. According to Masters, he hypnotized a young girl who had broken her arm to take her pain away until the ambulance arrived. (For the medical practice of hypnotism, see hypnotism precursors, such as Dave Elman.)

=== The Foundation Of Human Understanding ===
Masters lived in Los Angeles, California, buying a house trailer and living in Venice, California in 1961. He later profited from his investment in gold at its price highs in 1980 and he purchased Tall Timber Ranch in Selma, Oregon, and he relocated his family to Grants Pass, Oregon, where he moved the non-profit Foundation of Human Understanding. He produced an observational or meditation recording titled Your Mind Can Keep You Well, which became the title of his radio show and the title of one of his books.

=== Talk radio show ===
In 1961, Masters started a talk radio counseling show, which is currently broadcast with the title Advice Line, as a syndicated program. The show has been on the air continuously since its start. Masters passed his hosting duties to his sons, David and Alan, shortly before his death.

== Media appearances ==
Masters appeared on CNN's Crossfire, Larry King Live, The Sally Jessy Raphael Show, The Sean Hannity Show, and The Drudge Report.

== Personal life and death ==
Masters met and married his wife Ann in Birmingham, Alabama, and they eventually moved to Houston, Texas. The couple had five children.

Masters died in Oregon on April 22, 2021, at age 93.

== Publications ==
- 1964 The Secrets of Life and Death. :Devorss, 1964. ASIN B0007EPZIQ
- 1965 How to Be at Peace With Your Problems. Oregon: Foundation of Human Understanding, 1965. ASIN B0007I59TM
- 1970 Sex, Sin & Solution. Oregon: Foundation of Human Understanding, 1970. ASIN B0006CYIFU
- 1970 (Roy Masters Speaks On) Breaking Free of Psycho-therapy. Oregon: Foundation of Human Understanding, 1970. ASIN B0006C2IRA
- 1972 The Secret of Life. Oregon: Foundation of Human Understanding, 1972 ASIN B0006XQGMW and as Secret of Life. (pbk) 1977. [ASIN: B000KVIIQM]
- 1973 Your Mind Can Keep You Well, Fawcett Publications, 1973. (Mass Market paperback: ASIN B000B58D4O) (Essandess Special Edition, 1968. ASIN B0007F6DEK)
- 1974 (Roy Masters Speaks On) Understanding Meditation. Oregon: Foundation of Human Understanding, 1974, ASIN B000710BE2
- 1975 How to Control Your Emotions. Oregon: Foundation of Human Understanding, 1975. ASIN B0006CJDUA
- 1975 How to Conquer Negative Emotions (with Mel Tappan). Oregon: Foundation of Human Understanding, 1 June 1975. ISBN 978-0-933900-01-1
- 1976 How to Conquer Suffering Without Doctors. Oregon: Foundation of Human Understanding, June 1976. ISBN 978-0-933900-04-2
- 1977 Sex, Sin & Salvation. Oregon: Foundation of Human Understanding, 1977. ASIN B0006XSUVQ
- 1977 No One Has to Die! Oregon: Foundation of Human Understanding, 1977. ASIN B0006COJWM
- 1978 How Your Mind Can Keep You Well Oregon: Foundation of Human Understanding, 1 June 1978. ISBN 978-0-933900-09-7 (Fawcett Crest Book, 1973, ASIN B000MFHWYA)
- 1979 The Satan Principle: Life Itself Is Hypnosis: Self-Defense Lessons to Help You Cope With Everyday Pressure. Oregon: Foundation of Human Understanding, June 1979. ISBN 978-0-933900-02-8 (earlier version: Life Itself Is Hypnosis: The Satan Principle: Self-Defense Lessons to Help You Cope With Everyday Pressure, Foundation Books, 1978. ASIN B000NDXFO)
- 1982 How to Survive Your Parents: And Not Do to Your Children What Your Parents Did to You. Oregon: Foundation of Human Understanding, 1 June 1982. (pbk) ISBN 978-0-933900-10-3
- 1987 Eat No Evil (with Dorothy Baker). Oregon: Foundation of Human Understanding, June 1987. (pbk) ISBN 978-0-933900-12-7
- 1988 Understanding Sexuality: The Mystery of Our Lost Identities (with Dorothy Baker). Oregon: Foundation of Human Understanding, rev. ed., February 1988. ISBN 978-0-933900-13-4
- 1988 Beyond the Known (with Dorothy Baker). Oregon: Foundation of Human Understanding, Rev. Ed., 1 June 1988. ISBN 978-0-933900-03-5
- 1988 The Hypnosis of Life: Self-Defense Lessons to Help You Cope with Every Day Pressure. Oregon: Foundation of Human Understanding, June 1988. ISBN 978-0-933900-05-9
- 1988 The Secret Power of Words: Why Words Affect You So Deeply. Oregon: Foundation of Human Understanding, 1 June 1988. (pbk) ISBN 978-0-933900-14-1
- 1991 Surviving the Comfort Zone (with Dorothy Baker). Oregon: Foundation of Human Understanding, 1 August 1991. ISBN 978-0-933900-15-8
- 1992 Secrets of a Parallel Universe: Why Our Deepest Problems Hold the Key to Ultimate Personal Success and Happiness. Oregon: Foundation of Human Understanding, June 1992. ISBN 978-0-933900-17-2
- 1997 Finding God in Physics: Einstein's Missing Relative (with Bob Just and Dorothy Baker). Oregon: Foundation of Human Understanding, ISBN 978-0-933900-19-6
- 2001 The Adam and Eve Sindrome. Oregon: Foundation of Human Understanding, January 2001. ISBN 978-0-933900-11-0
- 2010 How Your Mind Will Make You Well (an updated version of How Your Mind Can Keep You Well). Oregon: CreateSpace, 1 December 2010 ISBN 1456353330
- 2011 Hypnotic States of Americans: A spiritual survival manual for every American family in a perilous world. Oregon: CreateSpace, 11 May 2011. ISBN 978-1-4609-3902-4
- 2012 Cure Stress: How Your Mind Will Make You Well. Oregon: CreateSpace, 11 December 2012 ISBN 1481221043
