= Don Stephens =

American writer and futurist (d. 2018)

Don Stephens was a futurist, eco-home sustainable designer and author. He has published books in the field of what he terms "optimized self-sufficiency" for a range of uncertain-future scenarios, that is also labeled survivalism by others.

In the 1960s, Stephens popularized the term "retreater" to describe those in the survivalist movement who were making preparations to avoid conflict by leaving populated areas for a pre-established remote survival retreat when or if society broke down. (At that time, this trend was primarily motivated by concerns about monetary collapse arising out of anticipated accelerating monetary inflation.) He also wrote on this topic for Innovator magazine, Inflation Survival Letter, Atlantis Quarterly and Harry Browne's Newsletter, among others. Stephens also contributed the "Safe Shelter & Independent Energy" chapter for The Complete Survival Guide (1983), which was edited by ark Thiffault. In public speaking venues, newsletters, and magazines, Stephens has been associated with Harry Browne, Robert D. Kephart, James McKeever, and Mel Tappan.

Stephens studied architecture at the University of Idaho, and worked in a range of architectural and engineering firms in Idaho, Washington and southern California, before establishing his own eco-home design and consulting practice. From his university days onward, he has explored and evolved techniques of active solar and passive solar heating, solar power, earth-integrated design (earth sheltering), and pioneered uses of a range of "alternative", "natural", and salvaged materials and building techniques in home and retreat construction. These include straw bale, high-density recompressed strawblocks, earth-rammed tires, tire bales, urbanite, rammed earth, rice hulls, salvaged/used carpeting, and the pre-stressed "self-filling" of cement-bonded polystyrene bead insulating concrete forms (ICFs).

Stephens developed (and originated the name for) the Annualized Geo-Solar (AGS) technique for simply and inexpensively capturing/storing the summer sun's heat, for predictable, delayed return six months later, to maintain up to 100% of needed winter warmth, which has drawn particular interest. This grew out of his pioneering work with solar and earth-sheltering, beginning in 1960. On these topics, he has written for Earth-Shelter Digest, Earthtone magazine and The Last Straw. He also prepared a requested paper on AGS for The Global Sustainable Building Conference 2005, in Tokyo, Japan. Stephens also presented this material at a number of conferences and workshops over the years for The American Underground-Space Association, Sol-West, the Northwest Renewable Energy Festival, the International Strawbale Association and the Northwest EcoBuilding Guild, and others.

In keeping with his professional advocacies, he lives in a retrofitted century-old home heated by solar and biomass, utilizes photovoltaics for power generation, drives an electric vehicle, and practices organic gardening, composting and rainwater catchment.

Don Stephens died in February 2018.

== Books ==
- The Survivor's Primer & Up-dated Retreater's Bibliography (1976), ASIN B00072RD7E
- Personal Protection, Here and Now (1975)
- Retreating on a Shoe-string (1975)
- Green Papers (1987)
- The Complete Survival Guide (1983), ISBN 978-0-910676-53-3, (Contributor)

== See also ==
- Annualized geo solar
- Earth sheltering
- Retreat (survivalism)
- Survivalism
- Sustainable design
- Mel Tappan
