= Mel Tappan =

American survivalist movement leader (1933–1980)

- Born: Melrose H. Tappan III; 1933; Texas, U.S.
- Died: November 2, 1980 (aged 47); Rogue River, Oregon, U.S.
- Education: Stanford University
- Occupations: Writer, editor
- Spouse: Nancy Mack Tappan
- Writing career
- Genres: Survivalism, firearms, self-sufficiency
- Notable works: Survival Guns, Tappan on Survival, Personal Survival Letter

Mel Tappan (born Melrose H. Tappan III; 1933–1980) was the editor of the newsletter Personal Survival ("P.S.") Letter and the books Survival Guns and Tappan on Survival. Tappan was an influential leader of the Survivalist movement who advocated relocation to survival retreats in lightly populated regions.

== Emergence as survivalist expert ==
After attending Stanford University, Tappan first worked in finance. Tappan developed an ever-growing expertise in firearms while living in Los Angeles. He contacted Don Stephens after reading the "Personal Preparedness" columns by Stephens in Inflation Survival Letter. Tappan was invited to present a lecture as part of Stephens' "Seminars On Survival" (SOS) dinner series, giving him greater public presence and recognition. In the same time period, he collaborated with Roy Masters on writing and editing the book How to Conquer Negative Emotions (1975). He was also the editor of the 1977 book A Guide to Handmade Knives and The Official Directory of the Knifemakers Guild.

He then wrote a monthly column on survival topics titled "Survival Notes" for Guns & Ammo magazine. Shortly before his death, he also wrote a few monthly columns as the Survival Editor for Soldier of Fortune magazine. Through these publications and his 1977 book Survival Guns – which as of 2010 is still in print after more than 32 years – he became an influential spokesman of the "armed-defense" wing of the Survivalist movement. The back cover of Survival Guns quotes Laura Cunningham of The New York Times as describing Tappan as "The Survivalist voice of reason."

== Newsletter editor ==
Tappan published what is perhaps the most important newsletter on survivalism and survivalist retreats in the 1970s, the Personal Survival ("P.S.") Letter. It was published from 1977 to 1982. The newsletter included columns from Tappan himself as well from Jeff Cooper, Al J. Venter, Bill Pier, Bruce D. Clayton, Rick L. Fines (aka "Ross Lee"), Nancy Mack Tappan, J.B. Wood, Dr. Carl Kirsch, Charles Avery, Karl Hess, Eugene A. Barron, Janet Groene, Dean Ing, Alexander Jason, James McKeever, Kurt Saxon, Bob Taylor, Reginald Bretnor, C.G. Cobb, Carl E. Krupp, and several other writers, some under pen names (such as "Dr. J.M. Browning"). The majority of this newsletter revolved around selecting, constructing and logistically equipping survival retreats. Following Tappan's death in 1980, Nancy Tappan took over the newsletter, renaming it Survival Tomorrow in 1983. In 1987 Carl E. Krupp became the new editor and publisher. The more recent survivalist author James Wesley Rawles credits Personal Survival Letter and Tappan's books as the primary influences in the development of his survivalist philosophy as well as the impetus for launching SurvivalBlog.com.

== Relocation proponent ==
In his writings, Tappan encouraged survivalists to relocate to and prepare survival retreats in lightly populated regions, and did so himself, moving to Rogue River, Oregon, for the last years of his life. He is best known for his 1977 book Survival Guns. The subsequent book Tappan on Survival – based on his magazine and Personal Survival newsletter articles – was published shortly after his death (November 2, 1980) from congestive heart failure at age 47. The book was reissued by Paladin Press in 2006 with a new foreword by Bruce D. Clayton.

Mel Tappan was quoted in 1981 by then AP correspondent Peter Arnett that: "The concept most fundamental to long term disaster preparedness, in retreating, is having a safe place to go to avoid the concentrated violence destined to erupt in the cities. When you have a growing apprehensive awareness that the time grows short for you to relocate away from areas of greatest danger, then choose [where you will live] carefully." Tappan also said that he was disappointed by the demographics of southwestern Oregon after the influx of survivalists in the late 1970s. "Too many doctors and lawyers" relocated to Oregon, he said, but "not enough plumbers, electricians, or carpenters."

He was married to Nancy Mack Tappan, who was his constant companion, administrative assistant, editor and most loyal supporter.

== Death and legacy ==
Tappan was born with a tumor on his spine and spent his life in braces, on crutches and finally in a wheelchair. He died in 1980.

Tappan was outlived by his father, Melrose H. Tappan Jr., who died December 12, 1988, and his mother LaVeda Mae Potter Tappan, who died in 1997. His grandfather, Melrose H. Tappan Sr., died January 4, 1960. All were buried at West Hill Cemetery, in Sherman, Grayson County, Texas.

To honor her late husband, Nancy Mack Tappan endowed Austin College (in the Northeast Texas town of Sherman) with the Melrose H. Tappan Jr. and Melrose H. Tappan III Presidential Scholarship.

After Mel Tappan's death, his widow stayed on in the Rogue River Valley. As recently as 2010, she was still active in survivalism. In the late 1990s in partnership with her friend Vernon Hixson, she started a large wine vineyard called Evans Creek and Venture Vineyards, on a 60-acre (240,000 m^{2}) parcel. In 2009, she was a board member of the Grants Pass Irrigation District. In June 2010, she became editor of a self-sufficiency and preparedness magazine called The New Pioneer and "The Old Farmer's Almanac", from Harris Publications.

== Continuing influence ==
Tappan's writings remain popular and influential in survivalist circles. A new edition of his book Tappan on Survival (with a foreword by Bruce D. Clayton) was released in 2009, and as of December 2009 ranks in Amazon's top 90,000 books (out of more than four million titles). Survival Guns also recently went back into print. Both books are published by Paladin Press.

== See also ==
- Ragnar Benson
- Reginald Bretnor
- Bruce D. Clayton
- Jeff Cooper
- Dean Ing
- Karl Hess
- Roy Masters
- James Wesley Rawles
- Retreat (survivalism)
- Kurt Saxon
- Don Stephens
