= Reginald Bretnor =

American novelist (1911–1992)

- Born: Alfred Reginald Kahn; July 30, 1911; Vladivostok, Russia
- Died: July 22, 1992 (aged 80); Medford, Oregon, U.S.
- Occupation: Novelist

Reginald Bretnor (born Alfred Reginald Kahn; July 30, 1911 – July 22, 1992) was an American science fiction editor and author, and contributor on warfare and other subjects, who published substantial work between the 1950s and 1980s. Bretnor worked extensively both to write science fiction and to edit science and science fiction-related compendia (e.g., his trilogy of symposia beginning with Science Fiction Today and Tomorrow: A Discursive Symposium (1975), and he edited some of the earliest books to consider science fiction from the perspective of literary theory and criticism. His non-fiction included works on military history, theory, and futurology (e.g., his trilogy on The Future of War, beginning 1979), as well as on public affairs. Most of Bretnor's own fiction, science fiction and otherwise, was in short story form, and often featured whimsical story lines or ironic plot twists.

== Early life and education ==
Reginald Bretnor was born on July 30, 1911, in Vladivostok, in the Russian empire. Bretnor's father, Grigory Kahn, has alternatively been described as a "Latvian Jewish banker", and a Russian Jew, and his mother, her name not yet identified in a biographical source, alternatively as an English governess, and one born British that became a Russian subject. Bretnor's family left Siberia for Japan, spending from 1917 to 1920 there, then moving to San Diego, California. Al least one other source states it was his mother that settled them—she, and the children Reginald and Margaret—in the United States, in 1920.

== Military and governmental service ==
According to papers in the SOHS Archives, Bretnor's military background included service in the last cavalry unit in the U.S. Army. Health issues led to his discharge in August 1941. He tried to reenlist in 1942, but was rejected. He was hired by the Office of War Information to write propaganda to be sent to Japan, and papers related to his work are held in the SOHS Archives. After World War II, Bretnor worked for the U.S. State Department until ill health once again caused him to resign.

== Literary career ==
Bretnor contributed substantial work as an American science fiction author and editor between the 1950s and 1980s. As well, Bretnor worked extensively to edit science and science fiction-related compendia, and he edited some of the earliest books to consider science fiction from the perspective of literary theory and criticism.

Bretnor wrote and edited extensively in the area of non-fiction, including substantial works on military theory, and some on public affairs. He wrote multiple articles, including on cats, and he translated Les Chats, the first known book about cats, written by Moncrif in 1727.

== Bibliography ==
=== Papa Schimmelhorn series ===
- The Gnurrs Come from the Voodvork Out (short story, 1950), a Retro-Hugo Best Short Story award nominee for 1951.
- Little Anton (novelette, 1951).
- Papa Schimmelhorn and the S.O.D.O.M. Serum (1973).
- Count Von Schimmelhorn and the Time-Pony (novella, 1974).
- The Ladies of Beetlegoose Nine (novella, 1976).
- Papa Schimmelhorn's Yang (novelette, 1978).
- The Schimmelhorn File: Memoirs of a Dirty Old Genius (collection, 1979).
- Schimmelhorn's Gold (novel, 1986).
- Nobelist Schimmelhorn (novelette, 1987).

=== Symposia on science fiction ===
Reginald Bretnor organised and edited several substantial volumes, inviting leading SF authors and science writers to contributing essays to his virtual symposia, including the following, discussing the science fiction genre:

- Science Fiction Today and Tomorrow: A Discursive Symposium (1975, with Frederik Pohl, Poul Anderson, Jack Williamson, Ray Bradbury, Hal Clement, Isaac Asimov, Frank Herbert, Hugo Gernsback, Theodore Sturgeon, A. E. van Vogt, Cory Panshin, Larry Niven, James Blish, Harlan Ellison, E. E. Smith)
- The Craft of Science Fiction: A Symposium on Writing Science Fiction and Science Fantasy (1976, with Robert A. Heinlein, Frederik Pohl, Larry Niven, Poul Anderson, Harlan Ellison, Hal Clement, A. E. van Vogt, Frank Herbert, Jerry Pournelle, Isaac Asimov, Jack Williamson, Norman Spinrad)
- Modern Science Fiction: Its Meaning and Its Future (1953, second edition 1979, with John W. Campbell, Jr., Anthony Boucher, Fletcher Pratt, L. Sprague de Camp, Isaac Asimov, Arthur C. Clarke, Philip Wylie, Gerald Heard)

=== Non-fiction anthologies and related works ===
Further volumes Bretnor wrote or organised, again leading to substantial volumes, were on the subject of the military and war. In 1969, Bretnor published Decisive Warfare. Largely unnoticed by his science fiction readership and foreshadowing his Future at War series in 1979–1980, it proved him a scholar of varied talents. His collection Of Force and Violence and Other Imponderables: Essays on War, Politics, and Government was published in 1992, the year of his death.

- Decisive Warfare: A Study in Military Theory (1969, author).
- The Future at War I: Thor's Hammer (1979, editor).
- The Future at War II: The Spear of Mars (1980, editor).
- The Future at War III: Orion's Sword (1980, editor).
- Of Force and Violence and Other Imponderables: Essays on War, Politics, and Government (1992, editor).

=== Other fiction works ===
- Maybe Just A Little One (short story, 1947).
- A Killing in Swords (1978).
- The Doorstep (1957, and earlier).
- The Man On Top.
- Cat.
- Genius of the Species.
- The Past and Its Dead People (1956).
- Old Uncle Tom Cobleigh and All.
- The Proud Foot of the Conqueror.
- Unknown Things.
- The Timeless Tales of Reginald Bretnor (posthumous collection, 15 short stories).

=== Ferdinand Feghoot series ===
Under the pseudonym Grendel Briarton (an anagram of Reginald Bretnor), he published a series of over eighty science-fiction themed shaggy-dog vignettes featuring the time-traveling hero Ferdinand Feghoot. Known as "Feghoots", the stories involved Feghoot resolving a situation encountered while traveling through time and space (à la Doctor Who) with a bad pun. In one example, he explained his inability to pay his dues for a Sherlock Holmes fan society by turning out his empty pockets and declaring "share lack". In his adventures, Feghoot worked for the Society for the Aesthetic Re-Arrangement of History and traveled via a device that had no name but was typographically represented as the ")(". In 1980, The Compleat Feghoot collected all of Bretnor's Feghoots published up to that time and included a selection of winners and honorable mentions from a contest run by The Magazine of Fantasy & Science Fiction. The book is, as of 2006, out of print and very rare.

== Other writings ==
Bretnor also wrote nonfiction articles for the survivalist newsletter P.S. Letter, edited by Mel Tappan.

== Personal life ==
Bretnor was married to Helen Harding, a translator and U.C. Berkeley librarian, from 1948 until her death in 1967. He subsequently married Rosalie, whom he referred to in a letter in the Southern Oregon Historical Society Archives as Rosalie McShane, although she wrote under the name Rosalie Bodrero.

Brentnor died at the age of 80, in Medford, Oregon, on July 22, 1992.

The Church of Satan website alleges that Bretnor was an early associate of Anton Szandor LaVey before his founding of the Church of Satan, and that Bretnor and other science fiction authors were members of LaVey's "Order of the Trapezoid" in the early 1950s.

== See also ==
- Mel Tappan
