= Bruce D. Clayton =

American writer

Bruce D. Clayton is a noted forest fire and biological control ecologist as well as being the author of several books of interest within the survivalist movement.

== Biography ==
Clayton received his bachelor's degree in zoology and botany from UCLA in 1972, followed by his doctorate in ecology from the University of Montana in 1978. He is a California state-certified instructor of radiological defense techniques and fallout shelter management.

His 1980 book Life After Doomsday (Dial Press, ISBN 0-8037-4752-7), a self-described "survivalist guide to nuclear war and other major disasters" was an influential book within the survivalist movement. His most recent survival book is Life After Terrorism: What You Need to Know to Survive in Today's World (Paladin Press, 2002, ISBN 1-58160-326-6) which was published in the wake of 9/11. Clayton was given the Eugene Wigner Award for his work in educating the American public about civil preparedness by the US Civil Defense Council.

Clayton has studied the Martial arts since his undergraduate days at UCLA. Starting with wrestling under Coach Briggs Hunt, he moved through Judo, Shotokan Karate, Taekwando, and finally, back again to Shotokan. He is currently a 7th degree black belt with the International San Ten Karate Association.

In 2004 he released the book Shotokan's Secret: The Hidden Truth Behind Karate's Fighting Origins (Black Belt Communications, ISBN 0-89750-144-6 ), detailing his research into the origins of Okinawan karate. An expanded edition (Black Belt Communications, ISBN 9780897501880) which includes new artwork, lithographs and photo sequences, and six new chapters of new historical research which analyzes the enemies that unarmed Okinawan bodyguards faced, was published in 2010.

== Bibliography (selected) ==
=== Nonfiction ===
- Fallout Survival
- Life After Doomsday
- Life After Terrorism: What You Need to Know to Survive in Today's World
- Shotokan's Secret: The Hidden Truth Behind Karate's Fighting Origins
- Shotokan's Secret (Expanded Edition): The Hidden Truth Behind Karate's Fighting Origins
- Survival Books 1981 (with Mary Ellen Clayton)
- Thinking About Survival
- Tough Times Survival Guide (contributor)
- Urban Alert

=== Fiction ===
- Myre (The Secular Wizardry Saga Book 1)

== See also ==
- Fallout shelter
- Cresson Kearny
- Retreat (survivalism)
- Survivalism
- Mel Tappan
