= Dean Ing =

American author and academic (1931–2020)

Dean C. Ing
- Born: June 17, 1931; Austin, Texas, U.S.
- Died: July 21, 2020 (aged 89); Ashland, Oregon, U.S.
- Education: Bachelor's, Fresno State University; Master's, San Jose State University; Doctorate, University of Oregon
- Occupations: Novelist and university professor

Dean Charles Ing (June 17, 1931 – July 21, 2020) was an American author, who usually wrote in the science fiction and techno-thriller genres. His novel The Ransom of Black Stealth One (1989) was a New York Times bestseller. He wrote more than 30 novels, and co-authored novels with his friends Jerry Pournelle, S. M. Stirling, and Leik Myrabo. Following the death of science fiction author Mack Reynolds in 1983, Ing was asked to finish several of Reynolds' uncompleted manuscripts.

Ing was a United States Air Force veteran (where he served as a USAF interceptor crew chief), a former aerospace engineer, and a university professor who held a doctorate in communications theory. He was a former member of the Citizens' Advisory Council on National Space Policy.

== Background ==
Ing was born on June 17, 1931, in Austin, Texas. He earned a bachelor's degree from Fresno State University (1956), a master's degree from San Jose State University (1970), and a Ph.D. from the University of Oregon (1974). Ing and his wife resided in Ashland, Oregon, until his death on July 21, 2020.

== Work ==
Much of Ing's fiction includes detailed, practical descriptions of techniques and methods which would be useful in an individual or group survival situation, including instructions for the manufacture of tools and other implements, the recovery of stuck vehicles, and avoidance of disease and injury.

Ing's short story "Devil You Don't Know" was both a Hugo Award nominee and Nebula Award nominee in 1979.

=== Reviews ===
Kirkus Reviews called his novel Butcher Bird "Credible and entertaining, especially for fans of the previous books, and a definite improvement over The Big Lifters (1988)."

Kirkus Reviews also gave a positive review to Ing's novel The Nemesis Mission, stating: "The enormous cast can be confusing, and the setup takes extraordinarily long—but the tone is light, the gimmickry supports the fun, and the chase, when it comes, is a ripsnorter."

Publishers Weekly had praise for his 1995 novel Spooker, stating: "Ing's earlier novels (Butcher Bird, etc.) imaginatively described the special world of experimental aircraft and weaponry. Here he enters new territory, both geographically (California's Central Valley from Bakersfield to Fresno, detailed with accurate local color) and thematically, proving that he is a master of ground-based spy novels as well as of high-in-the-sky techno-thrillers. The high-tech touches that do appear, including an intriguing ultra-light aircraft, are pure Ing, who seems to have relished creating the peculiar world of his two monstrous villains. Tinged with a sense that life is bittersweet, this is a welcome offering from an always entertaining author."

Publishers Weekly also had positive remarks for his 2000 novel Loose Cannon: "Ing takes direct aim at the reader's sense of humor—connecting more often than not—in this lighthearted thriller about a Silicon Valley engineer forced into hiding after one of his inventions attracts the interest of the wrong people. ...The thriller as farce is only one of Ing's modes—he also writes sci-fi-inflected suspense novels and more serious techno-thrillers—but it is his best. The witty repartee and situational humor of his latest amusement are strained at times, but Ing continues to mine a profitable side vein in a field crowded with the claims of more conventional thriller writers."

=== Survivalism ===
In addition to his fiction writing, Ing wrote nonfiction articles for the survivalist newsletter P.S. Letter, edited by Mel Tappan. Following in the footsteps of science-fiction novelist Pat Frank, Ing included a lengthy nonfiction appendix to his nuclear-war survival novel Pulling Through. (Pat Frank authored both the nuclear-war survival novel Alas, Babylon and the non-fiction book How to Survive the H Bomb and Why.)

Robert A. Heinlein dedicated his 1985 novel The Cat Who Walks Through Walls to Ing and eight of the other members of the Citizens' Advisory Council on National Space Policy.

In an interview for the July 29, 1996, issue of Medford Mail Tribune, Dean Ing made mention of the Centennial Olympic Park bombing in Atlanta. He said: "I predict more of the same," he said, "because we haven't learned anything and they have."

== Bibliography ==
=== Quantrill series ===
1. Systemic Shock (1981)
2. Single Combat (1983)
3. Wild Country (1985)

=== Aerospace Systems series ===
- The Ransom of Black Stealth One (1989)
- The Nemesis Mission (1991)
- Butcher Bird (1993)

=== Larry Niven's Man-Kzin Wars series (Known Space) ===
- Cathouse (1988)
- Briar Patch (1989)

=== Other ===
- Soft Targets (1979)
- Anasazi (1980)
- Pulling Through (1983)
- Blood of Eagles (1986)
- Firefight 2000 (1987)—see also Firefight Y2K below
- The Big Lifters (1988)
- Chernobyl Syndrome (1988)
- Silent Thunder (1991)
- Spooker (1995)
- Flying to Pieces (1998)
- Skins of Dead Men (1998)
- Firefight Y2K (2000)—updated version of Firefight 2000, with new intros to each story/article and some new/added content
- Loose Cannon (2000)
- The Rackham Files (2004)
- Gyp Artist (2012)
- It's Up to Charlie Hardin (released by Baen Books in October 2015)

=== Collaborations ===
==== L-5 Community series with Mack Reynolds ====
- The Lagrangists (1983)
- Chaos in Lagrangia (1984)
- Trojan Orbit (1985)

==== Other collaborations with Mack Reynolds ====
- The Other Time (1984)
- Home Sweet Home: 2010 A.D. (1984)
- Eternity (1984)
- Deathwish World (1986)

==== Nonfiction collaborations ====
- Mutual Assured Survival (1984) with Jerry Pournelle—non-fiction
- The Future of Flight (1985) with Leik Myrabo—non-fiction
