= Mantrap (access control) =

Physical security access control system

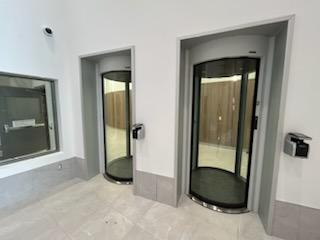
Security portals with BR3 rated glass and steel construction for ballistics and burglary protection in a data center environment

A mantrap, portal, circle lock door, tubestile, or access control vestibule is a physical security access control system comprising a small space with two sets of interlocking doors, such that the first set of doors must close before the second set opens. Airlocks have a very similar design, allowing free ingress and egress while also restricting airflow.

In a manual mantrap, a guard locks and unlocks each door in sequence. An intercom and/or video camera are often used to allow the guard to control the trap from a remote location.

In an automatic mantrap, identification may be required for each door, sometimes even different measures for each door. For example, a key may open the first door, but a personal identification number entered on a number pad opens the second.

Other methods of opening doors include proximity cards, or biometric devices such as fingerprint readers or iris recognition scanners. "Time of Flight" sensors are used in environments that require high security, enabling detection of persons with significantly different walking speeds than the individual who is authorized to walk through the passageway. Newer stereovision detection systems are often employed, providing more accurate detection of walking rate via multiple viewing angles.

Some security portal mantraps use dual authentication (per portal), employing two separate readers (security card plus biometrics, for example). This is very typical in the data center security entrance control environment.

Security mantrap portals typically offer options for all-steel construction and either Bullet/Ballistics-Resistant (BR) or RC (burglar protection) construction, including thick laminated curved glass.

Metal detectors are often built in to prevent the entrance of people carrying weapons such as guns and knives, and can protect against other tools for intrusion and destruction such as crowbars and strong electromagnets. Use of metal detectors is particularly frequent in banks, jewelry shops, and some public schools in the USA, despite having fine-tuning related issues that can sometimes cause dangerous False Positives and False Negatives.

Turnkey systems are sometimes provided by some suppliers due to the need for specially trained installers.

Fire Safety regulations require that automatic mantraps allow exit from the intermediate (i.e., trapping) space; the regulations still allow the denial of access to a secure space such as a data center or research laboratory. A manually operated mantrap may allow a guard to lock both doors, trapping a suspect between the doors for questioning or detainment.

== See also ==
- Mantrap (snare)
- Sally port
- Optical turnstile
