= Rants and Incendiary Tracts =

1989 anthology volume

- Cover of the first edition
- Editor: Bob Black; Adam Parfrey
- Language: English
- Subject: Rants
- Publisher: Amok Press/Loompanics Unlimited
- Publication date: 1989
- Publication place: United States
- Media type: Print
- Pages: 219
- ISBN: 0-941693-03-1
- OCLC: 20003676

Rants and Incendiary Tracts: Voices of Desperate Illumination 1558–Present is an anthology book of rants edited by Bob Black and Adam Parfrey. The book does not attempt to define what a rant is. Black was an anarchist, the author of The Abolition of Work, while Parfrey was a publisher. It was co-published by Parfrey's Amok Press and Loompanics Unlimited in 1989. The original co-editor was Hakim Bey, another anarchist, who left the project.

Following a prelude and a foreword from Parfrey and Black, respectively, the book is a collection of 56 rants from a variety of sources, arranged in chronological order from 1558 to 1988. The rants are either full texts or excerpts. Writers of the rants range from left-wing and anarchist activists to far-right writers, dictators, attempted murderers and murderers. The book received praise from reviewers, particularly for the perceived entertainment value and the diversity of ideologies. Several noted some content as offensive or immoral.

== Background and publication history ==
The book was edited by the anarchist Bob Black and the counterculture publisher Adam Parfrey. Parfrey was then the co-founder of Amok Press, a publisher known for its publication of strange and taboo books. Parfrey was the editor of a similar volume, Apocalypse Culture, published by Amok in 1987, while Black had previously authored the 1985 book The Abolition of Work.

In compiling the book Parfrey asked for quotes from the neo-Nazis Joseph Tommasi and George Lincoln Rockwell from James Mason for their inclusion in the book. For unclear reasons these quotes were ultimately not included. The original co-editor was Hakim Bey, another anarchist. He quit the project, disliking what he called Parfrey's "strangely reactionary mind-set" and accusing Parfrey's circle of a cultic interest in Charles Manson, murder, and Nazism. His denunciation is included as a rant in the book.

Prior to its publication, Amok Press as a publisher was having troubles, with an uncertain future. Rants and Incendiary Tracts was co-published by Amok Press and Loompanics Unlimited in 1989, in New York. Its first edition was 219 pages long; the cover features an unidentified man screaming. It was the final Amok Press book before the publisher split. By 1994, Black had denounced his co-editor Parfrey as "a pissant hustler, a liar, and a thief".

== Contents ==
Rants is an anthology book of "rants", with chapters sourced from numerous sources by different authors. At no point does the book attempt to explain what a rant is. Parfrey gives a prelude on the importance of rants, arguing that "to hold an opinion and dare to express it is the final prerogative of the free man", and that in contemporary times no one spoke their mind. Following this is a foreword from Black that expands on the meaning and consequences of these "rants"; Black defines ranters as those who "care so much that they don't care if nobody else cares".

The book includes 56 rants in total; the rants included in the book are either full texts or excerpts of longer texts. The rants are arranged in chronological order. The first entry is an excerpt from The First Blast of the Trumpet Against the Monstruous Regiment of Women by John Knox from 1558. The final rant is Hakim Bey's rant against the book itself as "Intellectual S & M Is the Fascism of the 80s" in 1988. Each entry has an explanation giving it context.

Inclusions range from the well-known to the obscure. Most of the inclusions are men, with only three women writers; it also largely focused on the United States. The book includes writers of a variety of ideologies; rants from many left-wing and anarchist writers like Bey, Wilhelm Reich, Louis Lingg, and Emmett Grogan. It also includes the works of a few far-right writers like Kurt Saxon, Ezra Pound, and Ragnar Redbeard. Other writings and authors included are SCUM Manifesto by Valerie Solanas (who attempted to assassinate Andy Warhol), Iranian dictator Ruhollah Khomeini, the Marquis de Sade, and the murderer Carl Panzram.

Rants
Year	Title	Author	Subjects/Details
	Prelude	Adam Parfrey	Parfrey argues that rants are important as "to hold an opinion and dare to express it is the final prerogative of the free man".
	Foreword	Bob Black	Black expands on rants.
1558	from The Monstrous Regiment of Women	John Knox	Knox rails against women monarchs as contrary to the Bible.
1633	from The Pleasure-Loving Modern Woman	William Prynne	Prynne, a Puritan writer, bemoans the perceived pleasure-seeking behaviors of 1600s women, advocating that they be modest instead.
1650	from A Fiery Flying Roll	Abiezer Coppe	Coppe, a religious apocalyptic writer, founded a religious group called the Ranters, who believed in a person-centered God, which he speaks of in the text. The book was officially banned by the English parliament for blasphemy.
1716	"Pirate Rant"	Captain Bellamy	A speech made by the pirate Bellamy to the captain of a ship he had seized. He denounced the rich men's laws and says he is a "free prince" making "war on the whole world".
1790	"A Fair Dream and a Rude Awakening"	Jean-Paul Marat	Marat, a journalist of the French Revolution, advocates state terror to guard the revolution.
1795	from Philosophy in the Bedroom	Marquis de Sade	De Sade advocates what the editors describe as "unending forms of sexual perversion and murder" as a way to reinforce the revolution.
1812	"King Steam"	Anon. Luddite	A poem written by an anonymous Luddite writer describing industrialization as "the Moloch wild" that destroys man.
early 19th century	from Hurrah! ou la Revolution par les Cosaques	Couerderoy	Writing from a "Satanic Anarchist", who advocates disorder and war for the "Satanic God".
1829	"A Sentimental Bankruptcy"	Charles Fourier	Fourier, a utopian socialist, writes on bankruptcy, sarcastically writing of the virtue of a "sentimental bankruptcy", in order to criticize the free market.
1844	from The Ego and Its Own	Max Stirner	Stirner advocates against secular humanism and for an amoral kind of individualist egoism.
1849	from Murder	Karl Heinzen	Heinzen advocates terrorism against his enemies, writing that murder itself is not condemnable, but rather its motives.
1867	from No Treason	Lysander Spooner	An abolitionist writes against the Constitution of the United States, saying it has no authority as most subjects to it then-alive did not agree to it; hence, he argues the American government's authority rests on nothing.
1869	"The Revolutionary's Catechism"	Sergei Necheyev	Necheyev writes on the principles and duties of a revolutionary: one who must be dedicated towards the revolution above all else, including dogma, all other connections, and who must be tyrannical, dedicated, and merciless.
1870s	"Dynamite!"	T. Lizius	Lizius, an anarcho-socialist of the International Working People's Association, writes an ode to the explosive, dynamite, advocating its usage in attacking the rich.
1880	"Speech of the Condemned"	Louis Lingg	Speech given by Lingg, sentence to death for his involvement in the Haymarket affair, where he denounces American law, advocates usage of violence, and says he shall die happy.
1880s	"Speech to Missionaries"	Red Jacket, Seneca leader	A Seneca tribe leader speaks in opposition to Christian missionaries and the Christian religion.
1880s	"An Exchange"	Judge Roy Bean & a judged Mexican thief	An exchange between Bean, an eccentric judge known for letting murderers of non-white people go free, and an accused Mexican thief who he sentenced to hang.
1888	"Voters Strike!"	Octave Mirbeau	Mirbeau writes critically of voters, advocating instead that they go on strike.
1896	from Might Is Right	Ragnar Redbeard	Redbeard, of whom little else about his real identity is known besides the authorship of the book, writes in favor of Social Darwinism and survival of the fittest.
1908	from Degeneration	Max Nordau	Writings on the degeneration of man from a Zionist writer.
1913	"Manifesto of Lust"	Valentine de Saint-Point	Writings on the power of lust.
1917	"Anarcho-Futurist Manifesto"	A. L. and V. L. Gordin	Writings of two anarcho-futurist writers, declaring "death to world Civilization".
1920	"Iconoclasts, Forward!"	Renzo Novatore	Novatore writes on his own, personal revolution.
1920	"Literature and the Rest"	Philippe Soupault	Soupault, a Surrealist and Dadaist writer, writes a manifesto about having nothing to say.
1924	from The Anathema of Zos	Austin Osman Spare	The occultist artist Spare's writings on his disgust for conventional morality and theology.
1925	"General Security: The Liquidation of Opium"	Antonin Artaud	A writing that defends the right of a drug addict to ruin their own life through addiction.
1929	"I Wish You All Had One Neck"	Carl Panzram	Writings from a serial killer from his correspondence with his prison guard, where he declares he regrets nothing and "hate[s] the whole damned human race including myself".
1930s	from The Eternal Youth	Ralph Chubb	Chubb discusses his visions of an "eternal youth" and what he calls the "visible manifestations of God".
1937	from Bagatelles pour un Massacre	Louis-Ferdinand Céline	Céline claims the existence of an International Jewish conspiracy.
1942	from Darkness	Ezra Pound	Excerpt from Pound's radio broadcasts on the subject of race.
1945	"The Poets' Dishonor"	Benjamin Péret	A surrealist poet criticizes poetry made for any cause.
1945	from Listen, Little Man!	Wilhelm Reich	Reich criticizes the self-inflicted problems of the average person.
1953	"Formulary for a New Urbanism"	Ivan Chtcheglov	A scenario of a new urbanism and a "new vision of time and space".
1963	"Concerning New Year 1963"	Ayatollah Ruhollah Khomeini	Khomeini bemoans the problems faced by Iran, for which he blames the United States.
1960s	"Ball of the Freaks"	Anon.	A profane song about engaging in a variety of forbidden acts.
1967	"There Is a Great Deal to Be Silent About"	Emmett Grogan	Grogan writes of the "money conspiracy" he considers the present day to be.
1968	from SCUM Manifesto	Valerie Solanas	Writings on the subject of radical feminism; author later attempted to assassinate Andy Warhol.
1970	"Plea for Courage"	Mel Lyman	Lyman calls to fight against the evils of the world.
1971	"P. O. W. Statement"	Timothy Leary	A statement advocating an underground revolutionary war against the establishment, culturally and physically.
1971	"On Fear"	The Process Church	The Process Church writes on the nature of fear, which they blame for the issues faced by humanity.
1970s	"Occupy the Brain!"	Carsten Regild & Rolf Börjlind	Two Swedish writers argue for individual liberation for creativity and decry the state of modern humanity.
1971	from Never Again!	Rabbi Meir Kahane	Kahane, the founder of the Jewish Defense League, writes on attacking those who denigrate Jews.
mid 1970s	"Situationist Liberation Front"	N/A	A parody of the Situationist International.
1976	from The Invisibles	Thibaut D'Amiens	Excerpt from an apocalyptic text from an unknown author, which preaches that the world is being controlled by a secret omnipotent collective called "The Invisibles".
1977	"Misanthropia"	Anton Szandor La Vey	A writing from the founder of the Church of Satan, originally published in their magazine The Cloven Hoof, on existence.
1979	"The Anthropolitical Motivations"	Stanislav Szukalski	Szukalski writes on the connections of humanity with gorillas, alleged human-gorilla hybrids, and the nature and causes of war.
1981	"The Correct Line"	Bob Black	Black writes on the "correct line" of comedy and society.
1982	"Investment in Survival"	Kurt Saxon	Written by a former neo-Nazi and survivalist. Writings on survivalism and how Saxon imagines the end of the world.
1983	"The Roots of Modern Terror"	Gerry Reith	Reith (who died by suicide aged 25) writes of a hypothetical experience on a bus.
1983	from the Meese Commission Report on Pornography	Park Elliott Dietz, M. D.	Part of a report on the supposed dangers of pornography.
1985	"Reward of the Tender Flesh"	Ed Lawrence	Lawrence discusses the meaning of shopping at the supermarket.
1984	"The Nine Secrets of Mind Poisoning at a Distance"	Kerry Wendell Thornley	Thornley gives nine tips on "Mind Poisoning" of others, including cults and mind control programs.
1985	"L'Revolucion Pour Neant"	Pascal Uni	Writings on a "revolution for nothing".
1986	"Sammy Prole Gets Tough"	John Crawford	A text-filled cartoon satirizing job markets.
1987	"Population and AIDS"	Miss Ann Thropy (Earth First!)	A work by radical environmentalists that praises AIDS for reducing the world population.
1988	"Out of the Magic of Venom: Creation"	Kathy Acker	Acker's writing on the siege of Jerusalem by the Franks and the mass killing of Muslims.
1988	"Intellectual S & M Is the Fascism of the 80s"	Hakim Bey	A denunciation of Parfrey and his circle by the former co-editor of Rants who left the project.

== Reception ==
The book received largely positive reviews, particularly for its perceived entertainment value. Ellen Datlow and Terri Windling listed it in their 1990 book The Year's Best Fantasy and Horror: Third Annual Collection, describing it as "great stuff from the people who brought you Apocalypse Culture". The Utne Reader's Ray Mungo praised the book, saying the editors had "dug up some of the most alarming, delightful, distinguished, amusing, and offensive writings in history". Journalist Harry Allen, writing for The Village Voice, praised the book, calling it a "winner" for its collection of both content with "literary value" and "claptrap", a "collection of half baked and burnt ideas". Paul Oldfield for Melody Maker called the book alluring, coming at a time "when nobody has convictions", with much content that was offensive and absurd. The periodical Factsheet Five was more mixed, calling it "more of a freak show than anything else". They further called it "an anthology [...] of texts that would perhaps be better forgotten", at least by those with morals; they called it "some of the most amoral (not to mention spiteful) invective ever produced".

Bill Blank from Anarchy: A Journal of Desire Armed described it as "a wild graveyard party with laughs and severed heads for everyone", and praised its collection of a variety of ideologies. Factsheet Five found its overriding theme to be that of an opposition to mainstream society. Steve Beaumont for the magazine Maximum Rocknroll praised the book for having shocking and interesting contents "with something for everybody"; he called the entry by the serial killer Carl Panzram particularly horrifying, and praised the diversity of ideas included. Beaumont argued the book should have provided some guidance on what constitutes a "rant" or what about them was worth paying attention to, though said this was ultimately only a minor issue, as "Rants holds no pretentions [sic] of being an academic publication" so should "not have to answer to questions of content and worth". Oldfield argued Stanisław Szukalski's contribution was the most bizarre, saying it made the pseudoscience writer Erich von Däniken seem the scientific establishment. Small Press Review said "the selections are well chosen and all evidence the passion and urgency which are common to this form", and that the book evidenced that the rant was a distinct form. Some reviewers praised the more obscure inclusions.

Beaumont argued that "the common theme which binds the fifty seven pieces in Rants together is the fact that each and every one is written with the kind of passion that most writers just dream about" with "a new philosophy, a new ideology, and a new form of extremism". Allen wrote that its contents ranged from entertaining to "hellish goop". Blank said the book successfully showed that "acerbic writing" was "a fascinating yet neglected form of communication". However, he criticized its lack of women ranters, and found the whole thing to be "a bit cold and detached" in intention. Factsheet Five found some of its exclusions strange, though praised its introduction.
