= Ragnar Benson =

American writer

Ragnar Benson (born c. 1938) is the pen name of a prolific survivalist author who specializes in preparedness topics, particularly survival retreats, hunting, trapping, austere medicine, false identification, explosives, firearms, and improvised weapons.

== Writing career ==
Many of his 46 books were published by Loompanics Unlimited (which went out of business in 2004) and by Paladin Press (which also went out of business in 2018). Both Benson and Paladin Press are controversial, because actually formulating or constructing many of the explosives and weapons that he describes would be illegal in most jurisdictions. Some of his books have been banned ("challenged") from importation into Canada, by the Customs Canada censors at the Connaught Building.

In the aftermath of the 1995 Oklahoma City Bombing, Timothy McVeigh was found to have been in possession of Benson's Homemade C-4: A Recipe For Survival and Ragnar's Big Book of Homemade Weapons: Building and Keeping Your Arsenal Secure. Senator Dianne Feinstein proposed an amendment to the Antiterrorism and Effective Death Penalty Act that criminalizes broad categories of criminally instructional speech, and it was passed by Congress in 1999. His book Ragnar's Guide to Home and Recreational Use of High Explosives and others were reportedly pulled from distribution the same year.

Benson's work on improvised medicine has been recognized and promoted by the U.S. Special Operations Command in their official publication Journal of Special Operations Medicine: A Peer Reviewed Journal for SOF Medical Professionals.

== Secretive personal life ==
Benson has revealed very few details of his background and personal life. His real name has not been revealed publicly. He was reportedly born in Indiana and was raised on a farm where dynamite was used for utilitarian purposes. As of 1999, he lived "...on nine acres in southern Idaho with his pet skunks and his wife and 100-plus guns of varying caliber." He was the son of a German immigrants, and his family spoke German in their home until the outbreak of World War II. In his book Urban Survival he recounts some of his father's experiences growing up in Germany after World War I. Later in his childhood his parents returned to Europe and he stayed in America with his grandparents who immigrated from Russia.

Benson has travelled extensively and has had no settled career. He participated in the struggle of the Cuban revolution when Fidel Castro took power. In the narrative of his book Bull's Eye: Crossbow, Benson mentions that he at one time worked as a firearms dealer in Rhodesia. In a rare interview with Salon magazine, he mentioned that he "...learned about man traps while serving as an agricultural specialist in rural Southeast Asia". In the narrative of another book Homemade C4 - A Recipe for Survival Benson mentions that he had fired a M72 LAW rocket while at Fort Benning, Georgia, home of the US Army Infantry. In the same book, Benson continues to state that he participated in the Army's Tank Commander school, something reserved for a senior enlisted soldier (E-6, SSG). Benson has also intermittently worked as a private investigator for more than 25 years. His writing pace has slowed in recent years. In 2007, he authored the foreword to James Ballou's book Long-Term Survival in the Coming Dark Age: Preparing to Live After Society Crumbles.

On December 3, 2010, Ragnar Benson was interviewed on the Omega Man Radio Show with Shannon Ray Davis for over two hours. In the interview, he mentioned that he has travelled to more than 90 countries.

== Selected bibliography ==
Books

- Acquiring New ID: How to Easily Use the Latest Technology to Drop Out, Start Over, and Get On With Your Life. Boulder, CO: Paladin Press, 1996. ISBN 0873648943.
- Action Careers: Employment in the High-Risk Job Market. Secaucus, NJ: Citadel Press, 1988. ISBN 080651079X.
- Breath of the Dragon: Homebuilt Flamethrowers. Boulder, CO: Paladin Press, 1990. ISBN 0873645650.
- Bull's Eye: Crossbow. Boulder, CO: Paladin Press, 1985. ISBN 0873643267.
- David's Tool Kit: A Citizen's Guide to Taking Out Big Brother's Heavy Weapons. Port Townsend, WA: Loompanics Unlimited, 1996. ISBN 155950143X.
- Do-It-Yourself Medicine: How to Find and Use the Most Effective Antibiotics, Painkillers, Anesthetics and Other Miracle Drugs... Without Costly Doctors' Prescriptions or Hospitals. Boulder, CO: Paladin Press, 1997. ISBN 0873649184.
- Eating Cheap. Boulder, CO: Paladin Press, 1992. ISBN 087364252X.
- The Greatest Explosions in History: Fire, Flash and Fury. Boulder, CO: Paladin Press, 1990. ISBN 0873645553.
- Guerrilla Gunsmithing: Quick And Dirty Methods For Fixing Firearms In Desperate Times. Boulder, CO: Paladin Press, 2000. ISBN 1581601190.
- Hardcore Poaching. Boulder, CO: Paladin Press, 2007. ISBN 0873644352.
- Home-Built Claymore Mines: A Blueprint For Survival. Boulder, CO: Paladin Press, 1993. ISBN 0873647262.
- Homemade C-4: A Recipe For Survival. Boulder, CO: Paladin Press, 1990. ISBN 0873645588.
- Homemade Grenade Launchers: Constructing The Ultimate Hobby Weapon. Boulder, CO: Paladin Press, 1991. ISBN 0873646266.
- How to Survive the Coming Plagues. Vinture Publications, 2010. ISBN 0982757409.
- Live Off the Land in the City and the Country, with Devon Christensen. Boulder, CO: Paladin Press, 1981. ISBN 0873642007.
- Mantrapping. Boulder, CO: Paladin Press, 1981. ISBN 0873642155.
- The Modern Survival Retreat: A New and Vital Approach to Retreat Theory and Practice. Boulder, CO: Paladin Press, 1998. ISBN 087364980X.
- Modern Weapons Caching: A Down-To-Earth Approach To Beating The Government Gun Grab. Boulder, CO: Paladin Press, 1990. ISBN 0873645839.
- The Most Dangerous Game: Advanced Mantrapping Techniques. Boulder, CO: Paladin Press, 1996. ISBN 0873643569.
- New And Improved C-4: Better-Than-Ever Recipes For Half The Money And Double the Fun. Boulder, CO: Paladin Press, 1995. ISBN 0873648390.
- Ragnar's Action Encyclopedia of Practical Knowledge and Proven Techniques. Boulder, CO: Paladin Press, 1999. ISBN 0873648013.

A compilation of some of Benson's earlier works.

- Ragnar's Action Encyclopedia, Vol. 2. Boulder, CO: Paladin Press, 1999. ISBN 0873649265. Revised edition.
- Ragnar's Big Book of Homemade Weapons: Building and Keeping Your Arsenal Secure. Boulder, CO: Paladin Press, 1992. ISBN 0873646606.
- Ragnar's Guide to Home and Recreational Use of High Explosives. Boulder, CO: Paladin Press, 1988. ISBN 0873647378.
- Ragnar's Guide To Interviews, Investigations, And Interrogations: How To Conduct Them, How to Survive Them. Boulder, CO: Paladin Press, 2000. ISBN 158160095X.
- Ragnar's Guide to the Underground Economy. Boulder, CO: Paladin Press, 1999. ISBN 1581600119.
- Ragnar's Homemade Detonators: How to Make 'Em, How to Salvage 'Em, How to Detonate 'Em. Boulder, CO: Paladin Press, 1993. ISBN 0873647378.
- Ragnar's Survival Encyclopedia. Boulder, CO: Paladin Press, 2016. ISBN 1610048962.
- Ragnar's Tall Tales. Boulder, CO: Paladin Press, 2005. ISBN 0873642635.
- Ragnar's Ten Best Traps: And A Few Others That Are Damn Good Too. Boulder, CO: Paladin Press, 1985. ISBN 0873643283.
- Ragnar's Urban Survival: A Hard-Times Guide to Staying Alive in the City. Boulder, CO: Paladin Press, 2000. ISBN 1581600593.
- Starting a New Life in Rural America: 21 Things You Need to Know Before You Make Your Move. Boulder, CO: Paladin Press, 2006. ISBN 1581604939.
- Survival End Game: The 21st Century Solution. Boulder, CO: Paladin Press, 2013. ISBN 161004861X.
- Survival Nurse: Running an Emergency Nursing Station Under Adverse Conditions. Boulder, CO: Paladin Press, 2000. ISBN 1581600755.
- Survival Poaching. Boulder, CO: Paladin Press, 1990. ISBN 0873641833.
- The Survival Retreat: A Total Plan For Retreat Defense. Boulder, CO: Paladin Press, 1983. ISBN 0873642759.
- Survivalist's Medicine Chest. Boulder, CO: Paladin Press, 1982. ISBN 0873642562.
- Switchblade: The Ace of Blades. Boulder, CO: Paladin Press, 1989. ISBN 0873645006.

Edited and revised edition by Michael D. Janich for Paladin Press, 2004. ISBN 1581604351.

Book contributions

- Tough Times Survival Guide, Vol. 1. Boulder, CO: Paladin Press, 2009. ISBN 1581607083.
- "Foreword." In: Ballou, James. Long-Term Survival in the Coming Dark Age: Preparing to Live after Society Crumbles. Prepper Press, 2018. ISBN 978-1939473646.

Video

- Homemade C-4: A Closer Look. Boulder, CO: Paladin Press, 1991. [VHS]. ISBN 978-0873646420.

== See also ==
- Kurt Saxon
- Loompanics Unlimited
- Paladin Press
- Robert K. Brown
