= Hit Man: A Technical Manual for Independent Contractors =

1983 non-fiction book by Rex Feral

- Author: Rex Feral (pseud.)
- Language: English
- Subject: How-to
- Genre: Non-fiction
- Published: 1983 (Paladin Press)
- Publication place: United States
- Media type: Print
- Pages: 130
- ISBN: 9780873642767

Hit Man: A Technical Manual for Independent Contractors is a book written under the pseudonym Rex Feral and published by Paladin Press in 1983. Paladin Press owner Peder Lund stated, in an interview with 60 Minutes, that the book started life as a detailed crime novel written by a Florida housewife, and that the format was later changed to appeal to Paladin's reader base accustomed to the publisher's non-fiction books on military, survivalist, weapons and similar topics. The book portrays itself as a how-to manual on starting a career as a hit man, fulfilling contracts. However, after a number of lawsuits claiming that the book was used as a handbook in several murders, the publication of the book was stopped. It marked "the first time in American publishing history that a publisher has been held liable for a crime committed by a reader."

== Description ==
The book is written as if by an actual experienced assassin, as a how-to manual on contract killing; however, in 1998 the Washington Post reported that the author was really a divorced mother-of-two who simply fabricated much of the material based on mystery novels and movies. The book goes on at length about studying "the mark", learning the mark's movements and routine, and silently moving in for the profitable kill, and offers advice on weapon selection and techniques.

The book was found by police searching the home of Lucio Estrada, a man who was later convicted in the murder-for-hire of Los Gatos, California businessman Mark Achilli.

== Lawsuits ==
On March 3, 1993, a triple murder was committed in Montgomery County, Maryland, by a man who used the book as his guide. James Perry, who had been imprisoned for a violent crime, was caught, convicted, and received three death sentences. Perry had been hired by Lawrence Horn, who sought to receive the proceeds of a trust fund that resulted from his ex-wife suing a hospital over injuries to their son.

The families of Mildred Horn, her son Trevor, and his nurse Janice Saunders sued, claiming Paladin Press "aided and abetted" the murder. The suit, Rice v Paladin Enterprises, claimed that Paladin Press had a share of responsibility in the murders by virtue of their publication of a book that, by Paladin's own admission, could be used by criminals and would-be criminals in the solicitation, planning, and commission of murder for hire. In November 1997, a U.S. appeals court ruled 3–0 that Hit Man was not protected by the free speech/free press clause of the First Amendment and thus Paladin Enterprises could be held liable for a triple murder committed by one of its readers.

On May 21, 1999, Paladin Press' insurance company agreed to settle the case out-of-court, against the wishes of Paladin Press themselves, who were confident that they would prevail in court on First Amendment grounds; however, Paladin's insurance company balked at going to court again due to the expense of a potential lengthy trial in federal court, plus the costs of posting of a bond in case they lost and appealed, would have cost far in excess of the settlement. Under this settlement, Paladin's insurance policy paid several million dollars to the families of those killed by the murderer, while also agreeing to destroy the remaining 700 copies of the book in their possession and surrendering any rights they had to publish and reproduce the work. Jon Ford, Paladin's editorial director, called the settlement "economic censorship."

The book was also cited as a source of information in a similar crime committed by Robert Vaughn Jones in 1999. In 2000, Paladin Press was sued again as a result of Hit Man: this lawsuit was a result of the 1998 attempted murder of Bobby Joe Wilson by her ex-husband, Robert Leslie Goggin, who hired Robert Jones to kill her in order to get money from her life insurance policy. In court, Jones testified that Goggin had recruited him to kill Wilson, and that he then purchased Hit Man. In her lawsuit, Wilson outlined two dozen points of advice from the book that Jones followed to the letter in planning to kill her. The suit was eventually settled out of court in 2002.

== Aftermath ==
After the legal cases, Paladin no longer published the book, and allowed the remaining undestroyed circulating copies to sell out. Copies exist on the Internet (notably IRC), often accompanied by the spurious claim that the book is now in the public domain. Paladin Press claims that the rights are still held by the author. It can also be purchased used from independent sellers, and is available as an e-book. It is believed that 13,000 copies were sold, although Reason Magazine estimates there are 20,000 copies of the book in existence.

== Media ==
In 1999, a book titled Deliberate Intent: a lawyer tells the true story of murder by the book, was released by lawyer, author, and First Amendment scholar, Rod Smolla. Deliberate Intent described his involvement in the notorious "Hit Man" case, where Smolla successfully represented the families of three murder victims in the court case against Paladin Press.

On August 6, 2000, a television film by Fox and the FX Cable Network titled Deliberate Intent was aired in the U.S. based directly on the book and the case. It starred Timothy Hutton, Ron Rifkin, Clark Johnson, Penny Johnson Jerald, Cliff DeYoung, James McDaniel, and Yanna McIntosh. Peder Lund, Paladin Press' owner, was played by Kenneth Welsh. It was directed by Andy Wolk, produced by Howard Braunstein and Michael Jaffe, with music by Harald Kloser. In the drama, which clearly parallels the Horn case,

The legal team then proceeds to tie the book to the case of a Motown recording engineer (McDaniel) who gets a hitman to murder his ex-wife, their paraplegic daughter [sic] and the son's nurse. By proving that the hired killer followed 22 of the 26 steps shown in Paladin's book, they're able to bring home the point that freedom of speech laws should not protect material that is produced for the purpose of aiding and abetting murder.

In 2019, Jasmyn Morris reported a nine-episode podcast called Hit Man covering the Horn family and the unusual civil case against Paladin. Rex Feral's identity had been protected by Paladin during the litigation, but Morris identified her as a grandmother in her 70's who clearly did not want to be interviewed.

In September of 2025, Abbott Kahler publicly revealed the author in Vanity Fair as Gayle McCool, outlining her relationship with a sometimes violent boyfriend who may have been an inspiration for or may have been inspired by the Hit Man mythos. She wrote a second book for Paladin under the Feral pen name, How to rip off a drug dealer.

== See also ==
- The Anarchist Cookbook
- The Poor Man's James Bond (referred to in Hit Man)

== Bibliography ==
- Feral, Rex (1983). Hit Man: A Technical Manual for Independent Contractors. Paladin Press. ISBN 0873642767.
