= Bob Black (anarchist) =

American anarchist (born 1951)

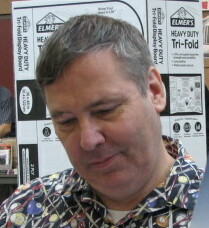
- Black in 2011
- Born: January 4, 1951 (age 75)
- Occupation: Author
- Notable work: "The Abolition of Work" (1985); Rants and Incendiary Tracts (1989)

Robert Charles Black Jr. (born January 4, 1951) is an American anarchist best known for his 1985 essay "The Abolition of Work". He was a major figure in the development of "post-left" anarchism, despite a controversial history of police informing.

== Early life and education ==
Robert Charles Black Jr. was born on January 4, 1951 in Detroit, Michigan and attended the Oak Park High School until 1969. He graduated with a Bachelor of Arts from the University of Michigan in 1973, a Juris Doctor from Georgetown University Law Center in 1977, a Master of Arts (MA) in Jurisprudence and Social Policy from the University of California, Berkeley in 1984, an MA in Criminal Justice from the University at Albany, SUNY in 1992, and a Master of Laws in Criminal Law from the University at Buffalo in 2005.

== Writings ==
=== "The Abolition of Work" (1985) ===
Black is best known for his 1985 essay "The Abolition of Work" which demands the abolition of work on the argument that it inherently causes suffering. In this widely read and influential essay, Black defines work as "forced labor, that is, compulsory production" and presents an alternative social system where such work is instead turned into "play" that would generate "production of use-values" through "delightful play-activity". In this book Black also advocates left-wing accelerationism.

=== Rants and Incendiary Tracts (1989) ===
Alongside Adam Parfrey, Black edited the anthology volume Rants and Incendiary Tracts in 1989, published by Amok Press and Loompanics Unlimited. Rants is an anthology book of "rants", with chapters sourced from numerous sources by different authors. The book includes writers of a variety of ideologies, including from many left-wing and anarchist writers as well as far-right writers. By 1994, Black had denounced his co-editor Parfrey as "a pissant hustler, a liar, and a thief".

=== Anarchy after Leftism (1997) ===
Black is believed to have coined the term "post-left anarchism" (or post-leftism) in his book Anarchy after Leftism, which focuses primarily on critiquing the ideas of Murray Bookchin. In opposition to what Bookchin presents as "social anarchism", Black accuses him of using Marxist arguments and attempting a hierarchical system incompatible with anarchist principles. Instead, Black advocates a post-leftist form of anarchism which rejects left-wing politics broadly and even ideology itself. The book is often considered a seminal work of post-leftism and Black a key defender of post-leftist anarchism.

== Bibliography ==
- Black, Bob (1986). The Abolition of Work and Other Essays. Foreword by Ed Lawrence; Introduction by Ivan Stang. Port Townsend, WA: Loompanics Unlimited. ISBN 978-0-915179-41-1.
- ——; Parfrey, Adam, eds. (1989). Rants and Incendiary Tracts. New York, NY: Amok Press/Loompanics Unlimited. ISBN 978-0-941693-03-5.
- —— (1994). Beneath the Underground. Foreword by Kirby Olson. Portland, OR: Feral House. ISBN 978-0-922915-21-7.
- —— (1997). Anarchy after Leftism. Albany, NY: Columbia Alternative Library Press. ISBN 978-1-890532-00-0.
- —— (2012). Defacing the Currency: Selected Writings 1992-2012. Berkeley, CA: LBC Books. ISBN 978-1-62049-013-6.
