= Malaika Griffin =

American murderer (born 1971)

- Colorado Department of Corrections mugshot
- Born: Malaika Tamu Griffin; May 11, 1971 (age 55)
- Other name: Leak Griffin
- Occupations: lab assistant and at a fast-food restaurant and at a thrift store.
- Parent: Alice Griffin (mother)
- Status: Imprisoned at Denver Women’s Correctional Facility
- Convictions: First-degree murder, Aggravated robbery, Aggravated motor vehicle theft
- Penalty: Life in prison

Malaika Tamu Griffin (born May 11, 1971) is an American woman serving a life sentence at the DWCF in Denver, Colorado, for shooting her white neighbor Jason Patrick Horsley to death in May 1999. After the shooting, Griffin became a fugitive from justice for six years, but after she was profiled on Fox's America's Most Wanted, Griffin was captured in El Cajon, California, a suburb of San Diego, in June 2005.

== Background ==
Malaika Tamu Griffin was born in Mississippi on May 11, 1971. In 1999, she moved to Denver, Colorado, where she was working in a pharmacy and was renting a room in a house next door to a white couple: Jason Patrick Horsley and his girlfriend Deborah Loiselle. Horsley was a carpenter, and Griffin became angry when he laid his tools on the sidewalk in front of her house after work. A bitter argument ensued on May 18, 1999.

== Crime ==
After this argument, Griffin returned to her apartment and came out with a 9mm handgun with a laser sight and shot Horsley point blank in the back, killing him instantly. Immediately after the incident, she fled to the nearby home of an acquaintance, Monique Thomas. Griffin stole Thomas' car at gunpoint and then drove away. The car was later found abandoned in Iowa City, Iowa.

Inside Griffin's apartment, police found a 9 mm carbine, ammunition, hand grenades and several how-to books on terrorism and bombmaking, including The Anarchist Cookbook and The Poor Man's James Bond. The Poor Man's James Bond was written by survivalist and former American Nazi Party member Kurt Saxon. In addition, Griffin's diary was also discovered, in which she expressed her deep hatred of white people.

== Fugitive years and capture ==
Griffin was last seen boarding a bus to Chicago, Illinois. After that, there were no sightings of her for years. Griffin was profiled on the Fox television program America's Most Wanted eight times between February 5, 2000 and June 4, 2005. After the latest broadcast, authorities received a tip from Griffin's co-workers. Griffin had also previously been profiled in an August 2001 episode of Unsolved Mysteries.

The FBI and the El Cajon Police Department contacted the suspect, who had been going by the name "Leak Griffin." After the FBI confronted her, Griffin admitted her identity. She had been working at a biotech firm as a lab assistant, at a fast-food restaurant and thrift store. Griffin was charged with first-degree murder, aggravated robbery, and aggravated motor vehicle theft. She waived her extradition and was returned to Colorado to stand trial.

== Trial ==
Griffin's trial began on February 27, 2006. During the trial, the jury read excerpts from her diary which describe her racism. One of her entries reads: "I am so sick of looking at white people!! I am so goddamn tired of them!! I wish I could kill those no good faggot, pedophilic, rapists, thieves & make it painful, (very)." Prosecutors also entered into evidence the weapons found in Griffin's apartment after she fled. Griffin decided to testify in her own defense at the trial. She claimed to have acted in perceived self-defense after Horsley threatened her and then reached into his truck for a weapon, and said her diary was about a play that she was writing. After a one-week-long trial and seven hours of jury deliberations, Griffin was convicted on all counts. Under Colorado law, a first-degree murder conviction results in an automatic sentence of life in prison without parole.

== Aftermath ==
Griffin's case was profiled on the Oxygen Network program Snapped on February 3, 2008 and it was also profiled on Investigation Discovery's Deadly Women on October 12, 2012. On September 8, 2019, the case was also featured on HLN's Vengeance: Killer Neighbors.

Griffin filed an appeal to the Colorado Court of Appeals in April 2009. She argued that her convictions should be overturned because her trial attorney was not licensed to practice law in Colorado, her notebook entries should not have been admitted as evidence, self-defense instructions to the jury were not given properly, and the prosecutor had used an impermissible argument in his closing statement. All of her claims were denied, and her convictions were all affirmed on April 16, 2009.
