= Paladin Press =

American book publisher (1970–2018)

- Status: Defunct (2018)
- Founded: 1970
- Founders: Peder Lund; Robert K. Brown
- Defunct: January 2018
- Country of origin: United States
- Distribution: United States
- Official website: paladin-press.com

Paladin Press was a book publishing firm founded in 1970 by Peder Lund and Robert K. Brown. The company published non-fiction books and videos covering a wide range of specialty topics, including personal and financial freedom, survivalism and preparedness, firearms and shooting, various martial arts and self-defense, military and police tactics, investigation techniques, spying, lockpicking, sabotage, revenge, knives and knife fighting, explosives, and other "action topics" (though the availability of books on topics like improvised explosives has been severely curtailed in recent years). Often associated with right-wing and libertarian ideologies, the press emphasized individual empowerment and distrust of authority. Sometimes described as the "most dangerous publisher in the world", it was sued over several murders connected to one of its books, and ceased operations in January 2018.

== History ==
The company's first iteration was when Peder Lund began operations in association with co-founder Robert K. Brown, in 1970 as "Panther Publications". Their first book, 150 Questions for a Guerrilla, was by General Alberto Bayo, a Communist veteran of the Spanish Civil War who became Fidel Castro's mentor when Castro was training men in Mexico for his successful revolution in Cuba. The theories advocated in his book were state-of-the-art for the time. Paladin's edition became required reading for serious students of guerrilla warfare and is still in print today. This early work set the tone for Paladin's future: it would be first to print books about controversial or suppressed subjects, and it would also be criticized for publishing works that some people found objectionable.

From 1970 to 1974, the company developed its stock of titles primarily by reprinting government military manuals previously available to the public only through purchase of purloined copies. In 1974, Lund and Brown split over the direction the company should take. Lund wanted to expand Panther's coverage of topics, while Brown wanted to start a magazine. Lund bought out Brown, who founded Soldier of Fortune magazine (SOF) in 1975.

The newly named Paladin Press then went on to publish work from a variety of well-known and notable figures in the firearms, martial arts, self-defense, privacy, personal freedom and survival fields, among them John Plaster, Kelly McCann, Jim Arvanitis, Jeff Cooper, Col. Rex Applegate, William E. Fairbairn, Barry Reid, Adam Starchild, Detective John L. Russell and Ragnar Benson. They also published Ashida Kim, whose dispute with the company (over royalty payments) is loudly proclaimed on Kim's website.

In 1983, Paladin Press published a controversial book, Hit Man: A Technical Manual for Independent Contractors, under the author's pseudonym "Rex Feral". However, Paladin Press was sued by the families of victims whose murderer they alleged to have used this book as a guideline in three 1993 murders. In 2000, Paladin was sued again as a result of Hit Man. After the cases, Paladin stopped publication, and allowed the remaining copies to sell out. Digital copies of the book are still for sale online.

In the spring of 2006, Paladin announced that it had acquired the rights to reprint 40 books previously published by Loompanics Unlimited, including the works of Claire Wolfe and other popular anti-authoritarian writers. A new in-house printing press enabled Paladin to reprint classic combat books in the public domain as well as bring back into print select titles it had dropped over the years. The company has reprinted hard-to-find books on World War II hand-to-hand combat, firearms, combat shooting, counterinsurgency, martial arts, survival skills, boxing, wrestling, and self-defense.

On June 3, 2017, Peder Lund died suddenly while on vacation in Finland, and it was decided to close Paladin Press, with no new orders being accepted, and existing orders being honored until January 31, 2018.

== See also ==
- Lawrence Horn

== Selected publications ==
- Hayduke, George (1981). Getting Even 2: More Dirty Tricks From the Master of Revenge.
- Hayduke, George (1989). The Hayduke Silencer Book.
- Merkle, Robert (1998). Ultimate Internet Terrorist: How Hackers, Geeks, and Phreaks Can Ruin Your Trip on the Information Superhighway... And What You Can Do To Protect Yourself.
- Strauss, Erwin S. (1999). How to Start Your Own Country: How You Can Profit from the Coming Decline of the Nation State. 2nd ed.
