= Kurt Saxon =

American survivalist (1932–2021)

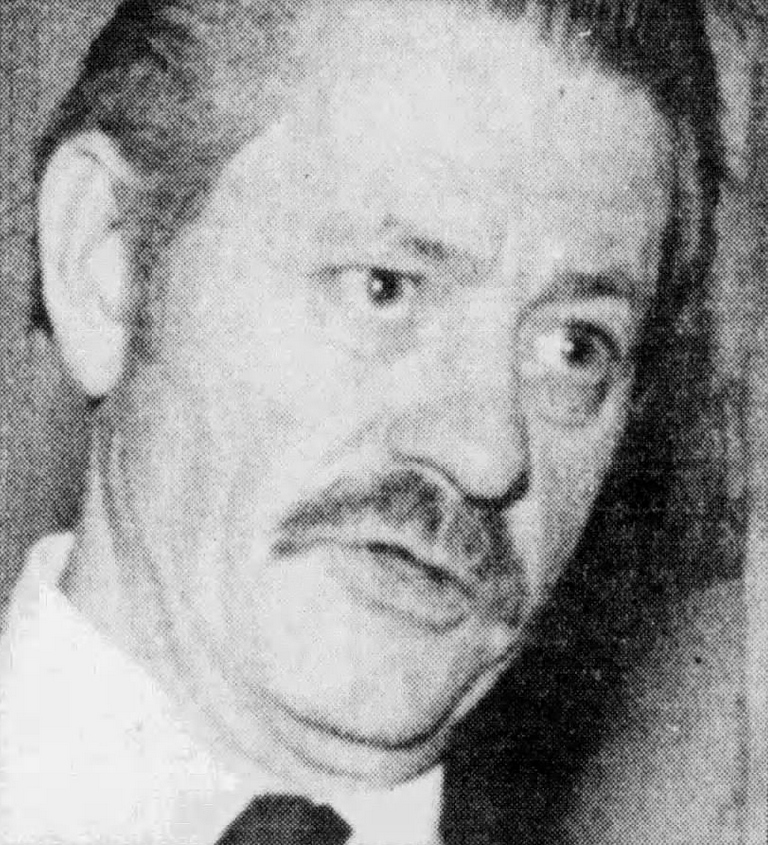
- Saxon, pictured 1982
- Born: Donald Eugene Sisco; March 6, 1932; Wichita, Kansas, U.S.
- Died: August 16, 2021 (aged 89)
- Occupation: Author
- Notable work: The Poor Man's James Bond

Kurt Saxon (born Donald Eugene Sisco; March 6, 1932 – August 16, 2021) was an American writer, radio host, survivalist and the author of The Poor Man's James Bond, a series of books on improvised weapons and munitions. He claimed to have coined the term "survivalist".

== Early life ==
He was born Donald Eugene Sisco on March 6, 1932, in Wichita, Kansas. Aiming to work in news, he was a journalist for the Taos News paper in New Mexico. He afterwards moved to Australia, which he discovered he hated, and became a sub-editor for an Australian women's magazine. He returned to the United States and finally became a copyeditor for the Los Angeles Herald-Examiner. When he returned to America, he worked odd jobs. For a time he was poor and survived off of welfare.

== Politics ==
Saxon claimed that during the 1960s he was a member of the American Nazi Party, the John Birch Society, and the Minutemen. He claimed he left the John Birch Society because they only cared about money, left the Minutemen because "all they did was run around in the desert", and left the Nazis because "all we did was drink too much".

He lost part of his left hand after improperly handling a homemade bomb in 1969.

In August 1970, he appeared before a Senate Investigations subcommittee holding hearings on bombings and terrorism. According to newspaper accounts, he suggested police and "concerned citizens" use bombs to wipe out "leftists," and recommended that student demonstrators be machine-gunned in the streets. He claimed he changed his name to Kurt Saxon facing the senate hearing in 1970. The name change was printed in a California newspaper in 1977. He said this was to avoid embarrassing his relatives. In 1980 he moved out of Eureka, California to Harrison, Arkansas. At his home in Harrison, he made an active effort to confuse his neighbors, erecting signs reading "Saxon's Lair" and "Trespassers Welcome" with a skull and crossbones.

Saxon claimed to have coined the term "survivalist" to refer to those making preparations for a future collapse of society or a major disaster. The claim is disputed.

He got married in the 1980s. He said he had "dabbled" in the Church of Scientology, Buddhism, and the Church of Satan. He at one point joined the Church of Satan, made an amulet for Zeena LaVey's baptism, and dedicated a book to her son.

In 1984, he said he had since realized far-right groups were "all garbage", and criticized the far-right. He was concerned over their claimed ties to survivalism, particularly with The Covenant, the Sword, and the Arm of the Lord, calling them "phonies". He described himself as anti-communist but was close friends with some communists. Saxon also advocated for all those with IQs measured less than 110 to be sterilized regardless of race, and said the "whole system is being swamped by aliens and people who should not have been born in the first place"; he said even forcible sterilization would not change this, and said the world was "too far gone". In 1982, he believed an apocalypse was imminent. He also believed in reincarnation and claimed that he was the reincarnation of a Roman legionnaire, Thomas Paine, a Union cavalry officer, a stormtrooper killed in World War II, and a space alien.

In the early 1990s, Saxon had a shortwave radio program over WRNO, New Orleans, Louisiana.

Saxon died August 16, 2021. He was buried in McDaniel Cemetery in Lowell, Arkansas.

== Books and periodicals ==
In the mid-1960s he began writing and publishing works on survivalist topics. Saxon is the author, under his birth name "Don Sisco," of The Militant's Formulary. After his legal name change to Kurt Saxon, he authored the biker book Wheels of Rage, a partially fictitious, but mostly factual account of the San Fernando, California based Iron Cross M.C., an Outlaw motorcycle club; the Poor Man's James Bond series of books on improvised weaponry; and Granddad's Wonderful Book of Chemistry as well as Granddad's Wonderful Book of Electricity, which are compilations of several out of print hobbyist booklets on home brew chemistry and electronics projects. Some of his works instructed on how to make Ricin, as well as weapons and other poisons. His writing was included in the collection Rants and Incendiary Tracts, one of only a few right wingers in the work.

In 1976, he began publishing The Survivor to celebrate forgotten pioneer skills. As his own publisher, Saxon advertised his work in such publications as the Berkeley Barb. In the year of 1982, he made a US$75,000 (equivalent to $250,216 in 2025) profit off his works.

=== Reception ===
From his earliest works, Saxon's writing has been cited and recommended in more mainstream publications. How to Cut Your Food Bill by Half or More was acknowledged in both survivalist and money management fields. His 1976 book Medicines Like Granddad Used to Make was included in a U.S. Department of Health bibliography of medical history.

== Selected works ==
=== Books ===
- The Militant's Formulary. Atlan Formularies, 1971.

Published under Saxon's birth name, Don Sisco.

- The Poor Man's James Bond: The Complete "Militant's Formulary" and Much, Much More. Atlan Formularies, 1972.
- How to Cut Your Food Bill by Half or More (City Survival During the Famine to Come). Atlan Formularies, 1973. [2nd ed.]
- The Instant Who's Who in the Bible. Atlan Formularies, 1974.
- Keeping Score on Modern Prophets. Alpena, AR: Atlan Formularies, 1974.
- The Poor Man's James Bond. Atlan Formularies, 1973. 4th ed.
- Wheels of Rage: The Story of the Iron Cross Motorcycle Club. Atlan Formularies, 1974.
- Fireworks & Explosives Like Granddad Used to Make. Atlan Formularies, 1975.
- Granddad's Wonderful Book of Chemistry. Eureka, CA: Atlan Formularies, 1975.
- Bar Drinks and Booze Like Granddad Used to Make. Atlan Formularies, 1976.
- Liquors and Soda Fountain Drinks Like Granddad Used To Make . Atlan Formularies, 1976.
- Medicines Like Granddad Used to Make. Atlan Formularies, 1976.

Reprint of the Medical department section of Dr. Chase's Recipes; or, Information for Everybody, by A. W. Chase, and of selections from Dick’s Encyclopaedia of Practical Receipts and Processes, by W. B. Dick. Published in 1872 by Dick & Fitzgerald in New York, now with a new foreword by Kurt Saxon.

- Old Time Home Food Processing For Fun and Profit. Eureka, CA: Atlan Formularies, 1977.
- Survival Foods, Plus. Eureka, CA: Atlan Formularies, 1977.
- Classic Ghosts and Vampires. 1978.

"Dedicated to Stanton Zaharoff La Vey."

- Root-Rot: Kurt Saxon's Answer to Alex Haley. Alpena, AR: Atlan Formularies, 1978.

Critique of Alex Haley's book and TV series Roots

- Street Fighting: America's Martial Art. El Dorado, AK: Desert Publications, 1979. ISBN 0879474289.

Published under the pseudonym "George Carpenter".

- Granddad’s Wonderful Book of Electricity. Atlan Formularies, 1980.
- The New Improved Poor Man's James Bond. Atlan Formularies, 1988. [Revised ed.]
- The Poor Man's James Bond, Vol. 1. El Dorado, AR: Desert Publications, 1991. [Revised ed.]
- The Poor Man's James Bond, Vol.2. Desert Publications, 1992
- The Poor Man's James Bond, Vol.3. Desert Publications, 1993
- The Poor Man's James Bond, Vol.4. Desert Publications, 1991
- The Poor Man's James Bond, Vol.5. Desert Publications, 1993
- Granddad's Wonderful Book of Magic. Alpena, AR: Atlan Formularies, 2003. ISBN 1881801225.
- Granddad's Wonderful Book of Toys. Atlan Formularies. [Undated.]

=== Book contributions ===
- "Investing in Survival." In: Black, Bob. Rants and Incendiary Tracts: Voices of Desperate Illumination 1558–Present. Amok Press, Loompanics Unlimited, 1988.

=== Periodicals ===
- Shoestring Entrepreneur. "Kurt Saxons Journal of Home Business." Formerly The Survivor.
  - vol. 1, no. 1 (1993)
  - vol. 1, no. 2 (1994)
- The Survivor. OCLC 7379488.
  - vol. 1, no. 1–12 (1976)
  - vol. 2, no. 1–12 (1977)
  - vol. 3, no. 1–12 (1978)
  - vol. 4, no. 1–12 (1979)
  - vol. 5, no. 1–12 (1981)
  - vol. 6, no. 1–12 (1988)
  - vol. 7, no. 1–12 (1988)
  - vol. 8, no. 1–12 (1992)
  - vol. 9, no. 1–12
  - vol. 10, no. 1–12
- The Poor Man's Armorer. "The only magazine of improvised weaponry." OCLC 223799232.
  - vol. 1, no. 1–4 (1978)
  - vol. 2, no. 1–4 (1979–1981)
  - vol. 3, no. 1–4 (1983–1985)
- U.S. Militia. "The only magazine for community defense." OCLC 818900670.
  - vol. 1, no. 1 (1993)
  - vol. 1, no. 2 (1993)
  - vol. 1, no. 3 (1993)
  - vol. 1, no. 4 (1994)
- The Weaponeer. OCLC 8715340.
  - Full collection (1984)

== See also ==
- Retreat
- Survivalism
- James Wesley Rawles
- Ragnar Benson
