= Lawrence Horn =

American musician, record producer, and recording engineer (1940–2017)

Lawrence Thomas Horn
- Born: April 18, 1940
- Died: February 11, 2017 (aged 76); Maryland, United States
- Occupations: Musician, record producer, chief recording engineer
- Conviction: Murder x 3
- Penalty: 3 x life imprisonment without possibility of parole

Lawrence Thomas "L.T." Horn (April 18, 1940 – February 2017) was an American musician, record producer and chief recording engineer for Motown Records in Detroit and Los Angeles. He later served three consecutive life sentences for hiring a hit man to murder his ex-wife, Mildred Horn, their disabled son, Trevor, and nurse Janice Saunders.

The case quickly gained national interest, and went on to prompt a lawsuit with Paladin Press, the publishers of a book, Hit Man: A Technical Manual for Independent Contractors, which had been used as a how-to manual by the killer.

== Career ==
Horn gained experience working as a disc jockey on the USS Lake Champlain (CV-39)'s radio station. His wife, Millie, later said that he'd bragged about shoving a sailor off a ship's deck during his naval service and then making it look like an accident back in 1958. Horn began working with Motown Records in Detroit, during their heyday in the early 1960s as a sound engineer. He was the chief technician for artists such as The Temptations ("My Girl") and Junior Walker and the All-Stars ("Shotgun").

Horn left Motown in 1968 to join Invictus/Hot Wax Records, sister record labels started that year by former Motown songwriting/producing team Holland–Dozier–Holland. He stayed at Invictus/Hot Wax throughout the 1970s, until he left to become an independent producer. In 1983, he went back to Motown until he was laid off in 1990.

== Personal life ==
After a brief one-year marriage to Motown receptionist Juana Royster in the late 1960s, Horn moved to Los Angeles with Motown where, in 1972, he met his second wife, Mildred "Millie" Maree, during a first-class flight en route to Los Angeles. The couple married in Las Vegas in August 1973, but separated in 1979, and filed for divorce in 1981, although they continued a relationship afterwards via their daughter. In 1984, despite the ongoing divorce proceedings, Mildred learned she was pregnant with twins by Horn. The couple divorced in 1987. Laid off by Motown in a 1990 sale and restructure, the once-prosperous Horn slid into debt, particularly with $16,000 (equivalent to $35,700 in 2025) in overdue child support.

On March 3, 1993, when the murders occurred, Horn's family consisted of:

- Mildred "Millie" Horn (born November 8, 1949) – born in South Carolina in a family of 14 children; senior flight attendant with American Airlines; moved to Maryland in 1979.
- Tiffani (born 1974) – college freshman; was away at Howard University on the night of the attack.
- Tamielle – (born August 8, 1984) – twin; was staying nearby with her aunt, Millie's sister Vivian, on the night of the attack.
- Trevor – (born August 8, 1984) – twin; severely disabled and required continual nursing care. He was being cared for by an emergency substitute nurse, Janice Saunders (aged 38).

== Murder case ==
By late 1992, Horn had befriended James Perry, via his cousin, Thomas Turner, and contracted him to kill his ex-wife, disabled 8-year-old son Trevor, and the family's overnight nurse Janice Saunders in their Layhill, Silver Spring, Maryland, home. The murders were carried out after 2:00am on March 3, 1993.

Millie's sister, Vivian (who lived half a block away) and another neighbor discovered the bodies around 7:30am on March 3, 1993. Millie Horn and Saunders had both been shot in the head multiple times, and Trevor had been smothered by the killer having placed one hand over his tracheostoma and the other hand over his nose and mouth. Attempts had been made to portray the crime as a robbery gone wrong.

The motive for hiring Detroit-based Perry to commit the murders was that Horn stood to gain $1.75 million ($3.9 million in 2025) from his son's trust fund, established after the settlement of a lawsuit resulting from a medical procedure on September 16, 1986 (when he was nearly two years old) that left Trevor with brain damage and quadriplegic. The death of his ex-wife also meant that Horn would be the sole beneficiary of the fund.

Perry was sentenced to death in 1995 for the murders, and in 1996, Lawrence Horn was found guilty on three counts of first-degree murder and one count of murder conspiracy and sentenced to three consecutive life sentences without parole. The case prompted a lawsuit in 1997 against Paladin Press, the publishers of Hit Man: A Technical Manual for Independent Contractors, which James Perry had used as a guide to execute the murders. The lawsuit was settled in 1999, when the publishers agreed to stop selling the book and pay millions of dollars in compensation to the families of the victims. Later, Perry's convictions were overturned by an appeals court, and a re-trial in 2001 sentenced him to three consecutive life sentences without parole. Perry died of an undisclosed illness in prison on December 30, 2009. Horn died in prison on February 11, 2017.

== Media ==
In October 1999, Discovery Channel's The FBI Files aired a season two episode on the case, with interviews by investigators and original crime footage, called "Hired Gun". The same year, a book called Deliberate Intent: A lawyer tells the true story of murder by the book, and based on court case against Paladin Press, was released by lawyer, author, and First Amendment scholar Rod Smolla. In 2000, a television film called Deliberate Intent, directed by Andy Wolk, was made based on the book. In September 2017, the case appeared in season one of TV series called Shattered in an episode called "Sins of the Father." Horn's complicity in orchestrating the hit against his son for personal gain was also detailed by Casefile True Crime Podcast in September 2018. The A&E program American Justice covered the murders in the episode "Blueprint for A Murder", which aired in January 2000. In August 2019, Stuff Media launched a new podcast, Hitman. It focused on Lawrence Horn and his involvement in the murders of Trevor Horn, Mildred "Millie" Horn, and Janice Saunders. It also discussed how James Perry used the book Hit Man as a reference to commit and get away with murder.
