= David Bergelson =

Yiddish-language playwright and writer (1884–1952)

- דוד בערגעלסאָן
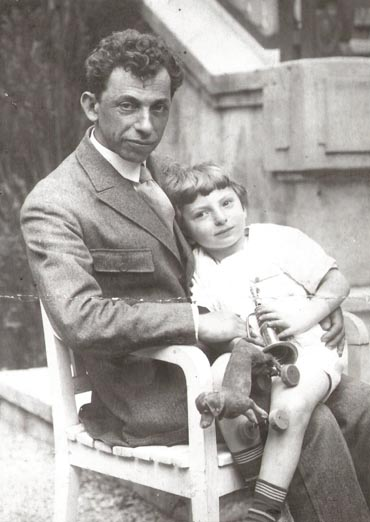
- David Bergelson with his son Lev
- Born: 12 August 1884; Okhrimovo, Kiev province, Russian Empire (now Sarny, Cherkasy Oblast, Ukraine)
- Died: 12 August 1952 (aged 68); Lubyanka prison, Moscow, Soviet Union
- Known for: Yiddish Writer

David (or Dovid) Bergelson (Yiddish: דוד בערגעלסאָן, Russian: Давид Бергельсон, 12 August 1884 – 12 August 1952) was a Yiddish language writer born in the Russian Empire. He lived for a time in Berlin, Germany, before moving to the Soviet Union following the Nazi rise to power in Germany. He was a victim of the post-war antisemitic "rootless cosmopolitan" campaign and one of those executed on the Night of the Murdered Poets.

== Youth ==
Bergelson was born on August 12, 1884, in the shtetl of Okhrimovo (also known as Okhrymovka, now Sarny, Cherkasy Oblast) in Kiev province. His early years were characterized by pogroms throughout the Pale of Settlement, catalyzed by the assassination of Czar Alexander II by a group of five young revolutionaries that included one Jew among them.

Bergelson grew up in a wealthy, religious, and Yiddish-speaking family. His father was a grain and timber merchant who spoke no Russian, maintaining his business entirely within the Jewish community. His mother came from a richer cultural background of writing and books. A maskil, a scholar in the Jewish Enlightenment movement, tutored him in Hebrew, Russian, and his parents' Yiddish. The extent of this tutoring was insufficient to allow Bergelson to enter a higher educational institution in later life.

== Adulthood and work ==
Bergelson first became known as a writer in the wake of the failed Russian Revolution of 1905. From a Hasidic background, but having received both religious and secular education, much of his writing is reminiscent of Anton Chekhov: stories of "largely secular, frustrated young people…, ineffectual intellectuals…", frustrated by the provincial shtetl life. Writing at first in Hebrew and Russian, he only met success when he turned to his native Yiddish; his first successful book was Arum Vokzal (At the Depot) a novella, published at his own expense in 1909 in Warsaw.

In 1917, he founded the avant garde Yidishe Kultur Lige (Yiddish Culture League) in Kiev. In spring 1921 he moved to Berlin, which would be his base throughout the years of the Weimar Republic, although he traveled extensively through Europe and also visited the United States in 1929-30, to cities such as Philadelphia, Chicago, and New York. According to J. Hoberman, he was "the best-known (and certainly the best-paid) Russian Yiddish writer of the 1920s". Until the mid-1920s he wrote for the New York City-based Yiddish-language newspaper The Forward.

His 1926 essay "Three Centers" expressed a belief that the Soviet Union (where Yiddish language and literature were then receiving official patronage) had eclipsed the assimilationist United States and backwards Poland as the great future locus of Yiddish literature. He began writing for the Communist Yiddish press in both New York (Morgen Freiheit) and Moscow (Emes), and moved to the Soviet Union in 1933, around the time the Nazis came to power in Germany.

He was positively impressed with the Jewish Autonomous Republic of Birobidzhan, and participated in the Jewish Anti-Fascist Committee during World War II, co-editing the literary section of the Committee's journal, Eynikayt (Unity). However, like many Soviet Jewish writers, he became a target of the antisemitic "rootless cosmopolitan" campaign. Arrested in January 1949, he was tried secretly and executed by a firing squad in the event known as the Night of the Murdered Poets on 12–13 August 1952. After Stalin's death, he was posthumously rehabilitated in 1955, and his complete works were published in the Soviet Union in 1961.

Bergelson's only child, Lev Bergelson, was an eminent Soviet biochemist who also served as a Soviet Army captain during World War II. Prof. Lev Bergelson emigrated to Israel in 1991 with his wife Naomi, where both he and his wife died in 2014.

== Works ==
The following is a partial list of Bergelson's works.

- Der Toyber (novella, 1906)
- Arum Vokzal (At the Depot, novella, 1909). "Alrededor de la estación", ed. Círculo d´Escritores, Madrid, 2014
- Nokh Alemen (novel, 1913). Title variously translated as When All Is Said and Done (1977 English-language title) or The End of Everything.
- Opgang (novella, aka Descent as listed below, 1921)
- In a Fargrebter Shtot (novella, 1914)
- Yoysef Shur (novella, 1922)
- "Three Centers" (essay, 1926)
- Shturemteg (Storm Days, short stories, 1928)
- Mides Hadin (novel, 1929). Judgment, Northwestern University Press, 2017.
- Baym Dnieper Vol. 1 (At the Dnieper, novel, 1932)
- Baym Dnieper Vol. 2 (At the Dnieper, novel, 1940)
- Birebidzshaner (novel, 1934)
- Materialn (memoir, 1934)
- The Jewish Autonomous Region (pamphlet published by the Foreign Languages Publishing House, Moscow)
- Prints Reuveni (Drama, 1945)
- Naye Dertseylungen (New Stories, war stories, 1947)
- Tsvey Veltn (novellas, 1953)

=== Translations into English ===
- When All Is Said and Done, translated, and introduced by Bernard Martin. Athens: Ohio University Press, 1977. ISBN 0-8214-0360-5.
- The Stories of David Bergelson: Yiddish Short Fiction from Russia (two short stories and the novella Departing), translated and introduced by Golda Werman, foreword by Aharon Appelfeld. Syracuse: Syracuse University Press, 1996. ISBN 0-8156-2712-2.
- Descent (aka Departing as noted above), translated and introduced by Joseph Sherman. Modern Language Association of America: New York, 1999. ISBN 0-87352-788-7.
- The Shadows of Berlin: The Berlin Stories of Dovid Bergelson (seven short stories and a satirical sketch from The Forward), translated by Joachim Neugroschel. City Lights Books: San Francisco, June 2005. ISBN 0-87286-444-8.
- The End of Everything, translated and edited by Joseph Sherman. New Haven: Yale University, 2010. ISBN 9780300110678.
- Judgment: A Novel, translated and introduced by Harriet Murav and Sasha Senderovich. Northwestern University Press: Evanston, 2017. ISBN 978-0-8101-3592-5.
