= Claire Wolfe =

American libertarian author and columnist

Claire Wolfe is an American libertarian author and columnist. Some of Wolfe's favored topics are gulching or homesteading, firearms, homeschooling, open source technology, and opposition to national ID and the surveillance state or nanny state.

== Career and insights ==
Wolfe's books include such titles as 101 Things to Do 'Til the Revolution and I Am Not a Number! Wolfe writes or has written for a number of magazines, notably Backwoods Home Magazine; S.W.A.T. magazine; and DGC Magazine, which covers electronic, metal-backed currencies. A common subject in Wolfe's writing has been the fictional town of Hardyville, a rural libertarian enclave populated by stereotypical characters (Dora-the-Yalie, Bob-the-Nerd, Carty-the-Marine, etc.). When not writing, Wolfe is also an artist specializing in pastel portraits of people and animals and makes and sells jewelry and kaleidoscopes.

"America is at that awkward stage. It's too late to work within the system, but too early to shoot the bastards."—Claire Wolfe, 101 Things to Do 'Til the Revolution (1996)

Wolfe's first book, 101 Things to Do 'Til the Revolution, was the result of disillusionment with the voting record of Republican Linda Smith of Washington, whose congressional campaign Wolfe had supported in 1994. The book advocated a radical libertarian stance, opposed both major political parties, and encouraged self-sufficiency and actions to minimize the influence of the government in the life of the individual, as well as ideas for monkeywrenching. It was published by Loompanics Unlimited and became an underground bestseller.

Wolfe wrote a column for WorldNetDaily in the late 1990s and has written and blogged irregularly since then. The Freedom Outlaw's Handbook (2004) is a compilation of ideas from Wolfe's first two books.

== Selected works ==
- The Bad Attitude Guide to Good Citizenship. Boulder, Colo.: Paladin Press (2010). ISBN 978-1581607413.
- Depression 2.0: Creative Strategies for Tough Economic Times (as contributor). Process Media (2009). ISBN 978-1934170069.
- Tough Times Survival Guide (as contributor). Boulder, Colo.: Paladin Press (2009). ISBN 978-1581607116.
- The Freedom Outlaw's Handbook: 179 Things to Do 'Til the Revolution. Boulder, Colo.: Paladin Press (2007). ISBN 1581605781.
- How to Kill the Job Culture Before it Kills You: Living a Life of Autonomy in a Wage-Slave Society (2005). ISBN 1559502479.
- I Am Not a Number!: Freeing America from the ID State. Port Townsend, Wash.: Loompanics Unlimited (2003). ISBN 1559502320.
- Rebelfire: Out of the Gray Zone (2005). Novel co-authored with Aaron Zelman. ISBN 0964230488.
- The State vs. The People: The Rise of the American Police State (2001). ISBN 096423047X.
- Think Free to Live Free: A Political Burnout's Guide to Life, Activism and Everything (2001). ISBN 1893626458.
- 101 Things to Do 'Til the Revolution: Ideas and Resources for Self-Liberation, Monkey Wrenching and Preparedness. Breakout Productions [Rev. ed.] (January 1999). ISBN 189362613X.
- Don't Shoot the Bastards (Yet): 101 More Ways to Salvage Freedom (1999). ISBN 1559501898.
- Hardyville Tales: When "Don't Tread on Me" Meets "For Your Own Good" (2010). ISBN 978-0984622207.
- RATS: Your Guide to Protecting Yourself Against Snitches, Informers, Informants, Agents Provocateurs, Narcs, Finks, and Similar Vermin (2012), with the Commentariat of the Living Freedom blog.

== Quotes ==
- "The one thing freedom lovers need is real community. Not just the community of Web yakking. Not just the community of common ideas and ideals. But a web of institutions that serve freedom's goals."—Would You Move to the State of the Free? (2001)
- "...perhaps because you’re not the customer any more. You’re simply a “resource” to be managed for profit."—Little Brother is Watching You: The Menace of Corporate America (1999)

== Film work ==
Wolfe was the writer for the 2003 Aaron Zelman film Innocents Betrayed.
