= Joachim Neugroschel =

American poet

- Born: 13 January 1938; Vienna
- Died: 23 May 2011 (aged 73); Brooklyn, New York
- Education: Columbia University
- Occupations: Literary translator, art critic, editor, publisher

Joachim Neugroschel (13 January 1938—23 May 2011) was a multilingual literary translator of French, German, Italian, Russian, and Yiddish. He was also an art critic, editor, and publisher.

== Early life and education ==
Joachim Neugroschel was born in Vienna. His father was the Yiddish Galician poet Mendel Naygreshl (Max Neugröschel) (1903–1965). The family emigrated to Rio de Janeiro in 1939, and eventually arrived in New York City in 1941. He grew up in New York City and graduated from Bronx Science (1954) and Columbia University (1958) with a degree in English and Comparative Literature. After graduating from Columbia, he lived in Paris and then in Berlin. Neugroschel returned to New York six years later and became a literary translator.

Although his father was a native Yiddish speaker, Neugroschel did not grow up speaking the language and learned it as an autodidact in the 1970s.

== Work ==
Neugroschel translated more than 200 books by numerous authors, including Sholem Aleichem, Dovid Bergelson, Chekhov, Alexandre Dumas, Hermann Hesse, Kafka, Thomas Mann, Moliere, Maupassant, Proust, Joseph Roth, Albert Schweitzer, Isaac Bashevis Singer, and modern writers such as Ernst Jünger, Elfriede Jelinek and Tahar Ben Jelloun. His Yiddish translations of The Dybbuk by S. Ansky and God of Vengeance by Sholem Asch were produced and reached wide audience.

In an interview that touched on his translation process, Neugroschel said, "I never read a book before translating it. No reason to. I do not translate the words literally. Only a bad translator would translate literally." He followed up with, "You don't have to have a sense of the author's work to translate. I read a page and get the style. It is a question of music and rhythm."

== Recognition ==
Neugroschel was the winner of three PEN Translation Awards, the 1994 French-American Translation Prize, and the Guggenheim Fellowship in German Literature (1998). In 1996 he was also made a Chevalier in the Ordre des Arts et des Lettres. Joachim Neugroschel became also known in Germany through an interview that the writer Hubert Fichte conducted with him in New York in September 1978. However, it was only published in 2006 as part of The History of Sensibility, a nineteen-volume cycle of narrations by Hubert Fichte as the third volume entitled The Second Guilt.

== Death ==
Neugroschel died in Brooklyn at the age of 73. He is survived by his legal guardian and former partner, Aaron Mack Schloff.

== Selected translations ==
- Georges Bataille, Story of the Eye (Urizen Books, 1977)
- Elias Canetti, The Tongue Set Free (Seabury Press, 1979)
- Gregor von Rezzori, Memoirs of an Anti-Semite (Viking, 1981)
- Elias Canetti, The Torch in My Ear (Farrar Straus Giroux, 1982)
- Manès Sperber, God's Water Carriers (Holmes & Meier, 1987)
- Joseph Goebbels, Michael (Amok Press, 1987)
- Elfriede Jelinek, The Piano Teacher (Weidenfeld & Nicolson, 1988)
- Ernst Jünger, Aladdin's Problem (Marsilio Publishers, 1992)
- Ernst Jünger, Eumeswil (Marsilio Publishers, 1993)
- Franz Kafka, The Metamorphosis and Other Stories (Scribner, 1993)
- Tahar Ben Jelloun, With Downcast Eyes (Little, Brown and Company, 1993)
- Joseph Roth, The Radetzky March (Overlook Press, 1995)
- Thomas Mann, Death in Venice and Other Tales (Viking, 1998)
- Hermann Hesse, Siddhartha: An Indian Tale (Penguin, 1999)
- The Dybbuk and the Yiddish Imagination: A Haunted Reader [ed. and trans.] (Syracuse University Press, 2000)
- Leopold von Sacher-Masoch, Venus in Furs (Penguin, 2000)
- Marcel Proust, The Complete Short Stories of Marcel Proust (Cooper Square Press, 2001)
- Guy de Maupassant, The Necklace and Other Tales (Modern Library, 2003)
- Alexandre Dumas, The Man in the Iron Mask (Penguin, 2003)
- No Star Too Beautiful: Yiddish Stories from 1382 to the Present [ed. and trans.] (W.W. Norton, 2002)
- Dovid Bergelson, The Shadows of Berlin: The Berlin Stories of Dovid Bergelson (City Lights Books, 2005)
- Marquis de Sade, Philosophy in the Boudoir; or, The Immoral Mentors (Penguin, 2006)
- The Golem: A New Translation of the Classic Play and Selected Short Stories [ed. and trans.] (W.W. Norton, 2006)
- E.T.A. Hoffmann, The Nutcracker and the Mouse King / Alexandre Dumas, The Tale of the Nutcracker (Penguin, 2007)
