= Michael (novel) =

1929 semi-autobiographical novel by Joseph Goebbels

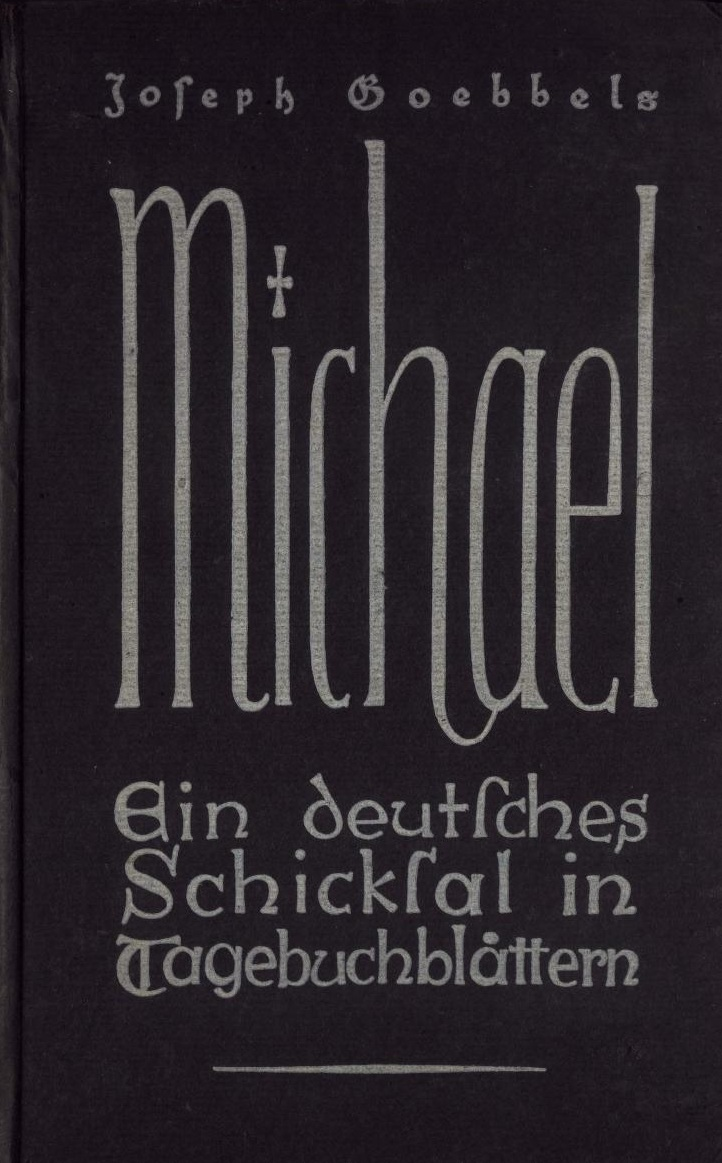
- Cover of the 17th edition
- Author: Joseph Goebbels
- Translator: Joachim Neugroschel
- Language: German
- Published: Franz Eher Nachfolger (German, 1929); Amok Press (English, 1987)
- Publication place: Germany
- Media type: Print
- Pages: 234
- ISBN: 0-941693-00-7 Amok Press edition
- OCLC: 883881378

Michael: Ein deutsches Schicksal in Tagebuchblättern (transl. Michael: A German Destiny in Diary Form) is a semi-autobiographical novel authored by the German propagandist Joseph Goebbels. It was rejected for publication but later published in 1929 by NSDAP officials against Goebbels' wishes. It is a three-part work of which only parts I and III have survived. It was translated into English in 1987 by Joachim Neugroschel, and published by Amok Press as Michael: A Novel.

== Background ==
The novel is a combination of Goebbels' own thoughts and the life of his best friend Richard Flisges who had fought in World War I, and later ended his college studies to work in a mine where he died in an accident. That is what happens to the novel's protagonist Michael who meets his "sacrificial death" on 30 January 1921.

The book was written in 1923, when Goebbels was 26, after he had finished his PhD.

== Plot ==
In a diary form the story follows the journey of Michael, a fictional character who represents a young Joseph Goebbels. At the beginning of the novel Michael has just returned home from service in the Great War. He finds a new democratic Germany which invokes feelings of both love and hate. Throughout the novel Michael wrestles with this mix of nationalist pride and anger towards Weimar Germany and he explores his personal philosophy and belief system.

== Analysis ==
In the novel Goebbels gives praise to Christianity, and describes Jesus as one of the finest men to have ever lived but claimed also that he was not a Jew. He also demonstrates his early socialist sympathies when he stated that Germans had to be "something like Christ Socialists" The book also explores the nature of God and the contemporary man: "modern man...is intrinsically a seeker of God, perhaps a Christ-man."

Goebbels retained a small amount of Christianity, but an eccentric form, which diminished even more after the failed church reform program in 1934–35.

One of Joseph Goebbels' biographers, Joachim Fest (who was also Hitler's biographer), suggests that Michael sheds light on Goebbels' state of mind and self-image: "The very name of the hero, Michael, to whom he gave many autobiographical features, suggests the way his self-identification was pointing: a figure of light, radiant, tall, unconquerable," and above all "'To be a soldier! To stand sentinel! One ought always to be a soldier,' wrote Michael-Goebbels."

== Publication history ==
It was rejected for publication but later published in 1929 by NSDAP officials against Goebbels' wishes. The original edition carried the subtitle Pages From a German Destiny. The book was rejected by several German printers. Only parts I and III have survived. Michael was a significant popular success, going through seventeen printings.

In 1987, it was republished by Amok Press. This edition was translated into English by Joachim Neugroschel, and was 131 pages long. It was published in paperback form. This publication lacked the original subtitle, and it was instead printed as simply Michael: A Novel.
