= Mel Gordon =

American professor, director, and writer (1947–2018)

- Born: Melvin Irwin Gordon; February 18, 1947; Detroit, Michigan, U.S.
- Died: March 22, 2018 (aged 71); Richmond, California, U.S.
- Education: University of Michigan; New York University
- Spouse: Sheila Gordon
- Writing career
- Notable works: Theatre of Fear and Horror; Voluptuous Panic: The Erotic World of Weimar Berlin

Melvin Irwin Gordon (February 18, 1947 – March 22, 2018) was an American professor, director and writer.

== Biography ==
Melvin Irwin Gordon was born on February 18, 1947, in Detroit, Michigan to leftist parents Rose Gordon (née Alpert) and Joseph Gordon. He graduated with a bachelor's degree from University of Michigan and completed his master's and PhD in performance studies from New York University. He taught at the New York University Tisch School of the Arts in the 1970s and 80s before being hired by UC Berkeley, where he taught a popular course on bad acting, in 1990. He also taught courses on the History of Offensive Humor and Method Acting in Hollywood Film. He died on March 22, 2018, due to complications of renal failure.

== Works ==
In 1994, Gordon staged a cabaret show at Bimbo's 365 about Anita Berber, a Weimar era actress, dancer and writer, later writing her biography. Two years later, he staged another cabaret show at the same location about Erik Jan Hanussen, a clairvoyant close to Hitler, also writing his biography later. Gordon wrote two books on the sexual histories of Berlin and Paris, a book on the history of the Grand Guignol theatre and a two-volume history of the Stanislavski method. He was finishing books about American fascist love cults and flappers at the time of his death.

== Archive ==
In 2019, the Harry Ransom Center at The University of Texas at Austin announced it had acquired the papers and personal collection of Mel Gordon. Among the papers are original documents relating to American method acting, German cabaret, and the Grand Guignol. Hundreds of rare sound recordings capture performances of vaudeville, early twentieth-century Broadway theatre, and interviews with noted actors and directors.

== Bibliography ==
- The Grand Guignol: Theater of Fear and Terror (1988): Amok Press
  - Theatre of Fear and Horror: Expanded Edition: The Grisly Spectacle of the Grand Guignol of Paris, 1897-1962. Port Townsend, WA: Feral House. 2016 [1988]. ISBN 978-1627310314.
- The Seven Addictions and Five Professions of Anita Berber: Weimar Berlin's Priestess of Depravity. London: Feral House. 2006. ISBN 9781932595123.
- Voluptuous Panic: the Erotic World of Weimar Berlin. New York: Feral House. 2006. ISBN 193259597X.
- Horizontal Collaboration: The Erotic World of Paris, 1920-1946. Port Townsend, WA: Feral House. 2015. ISBN 9781627310178.
- Cabarets of Death. Death, Dance and Dining in Early Twentieth-Century Paris, 2024, ISBN 9781907222269
