= The Abolition of Work =

1985 essay by Bob Black

External audio
- The Abolition of Work, a free mp3 recording from the Audio Anarchy project. Part of the Anti-Work Essays series.

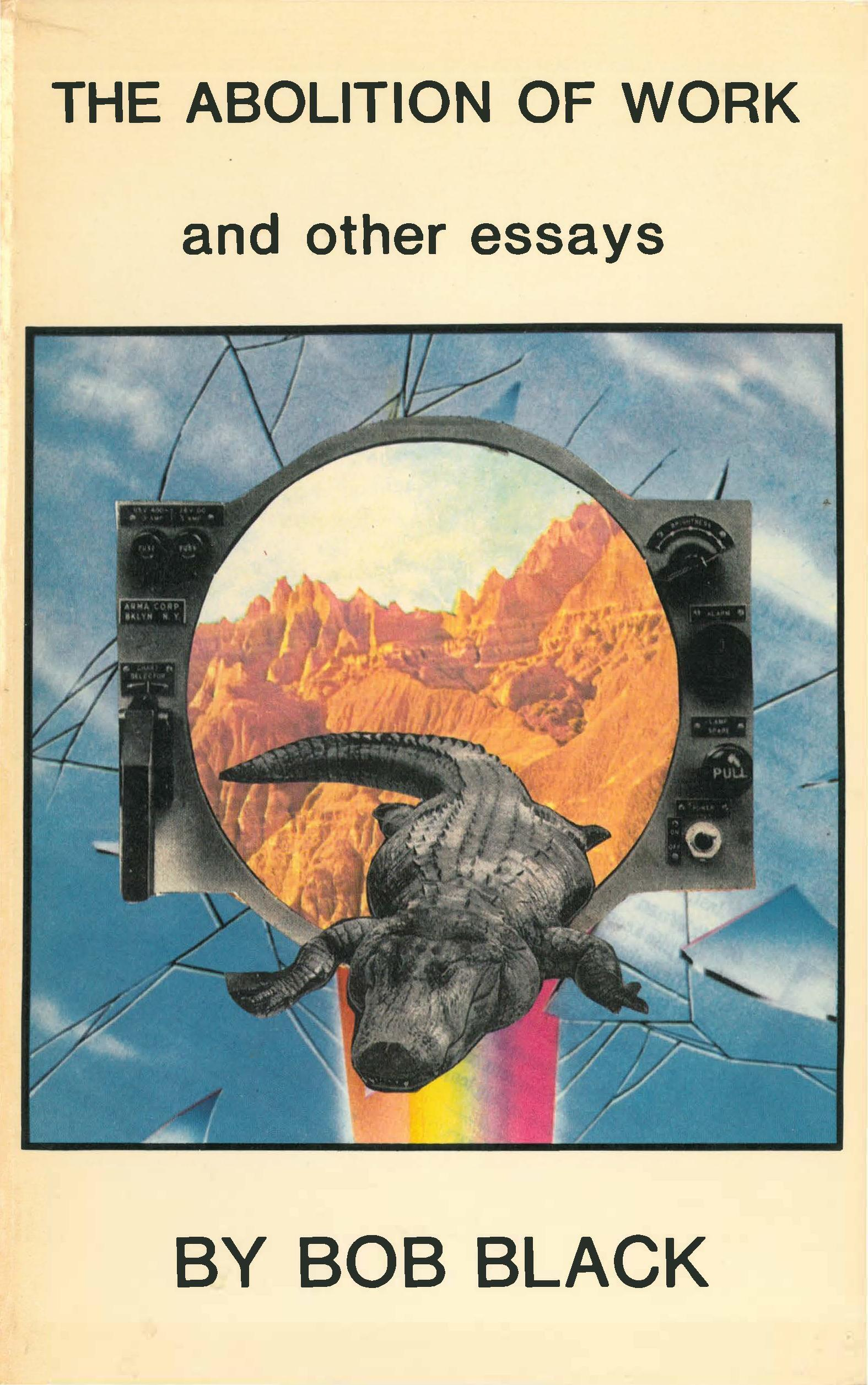
Cover of The Abolition of Work and Other Essays, the anthology in which the essay was published

"The Abolition of Work" is an essay written by Bob Black in 1985. It was part of Black's first book, an anthology of essays entitled The Abolition of Work and Other Essays published by Loompanics Unlimited. It is an exposition of Black's "type 3 anarchism" – a blend of post-Situationist theory and individualist anarchism – focusing on a critique of the work ethic.

== Synopsis ==
In the essay, Black advocates against work, and for play. He opens the essay with the sentence "No one should ever work". Black defines work as "compulsory production" enforced by "economic or political means", which he criticizes both in capitalist and communist economic systems. Black does not argue for idleness, but for "a new way of life based on play". According to him, work is the source of the misery in the world. He considers the modern American worker of his time as a "part-time slave", in a hierarchy comparable to a monastery or prison.

Black claims that work can largely be abolished, since most of it is useless except for those in power. According to him, the useful work that then remains after the abolition could be transformed into playing games, "indistinguishable from other pleasurable pastimes, except that they happen to yield useful end-products".

The essay is humoristic in tone and could be considered satirical, although Black writes that he is "both joking and serious". Reverend Ivan Stang writes in the foreword of the collection that Black wrote some of the "wittiest hate humor I'd ever seen". Black, for example, compares the modern American worker to the Cambodian genocide, writing: "People think the Cambodians were crazy for exterminating themselves, but are we any different?"

== Influence ==
"The Abolition of Work" was a significant influence on futurist and design critic Bruce Sterling, who at the time was a leading cyberpunk science fiction author and called it "one of the seminal underground documents of the 1980s". The essay's critique of work formed the basis for the anti-labor faction in Sterling's 1988 novel Islands in the Net.

The book has been cited and referred to during the anti-work movement of the 2020s, particularly active on Reddit.

== See also ==
- Anarcho-syndicalism
- Anti-work
- Automation
- Freedom of choice
- He who does not work, neither shall he eat
- Issues in anarchism
- Libertarian socialism
- Post-work society
- Refusal of work
- Universal basic income
- Wage slavery
- Work as play
- Workers of the world, unite!
