= Jim Arvanitis =

Greek-American martial artist, author and professional trainer

Jim Arvanitis is a Greek-American martial artist and professional trainer of Mixed Martial Arts/Hybrid Reality Combat based on the pankration model, and author of several books and videos relating to pankration. He is considered Pankration's Renaissance Man and the founder of Neo-Pankration, a blend of the remnants of the ancient pankration and elements found in modern sources such as Western boxing, savate, Greco-Roman wrestling, Muay-thai, and combat judo. He holds the rank of Great Grandmaster, 11th Dan from the World Pankration Dan Ranking.

Arvanitis was featured on the cover of Black Belt magazine in the November 1973 issue. This was the first exposure of pankration's history and evolution to the global martial arts community. Jim has since appeared on multiple covers and in hundreds of articles over the past forty years, and has received several awards for his efforts and contributions.

== Early career ==
Jim Arvanitis was born in the Greater Boston area, the son of a Greek-immigrant father who instilled ethnic pride in him from an early age. He attended Greek school to learn the language and became enchanted with the myths and legends of the culture. Athletics played an important role in the family. Arvanitis was a decorated high school athlete in track and basketball for which he set a city league record for points scored in a single game (68) and in a season. He also set school records for pushups and pullups.

His passion, however, was combat sports and learning to defend himself mainly due to an incident where he was bullied by three older boys. He began learning Western wrestling at age seven and boxing some years later, becoming a champion in his weight division in both while competing throughout the Northeast. Arvanitis' interest in grappling brought him in contact with many former professional wrestlers from the old NWA and World Wrestling Federation (now WWE) including the likes of Lou Thesz, Bruno Sammartino, and Walter "Killer" Kowalski. They would come into his father's restaurant for dinner whenever they were in town to perform, and Jim would eagerly discuss wrestling moves with them at length. They took a liking in him and invited him to work out with them. Although he realized that the matches were "worked" he found that many were proficient in catch wrestling which is what they focused on in their training sessions. Arvanitis later took an interest in martial arts but rather than studying the more popular Asian styles he opted for Thai boxing (muay-Thai), savate, and combat judo. He found these more to his liking and much more pragmatic than the rigid horse stances and prearranged forms of Taekwondo and kung-fu. Jim also immersed himself into extensively reading about many other fighting systems of different cultures.

Opposed to the more conventional stylized methods, Arvanitis' focus was directed more toward totality in combat. By 1969 he had assimilated his techniques and training into a cohesive system and began researching the roots of martial arts, especially of his own ethnicity. It was during this time that he learned of pankration, the "all-powers" fighting sport of his ancestors. It became his passion to rebuild the vanished legacy from the ground up by using ancient artwork and prose as a blueprint implemented with his more contemporary studies.

Upon graduating from college Jim married the former Chrystine Gardner. They would later have two sons, Brandon and Bryson. Arvanitis pursued a teaching career in mathematics but had wanted to promote his art on a full-time basis. He opened his first Spartan Academy in 1971 in the greater Boston area, and continually gave public demonstrations throughout much of New England to attract students.

Arvanitis insisted from the start that his personal development was not an exact replication of the original pankration. Of more importance to him was its conceptual foundation of total fighting freedom and functional efficiency to end a conflict quickly. He initially called his art Mu Tau but later dropped it in favor of pankration, and more precisely, neo-pankration. To further distinguish it he modified the pronunciation from the native Greek pahn-gra-tee-ahn to the more anglicized pan-cray-shun.

Owing to his Greek heritage, his effort to reinstate pankration was only partially due to ethnic pride but more to his sincere desire to forge a new path in the martial arts by combining things that worked and discarding those which did not. There were no prearranged forms, bowing, or belt ranks but an emphasis on conditioning and applying one's tools against a live opponent in hard contact sparring. Arvanitis's system was geared to reality-based street fighting but was very similar to today's MMA in that it included standup and ground tactics, along with an amalgam of strikes, joint locks, takedowns, throws, and anything else that he felt was effective.

In 1973, prominent martial arts journalist and weapons expert Massad Ayoob learned of Arvanitis and approached him for an interview. Ayoob was intrigued by Jim's knowledge of pankration and his diverse skill-set. They teamed up to do a story for Black Belt magazine and, at Ayoob's urging, Arvanitis headed to Los Angeles to demonstrate at their offices. His performance was so dynamic that he was featured on the cover of the very next issue. Upon his return from the West Coast Jim continued to work extensively on knife defenses and handgun disarms with Ayoob. This became an essential part of his "battlefield" component.

== Later work ==
It was Arvanitis' contention that the ancient Greeks were the first to have created a system of integrated fighting skills for use in competition. He also hinted that pankration might have even influenced the development of karate in the orient due to Alexander the Great's conquests into India. This enraged the martial arts community who felt that pankration was too "crude" to have any relevance. Arvanitis was content that the controversy he started made people at least think about the possibility, and not merely cling to the common belief that it was the Asians who were the sole inventors of martial arts.

Jim realized that to increase awareness of this, teaching classes was not enough. He looked to the media to help with this objective and wrote many articles, books, and videos to spread the word. In many ways the ability to express himself through the written word became as useful as his physical prowess.

Arvanitis continually modified the techniques he adopted from martial arts and combat sports so that they would work in real-world combat. Rather than practicing on padded mats all the time, he and his students would train and spar on sand to simulate the ancient skamma (sandpit) arena of the ancients, and on hard pavement.

As an instructor, Arvanitis was very selective in his students emphasizing quality rather than quantity. With this philosophy in mind and the fact that mixed fighting was not yet popular, his following was always small but constant. They consisted of a hardcore group who were looking for something more realistic in terms of a no-holds-barred street brawl. Through the years he would teach at his exclusive academies and conduct seminars in the U.S., Canada, and Europe. In 1992, Arvanitis prepared military special forces in hand-to-hand close quarter combat for Operation Desert Storm.

== Training and discipline ==
A well-known physical fitness devotee, Arvanitis has trained daily for most of his life, stretching, lifting weights, and running between six and eight miles on a daily basis. To develop his striking tools he has long utilized various equipment much of which was unseen in martial arts in the early days: small plastic and rubber balls suspended from the ceiling for accuracy; for timing, the double-end bag; and for power an assortment of customized heavy bags. With his understanding of body mechanics he was able to generate a large amount of force in his blows. Many who held focus gloves and Thai pads for him to hit claim that the impact of his punches and kicks dislocated their shoulders.

Arvanitis was always eager to test himself and was also involved in numerous real-life scrapes. Coupled with a high energy level was an intense discipline for working out either alone or with partners. Jim sparred all kinds of opponents, from boxers, kickboxers, and karate black belts to wrestlers. Some outweighed him by more than sixty pounds. In sparring he advocated protective gear in order to simulate realistic conditions without risking serious injury. One of his top followers remarked that he was challenged frequently at his school, and few lasted more than a few minutes against him in impromptu matches. Mas Ayoob once stated in another 1970s article that "Jim Arvanitis was possibly the finest total combat athlete that America had yet produced."

== World records and special feats ==
Arvanitis' athleticism is reflected in his strength and endurance. He holds world records for his signature thumb pushups setting the first in 1977 with 45 in 51 seconds, and then three years later topping that mark on the nationally televised Guinness Game World Records Show completing 61 in 47 seconds. Jim also demonstrated up to seventeen consecutive one-arm thumb pushups on television talk shows throughout the 1980s. Other accomplishments include two-finger pushups on one arm, doing thumb pushups with his arms extended in front of his head, holding a static pushup position on his thumbs for several minutes, and doing his thumb pushups with his feet elevated on a chair.

== Awards ==
Jim Arvanitis has received numerous international Hall of Fame induction awards for his accomplishments including Historical Figure, Grandmaster of the Year, and Living Legend. He was named Black Belt magazine's Instructor of the Year in 2009 and International Man of the Year by the World Head of Family Sokeship Council in 2010. In 2000, his former home state of New Hampshire voted him Athlete of the Century. He is also among the elite martial artists in the world enshrined in the Martial Arts History Museum Hall of Fame.

== Books ==
- Taking It to the Streets: Combat Essentials for Real-World Self-Defense, Kindle Direct Publishing (2019)
- Ancient Greek Martial Arts: Warfare and Combat Sports in the Classical World, Kindle Direct Publishing (2018)
- Pankration: The Original Mixed Martial Art, Kindle Direct Publishing (2018)
- Pankration Resurrection: Preserving the Way of All-Powers Combat, Kindle Direct Publishing (2017)
- Pankration: The Unchained Combat Sport of Ancient Greece/MMA Origins, Kindle Direct Publishing (2015)
- Battlefield Pankration: Lethal Personal Combat for the Street, Paladin Press (2011)
- The First Mixed Martial Art: Pankration from Myths to Modern Times, Black Belt Books (2009)
- Game of the Gods: The Historical Odyssey of Greek Martial Arts, Black Belt Books (2006)
- Pankration: The Traditional Greek Combat Sport and Modern Mixed Martial Art, Paladin Press (2003)
- Mu Tau Pankration: Concepts and Skills of All-Powers Combat, Spartan Productions (1997)
- Mu Tau: The Modern Greek Karate, Todd & Honeywell (1979)
