= John Strausbaugh =

American author (born 1951)

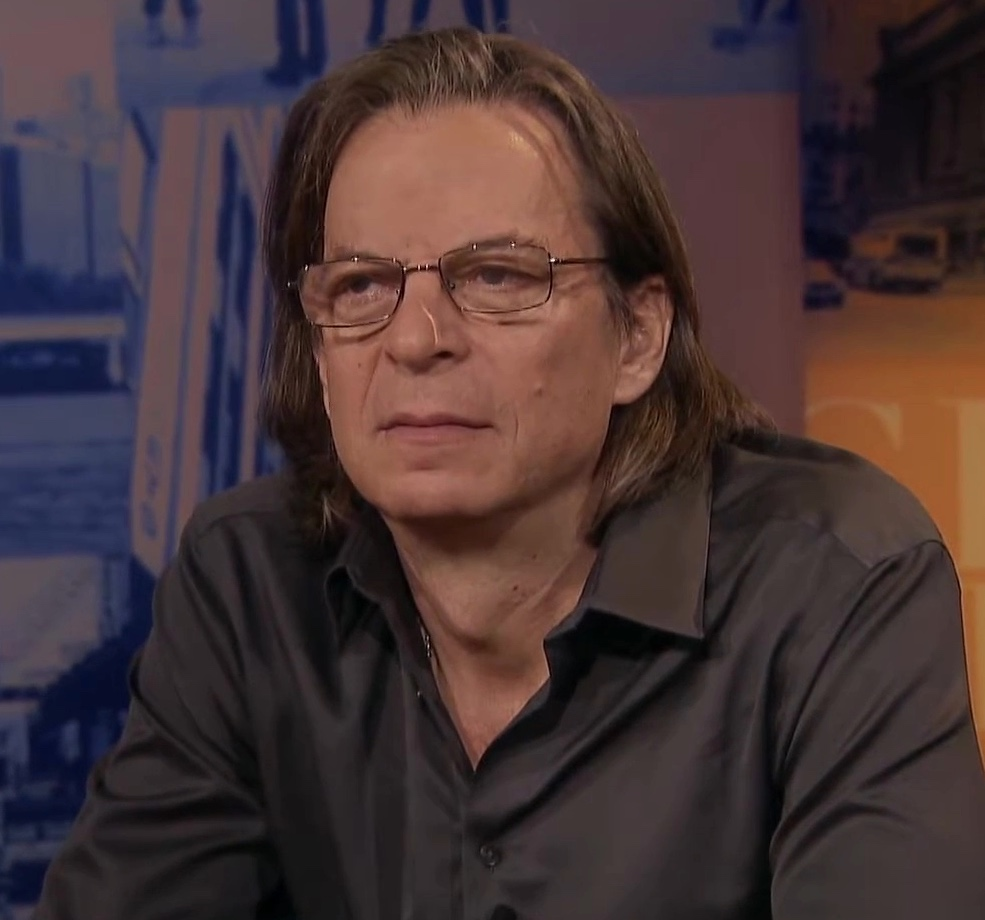
- Strausbaugh on CUNY TV's City Talk, 2013
- Born: 1951 (age 74–75); Baltimore, Maryland, U.S.
- Occupation: Cultural commentator
- Writing career
- Genre: Non-fiction

John Strausbaugh (born 1951, in Baltimore, Maryland) is an American author, cultural commentator, and host of The New York Times Weekend Explorer video podcast series on New York City. Among other topics, he is an authority on the history of New York City.

== Career ==
=== Author ===
His 2016 book, City of Sedition: The History of New York City During the Civil War, chronicles the localized conflicts between New York constituent groups and how their respective actions helped or hampered President Lincoln's war effort. His book, Victory City: A History of New York and New Yorkers during World War II, was issued by Grand Central Publishing in December 2018.

Strausbaugh's 2013 book The Village: 400 Years of Beats and Bohemians, Radicals and Rogues, a History of Greenwich Village (Ecco) explains the tumultuous events that made New York's Greenwich Village the cultural engine of America. The book is described by Kurt Andersen as "the definitive history of America's bohemian wellspring and prototypical modern neighborhood with all the verve and fun and rigor it deserves."

Strausbaugh's previous books have examined the history of recreational drug use (The Drug User: Documents 1840-1960, co-edited with Donald Blaise, with an introduction by William S. Burroughs, 1990), the intersection of politics and popular culture in the White House (Alone With the President, 1992), the priesthood that spreads the gospel of Elvisism (E: Reflections on the Birth of the Elvis Faith, 1995) and Rock and Roll's infidelity to the youth culture that created it (Rock 'Til You Drop: The Decline From Rebellion to Nostalgia, 2001, which was declared “the definitive word on the senescent Rolling Stones” by The New York Times).

Strausbaugh's controversial 2006 book, Black Like You: Blackface, Whiteface, Insult & Imitation in American Popular Culture, explored race relations in popular culture, including the pervasive and long-lasting impact of blackface performance in rock and roll, hip-hop, advertising, “gangsta-lit” and contemporary Hollywood filmmaking. His book Sissy Nation: How America Became a Culture of Wimps & Stoopits was published by Virgin Books USA in 2008. "Straw: Finding My Way," which Strausbaugh collaboratively wrote with Darryl Strawberry, was published on April 28, 2009, by Ecco, a division of HarperCollins publishing.

In 2026, OR Books published Strausbaugh's book on French American artist Marcel Duchamp, titled Duchamp Takes New York.

=== Journalism ===
Strausbaugh has written for The New York Times, The Washington Post, Forbes Magazine, National Review, NPR, The Baltimore Sun, and Cabinet magazine. He served as editor of The New York Press from 1990 until late 2002, when the paper was sold to Avalon Equity Partners. He established the paper as an independent thinking and often irreverent voice, which directly competed with the city's more traditionally liberal downtown paper, The Village Voice.

== Books ==
- Alone with the President (Blast Books, 1994) (ISBN 978-0922233090)
- E: Reflections on the Birth of the Elvis Faith (Blast Books, 1995) (ISBN 978-0922233151)
- Rock 'Til You Drop: The Decline from Rebellion to Nostalgia (Verso, 2003) (ISBN 978-1859844861)
- Black Like You: Blackface, Whiteface, Insult & Imitation in American Popular Culture (Tarcher, 2007) (ISBN 1585425931)
- The Village: 400 Years of Beats and Bohemians, Radicals and Rogues, a History of Greenwich Village (Ecco, 2013) (ISBN 978-0062078193)
- City of Sedition: The History of New York City During the Civil War (Twelve, 2016) (ISBN 978-1455584185)
- Victory City: A History of New York and New Yorkers during World War II (Twelve, 2018) (ISBN 9781455567485)
- Duchamp Takes New York (New York and London: OR Books, 2026) (ISBN 978-1-68219-457-7)
