= Renaldo Kuhler =

American scientific illustrator and artist

Renaldo Gillet Kuhler (born Ronald Otto Louis Kuhler; November 21, 1931 – June 2, 2013) was an American scientific illustrator and outsider artist. He worked for three decades as a scientific illustrator for the North Carolina Museum of Natural Sciences, and spent most of his life creating and illustrating an imaginary country called Rocaterrania.

== Early life ==
Kuhler was born in Teaneck, New Jersey in 1931 to Otto Kuhler, a German industrial designer, and Belgian Simonne Gillet Kuhler. He had one sibling, an older sister named Winona. In 1938, the Kuhler family moved to Blauvelt, in Rockland County, New York. He was sent to various boarding schools as a child, where he was bullied by classmates and teachers. At home, his mother was alternately abusive and neglectful. When Otto Kuhler retired in 1948, he moved the family to Colorado where they lived on the remote KZ Ranch. To cope with the isolation, Kuhler created a fictional world that he called Rocaterrania, after his childhood home of Rockland County.

From 1954 to 1957, he attended the University of Colorado's Denver Extension Center, after which he moved to Boulder. He graduated in 1960 or 1961 with a B.A. in History.

== Career ==
While in college, Kuhler hand-lettered the titles for Stan Brakhage's experimental film Dog Star Man.

After graduating, he worked as a curator of history at the Eastern Washington State Historical Society in Spokane, Washington from 1962 to 1967, after which he returned to Colorado for a two-year program in museology.

In 1969, he moved to Raleigh, North Carolina for a job at the North Carolina Museum of Natural Sciences, where he would work for the next 30 years until his retirement in 1999. For this, he taught himself scientific illustration. In 2001, National Geographic Today profiled him and his work as a scientific illustrator.

== Rocaterrania ==
=== Fictional history ===
Rocaterrania, a small country on the border between Canada and New York State, was fictionally founded in 1931 by former Russian noble August Phillippe Romanovski and his French-Belgian wife, Mary Catherine de Rochelle. August Phillipe declared himself the first Emperor of Rocaterrania, ruling from the capital of Ciudad Eldorado. The small country quickly grew into a mosaic of different cultures as immigrants arrived.

After August Phillipe's death in 1940, his widow ruled as Empress Catherine. Catherine's tyrannical reign included her practice of neuterizing street urchins to turn into her personal "neutant" servants. In 1948, upon Catherine's death, her brother Georg Nicholai de Rochelle became Rocaterrania's third and last emperor. In 1951, a civil war forced the emperor to grant limited autonomy to the region of New Serbia, but his repressive policies were still too intolerable, leading to his overthrow and execution in a revolution in 1953. In a second revolution the next year, socialist revolutionary Gorghendi Kahn was elected. Reviewers have noted that this fictional history parallels the real-world Russian Revolution.

Rocaterrania is religiously diverse, and gave rise to a new syncretic religion called Ojallism (derived from the Spanish word Ojalá), which includes aspects of Judaism, Christianity, and Islam, and reveres Krishna, Buddha, and Baháʼu'lláh as prophets as well.

A new language, Rocaterranski, developed from the many immigrant languages in Rocaterrania, chiefly English, Spanish, German, and Yiddish. Its original writing system was based on the Hebrew alphabet, but it later moved toward a Cyrillic-influenced alphabet.

The history of Rocaterrania parallels Kuhler's own life; when it began as an escapist response to his authoritarian parents, Rocaterrania was an absolute monarchy, but successive oppressive regimes were overthrown as he gained independence, settling into a democracy when he achieved a stable career as an illustrator. Kuhler would often wear costumes he had designed and sewn himself as Rocaterranian fashion or uniforms.

=== Media ===
In 1997, his close friend and colleague Brett Ingram started creating a documentary film, Rocaterrania, about Kuhler's worldbuilding project. It premiered on February 28, 2009 at the Cinequest Film Festival in San Jose, California. His work was exhibited at the American Visionary Art Museum in Baltimore, as well as at the Gregg Museum of Art & Design in Raleigh and the Outsider Art Fair in New York. After his death in June 2013, his work was exhibited at the Halle Saint Pierre in Paris that August.

In 2017, four years after Kuhler's death, Blast Books published a biography, The Secret World of Renaldo Kuhler, written by Ingram and including hundreds of Kuhler's illustrations.

== Personal life ==
Kuhler was a lifelong eccentric, wearing a bowler hat and three-piece suit in college, and smoking mullein from handmade pipes. He never married. He described himself as "urban Amish", never drove a car or used a computer, and only grudgingly exchanged his rotary phone for a touchtone in his later years. He was a staunch liberal and environmentalist, and his tastes and politics are evident in Rocaterrania, whose citizens prefer public transportation, environmental design, and opera (Kuhler played a handmade violin).
