= Blast Books =

American publishing company

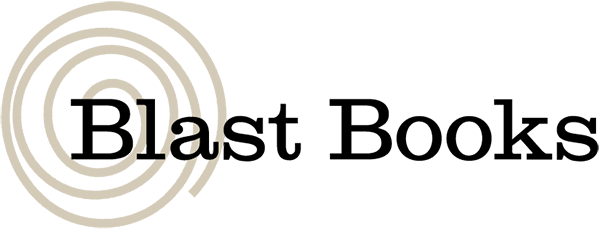
- Status: Active
- Predecessor: Amok Press
- Founded: 1989
- Founders: Laura Lindgren and Ken Swezey
- Country of origin: United States
- Headquarters location: New York, New York
- Distribution: Publishers Group West
- Publication types: Non-fiction books
- Nonfiction topics: Culture, social history, medical history, landscape, language, photography
- Official website: blastbooks.com

Blast Books is a New York-based book publisher whose catalog consists of non-fiction books which focus on cultural and historical subjects, often of an obscure or unusual nature. Many of their publications include archival illustrations and photography.

Blast has published titles by Michael Lesy, Thomas Bernhard, Gretchen Worden, Teller, John Strausbaugh, John Harley Warner, Drew Friedman, Suehiro Maruo, Hideshi Hino, James Edmonson, Ken Smith, Arne Svenson, Steve Young, and others.

== Background ==
Blast Books was founded in 1989 out of the collapse of the publisher Amok Press, which Swezey had founded with Adam Parfrey in 1986. After the publisher collapsed, Parfrey founded his own independent publisher, Feral House, also in 1989. Swezey described Blast Books as a more "grown-up" version of Amok Press.

On March 30, 1989, Stuart Swezey (Ken Swezey's brother) and Brian King of Amok Books (related to but distinct from Amok Press) wrote a letter to LA Weekly saying that Amok Press was defunct. In response to Stuart Swezey and King, Parfrey and Ken Swezey penned a letter to the LA Weekly that denied they were defunct, and said that Feral House and Blast Books would be imprints of Amok Press. This was not the case and both publishers succeeded Amok Press.

== Selected publications ==
Blast has published two large-format photographic books about the Mütter Museum. The first, Mütter Museum of the College of Physicians of Philadelphia (2002), contains images of the museum's exhibits shot by contemporary fine art photographers, including William Wegman, Joel-Peter Witkin, Shelby Lee Adams, and Rosamond Purcell. The second, Mütter Museum Historic Medical Photographs (2007), focuses on the museum's archive of rare historic photographs, most of which were previously unpublished.

Hidden Treasure (2012) was published in conjunction with the National Library of Medicine, the world's largest medical library. The book features artifacts from the library's private collection, dating from the 13th through the 20th century, including color-illustrated medical books; rare manuscripts; pamphlets and ephemera; “magic lantern” slides; toys; stereograph cards; scrapbooks; film stills; posters; and more. Edmonson and Warner's Dissection: Photographs of a Rite of Passage in American Medicine: 1880-1930 (2009) catalogued over 100 previously unpublished archival photographs of students at prominent American medical schools posing alongside dissected cadavers in their anatomy classes.

Blast has produced three books in conjunction with the Center for Land Use Interpretation: Up River: Man-Made Sites of Interest on the Hudson from the Battery to Troy, by Matthew Coolidge (2008), Around the Bay: Man-Made Sites of Interest in the San Francisco Bay Region (2013), and Los Alamos Rolodex: Doing Business with the National Lab, 1967-1978 (2016).

In 2000 Blast published "When I'm Dead All This Will Be Yours!": Joe Teller – A Portrait by His Kid, by Teller (of Penn & Teller) and his father Joe.

Blast's 2013 book, Everything's Coming Up Profits: The Golden Age of Industrial Musicals, by former David Letterman comedy writer Steve Young and cartoonist Sport Murphy, offered the first chronicle of a neglected genre of music history: the theatrical productions staged by corporations to promote new products to their sales force. In 2016, the book rights were acquired by Amblin Entertainment, who announced development of a film production starring Will Ferrell and Kristen Wiig.

Thomas Bernhard: 3 Days, published in 2016, chronicles a three-day park bench monologue by the Austrian novelist, playwright, and poet filmed by Ferry Radax for a 1970 documentary film about Bernhard.

In 2017, Blast published The Secret World of Renaldo Kuhler, the first collection of previously uncirculated illustrations by a prolific and idiosyncratic artist who created a vast body of visionary work without public recognition during his lifetime (1931–2013). (Renaldo was the son of famous railroad designer Otto Kuhler.)

The following year, Blast published Robert McCracken Peck's Specimens of Hair: The Curious Collection of Peter A. Browne. The book is based on "an oddball collection of animal and human hair assembled by an obsessive 19th-century naturalist [which] was at one time deemed worthless by the Academy of Natural Sciences, despite including samples from 13 of the first 14 U.S. presidents."

In 2021 Blast published Michael Lesy's Snapshots 1971-77, a selection of vintage color photos found in a dumpster behind a photo-processing plant in San Francisco and others from a Cleveland drugstore’s trash. "While sitting in those dumpsters, these may have been nothing but simple, banal, discarded personal snapshots — weddings, birthday parties, people posing with new cars or the 12-point buck they just shot — but to see them through Lesy’s eyes they take on an unexpected beauty and profundity," wrote reviewer Jim Knipfel in The Believer. In 2022 Blast published another book by Lesy, Walker Evans: Last Photographs and Life Stories.

Deaths of Artists, published by Blast in 2024, compiled a collection of almost 3,000 artist obituaries originally printed from 1906 to 1929, as found in scrapbooks held in the archives at New York's Metropolitan Museum of Art.

== Founding ==
The company was established in 1989 by Laura Lindgren and Ken Swezey. Lindgren is a professional book designer who edits and designs Blast's titles.
