= Robert K. Brown =

American journalist (1932–2026)

- Brown with a Russian Draganov sniper rifle poses with rebel Milan missile outside of Jalalabad in 1989. This was the first photo proving the rebels had such sophisticated anti-tank systems.
- Born: Robert Kenneth Brown; November 2, 1932; Monroe, Michigan, U.S.
- Died: August 28, 2026 (aged 93)
- Occupation: Journalist
- Military career
- Allegiance: United States of America
- Branch: United States Army
- Service years: 1954–1957; 1964–1985
- Rank: Lieutenant colonel
- Unit: United States Army Special Forces
- Conflicts: Vietnam War
- Awards: Bronze Star; Purple Heart; Air Medal

Robert Kenneth Brown (November 2, 1932 – August 28, 2026) was an American investigative journalist, who was founder, editor and publisher of Soldier of Fortune magazine (SOF), a magazine which reports on various armed confrontations around the world, as well as on new weapons and other military technology. He was also president of Omega Group Ltd, which was the parent group of SOF.

== Background ==
Brown was born on November 2, 1932, in Monroe, Michigan, and grew up in Highland, Michigan. He earned a bachelor's degree in history in 1954 and a master's degree in political science in 1966, both from the University of Colorado at Boulder. On September 22, 1999, Las Vegas, Nevada, Mayor Oscar Goodman issued a proclamation declaring that day to be "Soldier of Fortune Day" and "Lt. Col. Robert K. Brown Day" in honor of Soldier of Fortune magazine, its 20th annual convention in Las Vegas, and its founder and publisher. He died on August 28, 2026, at the age of 93.

== Career ==
Brown served in the U.S. Army from 1954 to 1957 and again from 1964 to 1985. He was a Green Beret, served with Special Forces in Vietnam, and retired from the U.S. Army as a lieutenant colonel. At one point, Brown was the Vice Chairman of the National Rifle Association (NRA).

In 1970, he founded a book publishing firm with Peder Lund named Paladin Press. Brown began publishing Soldier of Fortune in 1975 in Boulder, Colorado. In April 2022, Brown announced he had sold Soldier of Fortune to journalist Susan Katz Keating, a frequent contributor to the magazine.

A Chicago Tribune reporter doing a story on Brown's involvement in the civil war in El Salvador in March 1984 witnessed Brown being accidentally shot when one of Brown's friends pulled the trigger of a gun he thought was unloaded. The friend shot himself through the hand and the bullet struck Brown in the calf. "You stupid son of a bitch, you shot me", Brown said. "And now I can't go to El Salvador."

Editors of Soldier of Fortune instructed Salvadorans in subjects ranging from weapons marksmanship to basic military skills such as water purification. They told The Washington Post, in an article of 1983, they accompanied Salvadoran troops on at least three combat patrols as observers, armed solely with handguns for self-defense and without firing. Alexander McColl, one of the editors that took part in April and August, claimed that expenses were covered by the magazine. These Soldier of Fortune members briefed military personnel of the U.S. embassy on how well Salvadoran soldiers fought in the field.

In 2011, Brown supported Steve Schreiner's campaign for the NRA Board of Directors. Schreiner was not endorsed by the NRA's Nominating Committee.

In 2013, Brown published a book co-authored by "Vann Spencer", who is listed on the book jacket as holding a number of educational degrees, and having taught law and international security at universities in Colorado. "Spencer" is widely believed to be a pseudonym.

== Publications ==
=== Books ===
- I Am Soldier of Fortune: Dancing with Devils. Havertown, Penn.: Casemate (2013). ISBN 978-1612001944.
- Merc: American Soldiers of Fortune, with Jay Mallin. Havertown, Penn.: Casemate (2018). ISBN 1612005918.

=== Articles ===
- "The Plot Against Papa Doc." National Review (Jan. 24, 1967).
- "The Bayo-Pawley Affair," with Miguel Acosta. Soldier of Fortune (Feb. 1976).
- "George W. Bacon, III: A 20th Century Crusader," with Robert Himber. Soldier of Fortune, vol. 1, no. 4 (Fall 1976), pp. 13–19, 76–77.
- "Rhodesia is Ready: It's [sic] Elite Forces are on Red Alert." Soldier of Fortune, vol. 1, no. 3 (Summer 1976), pp. 30–33. Full issue.
- "David Bufkin: American Merc Destroys Cuban Espionage Ring." Soldier of Fortune, vol. 2, no. 3 (Sep. 1977), pp. 25–27.
- "Mitchell Livingston Werbell, III." Firearms News (Feb. 14, 2024).

=== Book contributions ===
- Editor's Notes in Guerrilla Warfare, by Yank Levy. Introduction by Franklin Mark Osanka. Boulder: Paladin Press (1964). pp. 12–14. ISBN 0873640209.

== See also ==
- Soldier of Fortune magazine
- Soldier of Fortune (video game)
