= Rodney A. Smolla =

American author and lawyer

Dean Rodney A. Smolla
- Education: JD, Duke University School of Law; BA, Yale University
- Occupation: Lawyer
- Notable work: Free Speech in an Open Society, Deliberate Intent: A Lawyer Tells the True Story of Murder by the Book

Rodney A. Smolla, is an American author, First Amendment scholar and lawyer. He served as the president of the Vermont Law and Graduate School from 2022 to 2025, and was the 11th president of Furman University from 2010 to 2013.

== Education ==
Smolla went to Yale University as an undergraduate and to Duke University Law School, where he finished first in his class. After his graduation, Smolla served as a clerk for Charles Clark, a judge on the Fifth Circuit Court of Appeals, in 1978–1979.

== Career ==
=== Academic ===
Smolla began his academic career at the DePaul University College of Law in 1980. After teaching at the University of Illinois College of Law, the University of Arkansas School of Law, and the University of Denver College of Law, he served as a professor at William & Mary Law School, where he was also director of the Institute of Bill of Rights Law. He has also served as a visiting professor at Duke University Law School and the university of Melbourne Law School.

In 2003, he was named Dean of the University of Richmond School of Law. Smolla became Dean of Washington and Lee University School of Law in July 2007, where he established their innovative third-year law program. He was the 11th president of Furman University from 2010 to 2013. From 2015 to 2022, Smolla served as the dean of the Widener University Delaware Law School.

From 2022 to 2025, he served as the president of the Vermont Law and Graduate School.

=== Legal work ===
In 2002, Smolla argued Virginia v. Black before the Supreme Court of the United States. The case revolved around the constitutionality of Virginia's cross burning statute.

In 2017, in the aftermath of the violent “Unite the Right” rally in Charlottesville, Virginia, Smolla was appointed by Gov. Terry McAuliffe to serve as a special advisor on First Amendment issues to the Governor’s Task Force on Public Safety, Preparedness and Response to Civil Unrest.

Smolla was the director of the Annenberg Washington Program Libel Reform Project, and author of the Annenberg Libel Reform Report that emerged from the blue ribbon task force on that project. He has also testified before the Senate Judiciary Committee on the topic of the reporter's privilege.

Since July 2025, Smolla has been Senior Counsel at Meier Watkins Phillips Pusch LLP, a top U.S. law firm for First Amendment Litigation (Mainly Plaintiff) and High Net Worth Defamation & Reputation Management.

Smolla serves on the board of directors of the Media General Corporation.

== Writing ==
Smolla is the author of several books on the law and First Amendment issues, including Jerry Falwell v. Larry Flynt: The First Amendment on Trial, and Deliberate Intent: A Lawyer Tells the True Story of Murder by the Book. Deliberate Intent described his involvement as attorney for the plaintiffs in the notorious Hit Man book case. Smolla successfully represented the families of three murder victims in a suit against the publisher of a murder instruction manual used by a hit man for guidance to carry out the murders. The book was made into a television movie by Fox and the FX Cable Network, and actor Timothy Hutton portrayed Smolla. His book Free Speech in an Open Society: Charlottesville and the Politics of Hate won the William O. Douglas Prize. The piece gave an insider's perspective on the events surrounding the 2017 Charlottesville rally and the complexities of First Amendment rights in such contexts. He edited A Year in the Life of the Supreme Court, which won the ABA Silver Gavel Award.

Smolla has also written extensively for the legal academic world, including the legal treatise Smolla and Nimmer on Freedom of Speech (Thomson Reuters West, 3 volumes, 1996); Federal Civil Rights Acts (West Group, 2 volumes, 1994); and Law of Defamation (Thomson Reuters West 2nd Edition 2000, 2 volumes); and Law of Lawyer Advertising (2 volumes, Thomson Reuters West 2006). He is also the author of a case book on First Amendment law, The First Amendment: Freedom of Expression, Regulation of Mass Media, Freedom of Religion (Carolina Academic Press 1999), and the co-author of a constitutional law case book, Constitutional Law: Structure and Rights in Our Federal System with Professor William Banks, 6th Edition, Lexis Nexis 2010.
