= Amok Press =

Defunct American publishing house

- Status: Defunct
- Founded: 1986
- Founder: Adam Parfrey; Ken Swezey
- Defunct: 1988
- Successor: Feral House, Blast Books
- Country of origin: United States
- Headquarters location: New York City
- Publication types: Books

Amok Press was an American publishing house founded by Adam Parfrey and Ken Swezey in 1986, based in New York City. They were known for their controversial books. Their first publications were an English translation of Michael, a novel by Nazi propaganda minister Joseph Goebbels, and Apocalypse Culture, an anthology of the controversial and transgressive, which became a cult classic.

Amok Press stemmed from the similar and often confused, but separate, mail order catalogue and bookstore Amok Books. It was one of many independent publishers that arose in the 1980s, though was one of the more right-leaning. Despite the success of its initial books, Amok Press was short lived, and published only eight books before shuttering. After it closed, it was succeeded by the publishers Blast Books, founded by Swezey, and Feral House, founded by Parfrey.

== Background and founding ==
Amok Press was founded in mid-1986 by friends Adam Parfrey and Ken Swezey, based in New York City. They operated out of Swezey's apartment in the East Village of New York City. Swezey was then the operator of a small printing business, and said he intended to use it to "take risks on books dealing with taboos and heresy". Parfrey was, at the time, a used book wholesaler, and had co-created the Exit magazine. The name Amok Press comes from the term amok, "in a frenzied, murderous manner".

In what writer Spencer Sunshine described as an "extremely confusing situation", Amok Press was distinct yet related to the Los Angeles-based Amok Books (also called the Amok Store, the Amok Bookstore, or Amok), a mail order catalogue, bookstore, and later itself a book publisher, which was run by Ken Swezey's brother Stuart Swezey and Brian King. The catalog was established in 1985, focusing on the strange and deviant. King was also affiliated with Ken Swezey and Adam Parfrey. Alternatively, Amok as a group has been seen as an entity leading both enterprises. They were, to some extent, interrelated; Lisa Rosset writing for The Boston Phoenix described Amok Books and Amok Press as "a mail order catalogue and book store on the West Coast and a separate publishing company on the East Coast", but both based on "a group of entrepreneurs [...] calling their enterprise Amok", both "masterminding this new affront to conventional sensibilities". Some sources completely conflate them, or say one was the enterprise of the other, but they were independent.

Parfrey was affiliated with the Amok catalog, and Ken Swezey helped the operators of Amok Books. According to Parfrey, he convinced Swezey, then working for Amok Books, to start their own publishing business covering similar materials to the catalog. Amok the catalogue and book store continued to exist after Amok Press closed, and afterwards Amok became a book publisher as Amok Books.

== History and activities ==
=== Book publishing ===
Editing, typesetting, design and publicity were initially done in-house by Parfrey and Swezey. Writer Charles Schneider assisted both Amok Press and Amok Books. It functioned as an underground press. It was one of several independent publishers that sprung up in the 1980s. Other independent publishers that emerged at about the same time included Autonomedia, RE/Search Publications, and Loompanics. Compared to those, Amok Press was more right-leaning in the books it published. Parfrey was its co-editor. They declared their aims to be promoting resistance to good taste and the existing consensus. The Daily Telegraph described it as "wild and anti-authoritarian". Parfrey said that "Most people in our culture are like zombies from a George Romero movie. Our books offer strong medicine for a shallow world."

The first books published by Amok appeared the year after its founding, in 1987, which had them publish two books. Its first book, published that year, was an English translation of Michael by Nazi propaganda minister Joseph Goebbels, with the translation by Joachim Neugroschel. Almost immediately, it was a success, their first book being reviewed in The New York Times, a surprise for the first book for a new publisher. Despite this success, many reviews were critical, with a reviewer from The New Republic accusing Parfrey of attempting to start a "neo-Nazi revival". This made Parfrey take a step back from his plans to publish a book by the neo-Nazi James Mason, about George Lincoln Rockwell.

Amok Press also published Apocalypse Culture that year. "Apocalypse Culture" is also the name of the milieu around Amok Press. Content was controversial and ranged from conspiracy theories to the occult to neo-Nazism. The book was very successful and became a cult hit; by mid-1988 it was on its third printing. In 1988, Amok Press published The Manson File, an anthology of writings on Charles Manson that declares him "one of the last true heretics of our time". This book was a success and underground hit for Parfrey. Other titles, like Boxcar Bertha, saw less success. After initial successes, its later publications were commercial failures.

=== Dissolution ===
The publisher fell apart in late 1988. The parting of Swezey and Parfrey into their respective publishing houses was said to be amicable, but Parfrey later said in an interview that the break happened when he moved to Portland; he said it "could've worked out, but there was some issues, too, going on with Ken and his brother with the Amok Catalog and then it was like, there's this in-fighting going on", so they decided to split. On March 30, 1989, Stuart Swezey and Brian King of Amok Books wrote a letter to LA Weekly saying that Amok Press was defunct. In response to Stuart Swezey and King, Parfrey and Ken Swezey penned a letter to the LA Weekly that denied they were defunct, and said that Feral House and Blast Books would be imprints of Amok Press. This was not the case and both publishers succeeded Amok Press. Parfrey said that "it made sense to go our own routes at that time and that's what happened".

The final Amok Press book was 1989's Rants and Incendiary Tracts, edited by Parfrey and the anarchist Bob Black, co-published with Loompanics Unlimited. The book had a mix of leftist thinkers and far-righters; its original co-editor was Hakim Bey, who left the project and denounced Parfrey due to what he called Parfrey's "strangely reactionary mind-set". The denunciation itself appeared in the book. Black later denounced Parfrey. Amok Press published eight books in total before closing.

== Influence and legacy ==
After leaving Amok Press, Parfrey moved to Los Angeles and founded the independent publisher Feral House in 1989. Feral House succeeded Amok Press and published similar materials; Parfrey used a $5,000 profit from Amok Press to found Feral House. Feral House also reissued Apocalypse Culture. Amok Press was also succeeded by the publisher Blast Books, which was established by Swezey. Swezey described Blast Books as a more "grown-up" version of Amok Press. Amok Press published several titles that were well received, especially Apocalypse Culture, which became an underground hit and cult classic.

== List of books published ==
- Michael (1987) by Joseph Goebbels, translation by Joachim Neugroschel
- Apocalypse Culture (1987) edited by Adam Parfrey
- The Manson File (1988) edited by Nikolas Schreck
- You Can't Win: The Autobiography of Jack Black (1988) by Jack Black, foreword by William S. Burroughs
- Boxcar Bertha: An Autobiography (1988) by Ben Reitman, introduction by Kathy Acker, afterword by Roger A. Bruns
- Disneyland of the Gods (1988) by John Keel
- The Grand Guignol: Theater of Fear and Terror (1988) by Mel Gordon
- Rants and Incendiary Tracts (1989) edited by Bob Black and Adam Parfrey
