= Soldier of Fortune (magazine) =

Magazine

- July 1998 cover
- Categories: paramilitary
- Frequency: Daily web magazine
- Founded: 1975
- Company: Soldier of Fortune
- Country: United States
- Based in: Tampa, Florida
- Language: English, many others
- Website: sofmag.com

Soldier of Fortune (SOF), subtitled The Journal of Professional Adventurers, is a daily American web magazine founded in 1975 by Robert K. Brown. It began as a monthly U.S. periodical published from 1975 to 2016 as a magazine devoted to worldwide reporting of wars, including conventional warfare, low-intensity warfare, counter-insurgency, and counter-terrorism. It was published by Omega Group Ltd., based in Boulder, Colorado. In May 2022, author, editor, and security journalist Susan Katz Keating bought the publication from Brown.

== History ==
Soldier of Fortune magazine was founded in 1975, by Lieutenant Colonel, U.S. Army Reserve, (Ret.) Robert K. Brown, who served with Special Forces in Vietnam. After retiring from active duty, Brown began publishing a “circular”, magazine-type publication with few pages which contained information on mercenary employment in Oman, which had recently undergone a coup and was battling a communist insurgency. Brown's small circular soon evolved into a glossy, large-format, full-color magazine.

Significant to the early development of SOF was its role in the recruitment of foreign nationals to serve in the Rhodesian Security Forces, during the Rhodesian Bush War (1964–1979). By 1976, Soldier of Fortune was selling 120,000 copies per month, making it into one of the most popular American magazines of the 1970s. Soldier of Fortune was ostensibly intended for mercenaries and "professional adventurers", but Brown said most readers were the "Walter Mitty market", referring to men who fantasized about being mercenaries.

In 2018, American historian Kyle Burke wrote that the popularity of Soldier of Fortune was due to white male backlash against the rise of feminism and the rise of the civil rights movement, and that the majority of the readers of Soldier of Fortune were white men who resented feminists and "uppity" non-white people, especially African Americans. According to Burke the stories in Soldier of Fortune, describing with great relish how a mere handful of white mercenaries could almost effortlessly defeat hordes of black guerrillas, were thinly veiled racist fantasies that were meant to establish the superiority of white men over black men. Likewise, the stories in Soldier of Fortune celebrated the machismo and womanizing of the mercenary sub-culture as the male ideal.

Burke described Brown as a "passionate supporter" of the white supremacist government of Rhodesia, and Soldier of Fortune glorified Rhodesia as a place where it was still possible to "Be a Man Among Men". From 1972 onward the government of Rhodesia was engaged in a war against the black guerrillas of the Soviet-backed Zimbabwe People's Revolutionary Army (ZIPRA) and the Chinese-backed Zimbabwe African National Liberation Army (ZANLA). A major problem for Rhodesia was the black population vastly outnumbered the white population. Most of the white population of Rhodesia had only arrived in the years 1955–1960, meaning their roots in Rhodesia were not that deep.

During the Bush War, about 13,395 whites left Rhodesia annually, which were losses that Rhodesia could ill afford, given the small number of whites compared to blacks. The white flight caused by the Bush War led to the Rhodesian Army having significant problems in maintaining enough white soldiers to continue the war. The Rhodesian military had much difficulty in replacing men killed or wounded in the war, and by 1977 the Rhodesian security forces had been pushed to their breaking point by manpower shortages. By 1977, the Rhodesian security forces were on the defensive and had been forced to cede control of vast areas of rural Rhodesia to the ZIPRA and ZANLA guerrillas, owing to manpower shortages. Rhodesia was trapped in a vicious circle, as the Rhodesian forces lost control of more of the countryside, and more whites chose to leave. As the "white flight" continued, the more the Rhodesians continued to lose.

Unlike South Africa, whose white population was both larger and longer established, Rhodesia was highly dependent upon recruiting white men from abroad to replace its losses in the war. Brown was inspired to found Soldier of Fortune in 1975 after a visit to Rhodesia, where an American friend, a veteran of the Vietnam war who was now serving the para-military British South Africa Police (which despite its name was the police force of Rhodesia), told him that Rhodesia was losing the war because of a shortage of white manpower.

Brown was well aware that Rhodesia was losing the Bush War and used Soldier of Fortune as a forum to recruit soldiers for Rhodesia. Brown worked closely with the chief recruiting officer of the Rhodesian Army, Major Nick Lamprecht, on using Soldier of Fortune to recruit white American men for the Rhodesian Army. Lamprecht wrote in an article in Soldier of Fortune urging white American men to come to fight for Rhodesia, writing that: "Rhodesia has many things to offer. Good Rhodesian beer, a friendly populace, and what I would describe as a free and easy, unhurried way of life, lots of wide open spaces".

As a further inducement, Lamprecht promised that it would be easy for single white men to find a suitable wife in Rhodesia. The stories about Rhodesia in Soldier of Fortune depicted Rhodesia as a "paradise where women and black people still knew their place" , as the articles urged their readers to enlist in the Rhodesian Army in order to defend Rhodesia against the black guerrillas. One story about Rhodesia stated: "What we have here is an ideal core of white people who are able to raise the standards of living among the Africans. Without us, conditions will decline rapidly".

The quality of recruits that came to Rhodesia varied widely. Some such as L.H. "Mike" Williams and Michael Pierce, both veterans of the U.S. Army who had fought in Vietnam, had successful careers in the Rhodesian Army. One of the first Americans to go to Rhodesia was John Alan Corey, a veteran of the Vietnam war who joined the Rhodesian Light Infantry Regiment and who was killed in action in July 1975. Corey was celebrated as a martyr for freedom in an article in Soldier of Fortune, which approvingly published an excerpt from a letter written by Corey shortly before his death, where he declared: "Since coming to Rhodesia, I have often heard people remark that it's "inevitable" for this country and all of southern Africa to follow the 'winds of change' and go the same way as the other former colonies to the north. This is rubbish and only indicates a lack of fighting spirit, guts and the will to rule a civilization built by better men".

The reference to the "winds of change" in Corey's letter was to a 1960 speech given by the British Prime Minister Harold Macmillan in South Africa, where he stated that a "wind of change" was sweeping across Africa and that the apartheid system was doomed. The majority of the Americans who went to Rhodesia were not veterans of the Vietnam war nor had they served in the U.S. military. The majority of men who had never seen war before flinched in the face of its horrors and chose to desert. One article in Soldier of Fortune in 1979 complained: "The majority found the routine too rough to last more than a few months. The desertion rate among the American citizens who have joined the Rhodesian Army over the last two years is estimated to run at about 80 percent".

In the late 1970s and the 1980s, the success and popularity of a military magazine such as SOF led to the proliferation of like magazines such as Survive, Gung Ho!, New Breed, Eagle, Combat Illustrated, Special Weapons and Tactics, and Combat Ready. SOF was published by the Omega Group Ltd., in Boulder, Colorado. At the height of its circulation in the early 1980s the magazine had 190,000 subscribers.

In the 1980s, Soldier of Fortune ran ads promising to take Americans to fight in Afghanistan, but relatively few actually went. The city of Peshawar on the Khyber Pass that forms one of the main routes into Afghanistan along the Afghan-Pakistani border was described being full of Americans who were "Walter Mitty types" who talked loudly of coming into Afghanistan. All of the available evidence suggests that only a small number of the American volunteers actually crossed the border, and of those who crossed the frontier, an even a smaller number survived Afghanistan and returned.

More successful for Soldier of Fortune was its efforts to promote Americans to assist the Contra rebels against the Sandinista regime in Nicaragua, in part due to geographical proximity, and because the Central Intelligence Agency was more encouraging of American volunteers for the Contras. At a time when the Boland Amendment was in effect, which banned American assistance to the Contras, in May 1985 General John K. Singlaub recruited Brown to use Soldier of Fortune to recruit Americans who as private citizens would train and arm the Contras. The assignment was meant to provide the Reagan administration with the necessary "plausible deniability" that it was not attempting to circumvent Congress, which had banned assistance to the Contras. Singlaub retired from the U.S. Army in 1979, but he was working unofficially for the National Security Council in the 1980s, which he bombarded with various plans to overthrow the Sandinistas.

Brown accepted the assignment and recruited several of the mercenaries he recruited to fight for Rhodesia in the 1970s to go with him to Honduras to train the Contras. Brown and his assorted mercenaries went to Camp Las Vegas on the Nicaraguan-Honduran border, along with a consignment of arms from the United States. Brown said of the Contras "these people had no military training at all" and stated his mission "could hardly be called a resounding success" as all of the Contras he had trained as spies were captured by the Sandinistas and executed. The Contra war in Nicaragua was covered extensively in Soldier of Fortune in the 1980s, but Brown did not mention that he had been hired to train the Contras and instead presented himself and the other mercenaries as journalists covering the war.

=== Online magazine ===
The April 2016 issue of Soldier of Fortune was the final print edition. Further editions have been published online. The magazine is published by Soldier of Fortune LLC, owned by Susan Katz Keating.

In the online magazine, publisher Keating revived original reporting, and sent correspondents into the field in Ukraine, Serbia, Israel, and along the southern U.S. border with Mexico. She introduced a new section entitled The Fire Pit, where readers submit personal stories of war and adventure. Among those whose stories appear in the section are Gen.(Ret) Scott Miller, formerly the four-star general in charge of U.S. forces in Afghanistan and Jan Scruggs, founder of the Vietnam Memorial Wall, along with numerous warfighters and veterans.

The magazine gained publicity in July 2023 when Keating published her investigative series on the cocaine packet that was discovered inside the Biden White House. The articles were picked up by Radar Online, the New York Post, and other outlets.

Keating was featured in a profile in The New Yorker Magazine, in an article that appeared online on September 2, 2024, and in print in the issue dated September 12, 2024.

== "Gun for Hire" lawsuits ==
During the late 1980s, Soldier of Fortune under Robert K. Brown was sued in civil court several times for having published classified advertisements by private "guns for hire." In 1987, Norman Norwood of Arkansas sued SOF magazine because of injuries he suffered during a murder attempt by two men hired via a "Gun for Hire" advertisement in the magazine. The magazine settled the lawsuit out of court.

On February 20, 1985, John Wayne Hearn shot and killed Sandra Black for a $10,000 payment from her husband, Robert Vannoy Black Jr. Black connected with Hearn through a classified advertisement published in Soldier of Fortune, wherein Hearn solicited "high-risk assignments. U.S. or overseas." In 1989, Sandra Black's son Gary and her mother Marjorie Eimann filed a wrongful-death lawsuit against SOF magazine and its parent publishing company Omega Group Ltd., seeking $21 million in redress of their grievance. The jury found the defendants grossly negligent in publishing Hearn's ad for implicit illegal activity (murder) and awarded the plaintiffs $9.5 million in damages. In 1990, the United States Court of Appeals for the Fifth Circuit reversed the verdict, saying that the standard of conduct imposed upon the magazine was too high because the advertisement was ambiguously worded. Robert Black was executed for his wife's murder in 1992. In addition to Sandra Black's murder, John Wayne Hearn was also convicted of carrying out two other contract killings in Florida. The victims were Cecil Batie and John Banister, who were killed in January and February 1985 respectively.

In 1989, four men were convicted of conspiracy to murder in the 1985 contract killing of Richard Braun of Atlanta, Georgia. The men involved were Sean Trevor Doutre, Richard Savage, Bruce Gastwirth and John Horton Moore. The group were hired through a classified services advertisement published in SOF magazine that read: "GUN FOR HIRE." Braun's sons filed a civil lawsuit against the magazine, and a jury found in their favor, awarding them $12.37 million in damages, which the judge later reduced to $4.37 million. In 1992, the United States Court of Appeals for the Eleventh Circuit upheld the judgment of the jury, saying "the publisher could recognize the offer of criminal activity as readily as its readers did." In 1993, the United States Supreme Court allowed the judgment to stand when it refused to hear the case. The magazine subsequently suspended publication of classified advertisements. Doutre and Savage were also convicted of the November 1985 murder of Anita Spearman, who was killed near Palm Beach Gardens, Florida. Doutre was given a life sentence while Savage received 40 years. Savage died in 2011 and Doutre in 2025.

In 2022, publisher Keating affirmed that under her management, the magazine would not publish such advertisements.

== Editors ==
- Jim Graves, former managing editor and columnist.
- Susan Katz Keating, editor and publisher, as of March 30, 2022.

== Notable contributors ==
- Cpl. Jan Scruggs, founder of the Vietnam Memorial Wall
- Col. David "Hack" Hackworth, US Army (ret./deceased)
- Maj. Robert C. MacKenzie, US Army (ret./deceased)
- Lt. Col. Oliver North, US Marine Corps (ret.)
- Capt. Dale Dye, US Marine Corps (ret.)
- Acting Leading Seaman Al J Venter
- Maj. John Plaster, US Army (ret.)
