= Loompanics =

American book publisher (1975–2006)

Loompanics Enterprises, Inc. (d.b.a Loompanics Unlimited)
- Loompanics Logo
- Type: Private
- Industry: Publishing, Catalog book sales
- Founded: 1975
- Defunct: May 8, 2006
- Headquarters: Port Townsend, Washington
- Key people: Michael Hoy, President, Book editor Lou Rollins, Proof reader Gia Cosindas, Publicist
- Products: Books

Loompanics Unlimited was an American book seller and publisher specializing in nonfiction on generally unconventional or controversial topics. The topics in their title list included drugs, weapons, survivalism, anarchism, sex, conspiracy theories, and so on. Many of their titles describe some kind of illicit or extralegal actions, such as Counterfeit I.D. Made Easy and Opium for the Masses, while others are purely informative, such as Uninhabited Ocean Islands, How to Buy Land Cheap and The Muckraker's Manual (recommended by Stewart Brand).

== Company history ==
Loompanics was in business for nearly 30 years. Its publisher and editor was Michael "Mike" Hoy who started Loompanics Unlimited in East Lansing, Michigan, in 1975. In 1982 he moved the business to Port Townsend, Washington, where his friend and fellow publisher R. W. Bradford had earlier relocated.

In January 2006, Loompanics announced that it was going out of business, and that it was selling off its inventory. In the spring of 2006, Paladin Press announced that it acquired the rights to 40 titles previously published or sold by Loompanics, including the works of Claire Wolfe, Eddie the Wire, and other popular Loompanics authors.

== Market position ==
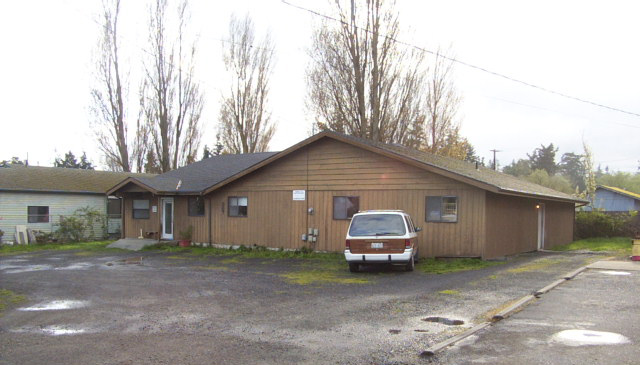
Former "world headquarters" of Loompanics in Port Townsend, Washington

In addition to Loompanics' large annual catalog of all its stock, Loompanics regularly mailed its customers a thinner quarterly supplement featuring a selection of books interspersed with articles about government propaganda and conspiracies, and/or underground resistance. The large, therefore, costly $5 catalog was never free in the US unless accompanied by a paid order. The catalog was also offered internationally for a price determined by country of delivery. The addressing side of the cover included a World War II American graphic of an eagle carrying a stack of volumes and the slogan, "Our men want books!"

Loompanics did not fall into the categories of mainstream liberal, conservative, or libertarian politics. While Michael Hoy expresses a preference for free markets, he also criticizes libertarians for championing multinational corporations, which he describes in a 2005 article as being entirely different entities from individuals. Hoy characterizes them as governmental entities, since their limited liability is the result of government fiat, rather than contractual dealings among individuals. Thus, in some ways, Hoy argues, corporations have more rights than individuals. He also criticized libertarians for brainwashing themselves, stating:

"Libertarian" followers have been taught numerous thought-stopping techniques by "Libertarian" leaders, so that anyone who attempts to discuss the non-market reality of corporations is slapped with a negative label ("anti-corporate," "anti-trade," etc. — there are lots), and then any questions raised by that person are literally unthinkable to "Libertarians."

Hoy's articles, which systemically lambasted the policies of all major political groups, earned him the wrath of organizations across the political spectrum.

Loompanics' FAQ stated that the company's name is a play on words inspired by Hoy's fondness for National Lampoon.

== Advertising rejections ==
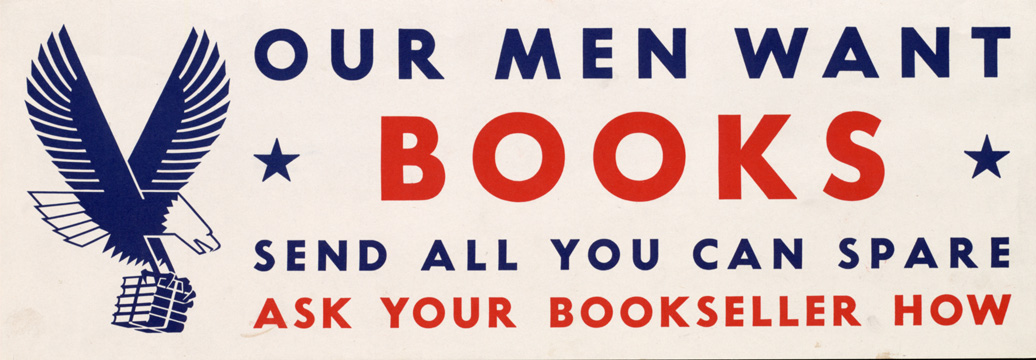
WWII graphic, appearing on each printed catalog.

According to Gia Cosindas, Amazon.com, eBay, and Google refused to allow Loompanics to advertise on their sites, since some of the books' content violates their editorial guidelines. Specifically, Google wrote, "At this time, Google policy does not permit the advertisement of websites that contain 'the promotion of violence [and] drugs or drug paraphernalia.'"

== Legacy and aftermath ==
On May 8, 2006, Loompanics stopped accepting retail orders. Their website encouraged potential customers to contact other publishers, who have had several Loompanics titles transferred to them, or became the new publishers of established Loompanics authors.

Last Earth Distro, Last Word Books & Press, AK Press, Earthlight Books, Eden Press, FS Books, Laissez Faire Books, Lehman's, New Falcon Publications, Privacy Alert Online, Ronin Press, Steve Arnold's Gun Room and Uncle Fester's Books acquired most of Loompanics' back stock. Some titles have been reprinted by Paladin Press and Delta Press.

== Publications ==
- Loompanics' Golden Records: Articles & Features from the Best Book Catalog in the World! (1993).
  - Republished by Microcosm Publishing.
- Loompanics Unlimited Catalog (1994).
- Loompanics Unlimited Catalog (2003).
