= Exit (American magazine) =

American art magazine

EXIT
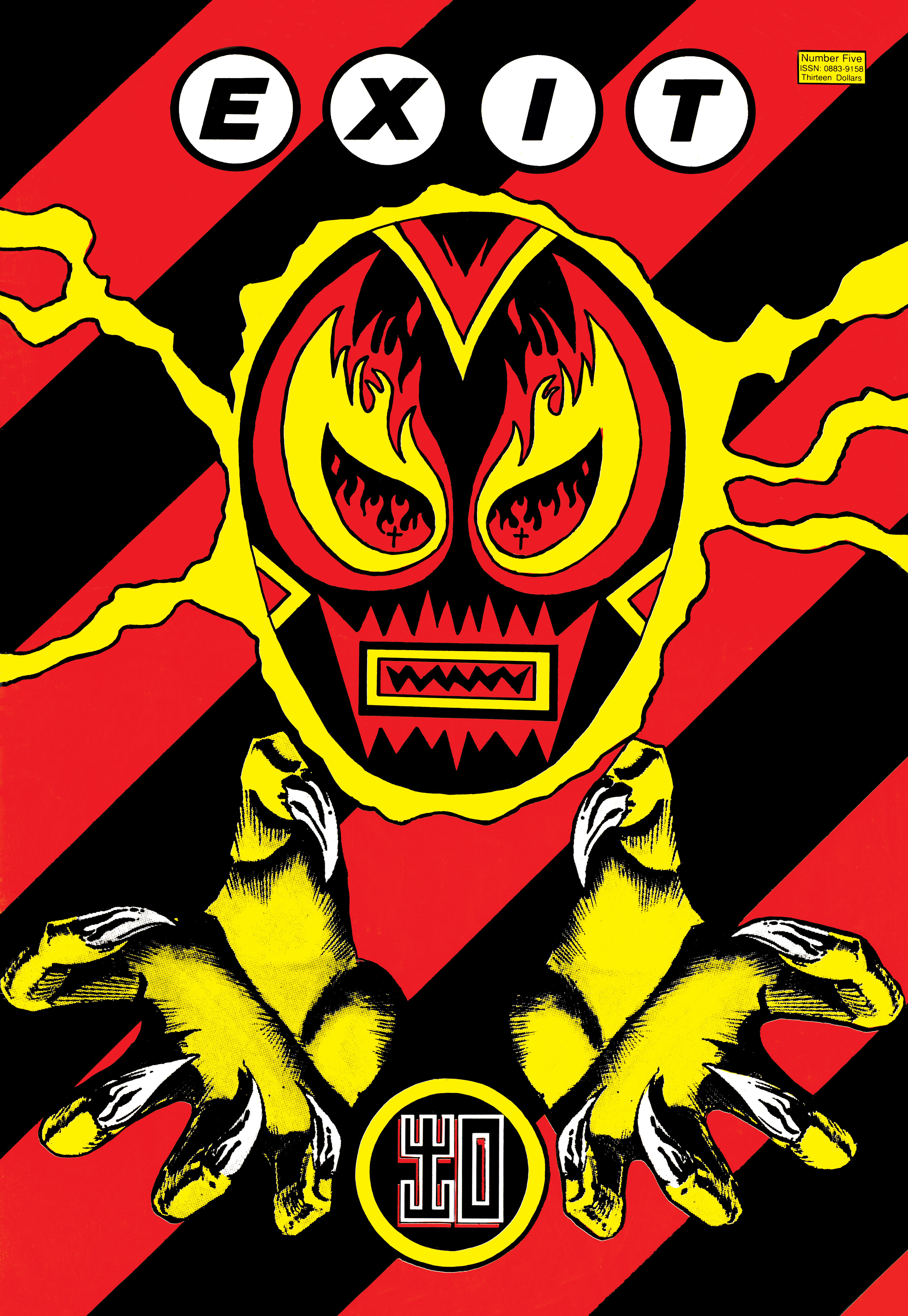
- Cover of issue #5 by JG Thirlwell
- Editor: George Petros
- Editor: Adam Parfrey
- Categories: Graphics
- Frequency: Irregular
- Publisher: George Petros
- Founder: Adam Parfrey and George Petros
- First issue: 1984
- Final issue Number: 1991 #5 (#6 unfinished, later appeared online)
- Country: United States
- Based in: New York City, New York, U.S.
- Language: English
- Website: exitmagazine.net
- ISSN: 0883-9158
- OCLC: 12244834

Exit (stylized as EXIT) was an American art magazine. The magazine was founded and co-edited by Adam Parfrey and George Petros, though Parfrey left after the third issue in 1987. The magazine was based in New York City. Five issues were published from 1984 to 1991, with a sixth unfinished issue being published online and in collections later. It contained contributions from, among others, Anton LaVey, Robert Williams, Raymond Pettibon, Joe Coleman, Boyd Rice, S. Clay Wilson, Mark Mothersbaugh, H. R. Giger, GG Allin, Genesis P-Orridge, James Earl Ray, James Mason, and Richard Ramirez.

Its creators described Exit as an "outlaw liberal Fascist Sci-Fi Pop Art magazine", and it was part of the broader "apocalypse culture" milieu of the transgressive. The magazine was controversial for its provocative and shocking contents, including pornographic and violent imagery and themes. It was also known for its repeated odes to cult leader Charles Manson and its neo-Nazi content. The magazine shuttered in 1991, with its issues collected in several anthology volumes and later distributed online.

== History ==
The magazine was founded by Adam Parfrey and George Petros in 1984 and the first issue appeared that year. The magazine was published out of New York City. Petros and Parfrey had a sometimes contentious, up-and-down relationship, both in publishing the magazine and outside of it. Parfrey said the only similar contemporary was the comics magazine Raw, but that they had wanted to push it further than in Raw. While working on Exit, Petros also worked on Seconds, a music magazine with several of the same contributors.

The magazine was banned for distribution in American prisons and in some foreign countries; several distributors refused to pick it up. The second issue was released in 1985, and the third issue was published in early 1987. After the third issue, Parfrey, describing Petros as a "prima donna", quit the magazine. Issue #4 was released in 1989, and #5 in 1991. Through the publisher Tacit, Petros published The Exit Collection in 1998.

According to Petros, the magazine's release schedule was hampered by the unreliableness of most of its contributors. Exit #6 was originally intended for release in 1992, which did not materialize. Petros still planned to release a sixth issue as of April 1994, which he said would include works from and Kim Seltzer and Jim Goad from Answer Me! magazine. This did not materialize and it was never published in magazine form, as it remained unfinished, though was later released online and in another collection.

== Format and contents ==
The magazine was printed on large, 11''x14'' pages. The magazine was focused on graphic design and art, and included collages, text, and artwork. Petros and Parfrey, both co-editors, described Exit as an "outlaw liberal Fascist Sci-Fi Pop Art magazine". Contributors included, among others, Robert Williams, Raymond Pettibon, Joe Coleman, Boyd Rice, S. Clay Wilson, Mark Mothersbaugh, Genesis P-Orridge, and GG Allin. Issues also included contributions from several notorious murderers like John Wayne Gacy, Richard Ramirez, and Mark David Chapman. The cover art and some illustrations were in some instances done by JG Thirlwell. In addition to new contributions, it mixed graphics and text from many sources and excerpted the writings of Friedrich Nietzsche, Richard Wagner, and Charles Manson.

Contents were largely nihilistic and negative, as well as regularly pornographic in nature, and included images of sexual violence and rape, fascist, Nazi, and racist themes with numerous swastikas, or Satanic in nature. The magazine explored serial killers, racism, extremism, eugenics, and sadomasochism. Parfrey later said that they had included things in the magazine that "that would cause a fuss just by the type of artists there were and the format, things we would put in that magazine and it was a little unseemly." The magazine functioned as one of the key outlets of the broader milieu its editors wrote in, dubbed "apocalypse culture" by Parfrey, which discussed deviant ideas like fascism, brainwashing, magic, and the end of the world. Content was often neo-fascist, neo-Nazi, or white supremacist in nature. Petros said of his own thoughts on the subject matter that he "support[s] all political and sexual extremism, because the extremists are the ones with the passionate spark that keep history going along" and said that "only by facing every cardinal point of an issue can you be absolutely free".

In a letter to James Mason in 1986, Parfrey described Exit as a periodical that "repudiates the kind of liberal humanism which is infecting this country like a plague" and as a "propaganda tool" to "legitimize a certain type of thought among race-mixing and otherwise polluted people". Issues later included flyers and works from Mason. The first issue ran a section on Jim Jones's final sermon prior to the Jonestown mass suicide and pictures of Adolf Hitler with a child; the second issue was far more Nazi focused, with several sections espousing fascist themes and symbolism. Issue #3 was even more Nazi focused, and featured as its cover a picture of a universe with Adolf Hitler as its center, created by Petros and Parfrey. That issue they ran a celebration of cult leader Charles Manson written by Parfrey entitled "The Book of Charlie", which also included photos of Hitler photoshopped with the heads of the Beatles; Parfrey declares the Beatles to be "vulgar simpletons" who were, despite this "messengers of the Gods [...] harbingers of Helter-Skelter". That issue also included a spread from Boyd Rice which included quotes from Manson and Richard Wagner.

The sixth issue contained a special section on Charles Mason, with transcriptions of aphorisms from many of his interviews, illustrated by, among others, H. R. Giger, Genesis P-Orridge, James Mason, assassin James Earl Ray, serial killers Richard Ramirez, Henry Lee Lucas, and Ottis Toole. The section concludes with a framed paragraph from Church of Satan founder Anton LaVey, where LaVey wrote a sarcastic ode to Mason that declared "the American people owe Charles Manson a debt of gratitude. [...] He is omnipresent and has been very generous with his time in helping others to cope with the pain of their own insignificance."

== Contributors ==
- John Aes-Nihil
- GG Allin
- Nick Bougas
- Mark David Chapman
- Joe Coleman
- Cop Shoot Cop
- H. R. Giger
- Killing Joke
- Richard Kern
- Anton LaVey
- Lydia Lunch
- Henry Lee Lucas
- Marilyn Manson
- James Mason
- Mark Mothersbaugh
- Adam Parfrey (editor)
- George Petros (editor)
- Raymond Pettibon
- Genesis P-Orridge
- Richard Ramirez
- James Earl Ray
- Boyd Rice
- JG Thirlwell
- Robert Williams
- S. Clay Wilson
- Nick Zedd

== Reception ==
The magazine was known and very controversial for its provocative contents. Art historian Carlo McCormick called it "outrageous, irreverent and infamous", while writer Scott Cunningham criticized what he described as its "neo-fascist winks and nods". Journalist Kevin Coogan wrote that it "used strong psychedelic-like designs, cartoons, totalitarian agit-prop images, photos of Hitler, and John Heartfield-style collages to punch outraged readers in the eye". He described it as "doomed" by its "increasing fascination with fascism" over its existence.

Marcus Greil called it a "sort of pagan-fascist version of RAW". A review in Small Press Review found its oversized pages "only make its on-the-edge contents that much more offensive, like mini-billboards in your face". Petros claimed that Charles Manson wrote him to say he enjoyed the book. Neo-Nazi Tom Metzger said it was full of "very interesting material".

One analysis described it as a "a visual grab-bag of questionable intent giving an indication of what lay ahead." Writer Doug Brod called its illustrations "primitive and often sublime", and Glenn Slater praised it as "provocative and thought-provoking [...] A document of the gradual decline of the 20th century", which in its contents examined the dark aspects of many facets of man.

== Legacy ==
The magazine was hard to acquire in its time and even a few years after the end of its publication issues were sold as collector's items. All issues are available on a website dedicated to the magazine. The sixth, unfinished issue was collected available on the website, and was collected in the Exit anthology.

After leaving Exit, Parfrey went on to found several publishing companies, including Feral House, and edited the 1988 anthology of the transgressive, Apocalypse Culture, which has similar themes and contents to Exit. He immediately succeeded the magazine with another, Blood and Flame. Parfrey later said in 2015 of Exit that with the contents of the magazine, "we had fun with that, but then that could only go so far, so I wanted to do other things." When the magazine shuttered, Petros went on to edit another, more mainstream magazine on music and cultural topics, called Seconds. He also created a collection of his own works, including his works for the magazine, entitled Exploding Hearts, Exploding Stars: The Serial Art and Propagandart of George Petros. It was published by Norman Gosney Publications. Another collection, The Exit Collection, was published in 1998 by Tacit, collecting the 5 published issues and material from the unfinished 6th.

Speaking retrospectively on the magazine, Petros claimed that despite the provocative contents, the magazine was not hateful, saying that: "it wasn’t hateful, scolding, finger-pointing stuff. It was using the currents of dissent and problems in society as materials to create works of art. Of course [it was] for shock value, because we were beyond aesthetics." He also said than in addition to the shocking content, the editors of Exit had tried to "put beauty in there. We didn't hate anybody. We left that to others and respected other people’s hate."
