= Ilya Kormiltsev =

Russian writer (1959–2007)

- Илья Кормильцев
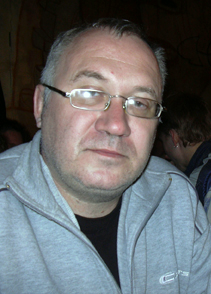
- Born: 26 September 1959; Sverdlovsk, USSR
- Died: 4 February 2007 (aged 47); London, UK
- Education: Ural State University
- Occupations: poet, translator, and publisher
- Writing career
- Language: Russian

Ilya Valeryevich Kormiltsev (Russian: Илья́ Вале́рьевич Корми́льцев; 26 September 1959 – 4 February 2007) was a Russian poet, translator, and publisher. Kormiltsev is most famous for working during the 1980s and the 1990s as a songwriter in Nautilus Pompilius, one of the most popular rock bands in the Soviet Union and, later, Russia. He was also a prominent literary translator and publisher. Since 1997, he translated into Russian many important pieces of modern prose, such as Chuck Palahniuk's Fight Club, or Irvine Welsh's Trainspotting. In 2003, he established Ultra.Kultura publishing house, which immediately gained a scandalous reputation and was closed by the authorities in 2007. Through its brief history, Ultra.Kultura published numerous counter-culture books in a wide range from ultra-right to radical left authors.

== Biography ==
=== Early years ===
Ilya Kormiltsev was born in Sverdlovsk, he had a younger sibling Eugene Kormiltsev. Ilya graduated from an English-focused public school and entered the SPSU, however, after one year he transferred to the Ural State University. In 1981, he graduated from the Chemistry department.

Since 1981, he was a songwriter for Urfin Jus (Russian rock band), musicians Nastya Poleva and Egor Belkin, and several other rock groups. In 1983, Kormiltsev met Vyacheslav Butusov and Dmitry Umetsky from Nautilus Pompilius rock band. Songs, written for them by Kormiltsev, turned the group into the biggest stars of the Russian rock scene, their 1986 album Razluka (rock album) is considered one of the best of its time. In 1989, the band was awarded with the Lenin Komsomol Prize, but Kormiltsev rejected it.

In 1995, Kormiltsev was baptized, he chose Natalya Trauberg to become his god-mother.

Nautilus Pompilius was dissolved by Butusov in 1997, as stated, ‘due to exhaustion’. As recalled by friends and their circle, the breakup was painful for all members, later Kormiltsev never received his part of royalties.

Kormiltsev started looking for new cultural forms and discovered hip-hop. Oleg Sakmarov confessed to be the one who introduced Kormiltsev to drugs. As recalled by Sakmarov, at some point ‘Ilya started dying his hair orange and went high to rave parties’, though before he only drank vodka and watched Italian cinema. With Sakmarov, Kormiltsev created ‘Chuzhie’ (trans. Aliens) trip-hop project. They recorded one album that is still considered to be the best in the history of Russian electro music.

=== Literary career ===
In 1990, Kormiltsev emerged as a literary translator. He was fluent in English and French and translated books from these languages into his native Russian. In 1997, when Nautilus Pompilius broke up, Kormiltsev started working for the Inostrannaya Literatura (Russian magazine). He translated into Russian such writers as J. R. R. Tolkien, J. G. Ballard, Roald Dahl, Irvine Welsh, Gilbert Adair, Frédéric Beigbeder, William S. Burroughs, Richard Brautigan, Chuck Palahniuk, and many others.

In 2000, he tried himself as a publisher and became a manager of the special series of contemporary foreign literature at the Inostranka Publishing House.

In 2003 Kormiltsev founded Ultra.Kultura publishing house and managed it as the editor-in-chief until his death in 2007. The publishing house specialized in controversial and radical texts, one its first books was a novel by a White power skinhead from Moscow Dmitry Nesterov. Its release led to a break up with the Inostranka. Nevertheless, Kormiltsev kept publishing authors from a wide ideological spectrum, from Subcomandante Marcos to William Luther Pierce. Ultra.Kultura was always at the center of public scandals, it was accused for propaganda of drug use, pornography, and terrorism. Meanwhile, Kormiltsev never professed permissiveness, he agreed that such literature required age limits.

In 2006 the combined Ultra.Kultura edition of Adam Parfrey's Apocalypse Culture and Apocalypse Culture II, titled Культура времен Апокалипсиса, was banned by Kremlin decree. Unsold copies were ordered destroyed.

== Death and legacy ==
In late 2006, Kormiltsev and his family went to London. On the very first day in London, Ilya fell down and injured his spine. As his publishing house was closed, Kormiltsev had no income and no medical insurance in England, for several months wasn’t able to go to hospital and refused his wife's pleas to ask for help. Only when he was half-forcibly admitted to hospital by the efforts of his friends, on 22 January 2007, was he diagnosed with incurable spinal cancer. The advanced stage of cancer required expensive therapy, Kormiltsev’s friends managed to contact Roman Abramovich, an old fan of Nautilus Pompilius, who gave 15000 pounds and helped to transfer him into Royal Marsden Hospital. By that time, friends of the family managed to organize Russia-wide crowdfunding and gathered more than 80000 pounds for Ilya. Even in grave condition Kormiltsev refused morphine and kept working, writing poetry and managing issues with Ultra.Kultura. He died on 4 February 2007, aged 47.

The funeral service was held at Troyekurovskoye Cemetery in Moscow. The ceremony was attended by numerous friends, fans and colleagues. Vyacheslav Butusov didn’t come. In 2009, a monument designed by Alexander Korotich was placed on the grave.

Geydar Dzhemal, chairman of the Islamic Committee of Russia, announced that Kormiltsev embraced Islam before his death. Although initially Kormiltsev's friends and relatives denied this had taken place, after the funeral, they announced that Kormiltsev had been buried in a savan, facing Mecca.

A commemorative bench for Kormiltsev was installed at Lincoln's Inn Fields in London, in 2018 the authorities of Ekaterinburg announced naming an alley after him.

In 2007 former staff of Ultra.Kultura and several colleagues announced the establishment of a literary award in honor of Kormiltsev.

In 2016, Kormiltesv's widow Alesya Mankovskaya and his old friend Oleg Sakmarov revived ‘Chuzhie’ project. They recorded several songs with Sakmarov's music and lyrics found in Kormiltesv's computer.
