= Karen Greenlee =

American female necrophile (born 1958)

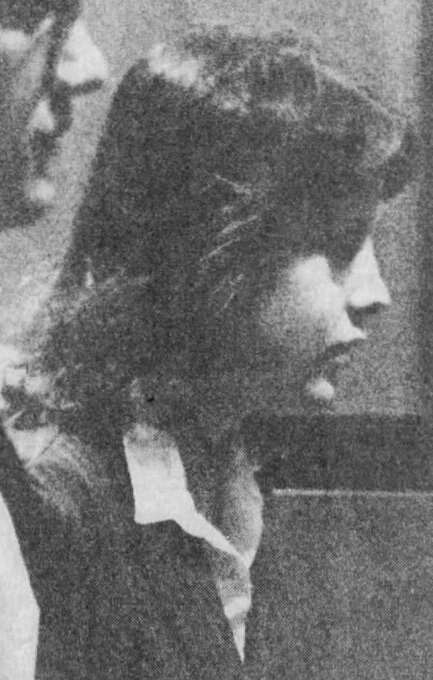
- Greenlee in 1982
- Born: 1958 (age 67–68)
- Occupation: Former apprentice embalmer
- Motive: Necrophilia
- Criminal charges: Theft of a hearse and interfering with a funeral
- Penalty: $255 fine and 11 days in jail

Karen Margaret Greenlee (born 1958) is an American criminal who was convicted of stealing a hearse and having sex with the corpse it contained. She is considered to be the "best-known modern practitioner of necrophilia", and her case was the subject of much research due to her sex as only ten percent of known necrophiles are women, as well as because of the highly detailed interview she gave about her extensive practice of necrophilia in the anthology book Apocalypse Culture.

== Early life ==
Greenlee's father, Al Meyers, said Greenlee had been sexually molested at age 8 and raped by a teacher at 14 while living in Sonoma County, California. Afterwards, Greenlee moved with her family to Colfax, California, where she graduated from high school. Greenlee was married but separated at the time of her arrest. After her arrest, Greenlee worked as a desk-clerk receptionist at a motel in the southwestern United States, but was unemployed at the time of her trial.

== Arrest ==
Greenlee worked as an apprentice embalmer at the Memorial Lawn Mortuary in Sacramento, California. On December 17, 1979, she stole the 1975 Cadillac hearse she was driving to a private burial along with the body of a 33-year-old man (who had died a week before) it was carrying. According to Lynne Stopkewich, who directed Kissed, a film based on Greenlee's story, she was driving the hearse to the funeral as intended until she saw the departed's family, then "did a big donut and took off". She was found days later near Alleghany in Sierra County. According to Robert Rocheleau, the physician who pumped Greenlee's stomach, she was "extremely depressed" and had attempted to commit suicide by overdosing on about 20 pills of Tylenol and codeine but survived. She was found with a four-and-a-half page long written confession where she admitted having had sex with 20 to 40 other bodies of young men, calling it "an addiction".

Because necrophilia was not illegal in California at the time, Greenlee was only accused of stealing the hearse and interfering with a funeral, for which she pleaded guilty and was sentenced to pay a $255 fine and spend 11 days in jail. After her release, her probation included mandatory therapy, which she says helped her make peace with herself. Greenlee and Memorial Lawn Mortuary were sued for $1 million by Marian Gonzales, mother of victim John L. Mercure, for "severe emotional distress". At the Superior Court hearing, the defense psychiatrist Captane Thomson said he did not think the event had "much of a lasting impact" on the victim's mother, who he said had a history of alcoholism and depression. Richard A. Kapuschinsky, a fellow embalmer and former colleague of Greenlee, testified to the jury that "there was no reason to suspect" Greenlee would commit such a crime, describing her as quiet and competent. The lawsuit was eventually settled for $117,000 in general and punitive damages.

== Interview ==
A drawing by Greenlee illustrating her perspective on necrophilia

A few years later in 1987, Greenlee gave a detailed interview entitled The Unrepentant Necrophile about her necrophiliac interests to Jim Morton for Adam Parfrey's book Apocalypse Culture, published by Feral House. In it, she stated that "[o]ne of my brothers ... still isn't comfortable around me. My other brother was more supportive, but even he had to ask How'd you do it?" She described her appreciation of "the cold, the aura of death, the smell of death, the funereal surroundings" associated with her activity. She further discussed topics such as suicide and psychotherapy. Greenlee later reportedly regretted the interview, changed her identity, and moved to another city.

== Cultural impact ==
Greenlee's story inspired Barbara Gowdy's 1992 short story "We So Seldom Look On Love", which in turn inspired the 1996 Canadian independent film Kissed, directed by Lynne Stopkewich. Like Greenlee, the movie's main character was a young woman working as an embalmer fascinated with dead bodies and who engages in necrophilia. Molly Parker's portrayal of the controversial role earned her an award for "Performance by an Actress in a Leading Role" at the 18th Genie Awards. As of 1996, Greenlee was reported to be touring North America with her poetry, conferencing about necrophilia and sexual liberation.

According to Esoterra, a leading extreme culture and horror magazine of the 90s, Sally Jessy Raphael taped an interview with Greenlee but refused to air it because Greenlee refused to show repentance for her actions. Greenlee described herself as a "morgue rat" and considered necrophilia an addiction.

Greenlee contributed a chapter to The Gospel of Filth, a book detailing the history and occult influences of extreme metal band Cradle of Filth. Greenlee's story was also the inspiration for a "raucous rock musical", entitled The Unrepentant Necrophile and created by The Coldharts, presented at festivals like the fourth edition of the Twin Cities Horror Festival, as well as the 2017 Orlando Fringe Festival.
