= George Petros =

American artist (born 1955)

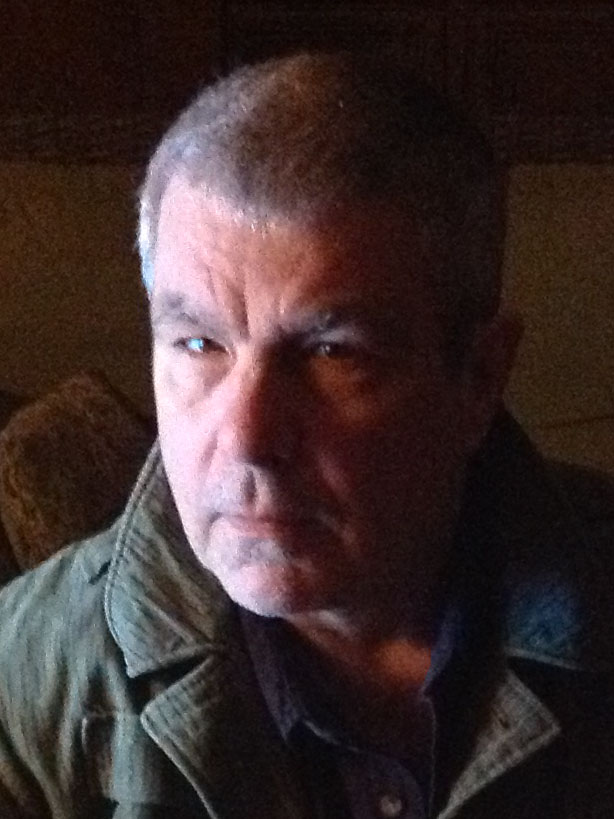
- Petros at home in Brooklyn, May 2016. Photo by Robert Lund
- Born: George Lawrence Petros; January 11, 1955 (age 71); Chicago, Illinois, U.S.
- Occupations: Art designer, author, editor, interviewer, illustrator
- Years active: 1984–present
- Website: georgepetros.com

George Lawrence Petros (born 11 January 1955) is an American art designer, author, editor, and illustrator. He is the author of several books, and has edited several magazines. From 1984 through 1992 he published and edited Exit, a punk-inspired art and science fiction magazine he founded with Adam Parfrey. From 1992 through 2000 he edited and art-directed Seconds, an all-interview music and culture magazine founded by Steven Blush, and was later an editor for the magazines Juxtapoz and Propaganda.

== Early life ==
George Lawrence Petros was born in Chicago, Illinois, on January 11, 1955. His family later moved to Clearwater, Florida; as an adult, he returned to Chicago, attending the Illinois Institute of Art – Chicago.

== Career ==
Petros did the cover art for the new wave band Devo's 1981 compilation album, E-Z Listening Disc, as well as the interior art. In 1984, Petros and Adam Parfrey launched Exit, a, New York City-based large-format alternative comic art magazine focused on science fiction and graphics. It was known for its outrageous and offensive content. Petros and Parfrey later had a falling out and Parfrey quit the magazine, calling Petros a "prima donna". Petros continued editing the magazine. Five issues of Exit were released in total; a sixth was partially completed.

Petros released Exploding Hearts Exploding Stars, a collection of his art for Exit, in 1992. Another collection of Exit by Petros, The Exit Collection, was published in 1998 by Tacit, collecting the 5 published issues and material from the unfinished 6th.

While working on Exit, Petros became the co-editor of Seconds, a New York City-based music and culture magazine founded by Steven Blush. Petros began writing for Seconds in 1990, writing for it until its end in 2000. He was later a contributing editor for the art magazine Juxtapoz, and the senior editor of Propaganda, a goth magazine.

Petros was a contributor to the collection of the transgressive, Apocalypse Culture II, edited by Adam Parfrey and published by Feral House in 2000. He edited and designed for Steven Blush's 2001 book on the history of the punk movement, American Hardcore: A Tribal History. He later co-edited a collection of Seconds interviews with Blush, .45 Dangerous Minds, published in 2005 by Creation Books. In 2007, he authored Art That Kills: A Panoramic Portrait of Aesthetic Terrorism 1984-2001, a collection of materials related to "aesthetic terrorism", what the book describes as "[u]sing the element of surprise through the usage of past clichés, knowledge and 'home truths' being flung out of joint, and therefore used as a weapon or subversive force", focusing on the nihilistic, the satanic, and transgressive.

== Publications ==
- —— (1992). Exploding Hearts Exploding Stars: The Serial Art and Propagandart of George Petros. Norman Gosney Publications. ISBN 1-881875-00-8.
- —— (1998). The Exit Collection. Chicago: Tacit. ISBN 0-9661340-0-1.
- Blush, Steven (2001). —— (ed.). American Hardcore: A Tribal History. Los Angeles: Feral House. ISBN 0-922915-71-7.
  - Blush, Steven (2010). Petros, George (ed.). American Hardcore: A Tribal History (2nd ed.). Port Townsend: Feral House. ISBN 978-1-932595-89-5.
- Blush, Steven; ——, eds. (2005). .45 Dangerous Minds: The Most Intense Interviews From Seconds Magazine. London: Creation Books. ISBN 1-84068-124-1.
- —— (2007). Art That Kills: A Panoramic Portrait of Aesthetic Terrorism 1984-2001. London: Creation Books. ISBN 1-84068-143-8.
- —— (2012). The New Transsexuals: The Next Step In Human Evolution. PetrosIdeas. ISBN 978-0-9855018-0-8.

== Musical compilations ==
- Black Sunshine: The Tampa Underground and Beyond compiled and produced by George Petros (Cleopatra Records, 2003)
- New York City Rock N Roll compiled and produced by Steven Blush; project coordinator etc.: George Petros (Radical Records, 2004)
- Easy Listening Acid Trip compiled by George Petros, 1987-2007
