= Ultra.Kultura =

Russian counterculture publisher

- Founded: 2003
- Founder: Ilya Kormiltsev
- Country of origin: Russia
- Official website: Official website

Ultra.Kultura (Russian: Ультра.Культура) was a Russian counterculture book publisher.

== History ==
In 2003, Ilya Kormiltsev founded publishing house Ultra.Kultura and managed it as the editor-in-chief since 2003 until his death in 2007. Ultra.Kultura became notorious in 2004, when Russian authorities accused it with propaganda of drug use and terrorism.

In 2006, shortly after Ultra.Kultura translated Adam Parfrey's Apocalypse Culture and Apocalypse Culture II and published them together as a single volume, titled Культура времен Апокалипсиса, the volume was banned by Kremlin decree as drug propaganda. Unsold copies were ordered destroyed.

== Series ==
- overdrive - "radical" fiction
- russkiy drive - books of young Russian authors
- non-fiction - books dealing with acute social issues (terrorism, drugs)
- cybertime - books about information technology
- ЖZЛ - books about leading figures of the counterculture
- Klassenkampf - opinion journalism
- ultra.fiction - fiction books

== Authors ==
Ultra.Kultura was known for publishing "controversial" authors and books related to far-left and far-right extremism. Ultra.Kultura published essays of National Bolshevik Party leader Eduard Limonov when he was imprisoned.

Other notable authors include :

- Blanche Barton
- Melvin Burgess
- William S. Burroughs
- Nick Cave
- Geydar Dzhemal
- Bret Easton Ellis
- Susan George
- William Gibson
- Che Guevara
- Boris Kagarlitsky
- Lydia Lunch
- Huey P. Newton
- Howard Marks
- Hubert Selby, Jr.
- Adam Parfrey
- William Luther Pierce
- Abel Posse
- Alexander Prokhanov
- Israel Shamir
- Gene Sharp
- Subcomandante Marcos
- Alexander Tarasov

== See also ==
- Freedom of the press in Russia
