= Apocalypse Culture II =

2000 anthology edited by Adam Parfrey

- Cover of the first edition
- Editor: Adam Parfrey
- Cover artist: Joe Coleman
- Language: English
- Subject: Fringe literature
- Publisher: Feral House
- Publication date: 2000
- Media type: Print
- Pages: 468
- ISBN: 0-922915-57-1
- OCLC: 44950340
- Preceded by: Apocalypse Culture

Apocalypse Culture II is an anthology of the fringe and transgressive edited by Adam Parfrey and published by Feral House in 2000. A sequel to his previous work, Apocalypse Culture, it continues the probing of societal taboos, with special attention given to conspiracy theories, neo-Nazism, child pornography, cannibalism, terrorism, assorted paraphilia, scatological research, racisms, misanthropic ecology, and mind control.

Entries included are authored by, among others, John Hinckley Jr., Michael Moynihan, Crispin Glover, and Peter Sotos. The book's final entry is an essay by the Unabomber, Ted Kaczynski. The book was published in a combined edition with its predecessor in Russia in 2006, where it was banned as "drug propaganda" due to the entry on ketamine. Several reviewers found the volume disturbing, but complimented it for what it was.

== Background and publication history ==
Apocalypse Culture II was edited by Adam Parfrey, the sequel to the 1987 anthology volume Apocalypse Culture. Parfey's works often focused on the bizarre. It covers similar topics and ground to the first volume. The book was first published in 2000 by Feral House, Parfrey's publishing house. The first edition was 468 pages long. Talking to Willamette Week, Parfrey said of the book that:

It seems like an awful lot of people grow goatees and talk about hip things. But with this book, if you think it's all hip and kind and wonderful and groovy—well, there are some things in this book that are not very groovy at all. You have to look at it and figure out, what does free speech mean? What do these terrible things mean? We live in a world where some not very hip things are happening, and this book tries to get at some of them.

While promoting the book and asked on his feelings on it by the Los Angeles Times, he said: "Upsetting people is a beautiful thing." Parfrey had problems finding a printer for the book due to some of the illustrations in the pedophilia sections. He found a printer that would take on the job, but only if six images were removed. Parfrey agreed, and instead put the six removed images on his website.

In 2006, the book and the original Apocalypse Culture were translated into Russian in 2006 and published combined as one volume by the Russian counterculture publisher Ultra.Kultura as Культура времен Апокалипсиса. The book was afterwards banned in Russia as "drug propaganda" due to David Woodard's entry on ketamine. All copies were confiscated.

== Contents ==
Parfrey clarifies, in the preface, that the collection is not a "manifesto or a smorgasbord of personal fetishes or beliefs", but that "the book was compiled to examine far-reaching and extreme societal tendrils." It is dedicated to "the memory of Vladimir Jabotinsky 1880-1940." It opens with quotations from Wilhelm Stekel's Sadism and Masochism and Woodrow Parfrey's (the editor's father) death scene as a mass murderer in the Naked City episode, "Burst of Passion".

It continues the probing of societal taboos, with topics ranging from child pornography, neo-Nazism, Nazism, cannibalism, terrorism, assorted paraphilia, scatological research, racisms, misanthropic ecology, and mind control. Other topics include Jews for Hitler, conspiracy theories and satanic ritual abuse. The book is illustrated. Authors included are John Hinckley Jr., Michael Moynihan, actor Crispin Glover, and Peter Sotos, among others. The book concludes with an essay by the Unabomber, Ted Kaczynski.

Chapter list
Title	Author	Subjects/Details
"Clonejesus.com"	Kristan Lawson	Excerpts from a website written to advocate cloning Jesus from his DNA preserved on holy relics.
"Human Pigs"	Robert Knight, Robert Kimbrell, Michio Kaku	AIDS
"The Strange Crime of Issei Sagawa"	Colin Wilson	Cannibalism and Issei Sagawa
"Bottom Feeder"	Life Dynamics Inc.	Anti-abortion comic pamphlet
"From Cradle to Ladle"	Georges LaMort	Recipes for preparing children, infants, and fetuses
"For Fear of Little Men"	Steven Speer	Homunculi
"The Son of a New Morality Which Drowned Many in Her Wake"	Michael Moynihan and Marco Deplano	Giusva Fioravanti, founder of the Nuclei Armati Rivoluzionari
"Bacteriological Warfare"	Larry Wayne Harris	Biological warfare
The Conspiracy Virus, and How Mass Media "Tries to Prevent It"	Jonathan Vankin	"Conspiracy theory"
"Techniques for Truth Suppression"	David Martin	
"The Scapegoat: Ted Kaczynski, Ritual Murder, and The Invocation of Catastrophe"	Michael A. Hoffman II	The cryptocracy's framing of Ted Kaczynski
"America, The Possessed Corpse"	James Shelby Downard	
"The Jonestown Re-enactment"	Rod Dickinson	Jonestown
"Murder Lite"	Sondra London	Serial murder
"Joe alt.true.crime"	Adam Parfrey, JOE	FAQ about murder lover JOE, his postings on the true crime newsgroup, plus his letter to Danny Rolling
"Danny Rolling's Letter"	Danny Rolling	Serial killer
"I Am The Hate"	Rosemary Malign	Hateful poem
"Roadkill"	Jim Goad	Firsthand account of the author's assault of his girlfriend
"Hatred and Anger"	Charles Darwin	From The Expression of the Emotions in Man and Animals
"Dear Satan,"		Letters sent to Anton LaVey and the Church of Satan
"The Pornography of Romance"	Adam Parfrey	Friscon Slash Convention
"John Hinckley's Letters and Poems"	John Hinckley	John Hinckley's letters to Jodie Foster
"Uncle Ronnie's Sex Slaves"	Robert Sterling	Cathy O'Brien, Brice Taylor, Sexual slavery, mind control
"Ritual Abuse"		List of symptoms and syndromes regarding Satanic ritual abuse
"Ceto's New Friends"	Leah A Haley	Pro-alien abduction children's book
"The Private Zone"	Frances S. Dayee	Excerpts from a 1982 child sexual assault prevention book
"Pedophilia and the Morally Righteous"	Chris Campion	Thomas Hamilton
"Prime Time"	Peter Sotos	JonBenét Ramsey
"The Child Pornography Prevention Act of 1995"		Orrin Hatch, Dianne Feinstein
"The Late, Great Aesthetic Taboos"	Ghazi Barakat	Censorship, NAMBLA, Stu Mead, Trevor Brown, Beth Love, Blalla W. Hallman,
"The Color Section"		The poster for Crispin Hellion Glover's What Is It?, paintings by Blalla W. Hallman, Stu Mead, Danny Rolling, and Norbert Cox
"Inaugurator of the Pleasure Dome: Bobby Beausoleil"	Michael Moynihan	Bobby Beausoleil, Charles Manson, Aleister Crowley, Arthur Lee, David LaFlamme, Lucifer, Kenneth Anger, biker gangs. Prison rape
"My Lips Pressed Against the Decay"	Chad Hensley	Necrophilia, Leilah Wendell
"The Ketamine Necromance"	David Woodard	Woodard describes his experience on ketamine as a child after a traumatic accident, which he recounts as a near-death experience. He says he believes ketamine is how the dead communicate with the living.
"RealDoll"	Adam Parfrey	
"Who Is the Most Masterful Seducer of Them All?"	Adam Parfrey	Seduction, Neuro-linguistic programming
"Steps In Overcoming Masturbation"	Mark E. Petersen	Masturbation
"The New Hermaphrodite"	George Petros	Hermaphroditism
"Total Body Transplants"	John McKenzie	
"Death By Installments"	Peter Cochrane	
"The Syrup of Memory"	Jeffery Lewis	
"Hi-Tech Market Research"	Dan Kelly	Neil Postman, Advertising
"Project Blue Beam: The Electronic Second Coming"	Wes Thomas	UFOs, Area 51, Strategic Defense Initiative
"Bye Bye Miss American Pie As Sung By Aryan Nations"	Roy Taylor	A member of the Church of Jesus Christ–Christian analyzes the song "American Pie" through a Nazi lens.
"Holding Onto Jesus' Feet"	David Sereda	
"Jesus/Lucifer Santa/Satan? The Apocalyptic Parables Of Norbert H. Kox"	Adam Parfrey	Norbert H. Kox, Nubian Hebrews
"The Bleeder"	Adam Parfrey, Giorgio Bongiovanni	Stigmata
"David and Hitler go to the planet Mars"	David	Semi-Retardation
"What Is It?"	Crispin Hellion Glover	Glover debates the pros and cons of murdering Steven Spielberg.
"Never Again!"	Irv Rubin	Antisemitism, Buford Furrow, Jewish Defense League
"Jews For Hitler"	Adam Parfrey	Richard Green, Magen David, Swastika, Tom Metzger, Bryan Rigg
"Were Whites Made by Yacub through Selective Breeding?"	Dr. S. Epps	Yakub (Nation of Islam)
"The War of the Balls excerpted from The Isis Papers"	Dr. Frances Cress Welsing	Bowling, Golf, Race war
"Kill and Kill Again"		Ice Cube, Christian Identity, Cheo Choker, Khalid Abdul Muhammed, Lauren Greenfield
"Brown Magic"	Kadmon	
"The Fecal Sorcerer"	Michael Moynihan	Alchemy
"Edible Reward for Dry Pants"	Richard M. Foxx and Nathan H. Azrin	Applied Behavior Analysis
"The S*** List"	Jack's Number Two	
"Dystopia"	Boyd Rice	
"Mr. Awesome Proves Everybody Is A Star"	Adam Parfrey	Roy Shildt
"The Vampire Manifesto"	Nicolas Claux	Vampirism
"Humanflood"	Pentti Linkola / Introduction by Michael Moynihan	
"Ship of Fools"	Ted Kaczynski	

== Reception ==
Given its subject matter, several reviewers found it disturbing or recommended against it for the easily disturbed. A review from The Austin Chronicle called it a "roundup of sociopathology for the new millennium". They called most of its entries brutal, but others "frankly hilarious", though "all of it is to be taken with a grain of salt". Mike Tribby recommended it for "those interested, healthily or not, in the dark and scary limits of the human imagination. Scholar Jeffrey Kaplan wrote in a review that "no better guide to these nether regions can be offered than Parfrey's Apocalypse Culture II", though given its content said it was "not to every reader’s taste — the squeamish and the censorious are advised to give this book as well as its illustrious predecessors a wide berth". Writer Spencer Sunshine wrote of its contents that, much like other Parfrey collections, the book contained "politically unproblematic articles. Alongside them were essays by Hoffman, Moynihan, and Rice; the misanthropic racist Pentti Linkola; and pieces from Aryan Nations and the gay neo-Nazi group National Socialist League". Zach Dundas of Willamette Week said it "cuts with a nastier knife" than the prior book with "enough dark matter to permanently alter the curvature of your mind". New York Press wrote that it "suggests that the world has only gotten darker and crazier in the decade-plus since the original volume".

Writing for Wired, Charles Paul Freund compared Parfrey to other cataloguers of the weird, saying that in comparison, "Parfrey and his assembled authors let freaks speak for themselves. The result not only challenges many readers' points of reference, but suggests that, in one way or another, everybody may be some sort of freak." He complimented Moynihan's piece on Bobby Beausoleil and the pieces on "truth suppression" and the fear of small people, but criticized Parfrey's "Jews for Hitler" essay as incorrect in places. Mark Dery for The Village Voice called it far better than its predecessor. Dery wrote that it was "a better book in almost every way", saying it was beter edited, had a better scope, and was better illustrated than Apocalypse Culture I; however, he said that this came at a time when America was much weirder, which lessened the book's impact. Kaplan said it came in contradiction to "all those who still entertain the hope that the millennium would bring, if not the much sought global harmonic convergence, at least some sign that the human race has grown not only older but wiser with time". Freund was unsure of the effect of the book, writing that he was unsure if it meant "Edgelessness? Or is the human borderland an infinite space with uncounted cultures and uncountable apocalypses?"
