= Twilight language (disambiguation) =

Twilight language is a polysemic language and communication system associated with Tantric traditions.

Twilight language may also refer to:

- The Twilight Language: Explorations in Buddhist Meditation and Symbolism, a 1986 book by Roderick Bucknell and Martin Stuart-Fox
- A conspiracy theory proposed by James Shelby Downard
