= Jim Morton (American writer) =

San Francisco-based film and pop culture writer

- Citizenship: United States
- Occupation: Writer
- Writing career
- Language: English
- Years active: 1983–present
- Subjects: B-movies, Grindhouse, Exploitation films, East-German cinema
- Notable work: Incredibly Strange Films
- Website: jimmortonwriter.com

Jim Morton is an American writer based in San Francisco, California, known for his writings on American B-movies, grindhouse, exploitation films, and East German cinema.

== Biography ==
In the early-1980s, Morton self-published a 'zine about B-movies called Trashola. Following Trashola, Morton co-authored and guest-edited the 1985 RE/Search Publications book Incredibly Strange Films.

Morton interviewed necrophile Karen Greenlee for Adam Parfrey's 1987 collection Apocalypse Culture. Greenlee later reportedly regretted the interview, changed her identity, and relocated. A year later, Morton co-edited the 1988 collection on obscure and bygone pop culture, Pop Void: A Journal of Popular Culture.

In the 1990s and early 2000s, Morton contributed essays to several American and British film books, including Lost Highways: An Illustrated History of Road Movies, Sex and Zen and a Bullet in the Head: The Essential Guide to Hong Kong's Mind-bending Films , and Land of a Thousand Balconies: Discoveries and Confessions of a B-Movie Archaeologist. Morton also co-authored a 1996 book about American advertising, titled What a Character!: 20th Century American Advertising Icons.

Morton speaks German, and has authored a survey of East-German cinema titled Movies Behind the Wall: The Story of East German Films and the Rise and Fall of the GDR. He also maintains the East German Cinema Blog. Morton translated Frank Wedekind’s German novella Mine Ha-ha into English.

Morton has taught film classes for the San Francisco Free University. He presented at San Francisco's Oddball Films' "Cinema Soiree Series," and was the guest speaker at the 2010 Revelation Film Festival in Perth, Australia. In 2019 he was interviewed for a documentary film about Church of Satan founder Anton LaVey.

Morton has also written for Film-to-Film and The Film Noir Foundation, as well as for non-film-related publications such as Macworld, and Mother Jones. Morton's most recent book is a work of neo-noir fiction titled The Lying Ghost. As of March 2026, he has begun posting film-related articles on Substack, under the title Pop Void at the Movies.

== Bibliography ==
- Morton, Jim (2025). The Lying Ghost. ISBN 979-8262596744.
- Morton, Jim (2021). Creature with the Atom Brain. ISBN 979-8757777238.
- Morton, Jim (2020). Movies Behind the Wall: The Story of East German Films and the Rise and Fall of the GDR. ISBN 979-8581960769.
- Morton, Jim (1996). What a Character! 20th Century American Advertising Icons. ISBN 978-0811809368.
- Morton, Jim (1988). Pop Void: A Journal of Popular Culture. ISBN 978-0942931044.
- Morton, Jim (1985). Incredibly Strange Films. ISBN 978-1889307114.
