= James Shelby Downard =

American conspiracy theorist (1913–1998)

James Shelby Downard (March 13, 1913 – March 16, 1998) was an American conspiracy theorist. His works focus on analyzing perceived occult symbolism, twilight language, and synchronicity in relation to historical events of the 20th century. Downard gained recognition for his contribution to Masonic conspiracy theories; specifically his belief that the Freemasons orchestrated the assassination of President John F. Kennedy through a ritual referred to as "Killing of the King".

== Biography ==
Vankin and Whalen write of Downard:

Some conspiracy theorists question not "the facts" so much as reason itself. James Shelby Downard is one of those mad geniuses with a talent for making the most improbable, impossible, ludicrous and laughable speculations appear almost plausible. A self-described student of the "science of symbolism", Downard peels away the rational veneer of history and exposes an abyss of logic-defying synchronicities.

Downard is known for his essay “King-Kill/33: Masonic Symbolism in the Assassination of John F. Kennedy," originally published by Adam Parfrey. In the first edition of the book, Apocalypse Culture, he speculates that the Freemasons were responsible for the assassination of President John F. Kennedy. The essay was removed from the second edition of the book and replaced by another essay by Downard, "The Call to Chaos." Apocalypse Culture II contains another Downard essay, "America, The Possessed Corpse." Jim Keith, editor of yet another Feral House publication, Secret and Suppressed: Banned Ideas and Hidden History, included "Sorcery, Sex, Assassination," the original article of which King Kill/33 is an abridgment.

Included in Cult Rapture is "Riding the Downardian Nightmare," a piece written by Parfrey concerning a visit to Downard in Memphis, Tennessee.

== Writing ==
- "King-Kill/33°," in Apocalypse Culture (1st ed.), ed. Adam Parfrey (Amok, 1987).
- "Call to Chaos," in Apocalypse Culture (2nd ed.), ed. Adam Parfrey (Feral House, 1990).
- "Sorcery, Sex, Assassination and the Science of Symbolism," in Secret and Suppressed: Banned Ideas and Hidden History, ed. Jim Keith (Feral House, 1993).
- "America, The Possessed Corpse," in Apocalypse Culture II, ed. Adam Parfrey (Feral House, 2000).
- The Carnivals of Life and Death: My Profane Life, 1913–1935 (Feral House, 2006).
- Stalking the Great Whore: The Lost Writings of James Shelby Downard, ed. Adam Gorightly (Gorightly Publications, 2023).

== Sources ==
- Brandon, Jim. Dunlap, Ill. The Rebirth of Pan: Hidden Faces of the American Earth Spirit, Firebird Press, 1983.
- Downard, James Shelby, The Carnivals of Life and Death, Feral House, September 2006.
- "Sorcery, Sex, Assassination", in Keith, Jim ed. Secret and Suppressed. Portland, Or.: Feral House, 1993.
- "America, The Possessed Corpse", in Parfrey, Adam ed. Apocalypse Culture II. Venice, Calif.: Feral House, 2000.
- "Riding the Downardian Nightmare", in Parfrey, Adam. Cult Rapture. Portland, Or.: Feral House, 1994.
