= Incredibly Strange Films =

Book about American underground and other films

- Author: V. Vale and Andrea Juno (editors)
- Language: English
- Subject: Underground film
- Publisher: RE/Search
- Publication date: 1986
- Publication place: United States
- Media type: Print
- Pages: 224
- ISBN: 0-940642-09-3
- OCLC: 15028348
- Dewey Decimal: 791.43/75/0973 20
- LC Class: PN1997.8 .I54 1986

RE/Search No. 10: Incredibly Strange Films is a book about American underground and other films. It was guest edited by Jim Morton, with associate editor Boyd Rice, in the RE/Search series edited by V. Vale and Andrea Juno, originally published in 1985 and expanded in 1986.

Among the subjects covered are the work of filmmakers Russ Meyer, Herschell Gordon Lewis, Kenneth Anger, Frank Henenlotter, Larry Cohen, Andy Milligan, Doris Wishman, David F. Friedman, Ed Wood, Radley Metzger, Joseph W. Sarno, Ray Dennis Steckler, Ted V. Mikels, Dick Bakalyan, and genres such as women in prison film, mondo films, exploitation films, beach party films, Santo films, educational films, LSD films, juvenile delinquent films, biker films, and sexploitation films. It includes essays on Young Playthings, Wizard of Gore, God Told Me To, Blast of Silence, Daughter of Horror, Spider Baby, and George A. Romero.

The book was published in the US by RE/Search Publications and in Britain by Plexus (now an imprint of Information Today).

== Primary sources ==
- RE/Search No. 10: Incredibly Strange Films. San Francisco: RE/Search Publications, 1986. ISBN 0-940642-09-3.
- Incredibly Strange Films. London: Plexus, n.d. ISBN 0-85965-161-4.
