= David Woodard =

American conductor and writer (born 1964)

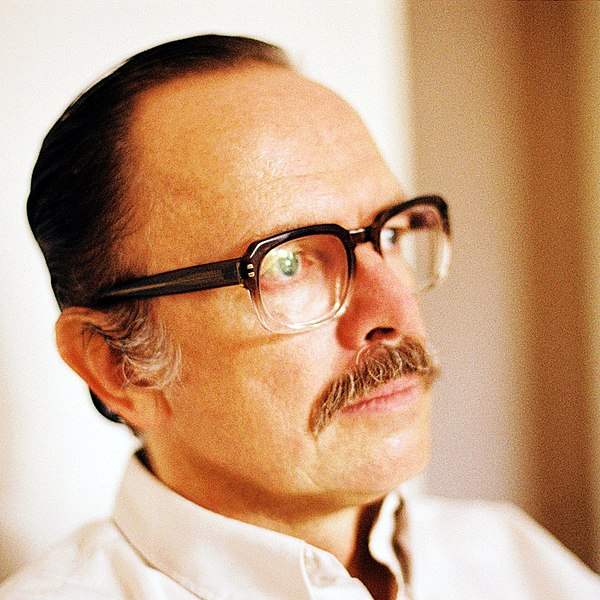
- Woodard in 2020
- Born: 1964 (age 61–62); Santa Barbara, California, U.S.
- Education: San Francisco Conservatory of Music
- Occupation: Artist

David James Woodard (/ˈwʊdɑːrd/; born 1964) is an American artist known for his controversial performances. Through the 1990s and 2000s, Woodard constructed and sold stroboscopic light devices known as Dreamachines. He created memorial compositions for people such as baseball player Joe DiMaggio, terrorist Timothy McVeigh, and neo-Nazi activist William Luther Pierce. He also attempted to memorialize the hijackers responsible for the September 11 attacks.

== Early life ==
Woodard was born in Santa Barbara, California, in 1964. His mother was Virginia Woodard. According to her, Woodard's father was a disc jockey and later worked in public relations. He claimed his mother was an anesthesiologist; when contacted by a journalist, she denied this. Woodard claimed in 2001 that his interest in death stemmed from the fact that, when he was a teenager, his girlfriend was mysteriously found dead; in another instance he said that she had killed herself and her parents had blamed him.

A piece by the OC Weekly in 2000 accused Woodard of fabricating or exaggerating many aspects of his life and having a strong desire to be famous. Woodard studied at the San Francisco Conservatory of Music, before he moved to Napa, California in 1987. There he worked at the Tulocay Cemetery.

In 2000, he contributed a chapter to Adam Parfrey's anthology book on the transgressive, Apocalypse Culture II, in which he wrote about ketamine usage in a chapter called "The Ketamine Necromance". Due to the chapter, the book was removed from circulation in Russia as "drug propaganda". Copies of the book were destroyed and the printer who produced them was fined.

== Dreamachine ==
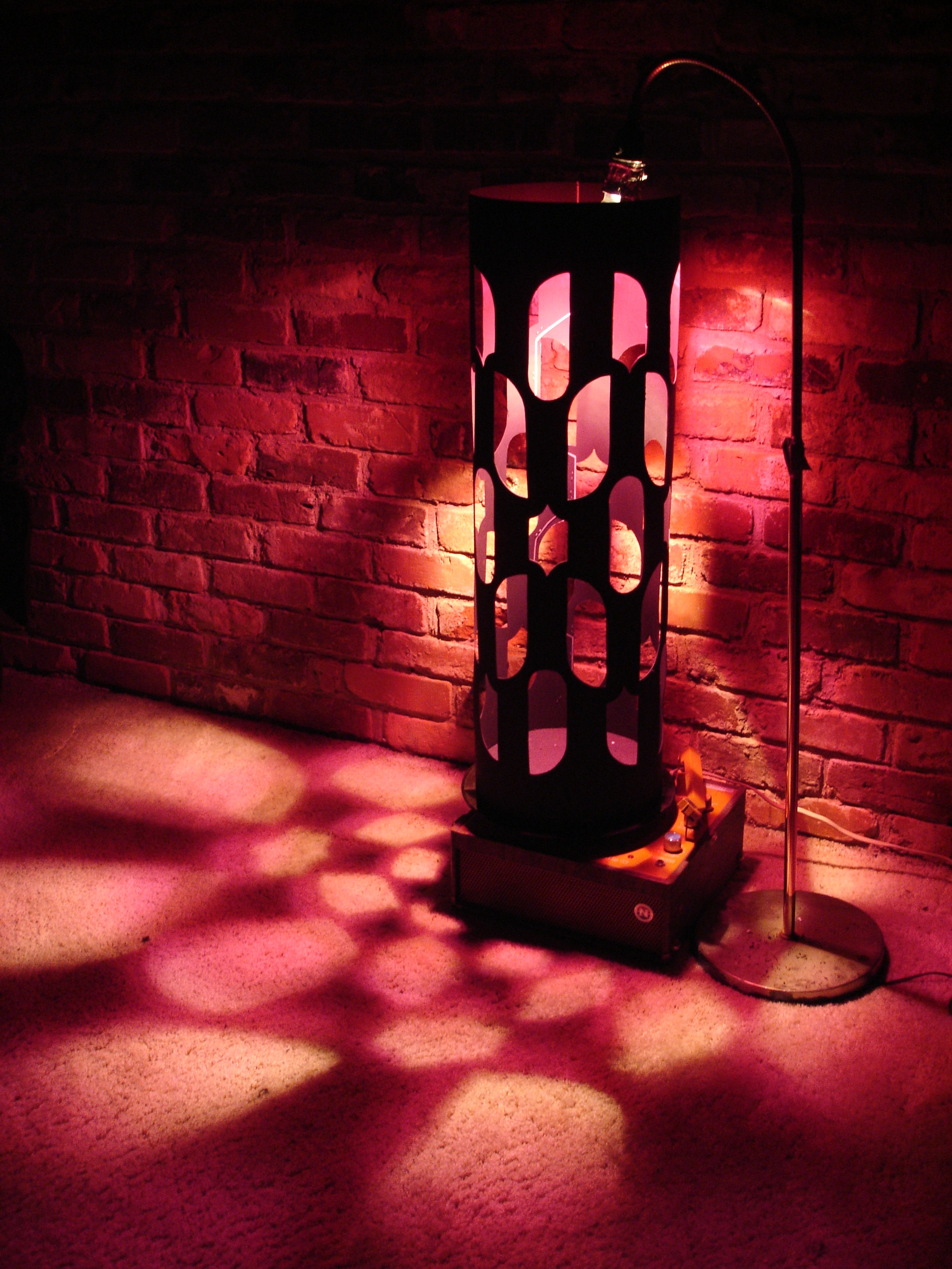
An example of a Dreamachine

While in Napa, he became interested in the Dreamachine, a stroboscopic light art device invented by Brion Gysin and Ian Sommerville. He first read about it in William S. Burroughs' The Job and Gysin's The Process. His landlord had been a friend of Gysin and was in possession of the schematics used to build the device. Based on those schematics Woodard built replicas of the device, selling them through word of mouth.

Woodard befriended Burroughs, who had previously also built Dreamachines, and moved to Lawrence, Kansas in 1997 to be closer to him. He later moved to Los Angeles. One of Woodard's Dreamachine replicas was shown in William S. Burroughs' 1996 LACMA visual retrospective Ports of Entry, and William Burroughs: 100 Years of Expanding Consciousness at the Spencer Museum of Art in Lawrence, Kansas in 2014. A dreamachine was sold to Kurt Cobain, possibly by Woodard, which some organizations claimed was responsible for his suicide, criticizing both Burroughs and Woodard for this. Later reports on Cobain's suicide contradicted this claim. In 2004, a journalist ordered a $500 Dreamachine from Woodard, which was delivered after seven months of delays, and was made from black cardboard.

Woodard also constructed and offered for sale a device he referred to as a "wishing machine", inspired by Burroughs' writings, which he claimed had allowed him to control the weather and cure cancer.

== Memorial pieces ==
During the 1990s, Woodard coined the term prequiem, a portmanteau of the words preemptive and requiem, to describe his practice of composing dedicated music "for the soon-to-be-deceased". In the 1990s, he wrote a prequiem entitled "Farewell From Humankind" to a brown pelican who was killed by a beach comber. Woodard sought out media coverage for the pelican prequiem. He composed another for baseball player Joe DiMaggio called "Farewell to the Yankee Clipper", but was not allowed to perform it in front of DiMaggio, despite his efforts.

Woodard got in contact with Timothy McVeigh, the perpetrator of the Oklahoma City bombing which killed 168 people in 1995, to conduct a prequiem Mass on the eve of his 2001 execution in Terre Haute, Indiana. According to Woodard, the composition was originally intended to be for "Dr. Death" Jack Kevorkian in case he died during a prison hunger strike. It was originally intended to be called "Farewell to a Saint", but he changed this to "Ave Atque Vale" (Hail and Farewell) due to potential offensiveness. During their contact, McVeigh wrote approvingly of Woodard. Woodard originally intended to perform it at the prison, but prison officials denied this. The plan received criticism, including from a survivor of the bombing, for being insensitive. OC Weekly described the plan as itself an artpiece, given the resulting outrage had given him more attention than the music. Woodard premiered the coda section of his composition with a local brass choir at St. Margaret Mary Church, near USP Terre Haute.

Woodard performed other memorial pieces for infamous deaths during this period, including an 8-year old crushed by a park bench and a 90-year old killed in a funicular crash. Following the September 11 attacks, he attempted unsuccessfully to stage a memorial to the 9/11 hijackers. In 2002, he wrote a "memorial suite" for neo-Nazi William Luther Pierce in 2002, following Pierce's unexpected death.

== Nueva Germania ==
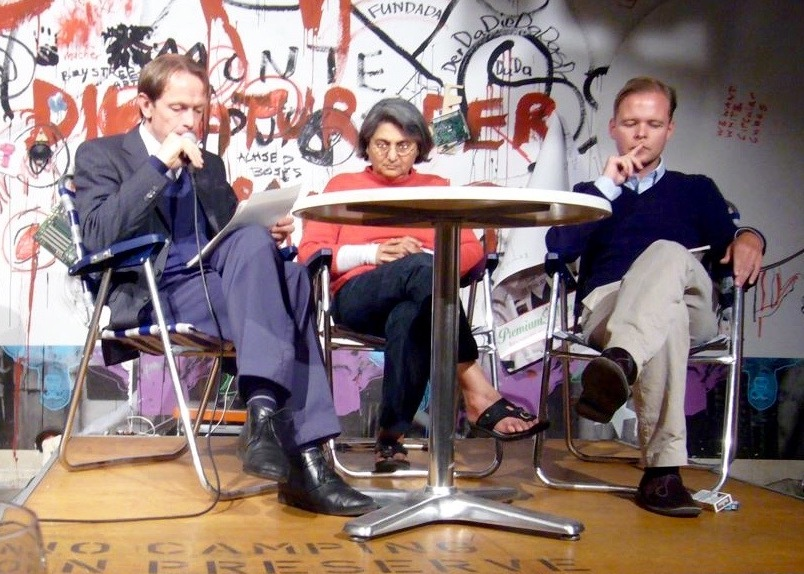
Woodard (left) with Ma Anand Sheela and Christian Kracht in 2008

In 2003, Woodard, then a resident of Juniper Hills, California, proposed a sister city relationship with Nueva Germania, Paraguay. Nueva Germania had originally been founded as a "racially pure utopian settlement" for Germans, and Woodard said he was "drawn to the idea of an Aryan vacuum in the middle of the jungle" but denied being a white supremacist. He visited the settlement in 2004 and wrote a composition for the place entitled "Our Jungle Holy Land". According to Andrew McCann, Nueva Germania was by this time a place where "descendants of original settlers live under drastically reduced circumstances" and that Woodard was moved to "advance the cultural profile of the community, and to build a miniature Bayreuth opera house on the site of what was once Elisabeth Förster-Nietzsche's family residence."

He met Swiss novelist Christian Kracht in 2003. In 2006, Woodard and Kracht presented their Nueva Germania project during a conference titled "Nueva Germania – Failed eugenics in the jungles of Paraguay", that was hosted in Berlin by Rafael Horzon.

In 2011, a book of correspondence between Woodard and Kracht was published, under the title Five Years. The book was criticized for its far-right and New Right opinions, and for the authors' ties to Nueva Germania. An analysis of the book described it as "uncertain" textually, with difficulty distinguishing irony and seriousness, closer to a novel in form.

== Wikipedia promotion campaign ==
In 2025, Wikipedia editors uncovered what was described as the "single largest self-promotion operation in Wikipedia's history", in which a network of around 200 sock puppet accounts and numerous proxy IPs created or edited articles in 335 languages to promote Woodard for over a decade. A Wikipedia editor with the username Grnrchst suggested that the accounts were likely to have been operated by Woodard or people close to him. Following an investigation by Grnrchst, who later wrote about their findings in the English Wikipedia's newsletter, The Signpost, Wikipedia stewards and local communities deleted over 300 articles and banned associated accounts.
