= Apocalypse Culture =

1987 anthology edited by Adam Parfrey

- Cover of the first edition
- Editor: Adam Parfrey
- Cover artist: Joe Coleman
- Language: English
- Subject: Fringe literature
- Published: Amok Press (1987); Feral House (1990)
- Media type: Print
- Pages: 272
- ISBN: 0-941693-02-3
- OCLC: 15591230
- Dewey Decimal: 001.1
- LC Class: CB430 .A66 1987
- Followed by: Apocalypse Culture II

Apocalypse Culture, or just Apocalypse, is an anthology of the fringe and transgressive edited by Adam Parfrey and first published by his publishing house Amok Press in 1987. Three years later, it was republished in an expanded and revised edition by Parfrey's second publishing house, Feral House. The book, named after Parfrey's fringe cultural scene, defines itself as "an exhaustive tour through the nether regions of today's psychotic brainscape"; it contains writings from, among others, anarchist Hakim Bey and journalist Thomas McEvilley, as well as avowed neo-Nazis, Satanists, pedophiles, necrophiles, and writing from Parfrey himself.

Though controversial, the book was popular with its audience and sold well, reportedly having sold at least 100,000 copies by 2010. The expanded edition contains largely different content. It was a success for Parfrey, his earliest book to achieve this kind of success, and became a cult classic in some circles. The book was banned in Russia in 2006. It was followed by a sequel, Apocalypse Culture II, in 2000.

== Background ==
Adam Parfrey was an American writer, editor, and publisher known for his publication of outsider works. He was the creator of the publishing house Amok Press and its successor Feral House. Seattle Weekly described him in 2010 as "one of the nation's most provocative publishers". Many of the works he published were extremely controversial, and he had connections to some neo-Nazis and white supremacists.

The title of the anthology, "apocalypse culture", is what Parfrey dubbed his fringe cultural scene. "Apocalypse culture" has been described by Mark Harrison as "a literary and cultural milieu for those fascinated with eschatology, or the study of last things", including discussions of, among other topics, mind control, paraphilia, and fascism.

== Publication history ==
It was first published by Parfrey's publisher Amok Press in 1987. An expanded and revised edition was published in Port Townsend in 1990 by Feral House, a publisher he founded after the publication of the first edition.

The book was reported to have sold 100,000 copies by 2010, and was one of Parfrey's most successful books. It was Parfey's earliest book to achieve fame. A sequel, Apocalypse Culture II, was published by Feral House in 2000.

In 2006, it and its sequel were translated into Russian in 2006 and published combined as one volume by the Russian counterculture publisher Ultra.Kultura as Культура времен Апокалипсиса. The book was afterwards banned in Russia as "drug propaganda" (a single entry in the sequel is about ketamine) and all copies were confiscated.

== Contents ==
The book, an anthology volume, defines itself as "an exhaustive tour through the nether regions of today’s psychotic brainscape". The book begins with a blurb by J. G. Ballard, who calls the book a collection of the "terminal documents of the twentieth century". Following that is a quote from Werner Herzog: "There is nothing more terrifying than stupidity". It focuses on fringe and transgressive behavior, including socially and sexually. Parfrey notes in an introduction that "The reader of Apocalypse Culture will soon begin to notice a preponderance of materials from individuals who have the audacity to consider themselves their own best authority, in repudiation or ignorance of the orthodoxy factories of Church, University, or State." The contents of the anthology are similar to Exit, a prior magazine created by Parfrey. The 1990 edition has much new content and also lacks much of the content of the 1987 edition. Both editions are illustrated and contain the short biographies on and the contact information of the writers included, when available.

Chapters include interviews with Peter Sotos, the creator of the serial killer and pro-pedophile zine Pure, and another interview with necrophiliac Karen Greenlee. Several entries are written by Parfrey himself, discussing, among other topics, self-castration and the modern aesthetic being terroristic in nature. There is a large amount of neo-Nazi material in the book. It includes flyers from neo-Nazi James Mason, later the author of Siege, a selection from Adolf Hitler, Savitri Devi's The Lightning and the Sun, and Holocaust denier Michael A. Hoffman II.

=== 1987 version ===
Chapter list
Section	Title	Author	Subjects/Details
—N/a	"Prelude"	Adam Parfrey	
Apocalypse Theologies	"Latter-Day Lycanthropy: Battling for the Feral Soul of Man"	Adam Parfrey	Lycanthropy
Apocalypse Theologies	"The Unrepentant Necrophile: An Interview with Karen Greenlee"	Jim Morton	Interview with the necrophiliac Karen Greenlee.
Apocalypse Theologies	"Infernal Texts"	Various	Selections from the works of Mel Lyman, Louis Wolfson, Dan Burros, Edmund Burke, Savitri Devi's The Lightning and the Sun, Genesis P-Orridge
Apocalypse Theologies	"The Time of The End Is Now: Texts from The Process"	Boyd Rice	Not in revised edition.
Apocalypse Theologies	"Opiates, Brainwashing, and Fasting: A Physiological Understanding of the Oracular Process"	Tim O'Neill	Not in revised edition.
Apocalypse Theologies	"The Disciples of Flesh"	Tim O'Neill	Not in revised edition.
Apocalypse Theologies	"The Last Defense of LSD"	Joseph Lanz	Not in revised edition.
Apocalypse Theologies	"Psychois in Illumination: LSD's Internalized Imperium"		Not in revised edition.
Apocalypse Theologies	"A New Dawn Has Come..."	Adolf Hitler	Not in revised edition.
Apocalypse Theologies	"Instructions for the Kali-Yuga"	Hakim Bey	Kali
Apocalypse Art	"Schizophrenic Responses to a Mad World: Love, Lithium, and the Loot of Lima"	James Anubis Van Cleve	Schizophrenia
Apocalypse Art	"A Metaphysics of Disaster: The Spurt of Blood As Revelation"	Elinor Fuchs	Not in revised edition.
Apocalypse Art	"Art in the Dark"	Thomas McEvilley	Hermann Nitsch
Apocalypse Art	"Body Play"	Fakir Musafar	Body modification
Apocalypse Art	"Fakir Musafar Interview"	Kristine Ambrosia and Joseph Lanza	
Apocalypse Art	"Interview with Peter Sotos of Pure"	Paul Lemos	An interview with Peter Sotos, the creator of the pro-pedophile and serial killer zine Pure.
Apocalypse Art	"Aesthetic Terrorism"	Adam Parfrey	
Apocalypse Art	"The Case Against Art"	John Zerzan	
Apocalypse Science	"Every Science is a Mutilated Octopus"	Charles Fort	Quotations collected by Joseph Lanz and Michael A. Hoffman II
Apocalypse Science	"From Orgasm to UFOs: Wilhelm Reich's Contact With Space"	Adam Parfrey	Orgone
Apocalypse Science	"The Cosmic Pulse of Life"	Trevor James Constable	Wilhelm Reich
Apocalypse Science	"Eugenics: The Orphaned Science"	Adam Parfrey	Quotations from Numbers, Plato, Thomas Malthus, Count Arthur de Gobineau, Sir Francis Galton, Charles Darwin, Alfred Russel Wallace, Herbert Spencer, Dr. Alexander Graham Bell, Houston Stewart Chamberlain, Havelock Ellis, Madison Grant, Paul Popenoe & Roswell Hill Johnson, H.A. Schultz, Albert Edward Wiggam, Adolf Hitler, Justice Oliver Wendell Holmes, Bertrand Russell, Rudolf Frerks, Lothrop Stoddard, A.F. Tregold, Aldous Huxley, Paul R. Ehrlich, Edward O. Wilson, Arthur Jensen, and The New York Times
Apocalypse Science	"Nature as Slave: Satanic Technology and the West"	Oswald Spengler, Jim Brandon	Selections from Brandon's The Rebirth of Pan and Spengler's Man and Technics and Twilight of the Evening Lands
Apocalypse Science	"Man A Machine"	David Paul	
Apocalypse Science	"Beyond the Pleasure Principle: towards a body without organs"	Gregory Whitehead	Not in revised edition.
Apocalypse Science	"Quantum Mechanics and Chaos Theory: Anarchist Meditations on N. Herbert's Quantum Reality: Beyond the New Physics"	Hakim Bey	Not in revised edition.
Apocalypse Politics	"Vagaries of Negation: Data on the Decomposition of Society"	John Zerzan	Not in revised edition.
Apocalypse Politics	"Let's Do Justice for our Comrade P-38"	Red Brigades	
Apocalypse Politics	"The Theology of Nuclear War"	Larry Kickham	Not in revised edition.
Apocalypse Politics	"From the Mark of the Beast to the Black Messiah Phenomenon: The Chronicles of Ron J. Steele, Investigative Reporter & Prophetic Author"	Adam Parfrey	Big Brother, false messiahs and Michael Jackson as a possible Black Messiah
Apocalypse Politics	"The Christian Theory of Occult Conspiracy"	Damian 1247 (Adjutor 9 = 2) (actually Tim O'Neill)	
Apocalypse Politics	"Society for the Eradication of Television Fact Sheet"		
Apocalypse Politics	"Alchemical Conspiracy and the Death of the West: An Introduction to James Shelby Downard's King-Kill/33°	Michael A. Hoffman II	Not in revised edition.
Apocalypse Politics	"King-Kill/33': Masonic Symbolism in the Assassination of John F. Kennedy"	James Shelby Downard	Not in revised edition.

=== 1990 edition ===
Chapter list
Section	Title	Author	Subjects/Details
—N/a	"Preface to the Second Edition"	Adam Parfrey	
Apocalypse Theologies	"Latter-Day Lycanthropy: Battling for the Feral Soul of Man"	Adam Parfrey	Same as first edition
Apocalypse Theologies	"The Unrepentant Necrophile: An Interview with Karen Greenlee"	Jim Morton	Same as first edition
Apocalypse Theologies	"Infernal Texts"	Various	Modified from first edition. Selections from the works of Mel Lyman, Louis Wolfson, Dan Burros, Edmund Burke, Savitri Devi's The Lightning and the Sun, Boyd Rice, John Whiteside Parsons, Robert de Grimston, and P. T. Barnum
Apocalypse Theologies	"Frank Talk from a Psychopath"	Adam Parfrey	Aspiring mass murderer
Apocalypse Theologies	"G.G. Allin: Portrait of the Enemy"	Adam Parfrey	
Apocalypse Theologies	"Aesthetic Terrorism"	Adam Parfrey	Same as first edition
Apocalypse Theologies	"Interview with Peter Sotos of Pure"	Paul Lemos	Same as first edition
Apocalypse Theologies	"Schizophrenic Responses to a Mad World: Love, Lithium, and the Loot of Lima"	James Anubis Van Cleve	Same as first edition
Apocalypse Theologies	"Art in the Dark"	Thomas McEvilley	Same as first edition
Apocalypse Theologies	"Instructions for the Kali-Yuga"	Hakim Bey	Same as first edition
Apocalypse Theologies	"Surgeons and Gluttons in the House of Flesh: Notes on the Hidden Unity between the Additive and Subtractive Festishes"	Tim O'Neill	Body modification
Apocalypse Theologies	"Cut it Off: A Case for Self-Castration"	Adam Parfrey	
Apocalypse Theologies	"Body Play"	Fakir Musafar	Same as first edition
Apocalypse Theologies	"Fakir Musafar Interview"	Kristine Ambrosia and Joseph Lanza	Same as first edition
Apocalypse Theologies	"The Case Against Art"	John Zerzan	Same as first edition
Apocalypse Theologies	"Man A Machine"	David Paul	Same as first edition
Apocalypse Theologies	"Let's Do Justice for our Comrade P-38"	Red Brigades	Same as first edition
Apocalypse Theologies	"Long Live Death!"	The Abraxas Foundation	Quotations from Heraclitus, Jonathan Swift, Charles IX, Owen, Chidiock Tichborne, Yukio Mishima, Fyodor Dostoevsky, Gabriele D'Annunzio, Sigmund Freud, Robert Jay Mathews, Rudolf von Sebottendorf, Vladimir Bukovsky, Richard Wagner, Jack London, the Richard Strauss opera Elektra, Ragnar Redbeard, Walt Whitman, and P. Luftig
Apocalypse Theologies	"The Muslim Program"	Elijah Muhammad	from The Fall of America
Apocalypse Theologies	"Mel Lyman: God's Own Story"	John Aes-Nihil	Mel Lyman
Apocalypse Theologies	"The Process: A Personal Reminiscence"	R. N. Taylor	Process Church of the Final Judgement, Robert de Grimston
Apocalypse Theologies	"Sorcerer of Apocalypse: An Introduction to John Whiteside Parsons"	Michael Staley	
The Invisible War	"The Invisible War"	Anton LaVey	Weather control, Black noise, White noise, Microwave Radiation
The Invisible War	"The Cereal Box Conspiracy Against the Developing Mind"	Michelle Handelman and Monte Cazazza	
The Invisible War	"Society for the Eradication of Television Fact Sheet"		Same as first edition
The Invisible War	"From the Mark of the Beast to the Black Messiah Phenomenon: The Chronicles of Ron J. Steele, Investigative Reporter & Prophetic Author"	Adam Parfrey	Same as first edition
The Invisible War	"Satori & Pornography: Canonization through Degradation"	Christian Shapiro	
The Invisible War	"Eugenics: The Orphaned Science"	Adam Parfrey	Same as in first edition
The Invisible War	"How to Kill: Are Afrikan People Subjects of a Genocidal Plot?"	Harry Allen	Interview with Jack White and Asiba Tupahache
The Invisible War	"Agriculture: Demon Engine of Civilization"	John Zerzan	
The Invisible War	"Nature as Slave: Satanic Technology and the West"	Oswald Spengler, Jim Brandon	Same as first edition
The Invisible War	"Every Science is a Mutilated Octopus"	Charles Fort	Same as first edition
The Invisible War	"From Orgasm to UFOs: Wilhelm Reich's Contact With Space"	Adam Parfrey	Same as first edition
The Invisible War	"The Cosmic Pulse of Life"	Trevor James Constable	Same as first edition
The Invisible War	"Who Rules Over Earth?: The Archetype of the World Ruler and the Work of Universal Regeneration"	Tim O'Neill	
The Invisible War	"The Christian Right, Zionism, and the Coming of the Penteholocaust"	Gregory Krupey	Rev. Jerry Falwell, Rev. James Robison, Ronald Reagan, Hal Lindsey, Judgement Day, End times, the Al-Aqsa Mosque, Rabbi Moshe Levinger, the Temple Mount, Jesse Helms, the Jerusalem Temple Foundation
The Invisible War	"A History of Vengeance and Assassination in Secret Societies"	Tim O'Neill	Freemasonry, Illuminati, Hassan-i-Sabah, the Knights Templar
The Invisible War	"The Call to Chaos: From Adam to Atom By Way of the Jornada del Muerto"	James Shelby Downard	Alchemy, Adam Kadmon, Synergism
The Invisible War	"Meditations on the Atom and Time: An Attempt to Define the Imagery of War and Death in the Late Twentieth Century"	Dennis Stillings	Nuclear War, the atomic bomb, Gnosticism, the apocatastsis

== Reception and legacy ==
The book was well-received with its audience. A contemporary review from Melody Maker's John Wilde called it "unputdownable". Jay Kinney said that "by unearthing direct communiques from some of the human race's most unsettling thought-criminals, Parfrey helps broaden our grasp of what people are capable of thinking ... and doing." but that the book contained much "out-and-out sociopathic material". Writer Mark Dery was critical, calling the book an "unsavory spectacle", and said that reading the book was an experience "where one is left with gelatinous, unsubstantial opinion and pitifully few facts". Parfrey responded in turn, writing that the sheer negativity of the review pleased him.

A retrospective note in The Daily Telegraph said it had become an "instant underground cult classic", for its "compilation of some of the craziest beliefs and forms of behavior". The writer noted these were more marginal in the past. Spencer Sunshine described it as "infamous" and as a "cult classic" in underground circles. Scholar Jeffrey Kaplan wrote that it had become "an instant underground classic with its bizarre collection". Seattle Weekly said that the book is what cemented Parfrey as "the enfant terrible of the publishing world". Its platforming of neo-Nazi authors has received criticism; Sunshine wrote that if "one wished to read White Supremacist and neo-Nazi literature, Apocalypse Culture had a sampling on offer".

Parfrey claimed in a 2010 interview that many people had told him the book had "changed their lives", in that "the culture that was provided them in school and so on was expanded [in Apocalypse Culture] and torn apart."
