= Christina Ward =

American author (born 1969)

- Born: April 4, 1969 (age 57); Milwaukee, Wisconsin, U.S.
- Occupations: Writer, editor, owner of Feral House Publishing
- Writing career
- Genre: Sociology of food
- Subjects: Transgressive fiction, Short story, Food preservation, Cookbook, Culinary History
- Website: www.christinaward.net

Christina Ward is an American writer specializing in food preservation, recipe, and culinary history books, and the owner of Feral House Publishing.

== Career ==
=== Writing ===
Ward's works include transgressive poetry and short stories published in zines under multiple pseudonyms. In 2000, Ward began publishing small-run art books under the imprint of Back Pocket Press and Odaliske Press and co-publishing poetry broadsides and chapbook under the name Accurate Key.

Between 2012 and 2016, Ward wrote a monthly column for Edible Milwaukee Magazine named DIY-MKE: that focused on the history, personal stories, and recipes that reflect Milwaukee city's culture.

Ward published her first book, Preservation: The Art and Science of Canning, Fermentation, and Dehydration (2017), with the Feral House imprint, Process.

Ward's second book, American Advertising Cookbooks: How Corporations Taught Us to Love Spam, Bananas, and Jell-O (2019), was reviewed in the New York Times and Milwaukee Journal Sentinel.

In July 2019, Ward provided research about Milwaukee food culture for the producers of the Hulu broadcast episodic program Taste the Nation with Padma Lakshmi. She appeared on camera with host and executive producer Padma Lakshmi for episode 2 of season 1, where they discussed Milwaukee's early immigrant food culture, while riding around in the Oscar Mayer Wienermobile.

Holy Food: How Cults, Communes, and Religious Movements Influenced What We Eat (2023) is an exploration of various cults, communes, and religious movements are connected to food they created or incorporated and how that food may continue on in today's society.

Her fourth book is Happy Days: The Official Cookbook.

=== Feral House ===
In 2011, Ward assisted touring authors published by Feral House with events in Milwaukee, Wisconsin. In January 2015, she began to work full-time for Feral House in marketing and publicity.

Parfrey died on May 5, 2018 and his sister, managing director and head of operations, asked Ward to assist her in continuing Feral House Publishing. Ward was promoted to vice president.

On February 10, 2026, Feral House announced that Ward had assumed ownership of Feral House Publishing and its imprint Process Media.

== Published works ==
- Preservation-The Art and Science of Canning, Fermentation, and Dehydration (Process Media, 2017) ISBN 978-1934170694
- American Advertising Cookbooks: How Corporations Taught Us to Love Bananas, Spam, and Jell-O (Process Media, 2019) ISBN 978-1934170748
- Holy Food: How Cults, Communes, and Religious Movements Influenced What We Eat (Feral House, 2023) ISBN 9781934170922
- Happy Days: The Official Cookbook (Insight Editions, 2024) ISBN 979-8886633566
