= Mind machine =

Meditation device

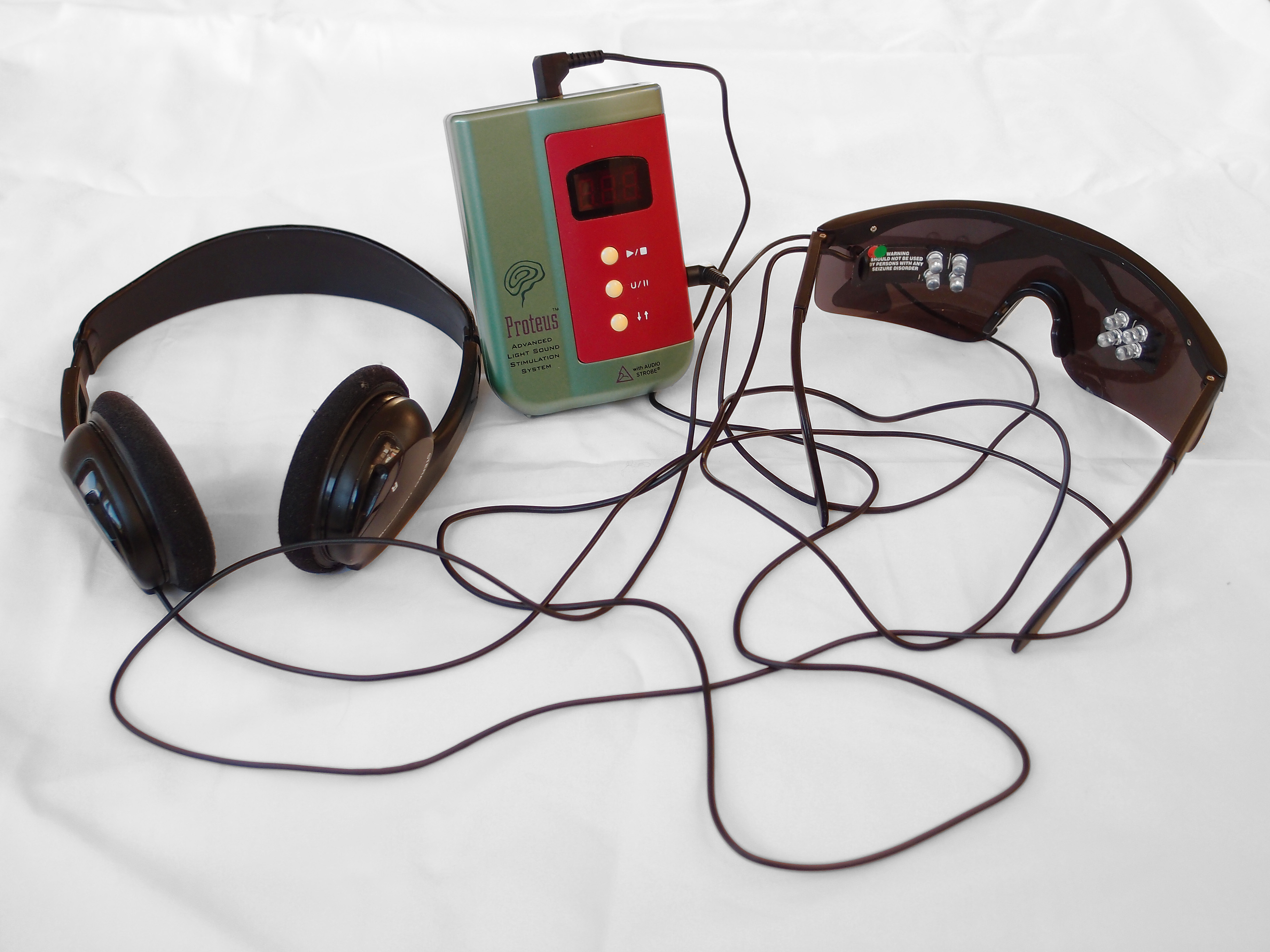
A light and sound machine with headphones and strobe light goggles

A mind machine (aka brain machine or light and sound machine) uses pulsing rhythmic sound, flashing light, or a combination of these. Mind machines can induce deep states of relaxation or concentration.

The process applied by some of these machines is said to induce brainwave entrainment or synchronization.

== History ==
The influence of rhythmic sounds and drums to enter altered states of consciousness is used in different indigenous tribes (see Shamanic music), as well as optical stimulation produced by the flickering light of camp fires or pressing lightly on the eyeballs. This "stroboscopic photo-stimulation produces 'photic driving', the alpha type of brain electrical activity associated with an altered state in which people are susceptible to suggestion". ( p. 12).

The first scientific observations were made by William Charles Wells in the 1790s who described different effects of binocular vision. His results were later transferred to be applied in binaural beats. Visual experiments with flickering lights were conducted in the 1940s by William Grey Walter who used stroboscopic light flashes to measure their effects on brain activity, assessed with EEG. He reported effect not just on visual areas but on the whole cortex.

The development of alpha EEG feedback (see neurofeedback) is an important starting point for biofeedback and its explicit use for entering altered states of consciousness. Enterprises started to produce different types of mind machines and some scientists followed the line of research to explore if and how these devices elicit effects on brain processes.

In the late 1980s and early 1990s Farley initiated an investigation concerning medical claims made by some manufacturers and sellers. The FDA concluded that Light and Sound Machines were not medical devices and did not warrant regulation. Sellers and manufacturers were given guidelines for how they could advertise these devices, and were required to include a disclaimer and cautionary document with each machine. Nowadays, mind machines are rediscovered by some teenage cultures as so called "digital drugs", a legal way to enter altered states of consciousness.

== Application ==
Mind machines include flashing light devices, which are similar to the Brion Gysin Dreamachine in that both produce a flickering visual field. Unlike flashing light devices, the Dreamachine can be used by several people at once, but has few, if any, technical features.

=== Technical setting ===
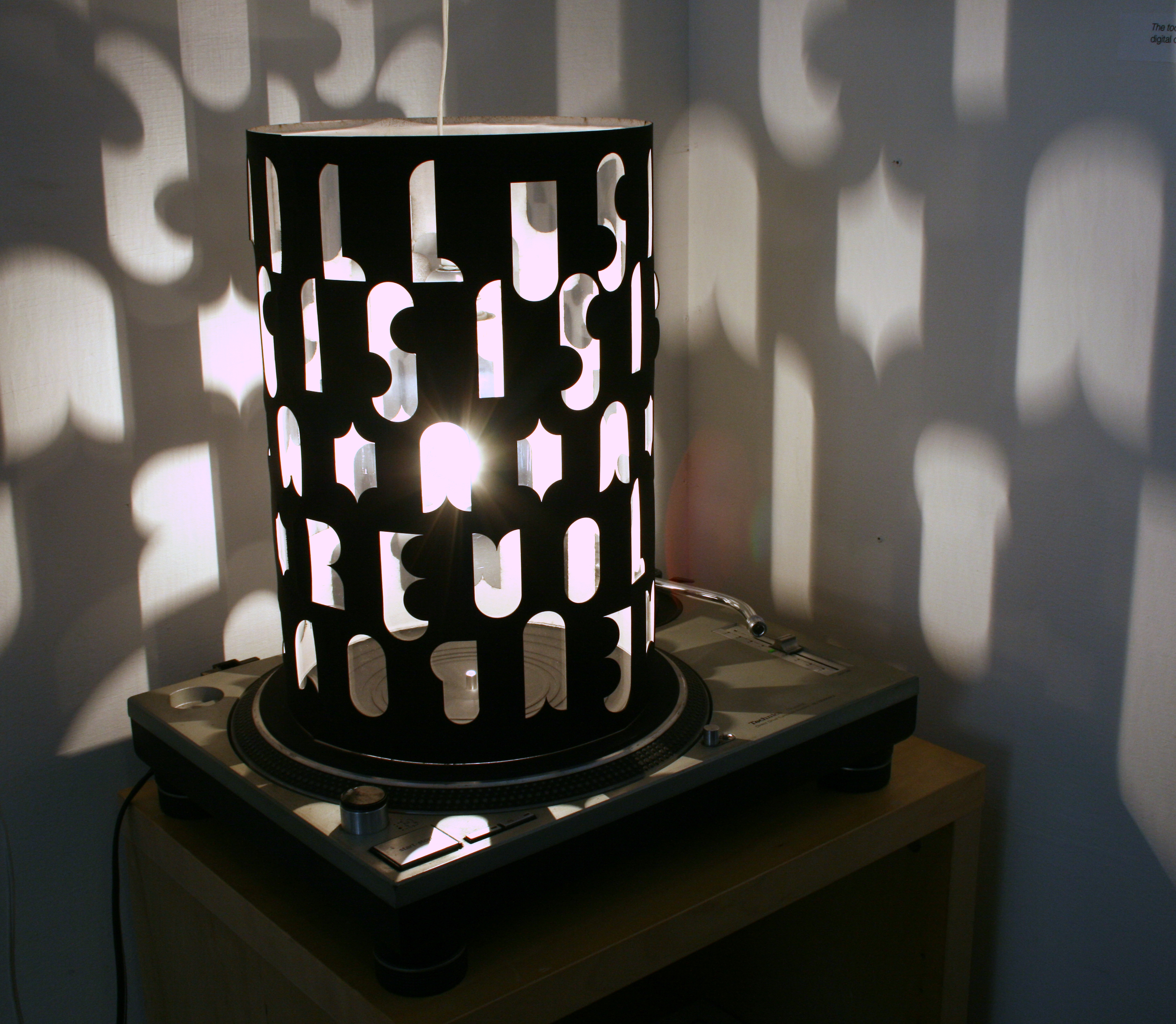
A Brion Gysin Dreamachine

Mind machines typically consist of a control unit, a pair of headphones and/or strobe light goggles. The unit controls the sessions and drives the LEDs in the goggles. Professionally, they are usually referred to as Auditory Visual Stimulation Devices (AVS devices). Some mind machines available today can even connect to the Internet to download additional session material.

=== Regulation ===
Mind machine devices are legally available throughout the United States from many sources.

With some exceptions, these devices commonly do not have FDA approval for medical applications in the US. They have been found by a U.S. district court to be Class III medical devices, and consequentially require FDA pre-market approval for all medical uses. One company making medical claims for a possibly unsafe device has been shut down and seen their devices destroyed.

== See also ==
- Electroencephalography
- Event-related potential
- Evoked potential
- Hemi-Sync
- Human enhancement
