= Dreamachine =

Stroboscopic light art designed by Ian Somnerville & Brion Gysin

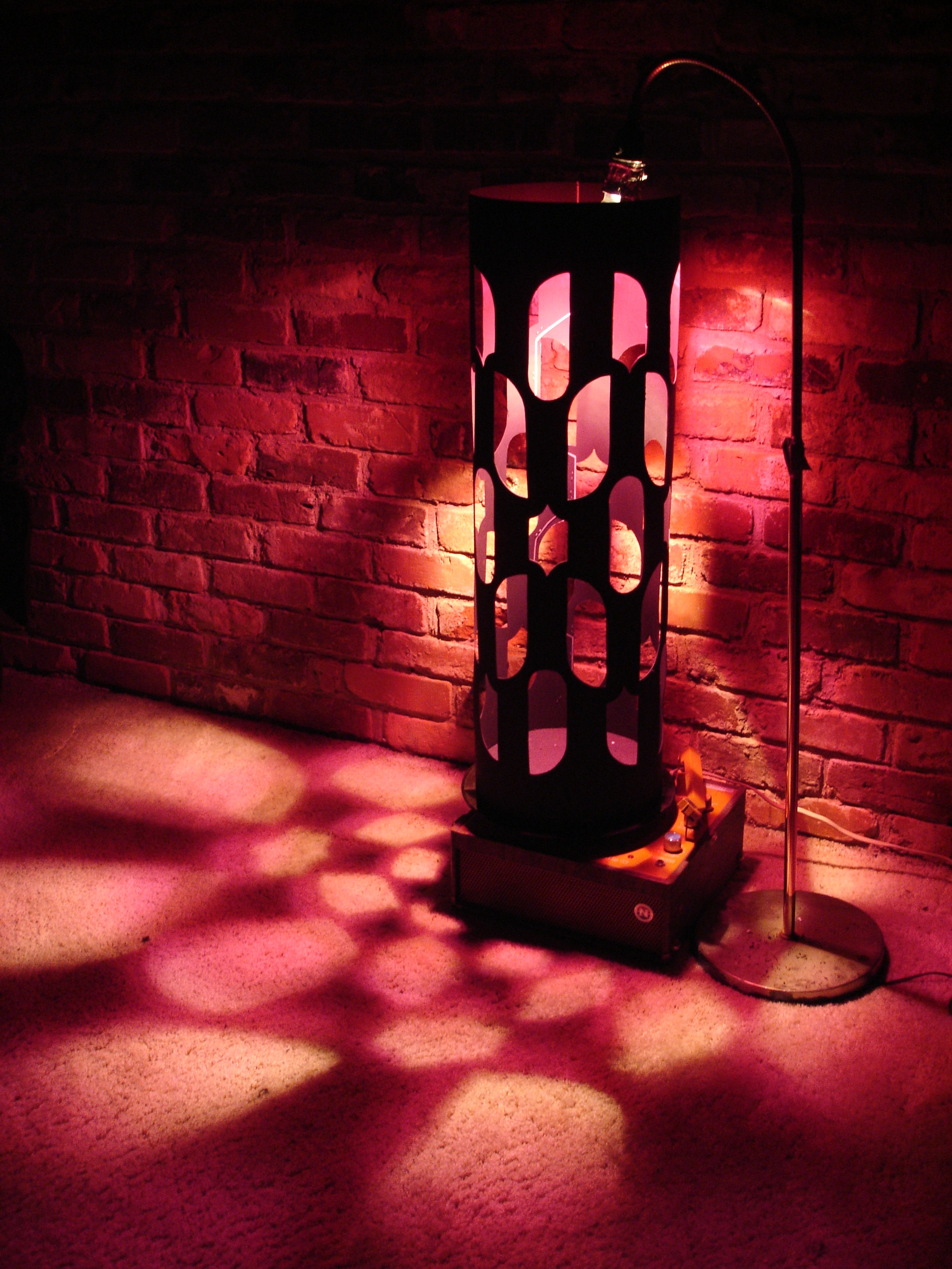
An anonymous example of a makeshift Dreamachine

The Dreamachine (a contraction of Dream Machine), invented in 1959 by Brion Gysin and Ian Sommerville, is a stroboscopic flickering light art device that produces eidetic visual stimuli.

== Description ==
In its original form, a Dreamachine is a work of light art made from a cylinder with regularly spaced shapes cut out of its sides. The cylinder is then placed on a record turntable and rotated, depending on the scale, at either 78 or 45 revolutions per minute. A light bulb is suspended in the center of the cylinder with the rotation speed making light emanate from the holes at a consistently pulsating frequency range of 8–13 flickers per second. It is meant to be looked at through closed eyelids, upon which moving yantra-like mandala visual patterns emerge, and an alpha wave mental state is induced. The frequency of the pulsations corresponds to the electrical oscillations normally present in the human brain while relaxing.

In 1996, the Los Angeles Times deemed David Woodard's iteration of the Dreamachine "the most interesting object" in William Burroughs' major visual retrospective Ports of Entry at LACMA. In a 2019 critical study, Raj Chandarlapaty, a scholar of the Beat movement, revisits and examines Woodard's "idea-shattering" approach to the Dreamachine.

The same flickering light effect is used in modern electronic devices known as mind machines.

== Use ==
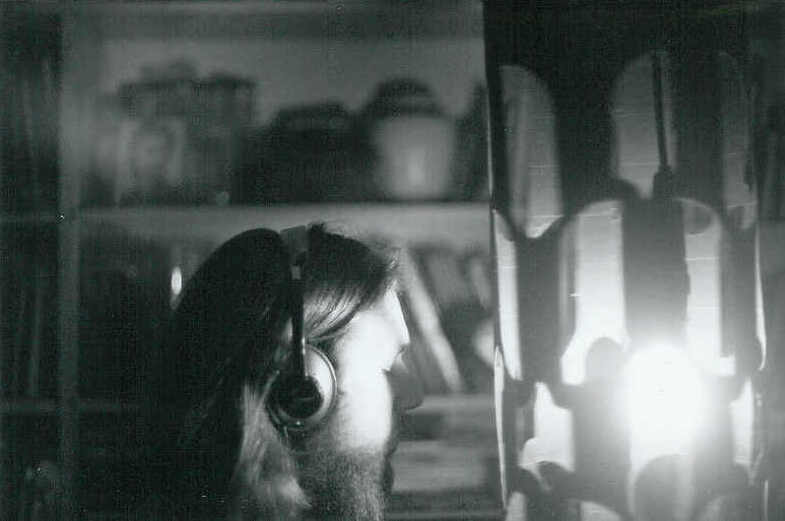
Man during a Dreamachine session

A Dreamachine is "viewed" with the eyes closed: the pulsating light stimulates the optic nerve and thus alters the brain's electrical oscillations. As users adjust to the experience, they see increasingly complex animated yantra-like patterns of color behind their closed eyelids (similar effects may be seen when travelling as a passenger in a car or bus; close your eyes as the vehicle passes through the flickering shadows cast by regularly spaced roadside trees, streetlights or tunnel striplights—these were the hypnagogic effects Brion Gysin said he sought to recreate with the device). It is claimed that by using a Dreamachine meditatively, users enter an alpha wave, or hypnagogic state. This experience may sometimes be quite intense, but to escape from it, one needs only to open one's eyes. The Dreamachine may be dangerous for persons with photosensitive epilepsy or other nervous disorders.

It is thought that one out of 10,000 adults will experience a seizure while viewing the device; about twice as many children will have a similar ill effect.

== Legacy ==
After a period of relative art-historical neglect, a Dreamachine was included in the UK touring exhibition, 'Dream Machines' curated by the artist Susan Hiller in 2000, which presented a survey of artworks intended to induce altered states of consciousness. In the accompanying catalogue, Hiller – who had been introduced to the Dreamachine by Sommerville in the late 1960s – described it as a "germinal work" within Western art concerned with the psychology of consciousness, hailing its capacity to "kick-start the visionary capacities of spectators".

Artworks titled Dreamachine or Dream Machine and based on or made in homage to Gysin and Sommerville's invention have subsequently been produced by several different artists, including Shezad Dawood and Haroon Mirza.

In 2010, the landmark retrospective, 'Brion Gysin: Dream Machine', was held at the New Museum in New York and featured an original working Dreamachine.

In 2022, the touring festival, Unboxed: Creativity in the UK, included a Dreamachine project involving a series of microcontroller-controlled lights rather than a rotating cylinder, and a surround-sound soundtrack by Jon Hopkins. The experience was scaled up to use an octagonal facility two storeys high with a capacity of about 20 people at once in a circular seating arrangement. It was praised by a reviewer in The Guardian as "as close to state-funded psychedelic drugs as you can get".

== See also ==
- Brainwave entrainment
- Jan E. Purkyně
- Mind machine
