= Propaganda (magazine) =

US gothic subculture magazine

- Propaganda magazine, issues 17 and 18. The background copy features Diamanda Galas on the cover.
- Founder: Fred H. Berger
- Founded: 1982
- Final issue: 2002
- Country: United States
- Based in: New Hyde Park, New York
- ISSN: 0737-0776

Propaganda was an American gothic subculture magazine founded in 1982 by Fred H. Berger, a photographer from New York City. Berger's photography was featured prominently in the magazine. Propaganda focused on all aspects of the goth culture including fashion, sexuality, music, art and literature. Propaganda was, at the time of its final issue in 2002, the longest running and most popular gothic subculture magazine in the United States.

== History ==
Photographer and journalist Fred H. Berger was inspired to create Propaganda based on his interest in the gothic, industrial, darkwave, occult and fetish subcultures. Berger's official title was not editor-in-chief, but "Propaganda Minister". Between 1991 and 1994 Propaganda produced three videos - The Trilogy mirroring the Holy Inquisition and the Holocaust, Blood Countess chronicling the murderous Countess Elizabeth Bathory, and The Ritual dealing with human sacrifice and black magic. The magazine featured interviews and coverage of music acts such as Bauhaus, Xmal Deutschland, Laibach, Skinny Puppy, Fields of the Nephilim, The Sisters of Mercy, Diamanda Galas, Jesus & Mary Chain, Siouxsie And The Banshees, Coil, Christian Death, Alien Sex Fiend, Swans, Legendary Pink Dots, My Life with the Thrill Kill Kult, Shadow Project, Xymox, Death in June, Dead Can Dance, Front Line Assembly, The Cure, Danzig and Love & Rockets. Other subjects included articles about the Salem Witch Trials, the Holy Lance, Vlad the Impaler, Joan of Arc, the Masque of the Red Death, Oscar Wilde, the Haunted Summer with Lord Byron and Mary Shelley, and queer chic authors Jean Genet and Yukio Mishima. Interviews with favorite goth authors Anne Rice and Poppy Z. Brite were also featured, as well as travel pieces such as "Old Haunts In New Orleans" and "Tokyo A-Go-Go."

== Photography ==
Berger's photography was a large focus for the magazine. Androgynous male models were commonly used.

== Legacy ==
Dark fantasy and horror writer Nancy Kilpatrick called Propaganda "probably the only subculture publication known to just about every goth on the planet". Matt Riser, the publisher of Newgrave, another gothic subculture magazine, credited Propaganda as being an influence in him starting his own publication.
