= Joe Coleman (painter) =

American painter (born 1955)

- Born: November 22, 1955 (age 70); Norwalk, Connecticut
- Known for: Painter, illustrator, performance artist
- Spouses: Nancy Pivar (m. 1981; div. 1990); Whitney Ward (m. 2000)
- Website: joecoleman.com

Joseph Coleman (born November 22, 1955) is an American painter, illustrator, actor and performance artist. He has been described as the "walking ghost of Old America" by his wife, photographer Whitney Ward, for his over-riding interest in the historical arcana and personae that often populate his paintings. Of Coleman's work, The New York Times wrote that, “If P. T. Barnum had hired Breughel or Bosch to paint sideshow banners, they might have resembled the art of Joe Coleman.” While Berlin's Tagesspiegel said of Coleman, "Like [George] Grosz in the 1920s, he holds a drastic mirror up to his own times."

Coleman lives and works in Brooklyn, New York. His apartment and studio, called the Odditorium, is a living museum to his obsessions; a collection of artifacts, objects and documents from wax museums, crime museums, churches, pathology museums and sideshows.

== Early life ==
"Mommy/Daddy" (1994) by Joe Coleman.

Coleman was born in Norwalk, Connecticut, to a World War II-veteran father and the daughter of a professional prizefighter. Coleman's birth date (11/22/55) and childhood home address (99 Ward Street), which all feature palindromic numbers, has fed a lifelong obsession with duality, reflection and symmetry that is represented in his work; as in his 1994 painting ''Mommy/Daddy'', a split portrait of his parents as two halves of the same body, standing over an image of his childhood home and the grave in which they are both buried. Coleman's mother was a devout Catholic and, as a child, Coleman spent many hours in church. He would draw the stations of the cross in pencil using red crayon to represent the blood of the saints and Christ. Around age 5, his mother gave him a book of paintings by Hieronymous Bosch. Also obsessed with comics, especially EC Comics, he began drawing his own. He has said his first collector was Lady Bird Johnson, who bought a painting he made of garbage in 1965 for a children's art collection, as part of her ‘beautification’ campaign.

In 1973 he moved to New York and supported himself by driving a cab. “Times Square was a red light district,” said Coleman. “I was a taxi driver back then, like Travis Bickle, but the stuff I saw in my taxi was way worse than that movie.” The street life he saw behind the wheel bled into his paintings and artwork from this period, which he described as ‘human-scapes’.

== Career ==
=== Early work ===
In 1977, he self-published two mini-comix and produced a portfolio of ten graphite on paper drawings (The Joe Coleman Portfolio) that with its depictions of outsiders, freak shows and both historical and present day tableau, showing life in all its raw, unfiltered, gory detail, set the tone, style and subject matter of his later work. His first professionally published work appeared in issues of Bizarre Sex and Dope Comix, two underground comics titles published by Kitchen Sink Press.

He attended the School of Visual Arts (SVA) in New York for two years. While at SVA he started performing with punk band The Steel Tips, who were immortalized in an early 1979 painting, styled as a sideshow banner. The Steel Tips played at CBGB, as well as in strip clubs, a prison, an insane asylum, and a benefit for female alcoholics held in a church.

In 1982, Coleman self-published a full-length comic book, The Mystery of Wolverine Woo-Bait.

=== Paintings ===
Taken as a whole, Joe Coleman's body of paintings presents an ongoing exegesis of his life, influences, obsessions, family and friends with a particular focus on the pathological and the psychological, the sacred and the profane, pop culture and high art, and the inter-relations between them. He has painted portraits of a broad range of figures, both historical and contemporary, that include saints and sinners, writers (Edgar Allan Poe, Hunter S. Thompson, Louis-Ferdinand Celine, Jack Black), artists (George Grosz, Adolf Wolfli, Henry Darger), madmen (Charles Manson), actors (Buster Keaton, Leo Gorcey, Jayne Mansfield), murderers (Ed Gein, Mary Bell, Albert Fish, Carl Panzram), musicians (Hasil Adkins, Hank Williams, Captain Beefheart, King Khan), visionaries (Harry Houdini), freaks (Johnny Eck, Joseph Merrick a.k.a. the Elephant Man). He has also painted portraits of obscure or controversial figures in American history (Boston Corbett; abolitionist John Brown; Swift Runner, a Cree Indian in the thrall of Wendigo psychosis). Over the years, he has also painted portraits of many of his closest friends, including tattoo artist, writer, and painter Jonathan Shaw, and motorcycle builder and stunt rider Indian Larry. He has also produced many self-portraits and numerous portraits of his wife and muse Whitney Ward.

The portrait paintings in particular are the fruit of Coleman's voluminous research into his subjects, which he has often compared to an archeological dig to excavate their true nature. The portraits take the form of a large central figure surrounded by depictions of episodes in the lives of his subjects that contributed to the development of their pathology, and influenced the drives and motivations that determine the course of their lives.

Coleman did the original artwork for the posters for the movies Henry: Portrait of a Serial Killer and Charles Manson Superstar.

He paints mainly using acrylic on wood panel, using a one-hair brush and viewing his work through jeweler's goggles. The smooth surface of the wood panel allows him to paint to an extraordinary level of microscopic detail. Through this painstaking process, he is able to paint an average of one square-inch a day. Coleman does not make sketches or preparatory drawings of his paintings before embarking on them. The paintings usually begin from one detail and grow almost organically. It takes Coleman between one and four years to complete a single painting.

There is a ritualistic aspect to his work and the process by which he completes it. The frames of his paintings are often decorated with symbols from his own personal iconography to contain the forces within. Sometimes items of clothing or other artifacts related to his subject matter are appended to the painting.

=== Patrons ===
Collectors of his work include Iggy Pop, Johnny Depp, Jim Jarmusch, Leonardo DiCaprio and H.R. Giger.

=== Exhibitions ===
The first exhibitions of Coleman's paintings were held at Lower East Side and Soho art galleries, Wooster, Chronocide, Limbo and Civilian Warfare, in 1986 and 1987. Chronocide's Bob Behrens would become Coleman's first dealer. Victoria and Albert Museum curator David Owsley, whom Coleman had met after picking him up his cab, bought a piece from one of his shows at Chronicide and hung it next to a Breughel in his collection. Owsley would also introduce Coleman to Mickey Cartin, who became the biggest collector of his work and convinced him to stop driving a cab and devote himself to painting full-time. In the late ’80s and early ‘90s, Coleman had solo shows at Psychedelic Solution in Greenwich Village and Billy Shire's gallery, La Luz de Jesus, on Melrose Avenue in Los Angeles. His first European show was held in 1998 at London's The Horse Hospital, formerly a Victorian-era stable to house the sick horses of cab drivers.

In 2006, Coleman had a mid-career retrospective at New York's Jack Tilton Gallery entitled Joe Coleman: 30 Paintings and a Selection from the Odditorium, curated by Steven Holmes. Among those who saw it were French journalist Clement Dirie who arranged for the show to travel to the Palais de Tokyo in Paris, in March 2007, and German curator Susanne Pfeffer, who invited Coleman to exhibit at the K-W Institute for Contemporary Art in Berlin and commissioned David Woodard to pen an essay for the accompanying catalog.

For the K-W Institute show, now entitled Joe Coleman: Internal Digging, Pfeffer expanded the exhibit, to include all aspects of Coleman's work, as a painter, performance artist and also as a curator of the Odditorium, his personal museum. Taking over all four floors of the K-W Institute, visitors entered the show by walking into a cavernous ground floor space occupied by the sights and sounds of the Odditorium, largely housed in three German circus wagons. Each subsequent floor featured a different aspect of Coleman's oeuvre. Musician, actor, and outsider artist Bruno S., the star of Werner Herzog's Stroszek, was personally invited by Coleman to play the dinner following the exhibition's public vernissage. The K-W Institute show is the largest and most comprehensive exhibition to date of Coleman's work. New York's Dickinson Gallery exhibited a number of Coleman's paintings together with paintings by Hans Memling and other 15th century early Netherlandish painters, in a 2008 show entitled Devotio Moderno: Joe Coleman/Northern Primitives, to draw attention to both the devotional aspect and use of religious and a personal iconography in Coleman's paintings. The show included the 1999 painting, The Book of Revelations, which depicted Coleman and his wife Whitney Ward, encircled by a rainbow and riding atop a demon. They are surrounded on either side by friends and family who attended their wedding at the American Visionary Art Museum in Baltimore, while their symbolizing enemies are pitching into the fires of hell below them. The frame of the painting is adorned with blood-stained pages of the Book of Revelation from a miniature bible.

Two years later, in 2010, Dickinson put on a solo show by Joe Coleman, Autoportrait, that included the first public viewing of Doorway To Joe, a life-size self-portrait Coleman had painted over the course of four years. Doorway to Joe was exhibited again, with its companion painting Doorway to Whitney, a life-size portrait of Whitney Ward, completed in 2015, and unveiled at Unrealism, a show of figurative art curated by Jeffrey Deitch and Larry Gagosian at Art Basel Miami in December 2015.

The two paintings also formed the center-piece of another large retrospective of Coleman's work, entitled ''Doorway to Joe'', held in 2017 at the Begovitch Gallery, California State University, Fullerton.

In 2025, gallerist Jeffrey Deitch asked Coleman to curate Carnival, a group show featuring art inspired by carnivals, sideshows, and circuses.

The American Folk Art Museum's 2026 exhibit, Self-Made: A Century of Inventing Artists, featured Coleman's ornate vest as a self-portrait and centerpiece of the exhibit, together with two paintings: Voyage to Candyland (2026) and Devil Anse Hatfield (1996).

== Performance art ==
In the late 1970s Coleman developed a carnival geek/ mad preacher persona for his early performances called Professor Mombooze-o—a name that was an amalgamation of his mother (‘Mom’) and father (‘Booze-0’). Professor Mombooze-o, who was depicted in a 1986 painting, would appear in performance spaces in NY's Lower East Side and, while ranting as a madman preacher, would bite the heads off of live mice and explode on stage.

On October 22, 1989, Coleman staged a performance as Professor Mombooze-o at the Boston Film/Video Foundation (BF/VF). It began with 20 minutes of black and white vintage porn projected onto a screen, at the end of which Coleman burst through the screen hanging upside down on a harness and screaming as fireworks strapped to his chest exploded, like a baby born through a trial of fire and brimstone. After his then-wife Nancy Pivar cut him down, as if cutting the umbilical cord, and extinguished the fire, Coleman ripped the rest of screen apart to reveal a dead goat also hanging upside down. He then pulled two live white mice from his pocket, announcing, 'This is Mommy and Daddy'. He proceeded to bite the head off 'Daddy' and spit it into the audience. Then did the same to 'Mommy', but swallowed the head. "This is Joe Coleman's stone ritualization of his mother's death," a 1990 article in Spin magazine reported about the performance. "Four days earlier, she had died of cancer." Fittingly, this would be the last ever appearance of Professor Mombooze-o.

When police and fireman arrived on the scene, they arrested Coleman, Pivar and BF/VF manager, Jeri Rossi. Coleman was charged under an arcane statute, which had not been used since the 1800s, citing him for "possession of an infernal machine". He was fined $5000 for possessing and exploding fireworks and a further $300 for eating mice. The terms of his probation stipulated that he "not eat any Massachusetts mice for a year".

Since 2017, Coleman has embarked on a series of spoken word performances accompanied by projections of the paintings. These have taken place in June 2017 at Salo Club, Paris, during three nights curated by director and actress, Asia Argento, as part of a show with Lydia Lunch and Weasel Walter's Brutal Measures project at Club Berlin in New York and in November 2017 as part of Le Guess Who? festival in Utrecht, Netherlands.

== Film & Television ==
Alongside his performance art, Joe Coleman has also appeared as an occasional actor, often playing the kind of misfits, outsiders, monsters and murderers who populate his paintings. In the early 1980s while attending the School of Visual Arts, he contributed to several avant-garde films by Manuel DeLanda, as a writer and actor, including Incontinence: A Diarrhetic Flow of Mismatches and Raw Nerves: A Lacanian Thriller.

Coleman appeared in two shorts associated with the Lower East Side film movement, the Cinema of Transgression. playing a serial killer in Jeri Cain Rossi's 1992 short film, Black Hearts Bleed Red, an adaptation of Flannery O'Connor's short story A Good Man Is Hard To Find, and Satan (to Sid Vicious bodyguard Rockets Redglare's portrayal of Jesus) in Tommy Turner and David Wojnarowicz's Where Evil Dwells, based on the 1984 murder of Ricky Kasso.

He played producer Barry Paar, a thinly veiled depiction of Harvey Weinstein, in Asia Argento's 1998 loosely autobiographical directorial debut, Scarlet Diva, in a scene based on her alleged 1997 rape by Weinstein at the Cannes Film Festival.

Coleman had a cameo as John the Baptist in Dan Fogler and Michael Canzoniero's 2014 feature, Don Peyote, a reimagining of Don Quixote as a stoner comedy, alongside a cast that included Anne Hathaway, Annabella Sciorra, Abel Ferrara, Topher Grace and Wallace Shawn.

In 2016 Coleman appeared as the title character in The Cruel Tale of the Medicine Man, alongside contemporary sideshow and burlesque performers including Mat Fraser and Julie Atlas Muz, directed by James Habacker, founder of New York City neo-burlesque venue, The Slipper Room.

He has also appeared in a number of documentaries, including films about two subjects of his paintings, Albert Fish and Carl Panzram. A performance by Professor Mombooze-o was featured in Harvey Nikolai Keith's 1988 documentary Mondo New York, about the NYC underground art and music scene. The film also featured Lydia Lunch, Phoebe Legere, Ann Magnuson, Emilio Cubeiro and Joey Arias.

Coleman was also the subject of R.I.P: Rest in Pieces, a 1999 feature documentary by filmmaker Robert Adrien Pejo. In one of the film's set pieces, he is shown performing an autopsy on a woman performed in Budapest, Hungary under the guidance of medical examiner Janos Keser, and later in the film visiting rockabilly icon, Hasil Adkins, (whom Coleman had previously made the subject of a 1993 painting) in his West Virginia home, and being interviewed by filmmaker Jim Jarmusch in a church.

2001 “Outsider Art /Music” at the Barbican Theatre, London, England presented two films created by Coleman featuring his paintings. The first film called Humanscapes, was accompanied by the music of Carlo Gesualdo, Coleman's favorite medieval composer and performed by a live choir, The Clerk's Group. The second film called Portraits, was accompanied by specially composed music performed live by The Delgados. A similar performance was presented at the Bergen International Festival in 2002 with an original score composed by the Norwegian band, Motorpsycho.

In 2018, Coleman was featured in the final episode, "Lower East Side," of the long running series, Anthony Bourdain: Parts Unknown.

Joe Coleman and his wife, Whitney Ward, are the subjects of a 2025 feature-length documentary film by Scott Gracheff, entitled How Dark My Love.

== Monographs ==
- Cosmic Retribution: The Infernal Art of Joe Coleman by Joe Coleman (Fantagraphics, 1992, paperback, ISBN 0-922915-06-7; Feral House, 1993, hardcover, ISBN 0-922915-13-X).
- The Man of Sorrows by Joe Coleman (Gates of Heck, 1993, hardcover, ISBN 0-9638129-0-4; republished in 1998).
- Original Sin: The Visionary Art of Joe Coleman by Joe Coleman, John Yau, Jim Jarmusch, Harold Schechter, and Katharine Gates (Heck Editions, 1997, paperback, ISBN 0-9638129-6-3). Winner of a 1998 Firecracker Alternative Book Award in the Special Recognition/Wildcard category
- The Book of Joe by Joe Coleman, Anthony Haden-Guest, Katharine Gates, Asia Argento, Rebecca Lieb, and Jack Sargeant (Last Gasp/La Luz de Jesus Press, 2003, hardcover, ISBN 0-86719-578-9).
- Joe Coleman: Internal Digging by Joe Coleman, Susanne Pfeffer, David Woodard, Markus Müller (Walther König, 2008, paperback, ISBN 3-8656028-0-0).
- A Doorway to Joe: The Art of Joe Coleman by Joe Coleman, Mike McGee, Tom Waits (Fantagraphics, 2024, hardcover, ISBN 1683968700).

== Honors ==
- Reigned as King Neptune of the 2024 Coney Island Mermaid Parade.
