= Adam Parfrey =

American writer and editor (1957–2018)

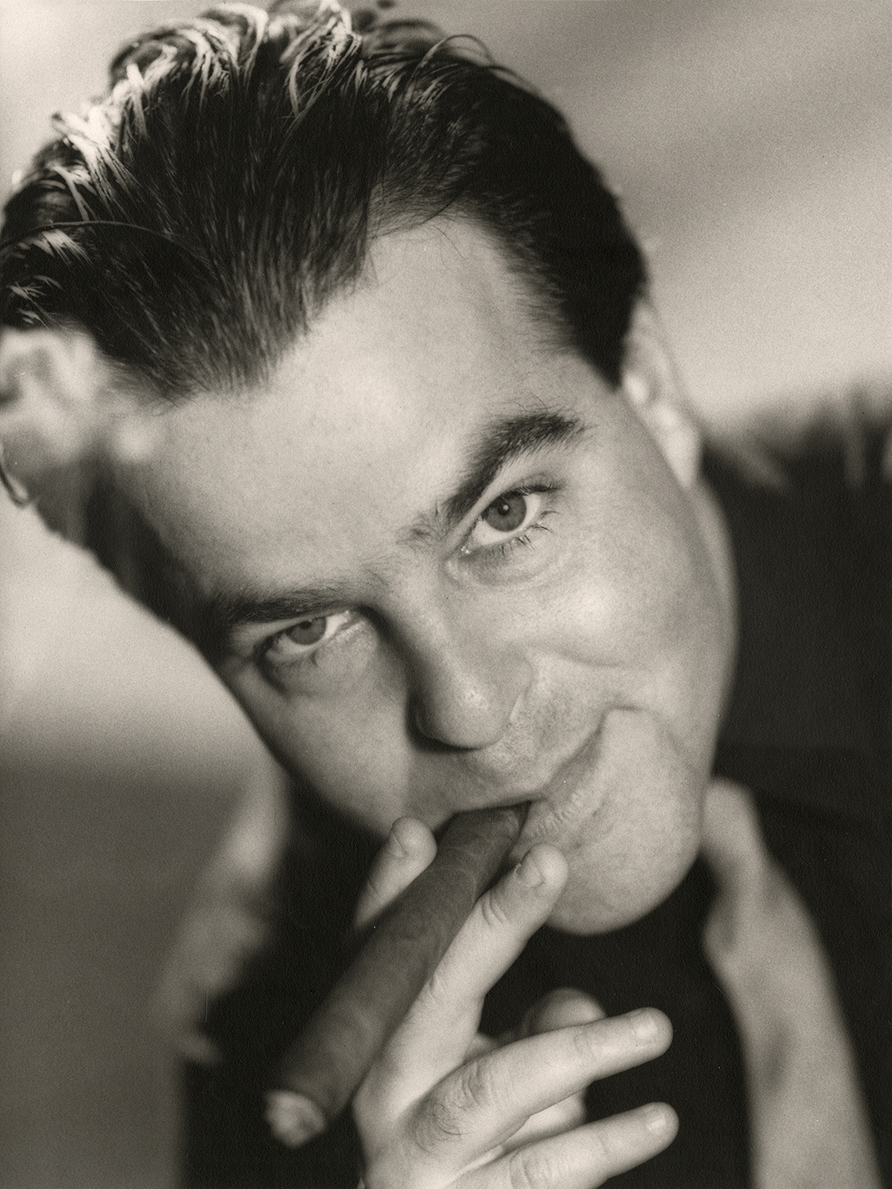
- Undated photo of Parfrey
- Born: April 12, 1957; New York City, U.S.
- Died: May 10, 2018 (aged 61); Seattle, Washington, U.S.
- Occupations: Journalist; editor; author; publisher
- Years active: 1982–2018
- Notable work: Apocalypse Culture
- Spouse: Jodi Wille (m. 2006; div. 2011)
- Parent: Woodrow Parfrey (father)

Adam Parfrey (April 12, 1957 – May 10, 2018) was an American journalist, author, editor, and the publisher of Feral House books, whose work in all three capacities frequently centered on unusual, extreme, or "forbidden" topics. Previously, he was the publisher of several magazines, and another publisher, Amok Press. He also wrote for several magazines and wrote, cowrote, or edited several books, among them Apocalypse Culture.

== Early life ==
Parfrey was born in New York City. During childhood, he moved to Los Angeles with his parents, actor Woodrow Parfrey and Rosa Ellovich, a stage director of Jewish descent. After graduating high school, he attended the University of California, Santa Cruz, and UCLA. He wrote for the UCLA's paper, the Daily Bruin, before dropping out.

== Career ==
After dropping out of UCLA, Parfrey moved to San Francisco, where he began a short-lived experimental magazine, IDEA, in May 1981. That publication folded after two issues. In 1984, with George Petros, Parfrey launched EXIT magazine, which they described as an "outlaw liberal Fascist Sci-Fi Pop Art magazine". Topics in this magazine included serial killers, depraved sexuality, and Nazism. The first issue excerpted Jim Jones and Adolf Hitler.

In 1987, Parfrey and Kenneth Swezey co-founded Amok Press in New York. Amok Press's first title was an English translation by Joachim Neugroschel of the Nazi propagandist Joseph Goebbels's novel Michael (1929), which was reviewed in the New York Times and The New Republic. This was followed by Parfrey's Apocalypse Culture, a collection of articles, interviews, and documents that explore various marginal aspects of culture. Apocalypse Culture was Parfrey's most successful book, selling 100,000 copies by 2010.

Parfrey was one of the members of the Abraxas Foundation, an "occult-fascist" collective made up of Parfrey, Boyd Rice, Nikolas Schreck, and later Michael J. Moynihan. At this time, introduced by William Grimstad, Parfrey met Keith Stimely, with whom he became friends; Stimely was a Holocaust denier and a former member of the Institute for Historical Review.

Parfrey moved back to the west coast and while living in Portland, Oregon, founded another imprint, Feral House, in 1989. The name was suggested by Boyd Rice. The company's first book was The Satanic Witch by Anton LaVey. Parfrey co-wrote many Feral House titles. Stimely sent out a press release saying Parfrey and his publisher, Feral House, had signed to his publicity agency. Parfrey later denied that Stimely had been his publicist and said that he had done so without his permission. In 1994, Parfrey released the album Deep Inside a Cop's Mind on Amphetamine Reptile Records as the musical project S.W.A.T. The album featured Nick Bougas and Jim Goad as vocalists, among others, and focuses on the police as a theme.

In 1998 Parfrey was sued over a book, The Oklahoma City Bombing and the Politics of Terror, authored by investigative reporter David Hoffman, alleging government involvement in the Oklahoma City bombing. As a result of the lawsuit (brought by a former FBI official named in the book), Parfrey had to destroy all remaining copies of the book and issue a statement disavowing its allegations.

In 2005, Parfrey co-founded the publishing company Process Media with Jodi Wille of Dilettante Press.

A 2010 Seattle Weekly profile stated that "what Parfrey does is publish books that explore the marginal aspects of culture. And in many cases—at least back when his interests were almost exclusively transgressive—he sheds light on subjects that society prefers to leave unexplored, carving a niche catering to those of us with an unseemly obsession with life's darkest, most depraved sides."

== Political views ==
Parfrey described himself as "a pot-smoking libertarian." He published authors with a wide range of extremist political views, including fascists and neo-Nazis as well as anarchists, leftists, and liberals. He publicly maintained that he didn't necessarily agree with the viewpoints he published, telling one interviewer in 1995, "Everything the establishment extols as comfortable and right and good makes me sick." In the 1980s he also corresponded with James Mason and other neo-Nazis. In his letters to Mason, he expressed racist views, portraying the non-right-wing books that he published as ideological camouflage. Parfrey frequently pointed to his Jewish ancestry to deflect accusations of fascist sympathies.

== Personal life ==
Parfrey lived in Los Angeles for a time before moving to Port Townsend, Washington, where he lived for the remainder of his life. Parfrey first heard of Port Townsend through the Loompanics publishing house, which was based there. He was married and divorced three times, the last time to his creative collaborator Jodi Wille.

He died in Seattle on May 10, 2018, following complications from a series of strokes.

== Legacy ==
Vice Magazine called Feral House a forerunner to 4chan and Reddit. Feral House books inspired the films Ed Wood, American Hardcore, and Lords of Chaos. The conspiracy literature published by Feral House was also an influence on The X-Files.

Along with his associates Boyd Rice and Michael Moynihan, Parfrey helped popularize James Mason's writings, which found a new audience among neo-Nazis in the 2010s as Siege.

== Awards ==
- Winner: Independent Publisher Awards Best History Book of 2012 Silver Medal: Ritual America: Secret Brotherhoods and Their Influence on America Society, by Adam Parfrey and Craig Heimbichner.

== Works ==
=== Authored ===
- End Is Near!: Visions of Apocalypse, Millennium and Utopia by Stephen Jay Gould, Roger Manley, Adam Parfrey and Dalai Lama, foreword by Rebecca Hoffberger (Dilettante Press, 1998, paperback ISBN 0-9664272-7-0, 1999, hardcover ISBN 0-9664272-6-2)
- Lexicon Devil: The Fast Times and Short Life of Darby Crash and the Germs by Brendan Mullen, Adam Parfrey and Don Bolles (Feral House, 2002, ISBN 0-922915-70-9)
- Two Thousand Formulas, Recipes, and Trade Secrets: The Classic Do-It-Yourself Book of Practical Everyday Chemistry by Harry Bennett and Adam Parfrey (Feral House, 2003, ISBN 0-922915-95-4)
- Sin-a-Rama: Sleaze Sex Paperbacks of the Sixties by B. Astrid Daley, Adam Parfrey and Lydia Lunch (Feral House, 2004, ISBN 1-932595-05-8)
- Secret Source: The Law of Attraction and Its Hermetic Influence Throughout the Ages by Maja D'Aoust, Adam Parfrey and Jodi Wille (Feral House, 2007, ISBN 978-1-934170-07-6)
- —— (2010). Feral Man In A Feral Land: Strange Tales from the Apocalypse Culture. Portland: Feral House. ISBN 978-1-932595-45-1.
- ——; Heinbichner, Craig (2011). Ritual America: Secret Brotherhoods and Their Influence on American Society: A Visual Guide. Portland: Feral House. ISBN 978-1-936239-14-6.
- ——; Nelson, Cletus (2014). Citizen Keane: The Big Lies Behind the Big Eyes. Portland: Feral House. ISBN 978-1-936239-95-5.
- Wyllie, Timothy; ——; Lunch, Lydia; P-Orridge, Genesis Breyer (2015). Propaganda and the Holy Writ of the Process Church of the Final Judgement: Sex Issue, Fear Issue, Death Issue, The Gods on War. Portland: Feral House. ISBN 978-1-936239-10-8.

=== Edited ===
- ——, ed. (1987). Apocalypse Culture. New York: Amok Press. ISBN 0-941693-02-3.
  - ——, ed. (1990). Apocalypse Culture: Revised and Expanded Edition. Portland: Feral House. ISBN 0-922915-05-9.
- Black, Bob; ——, eds. (1989). Rants and Incendiary Tracts. New York: Amok Press/Loompanics Unlimited. ISBN 0-941693-03-1.
- ——, ed. (1995). Cult Rapture: Revelations of the Apocalyptic Mind. Portland: Feral House. ISBN 0-922915-22-9.
- ——, ed. (2000). Apocalypse Culture II. Portland: Feral House. ISBN 0-922915-57-1.
- ——, ed. (2002). Extreme Islam: Anti-American Propaganda of Muslim Fundamentalism. Portland: Feral House. ISBN 0-922915-78-4.
- ——, ed. (2003). It's a Man's World: Men's Adventure Magazines, The Postwar Pulps. Portland: Feral House. ISBN 0-922915-81-4.
- Wyllie, Timothy (2009). —— (ed.). Love, Sex, Fear, Death: The Inside Story of the Process Church of Final Judgment. Portland: Feral House. ISBN 978-1-932595-37-6.

=== Other contributions ===
- Schreck, Nikolas, ed. (1988). The Manson File: The Unexpurgated Charles Manson As Revealed in Letters, Photos, Stories, Songs, Art, Testimony, and Documents. Associate editors are Boyd Rice, Nick Bougas, Jimmi Rocket, John Aes-Nihil, and Jack Stevenson. New York: Amok Press. ISBN 0-941693-04-X. Was compiled by Parfrey, who did not wish to put his name on the work.
  - Aes-Nihil, John; Bougas, Nick; ——; Rice, Boyd; Rocket, Jimmi; Schreck, Nikolas; Stevenson, Jack, eds. (2011). The Manson File: Charles Manson As Revealed in Letters, Photos, Stories, Songs, Art, Testimony and Documents. Port Townsend: Feral House. ISBN 978-1-936239-36-8.
- War Is a Racket: The Anti-War Classic by America's Most Decorated General by Smedley D. Butler, with introduction by Adam Parfrey (reprinted in 2003 by Feral House, ISBN 0-922915-86-5)

== Recordings ==
- S.W.A.T. – Deep Inside a Cop's Mind: The Soundtrack for the Next Police State (Audio CD, 1994, Label: Amphetamine Reptile Records).
- A Sordid Evening of Sonic Sorrows (Audio CD, 1997, Man's Ruin Records MR-066).
- He has also collaborated with Boyd Rice on his album Hatesville.
- He plays the voice of Lord Jehova in the reading of The Gods on War with Genesis Breyer P-Orridge (The Lord Lucifer), Lydia Lunch (The Lord Satan) and Timothy Wyllie (Transcendence).
