= Feral House =

American publishing house

- Refuses to be Domesticated
- Status: Active
- Predecessor: Amok Press
- Founded: 1989
- Founder: Adam Parfrey
- Country of origin: United States
- Headquarters location: Port Townsend, Washington
- Distribution: Consortium Book Sales & Distribution (US, Canada); Turnaround Publisher Services (UK)
- Key people: Jessica Parfrey, Christina Ward
- Imprints: Process Media
- Official website: feralhouse.com

Feral House is an American book publisher founded in 1989 by Adam Parfrey and based in Port Townsend, Washington. Feral House is known for its taboo and provocative publications, but has had significant influence in both underground circles and the mainstream.

== History ==
=== Background ===
Feral House was formed out of the collapse of Adam Parfrey's previous publisher, Amok Press, which Parfrey had founded with Ken Swezey in 1986. After Amok Press collapsed, Swezey founded his own publisher, Blast Books.

On March 30, 1989, Stuart Swezey (Ken Swezey's brother) and Brian King of Amok Books (related to but distinct from Amok Press) wrote a letter to LA Weekly saying that Amok Press was defunct. In response to Stuart Swezey and King, Parfrey and Ken Swezey penned a letter to the LA Weekly that denied they were defunct, and said that Feral House and Blast Books would be imprints of Amok Press. This was not the case and both publishers succeeded Amok Press.

=== Origins ===
Feral House was founded in 1989 by Parfrey in Los Angeles, California. The name was suggested by Boyd Rice. It is now based in Port Townsend, Washington. The company's first book was a 1989 republication of The Satanic Witch by Anton LaVey, the founder of the Church of Satan. This was financially successful for Feral House. The publisher became known for its taboo and strange publications, including the collected works of the Unabomber, works about Charles Manson, and works by serial killers, conspiracy theorists, and neo-Nazis. It published a variety of political extremist material.

In 1996, they attempted to launch Feral House Audio, a release label. Only one recording was ever released, Varg Vikernes's Filosofem. Feral House was sued for publishing a 1998 book about the Oklahoma City bombing. The book accused an FBI official and argued the government had known the attack was going to happen. Parfrey was forced to destroy all copies of the book, apologize, and disavow the theories espoused.

=== After Parfrey's death ===
Following the death of Parfrey in 2018, Feral House continued to be run by Parfrey's sister, Jessica Parfrey, and Christina Ward. In 2021, they put out a call for "writers who identify as Women, People of Color, LGBTQ, and others who have felt excluded from traditional publishing", in an effort to introduce more diverse authors into their lineup.

On February 10, 2026, Feral House announced that Christina Ward had acquired ownership of Feral House and its imprint Process Media. Former owner Jessica Parfrey would step back from day-to-day operations and take on the role of editor-at-large.

== Influence ==
Feral House's motto is "Refuses to be Domesticated". Feral House became a significant company in several underground circles, but soon developed mainstream influence as well. Their books have inspired several mainstream films. Tim Burton's film Ed Wood was based upon the Feral House title, Nightmare of Ecstasy: The Life and Art of Edward D. Wood Jr. Burton's 2014 film Big Eyes was also based on a Feral House book. The Feral House title American Hardcore: A Tribal History by Steven Blush has been made into a feature documentary of the same name, released by Sony Classics in the fall of 2006. The 2018 film Lords of Chaos was also based on a Feral House publication.
