= Raw & Alive: The Seeds in Concert at Merlin's Music Box =

Studio album by The Seeds
- Released: May 1968
- Recorded: April 1968, Western Recorders, Hollywood, California
- Genre: Garage rock; psychedelic rock; proto-punk
- Length: 41:08
- Label: GNP Crescendo
- Producer: Marcus Tybalt, Neil Norman

The Seeds chronology
A Full Spoon of Seedy Blues (1967)	Raw & Alive: The Seeds in Concert at Merlin's Music Box (1968)	Fallin' Off the Edge (1977)

Singles from Raw & Alive: The Seeds in Concert at Merlin's Music Box
- 1. "Satisfy You" Released: May 1968

Raw & Alive: The Seeds in Concert at Merlin's Music Box is the fifth album by the American garage rock band, the Seeds, and was released on GNP Crescendo in May 1968 (see 1968 in music). It was marketed as a live album recorded at Merlin's Music Box, although all the album's contents were actually completed live-in-studio with audience noise overdubbed. The album marks a return to the band's energetic punk sound that previously garnered them national acclaim. Upon release, however, the album and its accompanying single "Satisfy You" failed to chart, making it their final album. The group would eventually disband in 1972.

== Background ==
The Seeds came to national prominence, albeit briefly, with hit singles such as "Can't Seem to Make You Mine" and "Pushin' Too Hard", which made them front-runners in the development of garage rock and garage-psych. However, the group's psychedelic concept album Future saw the band attempt to create a more sophisticated sound, while its successor, the blues-orientated A Full Spoon of Seedy Blues, completely missed the national charts. By 1968, the Seeds had all but been forgotten outside their loyal following in California; as a result, they fired their long-time manager Lord Tim Hudson and sought a way to return to past fortunes.

== Recording ==
The Seeds attempted to utilize both the simplicity of lyrical and instrumental arrangements of their first two albums and the psychedelia exemplified on Future for their next album. In early 1968, the group entered Western Recorders, in Hollywood, rather than the coffeehouse they occasionally performed in that is mentioned in the album title, with record producer Neil Norman co-producing. The band's original plan was to replicate the vitality of their live performances, with relatively basic and stripped-down recording methods and an in-studio audience. However, the Seeds recognized at the conclusion of the recording sessions that the dynamics of an actual concert were lacking and the material was scrapped. Though none of the recordings were featured on Raw & Alive, they later appeared on a reissue of the album on Big Beat Records in 2014, with the previously unreleased track, "Hubbly Bubbly Love", included.

In April 1968, the band reconvened with the same concept, but without an audience present. Still, Raw & Alive had the sound of a live album with an introduction by Merlin's Music Box's local disc jockey, "Humble" Harv Miller, lead vocalist Sky Saxon making his traditional dedication of the song, "Pushin' Too Hard", to "society", and crowd noises overdubbed into place. Five of the 11 tracks, including "Pushin' Too Hard", "Can't Seem to Make You Mine", "Mr. Farmer", "No Escape", and "Up in Her Room", were all re-recorded renditions of previously released Seeds songs, though "Up in Her Room" is five minutes shorter than the original version on A Web of Sound. Among the album's new material, the arguably best-known composition is the organ-driven "900 Million People Daily (All Making Love)", which is seen as a return to the lengthy instrumental jams highlighted on past releases. For Raw & Alive, the song was shortened to five minutes, but the full-length version was eventually released on the compilation album, Travel with Your Mind.

== Release ==
Professional ratings
Review scores
Source	Rating
Uncut	4/5 stars

Upon release, Raw & Alive failed to chart nationally. The accompanying single, "Satisfy You", also was commercially unsuccessful. The band's lineup began to unravel with Saxon continuing with variations of the group until its first disbandment in 1972. At first, the album's status of being recorded live went unchallenged until versions of "Satisfy You", "Pushin' Too Hard", and "900 Million People Daily (All Making Love)" without the crowd noises were released on the 1993 compilation album Travel With Your Mind. The alternate take of "Pushin' Too Hard" was actually first issued on the 1977 album, Fallin' off the Edge, but was listed as a "rehearsal". No reissue has a full setlist without audience applause, despite demand for such a release.

== Track listing ==
=== Side one ===
1. "Introduction by 'Humble' Harv" - 0:20
2. "Mr. Farmer" (Sky Saxon) - 3:50
3. "No Escape" (Jan Savage) - 2:25
4. "Satisfy You" (Savage) - 2:00
5. "Night Time Girl" (Saxon) - 2:30
6. "Up in Her Room" (Daryl Hooper) - 9:45

=== Side two ===
1. "Gypsy Plays His Drums" (Hooper) - 4:30
2. "Can't Seem to Make You Mine" (Saxon) - 2:30
3. "Mumble and Bumble" (Saxon) - 2:25
4. "Forest Outside Your Door" (Saxon) - 2:40
5. "900 Million People Daily (All Making Love)" (Saxon) - 4:50
6. "Pushin' Too Hard" (Saxon) - 2:40

== Personnel ==
- Sky Saxon - lead vocals, bass guitar, harmonica
- Jan Savage - lead guitar, gong, backing vocals
- Harvey Sharpe - bass guitar
- Daryl Hooper - organ, piano
- Rick Andridge - drums, backing vocals
