= Evil Hoodoo =

Compilation album by The Seeds
- Released: 1988
- Recorded: 1966–1969
- Genre: Garage rock; psychedelic rock; proto-punk
- Length: 46:52
- Label: Bam-Caruso
- Producer: Brian Hogg

The Seeds chronology
Bad Part of Town (1982)	Evil Hoodoo (1988)	Travel with Your Mind (1993)

Evil Hoodoo is a compilation album by the American garage rock band the Seeds, and was released by Bam-Caruso Records, in 1988. Somewhat relatable to a greatest hits album, Evil Hoodoo did not issue any unreleased tracks by the group; however, it did introduce listeners to the Seeds' music as underground psychedelic rock and garage rock musical genres were being rediscovered.

The album focuses on the Seeds' garage rock and proto-punk releases, completely bypassing their flirtation with the blues on the group's fourth studio album A Full Spoon of Seedy Blues. Nationally charting hits featured on Evil Hoodoo includes "Pushin' Too Hard" (number 36), "Can't Seem to Make You Mine" (number 41), and "Mr. Farmer" (number 86). Perhaps the rarest recordings on the album are "Fallin' Off the Edge (Of My Mind)" and "Chocolate River", both of which received their first LP release on the 1977 compilation Fallin' Off the Edge. "Fallin' Off the Edge (Of My Mind)" is a 1969 single release, and "Chocolate River" was recorded during the A Web of Sound sessions, but never appeared on the album.

Released in 1988, Evil Hoodoo helped revitalize the Seeds' music, as young collectors began discovering once-obscured psychedelic and garage rock musical artists from the 1960s. The vinyl version of the album utilized an image of the band which was used once before on the compilation New Fruit from Old Seeds: The Rare Sky Saxon, Volume One. A release on the compact disc format featured a common publicity photo of the Seeds posing in a greenhouse in 1967. In addition, releases with pictured-discs were issued in a limited 1,000-copy run. Despite the fact that Evil Hoodoo remains the only legitimate attempt at a Seeds greatest hits collection, it has remained out-of-print since 1995.

== Track listing ==
=== Side one ===
1. "March of the Flower Children" - 2:54
2. "The Wind Blows Your Hair" - 2:31
3. "Tripmaker" - 2:48
4. "Try to Understand" - 2:53
5. "Evil Hoodoo" - 5:15
6. "Chocolate River" - 3:14
7. "Pushin' Too Hard" - 2:37
8. "Fallin' Off the Edge (Of My Mind)" - 2:54

=== Side two ===
1. "Mr. Farmer" - 2:52
2. "Up in Her Room" - 2:42
3. "Can't Seem to Make You Mine" - 3:02
4. "Pictures and Designs" - 2:43
5. "Flower Lady and Her Assistant" - 3:32
6. "Rollin' Machine" - 2:32
7. "Out of the Question" - 2:16
8. "Satisfy You" - 2:07
