= A Thousand Shadows =

Single by The Seeds

from the album Future
- B-side: "March of the Flower Children"
- Released: June 1967
- Recorded: 1967
- Length: 2:25
- Label: GNP Crescendo
- Songwriter(s): Sky Saxon, Daryl Hooper, Jan Savage
- Producer(s): Marcus Tybalt

The Seeds singles chronology
"Can't Seem to Make You Mine" (1967)	"A Thousand Shadows" (1967)	"The Wind Blows Your Hair" (1967)

"A Thousand Shadows" (sometimes written "1000 Shadows") is a song by American rock group The Seeds, written by vocalist Sky Saxon, keyboardist Daryl Hooper, and guitarist Jan Savage. Produced by Marcus Tybalt, it was released as a single in 1967 and peaked at number 72 on the U.S. Billboard Hot 100 chart.

== Background and release ==
The Seeds premiered "A Thousand Shadows" during a March 1967 performance at the Daisy club in Beverly Hills, California. In June, the song was released as the lead single from the band's third album, Future. The single came in a pink sleeve adorned with gray four-leaf clovers outlining a negative photograph of the band members next to a sign that says "Wishing Well - Help Us Grow."

== Reception ==
A review of "A Thousand Shadows" in a June 1967 issue of Billboard magazine stated "with the flower theme throughout, this smooth rhythm entry [is] well written, performed and produced." Joe Viglione of Allmusic wrote that the song's melody and feel were similar to those of the band's earlier single "Pushin' Too Hard". Music historian Domenic Priore described the lyrics to "A Thousand Shadows" as "ambitious (but never ambiguous)" and said "the music retains the taut incision of 1950s rock 'n' roll." The single spent four weeks on the Billboard Hot 100 chart and peaked at number 72. It reached number 86 on the U.S. Cash Box Top 100 chart.

== Track listing ==
7" Vinyl

No.	Title	Writer(s)	Length
1.	"A Thousand Shadows"	Sky Saxon, Daryl Hooper, Jan Savage	2:25
2.	"March of the Flower Children"	Saxon, Hooper	1:45

== Chart performance ==
Chart (1967)	Peak position
U.S. Billboard Hot 100	72
U.S. Cash Box Top 100	86
