= A Full Spoon of Seedy Blues =

Studio album by The Seeds
- Released: November 1967
- Recorded: August 12 – October 14, 1966
- Genre: Blues rock
- Length: 31:56
- Label: GNP Crescendo
- Producer: Marcus Tybalt

The Seeds chronology
Future (1967)	A Full Spoon of Seedy Blues (1967)	Raw & Alive: The Seeds in Concert at Merlin's Music Box (1968)

Professional ratings
Review scores
Source	Rating
Uncut	1/5 stars

A Full Spoon of Seedy Blues is the fourth album by the American garage rock band, the Seeds, credited to the Sky Saxon Blues Band, and released on GNP Crescendo in November 1967 (see 1967 in music). The album saw the group take a completely different and controversial direction from the psychedelia featured on their previous effort, Future, towards a style rooted in blues. However, the results of the venture were ill-received, both commercially and within their loyal fanbase.

Recording sessions actually began not long after the Seeds completed their second album, A Web of Sound, but a release was postponed as the group was enjoying belated commercial success from the re-release of two singles from their debut album, which was issued in April 1966. A Full Spoon of Seedy Blues saw members of Muddy Waters' band, which included harmonica player George "Harmonica" Smith, saxophonist James Wells Gordon, and guitarists Luther "Guitar Junior" Johnson and Mark Arnold work with the group. Additionally, Johnson contributed the two compositions, "Pretty Girl" and "One More Time Blues", plus a cover version of the Waters-penned "Plain Spoken". Though the album was credited to the Sky Saxon Blues Band, there were no lineup changes from the personnel on their first three albums. The Seeds removed themselves from their hard-edge take on garage rock and psychedelia, replacing it with a relaxed blues sound. To that effect, A Full Spoon of Seedy Blues was the first and only Seeds album to not include a rendition of the guitar riff found in the group's hit song, "Pushin' Too Hard".

Upon release, A Full Spoon of Seedy Blues failed to chart on the Billboard 200 and damaged the band's image, which marked a decline in their commercial success. The lack of album sales is primarily attributed to its blues-oriented material being released in a year when psychedelic music was at the peak of its popularity. The album has yet to see its own individual compact disc reissue and its contents are rarely available on compilation albums, but it was re-released with the Seeds' third album, Future, on June 12, 2001. In 2013, in order to flesh out more tracks, Big Beat Records' distribution of A Web of Sound included a mono mix of A Full Spoon of Seedy Blues.

== Track listing ==
=== Side one ===
1. "Pretty Girl" (Luther "Guitar Junior" Johnson) - 1:58
2. "Moth and the Flame" (Sky Saxon) - 3:47
3. "I'll Help You (Carry Your Money to the Bank)" (Saxon) - 3:27
4. "Cry Wolf" (Saxon) - 6:04
5. "Plain Spoken" (Muddy Waters) - 2:52

=== Side two ===
1. "The Gardener" (Saxon) - 4:57
2. "One More Time Blues" (Johnson) - 2:25
3. "Creepin' About" (Saxon) - 2:43
4. "Buzzin' Around" (Saxon) - 3:43

== Personnel ==
- Sky Saxon - lead vocals, bass guitar, harmonica
- Jan Savage - lead guitar, gong, backing vocals
- Harvey Sharpe - bass guitar
- Daryl Hooper - organ, piano
- Rick Andridge - drums, backing vocals
- Luther "Guitar Junior" Johnson - guitar
- Mark Arnold - guitar
- George "Harmonica" Smith - harmonica
- James Wells Gordon - saxophone
