= Plastic Crimewave =

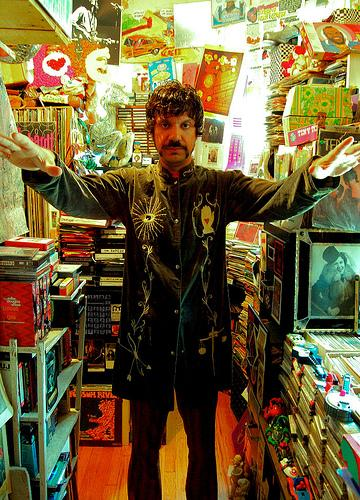
- Plastic Crimewave in his lair.

Background information
- Also known as: Plastic Crimewave
- Born: Steven H. Krakow; September 30, 1973 (age 53); Chicago, Illinois, United States
- Genres: Psychedelic, experimental music, acid punk, progressive rock, stoner rock, lo-fi, drone music, freak folk
- Occupations: Musician, illustrator, music historian, writer, impresario
- Instruments: Guitar, vocals, banjo
- Years active: 1995–present
- Labels: Drag City; Galactic Zoo Disk; Eclipse Records/Prophase
- Website: plasticcrimewave.com

Plastic Crimewave (born Steven H. Krakow), otherwise known as Steve Krakow, is a Chicago-based illustrator and writer, avant-garde musician, music historian and impresario. He is the editor of Drag City-published magazine Galactic Zoo Dossier, eponymous front man for Plastic Crimewave Syndicate and co-member of Spiral Galaxy, founder of the Million Tongues Festival, and Vision Celestial Guitarkestra. He writes and illustrates the "Secret History of Chicago Music" comic in the Chicago Reader and co-hosts WGN-AM's Secret History of Chicago Music series. He runs the Drag City imprint label, Galactic Zoo Disk and Guerssen records imprint Galactic Zoo Archive.

== Biography ==
Crimewave was born in Chicago, Illinois and raised in Des Plaines and Hoffman Estates, Illinois. As a child, Kraków took an interest in comics such as Doctor Strange, Krazy Kat and Winsor McCay's "Little Nemo." Showing artistic promise, he began priming for a comics career in early adolescence. While enrolled at University of Illinois at Urbana-Champaign, Crimewave discovered Pink Floyd's "Interstellar Overdrive" and space rock group, Hawkwind, and began drawing and designing concert posters. His comics background and rapidly burgeoning preoccupation with psychedelic culture led to the first issue of Galactic Zoo Dossier magazine. His alias, Plastic Crimewave, pays homage to Canadian psychedelic band, The Plastic Cloud, Daredevil villain Crimewave, and post-Tea Set Pink Floyd incarnation, The Pink Floyd Sound.

== Career ==
Crimewave has been called a modern guru of psychedelic art, music and culture of the 1960s and 1970s, as well as a "freelance mind-wizard". Regarding his artwork and music, British musician and musicologist Julian Cope has called Crimewave, among other things, "a Futuretro freak", while Crimewave himself says he pulls inspiration from the "vibrationally bizarre.".

=== Writing and illustration ===
==== Galactic Zoo Dossier ====
Originating in 1995, Galactic Zoo Dossier is a magazine hand-drawn by Plastic Crimewave, and currently published by independent label Drag City. The magazine, often called a "psychedelic bible" is highly regarded for its extensive coverage of psychedelic arcana and historically champions esoteric, or "cult" musicians, as well as misunderstood mainstream artists of the 1960s and 1970s. Actual cult musicians, Ya Ho Wha 13, have also been featured. Past contributors include Michael Karoli, The Bevis Frond, Devendra Banhart and other notable musicians and writers. The magazine takes its name from the Kingdom Come album.

Some of the musicians Crimewave has interviewed for GZD include Arthur Brown, John Renbourn, Clive Palmer of Incredible String Band, Simeon of Silver Apples, Michael Karoli and Damo Suzuki of Can, Vashti Bunyan, Peter Daltrey of Kaleidoscope, Judy Dyble of Fairport Convention, Martin Carthy, Sixto Rodriguez, Dick Taylor of The Pretty Things, Pip Proud, Dave Lambert of The Strawbs, Simon Finn, Susan Jacks and Craig McCaw of The Poppy Family and Michael Rother of Neu!, Edgar Broughton, Judy Dyble, Jesse Hector, Peter Daltrey of Kaleidoscope, etc.

==== Secret History of Chicago Music ====
The Secret History of Chicago Music is Crimewave's hand-lettered and illustrated newspaper column that appears in the Chicago Reader. It covers "pivotal Chicago musicians that somehow have not gotten their just dues," and is a semimonthly feature in the newspaper. The column runs in coordination with WGN's Secret History of Chicago Music segment on The Nick Digilio Show, in which Crimewave takes listener phone calls related to the featured musician. On occasion, the featured musicians will call in.

In November 2015, Curbside Splendor published a compendium of more than a decade of Secret History strips called My Kind of Sound. Pitchfork Media's Jessica Hopper described My Kind of Sound as "an education even for us know-it-all music obsessives, and are the only comics that have sent me directly to the record store to dig in the bins for dusty gems."

==== Other ====
Crimewave has written or currently writes for Arthur Magazine, Stop Smiling, Roctober, Time Out Chicago, Seattle's The Red Telephone, Big City Rhythm and Blues Magazine and podcasts for Anthology Recordings. He has given lectures at Stop Smiling headquarters.

=== Music ===
==== Plastic Crimewave Sound ====
Crimewave's band, Plastic Crimewave Sound, was a psychedelic acid punk band based in Chicago. The band consisted of Plastic Crimewave, bassist Mark Lux (Raspberry Kidd), drummer Lawrence Peters (Skog Device), Steve's brother Adam (Hands of Hydra) on second guitar. They toured with Acid Mothers Temple, Comets on Fire, Oneida, The Ponys, The Gris Gris, Marble Sheep and others, and played at the Terrastock festival and international festivals. The band has been compared to Chrome, Can, Ya Ho Wha 13, Sonic Youth, Hawkwind and has a cult following. After Plastic Crimewave Sound disbanded, Kraków formed a power trio, Plastic Crimewave Syndicate, with Anjru Kieterang (bass) and Karissa Talanian (drums), now Jose Bernal (drums).

==== Million Tongues Festival ====
Crimewave curates the celebrated Million Tongues Festival in Chicago. The annual music festival includes international folk artists, experimental and underground, often featuring "cult" artists from the 1960s, 1970s and 1980s. Now in its fifth year, the fest has seen performances by Bert Jansch, Peter Walker, Michael Chapman, LSD March, Michael Yonkers, Simon Finn, Plastic Boner Band, and Terry Reid, among others. Crimewave took the festival name from a line in Clive's Original Band's, "Song of Ages."

==== Vision Celestial Guitarkestra ====
Inspired by experimental 1960s music ensemble Scratch Orchestra, free-jazz musician Alan Silva's Celestial Communication Orchestra and Glenn Branca's guitar symphonies, Crimewave has organized many "Guitarkestras," featuring an orchestra of up to 100 seasoned and novice volunteer guitarists. It has been called an "art-freak happening" and "overwhelming sonic assault". Crimewave loosely conducts the performances, typically encouraging the guitar orchestra to play in the key of E. Crimewave says E is "the closest chord to 'Om'".

==== Galactic Zoo Disk ====
Crimewave runs the Galactic Zoo Disk imprint label under Drag City, which has reissued or released archival releases by JT IV, The George-Edwards Group, Ryan Trevor, Ed Askew, Sandy Bull, Midnight, Michael Yonkers, Spur, and others. Crimewave also has the roving imprint Galactic Zoo Archive which has co-released LPs by Simply Saucer, Ono, Bil Vermette, and Red Square.

==== Moonrises, Etc. ====
Plastic Crimewave played in progressive avant-garde trio Moonrises. Their 1st s/t LP was released by Logan Hardware and their sophomore LP was released on Captcha Records in February 2013.

Past Crimewave duos include Solar Fox, Goldblood, Black Hole and Scum Ra.

== Personal collection ==
Crimewave is a noted collector of vintage pop culture paraphernalia. His apartment has been called a "personal museum", with over 7,000 LPs, 30,000 comics, around 2,000 45s, a 1967 Seeburg jukebox, action figures, advertisements and psychedelic concert posters. He describes the decor as having "a '60s-freakout vibe."

== Visual art exhibitions ==
- Galactic Zoo Dossier: A Retrospective, Soccer Club Club 2016
- Secret History of Chicago Music, Corbett Vs Dempsey 2016
- "UBS 12x12: Steve Krakow," The Museum of Contemporary Art, Chicago 2010
- "Art of Touring" group show, Johalla Projects, Chicago 2010
- "Cake White Palace" group show, Texas Ballroom, Chicago 2004
- "Pathway To Unknown Worlds: Sun Ra" group show, Hyde Park Art Center, Chicago 2006
- "Harry Smith Remixed" group show, Alt Gallery, Newcastle, England 2007
- "Frock 'N' Roll" group show, Local Project Gallery, New York 2007
- "Invoking" group show, Bucketrider Gallery, Chicago 2007

== Discography ==
=== Albums ===
- 2002 Grade Ceased 45 (Captain Spazz)
- 2003 Michael Yonkers/Plastic Crimewave Sound split 45 (Captain Spazz)
- 2003 Splendor Mystic Solis-Heavy Acid Blowout tensions (Galactic Zoo Disk/Eclipse)
- 2004 Plastic Crimewave Sound-Flashing Open (Eclipse/Rocket)
- 2005 Plastic Crimewave Sound/Oneida split 12" (Jagjaguwar/Brah)
- 2006 Plastic Crimewave Sound-No Wonderland (Eclipse/Prophase)
- 2006 Plastic Crimewave Solo—Howling Light 45 (Loud Devices)
- 2008 Plastic Crimewave Sound-S/T (Eclipse/Prophase)
- 2008 Plastic Crimewave Sound-Painted Shadows (A Silent Place)
- 2009 Plastic Crimewave Sound/Michael Yonkers--"Bleed Out" (Spiral Staircase)
- 2009 Plastic Crimewave Sound "Shockwave Rider" 45 (Hozac)
- 2011 Djin Aquarian & Plastic Crimewave Sound "Save The World" (Prophase Music)
- 2012 Moonrises "s/t" (Logan Hardware)
- 2013 Moonrises "Frozen Altars" (Captcha)
- 2014 Plastic Crimewave vs Speed Guru of Acid Mothers Temple comic and soundtrack (Prophase Music)
- 2014 Plastic Crimewave Sound "The Oblivion Programme" (Priority Male)
- 2014 Plastic Crimewave Syndicate "The Golden Cage" (Priority Male)
- 2015 Plastic Crimewave Syndicate "s/t" (Swordfish)

=== Compilations ===
- 2000 The Unshown—Wigs on Fire! B-52s tribute (Nihilist Records)
- 2001 The Unshown—Galactic Zoo Dossier No. 5 compilation (Drag City)
- 2002 Plastic Crimewave Sound—ABBA Tribute (Nihilist Records)
- 2003 Utopia Carcrash/Moleculad/Plastic Crimewave—Galactic Zoo Compendium compilation (Drag City)
- 2004 Plastic Crimewave Sound—Million Tongues (Bastet)
- 2004 Plastic Crimewave Sound—Galactic Zoo Dossier No. 6 compilation (Drag City)
- 2005 Plastic Crimewave Sound—In Demons In! 10" (Rocket)
- 2007 Plastic Crimewave Sound—Phosphene River (Jamnation)
- 2007 Plastic Crimewave Sound—Galactic Zoo Dossier No. 7 compilation (Drag City)
- 2008 Plastic Crimewave Sound--WFMU Free Music Archive Sampler No. 2 (WFMU)

=== Underground ===
- 1996 Phantom Channel-Flexible Viking Supernova (Jagged Time Lapse)
- 1996 Plastic Crimewave—Broken Back Opera (Jagged Time Lapse)
- 1997 King Hell II—S/T (Jagged Time Lapse)
- 1997 Utopia Carcrash-S/T (Jagged Time Lapse)
- 1998 Utopia Carcrash-Drowned World EP (Jagged Time Lapse)
- 1998 Utopia Carcrash-Breakdown Communication EP (Jagged Time Lapse)
- 1998 Utopia Carcrash-Double Live Mega Blistering Acid Freak-Out Pile-Up (No Label)
- 1999 The Unshown-S/T (No Label)
- 1999 The Unshown-SuperAcidNoiseCult Sessions (Jagged Time Lapse)
- 2000 Plastic Crimewave—Projection (Galactic Zoo Disk)
- 2000 Plastic Crimewave—Gradually Darkens (Galactic Zoo Disk)
- 2000 Plastic Crimewave, Utopia Carcrash, King Hell II—La Musica Box Set (La Musica)
- 2001 Plastic Crimewave and the Fake—Live at the Hideout (Galactic Zoo Disk)
- 2002 Plastic Crimewave and the Fake—Rising Anger EP (Galactic Zoo Disk)
- 2002 Plastic Crimewave, Utopia Carcrash, King Hell II—Freakout Revisited Box Set (Galactic Zoo Disk)
- 2003 Plastic Crimewave Sound—Live Boombox Explosions (Galactic Zoo Disk)
- 2004 Black Hole—S/T (Galactic Zoo Disk)
- 2004 Plastic Crimewave—Blinding Pink Sun (Galactic Zoo Disk)
- 2004 Plastic Crimewave—Live in Osaka (Galactic Zoo Disk)
- 2005 Plastic Crimewave and Heady Friends—Collapserations (Galactic Zoo Disk)
- 2005 Plastic Crimewave and Heady Friends—Collapserations II (Galactic Zoo Disk)
- 2006 Plastic Crimewave—Black Rust Loops- (Galactic Zoo Disk)
- 2006 Plastic Crimewave—Burning Phoenix Rise- (Galactic Zoo Disk)
- 2008 Plastic Crimewave Sound—Dark Debris- (Galactic Zoo Disk)
- 2008 Plastic Crimewave Expanse-Le Sorciere (Apollolaan)
- 2009 Sir Plastic Crimewave-Bait/Switch Banjo Ragas/Rags (As Above So Below)
- 2009 Plastic Crimewave Sound/Djin Aquarian-Live Yod Devotions (PlusTapes)
- 2009 Plastic Crimewave-Fire in the Whole (Apollolaan)
- 2010 Sir Plastic Crimewave-From the Depths (Sloow Tapes)
- 2010 Sir Plastic Crimewave-String/Soul/Eye (Kendra Steiner Editions)
- 2014 Solar Fox "Infinity Rituals" (Medusa)
- 2016 Werewheels "Live, Raw and Psycho in Japan"(Kendra Steiner Editions)
