= Almost Famous (soundtrack) =

2000 film soundtrack album

Soundtrack album from Almost Famous by various artists
- Released: September 12, 2000
- Genre: Folk rock; hard rock; pop rock; progressive rock; progressive pop; psychedelic rock; blues rock; southern rock; soft rock; southern soul
- Length: 70:41
- Label: DreamWorks
- Producer: Danny Bramson & Cameron Crowe

Professional ratings
Review scores
Source	Rating
AllMusic	4/5 stars

Almost Famous is the soundtrack album to the film of the same name, released in 2000. It was awarded the 2001 Grammy Award for Best Compilation Soundtrack Album for a Motion Picture, Television or Other Visual Media.

In May 2021, UMe announced the reissue of the soundtrack as an expanded five CD/seven LP boxed set. It was the first time all of the music featured in the film was released in one set.

== Track listing ==
No.	Title	Writer(s)	Artist	Length
1.	"America"	Paul Simon	Simon & Garfunkel	3:36
2.	"Sparks"	Pete Townshend	The Who	3:48
3.	"It Wouldn't Have Made Any Difference"	Todd Rundgren	Todd Rundgren	3:51
4.	"I've Seen All Good People: Your Move"	Chris Squire, Jon Anderson	Yes	3:33
5.	"Feel Flows"	Carl Wilson, Jack Rieley	The Beach Boys	4:43
6.	"Fever Dog"	Nancy Wilson	Stillwater	3:10
7.	"Every Picture Tells a Story"	Rod Stewart, Ron Wood	Rod Stewart	5:55
8.	"Mr. Farmer"	Sky Saxon	The Seeds	2:51
9.	"One Way Out" (live)	Elmore James, Marshall Sehorn, Sonny Boy Williamson II	The Allman Brothers Band	4:57
10.	"Simple Man"	Gary Rossington, Ronnie Van Zant	Lynyrd Skynyrd	5:56
11.	"That's the Way"	Jimmy Page, Robert Plant	Led Zeppelin	5:37
12.	"Tiny Dancer"	Elton John, Bernie Taupin	Elton John	6:15
13.	"Lucky Trumble"	Nancy Wilson	Nancy Wilson	2:40
14.	"I'm Waiting for the Man" (from Live Santa Monica '72)	Lou Reed	David Bowie	5:43
15.	"The Wind"	Cat Stevens	Cat Stevens	1:40
16.	"Slip Away"	William Armstrong, Marcus Lewis Daniel, Wilbur Terrell	Clarence Carter	2:32
17.	"Something in the Air"	Speedy Keen	Thunderclap Newman	3:54

== Personnel ==
=== Stillwater ===
- Billy Crudup ("Russell Hammond") – lead guitar
- Jason Lee ("Jeff Bebe") – lead singer
- John Fedevich ("Ed Vallencourt") – drums
- Mark Kozelek ("Larry Fellows") – bass guitar

=== Musicians ===
- Peter Frampton
- Mike McCready
- Jon Bayless
- Ben Smith
- Gordon Kennedy
- Marti Frederiksen – vocals

== Additional music ==
Other music used in the film did not appear on the soundtrack album. As with the songs in the released soundtrack, they are usually snippets of a minute or less.

- Alvin and the Chipmunks: "The Chipmunk Song (Christmas Don't Be Late)"
- Brenton Wood: "The Oogum Boogum Song"
- The Stooges: "Search and Destroy"
- Black Sabbath: "Paranoid"
- Jethro Tull: "Teacher"
- Yes: "Roundabout"
- Joni Mitchell: "River"
- Black Sabbath: "Sweet Leaf"
- Nancy Wilson: "Cabin in the Air"
- Little Feat: "Easy to Slip"
- Raspberries: "Go All the Way"
- Stillwater: "Hour of Need"
- The Guess Who: "Albert Flasher"
- Stillwater: "Love Thing"
- Neil Young and Crazy Horse: "Everybody Knows This Is Nowhere"
- Fleetwood Mac: "Future Games"
- Deep Purple: "Burn"
- Stillwater: "You Had to Be There"
- Blodwyn Pig: "Dear Jill"
- Steely Dan: "Reelin' in the Years"
- MC5: "Looking at You"
- Stillwater: "Love Comes and Goes"
- The Jimi Hendrix Experience: "Voodoo Child (Slight Return)"
- Free: "Wishing Well"
- Buddy Holly and The Crickets: "Peggy Sue" #
- Dr. Hook & The Medicine Show: "The Cover of "Rolling Stone"" #
- Elton John: "Mona Lisas and Mad Hatters"
- Stevie Wonder: "My Cherie Amour"
- Chicago: "Colour My World" #
- Neil Young: "Cortez the Killer" (live recording from the Paramount Theater in Oakland, California on 20 March 1999)
- Led Zeppelin: "The Rain Song"
- Led Zeppelin: "Bron-Yr-Aur"
- Led Zeppelin: "Tangerine"
- Led Zeppelin: "Misty Mountain Hop"
- Stillwater: "Chance Upon You" @
- Pete Droge and Elaine Summers: "Small Time Blues" # Portraying Gram Parsons and Emmylou Harris at the Riot House Hotel

# Sung or performed by a character in the film
@ Only featured in the director's cut, Untitled

== Charts ==
=== Weekly charts ===
Weekly chart performance for Almost Famous
Chart (2000–2001)	Peak position
Australian Albums (ARIA)	19
Austrian Albums (Ö3 Austria)	68
German Albums (Offizielle Top 100)	65
US Billboard 200	43
US Top Soundtrack Albums (Billboard)	16

=== Year-end charts ===
Year-end chart performance for Almost Famous
Chart (2001)	Position
Canadian Albums (Nielsen SoundScan)	163

== Certifications ==
Region	Certification	Certified units/sales
Canada (Music Canada)	Gold	50,000^{^}
United States (RIAA)	Gold	500,000^{^}
^{^} Shipments figures based on certification alone.
