= Jodi Wille =

American filmmaker and book editor

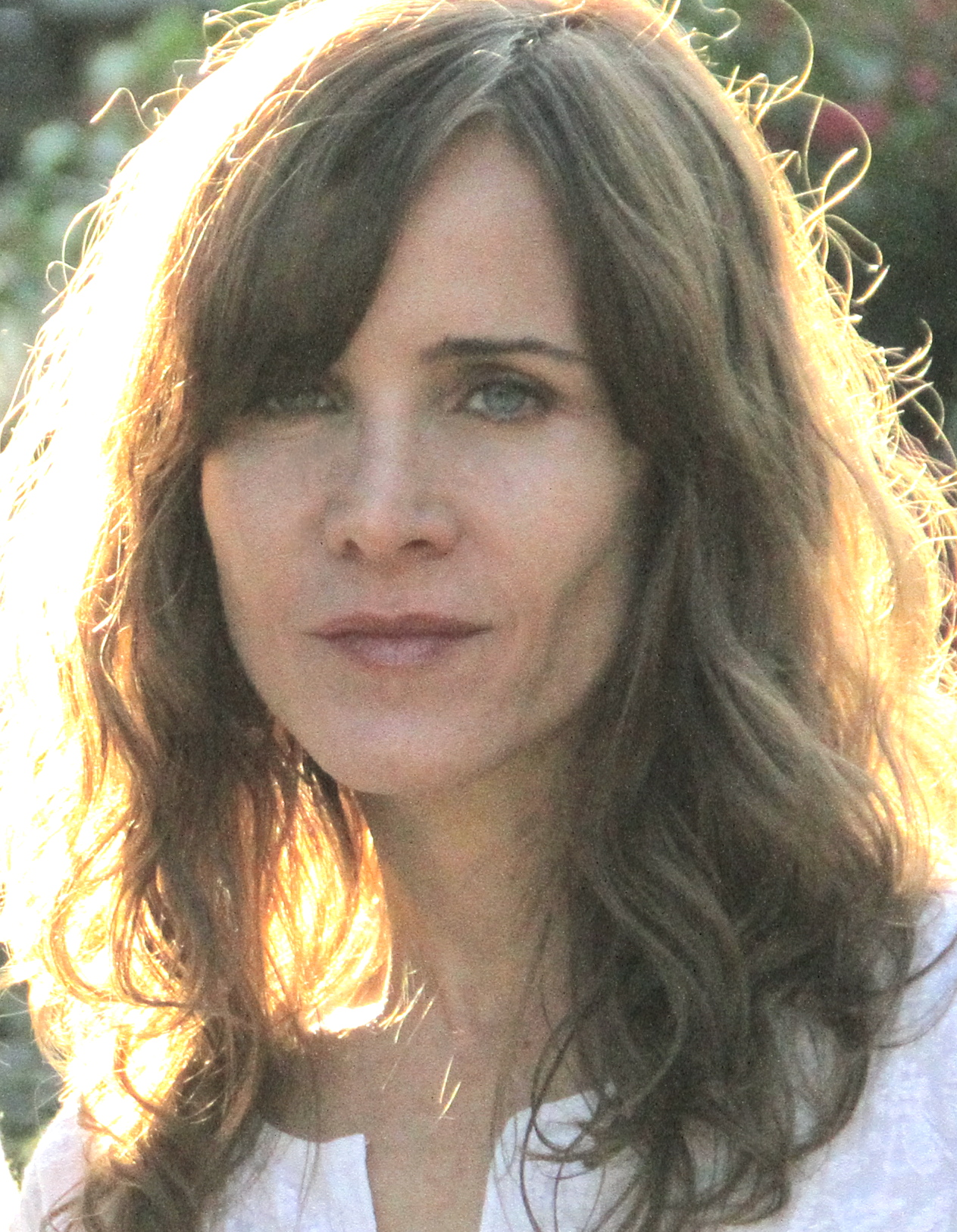
- Wille in 2014
- Occupations: Film director, curator, and book publisher
- Known for: Co-founder of Dilettante Press and Process Media

Jodi Wille is an American film director, curator, and book publisher known for her work exploring American subcultures.

== Filmmaking and photography ==
Wille directed and produced The Source Family (2012), her first feature-length documentary, with Maria Demopoulos. The film explores the story of the eponymous Los Angeles utopian commune and its charismatic leader, Father Yod. The Source Family premiered in competition at South by Southwest Film Festival and screened in competition at several major film festivals. The film was released theatrically to 60 cities in May 2013.

Wille's second film, Welcome Space Brothers (2023), is a feature documentary about the Unarius Academy of Science, an extraterrestrial-channeling spiritual school and self-healing community in Southern California that in the late 70s became a prolific filmmaking collective under the direction of outlandish spiritual leader Ruth Norman, AKA Archangel Uriel. The film's executive producers include Elijah Wood and Phil Lord and Christopher Miller. Welcome Space Brothers premiered in November 2023 at Beyond Fest, the largest genre film festival in the United States. The film was the first feature documentary ever to world premiere at the festival. The film premiered internationally at Melbourne International Film Festival in August of 2024.

In 1994, R.E.M. gave Wille her first paid directing gig for their "Find the River" music video. Signed to DNA (David Naylor & Associates), she directed a number of music videos in the mid-90s. Wille worked prior to that as assistant to music video and commercial director Samuel Bayer and later as assistant and development consultant to feature film director Roland Joffé.

Throughout the 1990s, Wille also worked as a commercial and documentary photographer, shooting billboard campaigns, rock bands and personalities including Sparks, Melissa Etheridge, and Vincent Gallo, while also documenting visionary artists and alternative spiritual communities.

== Book publishing ==
In 1998, Wille co-founded Dilettante Press with Steve Nalepa, Nick Rubenstein, and Hedi El Kholti, a publishing house with a focus on self-taught, visionary, and vernacular art and photography. Dilettante published only three titles, but "their impact was considerable." Dilettante produced exhibitions, symposiums, and parties related to their books in galleries and museums in multiple cities in the U.S. and in Europe.

In 2005, Wille founded Process Media with her then-partner (later, husband) Adam Parfrey of Feral House. The imprint focuses on non-fiction, literary memoirs, and illustrated books exploring subcultures and groundbreaking artists such as Andy Kaufman, Roky Erickson and the 13th Floor Elevators, John Sinclair and MC5, Father Yod and Ya Ho Wha 13, and Moondog. Process has also created a "Self-Reliance Series" of illustrated guide books that promote sustainable and self-sufficient living.

== Curating ==
In 2000, Wille, Hedi El Kholti, and Cheryl Dunn co-curated the first exhibition of the work of amateur photographer Gary Lee Boas, Starstruck: Photographs from Fan, at Deitch Projects. This led to exhibitions at galleries and museums in the U.S. and throughout Europe, including Yerba Buena Center for the Arts in San Francisco, The Photographers' Gallery in London, and Galerie Kamel Mennour in Paris.

In 2013, Wille was named as co-curator with Rebecca Alban Hoffberger of the American Visionary Art Museum exhibition The Visionary Experience: St. Francis to Finster, a 44-artist, 244-works exhibition which ran 2014–2015.

Since 2014, Wille has curated several exhibitions of photographs, art, costumes, and ephemera produced by the extraterrestrial-channeling spiritual school Unarius Academy of Science, including a 2016 exhibition at the London arts venue The Horse Hospital, works in The Visionary Experience exhibition at American Visionary Art Museum, a 2016 exhibition at The Standard Hotel Hollywood, and at the 2017 Basilisk exhibition at Nicodim Gallery in Los Angeles.

== Film programming and cultural events ==
Over the years, Wille has programmed films and curated cultural events in several cities. From 2007 to 2017, Wille served as a regular guest programmer at The Cinefamily cinematheque in Los Angeles, hosting programs including an eclectic range of guests from Kris Kristofferson, Tony Clifton, Roky Erickson, and Tom Laughlin to white witches, Hare Krishnas, and Bigfoot researchers, as well as live music, ritual performance, panels, and art exhibitions.

In 2015, Wille presented a retrospective of the films of the Unarius Academy of Science at Cinefamily, which included a Unariun art and artifact exhibition and Unariun workshops. This led to invitations to present Unarius films at the 2015 San Francisco International Film Festival and the Horse Hospital arts center in London.

== Selected works ==
=== Film ===
- The Source Family (2012, 98 mins.), directed with Maria Demopoulos
- We Are Not Alone (2016, 11 mins.)
- Welcome Space Brothers (2023, 100 mins.)

=== Music videos (selected works) ===
- R.E.M. - "Find the River" (1994)
- The Meices - "Daddy's Gone to California" (4/14/94)
- Wool - "Kill the Crow" (5/10/94) also producer
- Local H - "Cynic" (2/3/95) also editor
- Jennifer Trynin - "Happier" (1995)
- Hot Damn - "My Panties Are Too Tight" (7/30/96)

=== Publishing and editing (select works) ===
- Family: The Source Family Scrapbook by Isis Aquarian, Charlie Kitchings, and Jodi Wille (Sacred Bones and Otherworld Press), 2023.
- Starstruck: Photographs from a Fan by Gary Lee Boas. Foreword by Michael Musto. Afterword by Carlo McCormick. Edited by Jodi Wille, Photo Editor: Hedi El Kholti (Dilettante Press, 2000).
- Gary Lee Boas: New York Sex 1979–1985. Essay by Bruce Hainley, edited by Hedi El Kholti and Jodi Wille (text editor). (Editions Kamel Mennour, 2003).
- Go Ask Ogre: Letters from a Deathrock Cutter by Jolene Siana, edited by Jodi Wille (Process Media, 2005).
- Sex Machines: Photographs and Interviews by Timothy Archibald, edited by Jodi Wille (Process Media, 2005).
- The Source: The Untold Story of Father Yod, Ya Ho Wa 13, and The Source Family by Isis Aquarian and Electricity Aquarian. Introduction by Erik Davis. Edited by Jodi Wille (Process Media, 2007).
- Pure Country: The Leon Kagarise Archives 1961–1971 by Leon Kagarise. Essays by Eddie Dean and Robert Gordon, edited by Jodi Wille (Process Media, 2008).
- Master of the Mysteries: The Life of Manly Palmer Hall by Louis Sahagun, edited by Jodi Wille (Process Media, 2008).
- Dear Andy Kaufman, I Hate Your Guts! by Lynne Margullies, edited by Jodi Wille and Lissi Erwin (Process Media, 2009).

== Awards ==
- Welcome Space Brothers - Best Historical Documentary, Oregon Independent Film Festival
- Welcome Space Brothers - Honorable Mention Award, Chicago Underground Film Festival
- Dear Andy Kaufman, I Hate Your Guts! (Process Media) Gold Medal, Best Popular Culture Book, 2010 Independent Book Awards
- The Source: The Untold Story of Father Yod, Ya Ho Wa 13, and the Source Family (Process Media), Bronze: Best Popular Culture Book, 2008 Independent Book Awards
- Sex Machines: Photographs and Interviews (Process Media), Winner: Best Book on Sexuality/Relationships, 2006 Independent Publisher Awards
- Starstruck: Photographs from a Fan (Dilettante Press) included in Artforum's "Best of 2000" issue (Boas image on cover).
- Go Ask Ogre: Letters from a Deathrock Cutter (Process Media), Finalist: Best Juvenile/Teen Young Adult Non-fiction, 2006 Independent Publisher Awards
- The End is Near! Visions of Apocalypse, Millennium and Utopia (Dilettante Press), Winner: Benjamin Franklin Award for Best First Book, 1998
