= Fallin' Off the Edge =

Compilation album by The Seeds
- Released: 1977
- Recorded: 1967–1969
- Genre: Garage rock; psychedelic rock; proto-punk
- Length: 30:15
- Label: GNP Crescendo
- Producer: Kim Fowley

The Seeds chronology
Raw & Alive: The Seeds in Concert at Merlin's Music Box (1968)	Fallin' Off the Edge (1977)	Bad Part of Town (1982)

Fallin' Off the Edge is a compilation album by the American garage rock band the Seeds, and was released on GNP Crescendo, in 1977. The first album of its kind to compile Seeds music, Fallin' Off the Edge includes rarities of the group's catalogue, alternate takes, and unreleased tracks. Among the songs available include the 1968 version of the hit "Pushin' Too Hard" without studio-created crowd noises, which was originally the closing track to the fake live album Raw & Alive: The Seeds in Concert at Merlin's Music Box. Although other Seeds compilations have been released over the years, Fallin' Off the Edge remains a collector's item and has been reissued.

Among the non-album songs from singles, include the opening track, "The Wind Blows Your Hair", which was originally released in 1967. Others that make an appearance are the B-side to the first release of "Can't Seem to Make You Mine", "Daisy Mae", "The Other Place", and "Fallin' Off the Edge of My Mind", which was the Seeds' last single for GNP Crescendo. Oddly enough, however, the final single's B-side, "Wild Blood", is not featured on the compilation. Previously unreleased recordings include "She's Gone", "Chocolate River", and an alternate version of "The Wind Blows Your Hair" (called "Reprise"), with different, more frightening lyrics. Fallin' Off the Edge also marked the first time that the version of "Pushin' Too Hard", dubbed a "rehearsal", from the fake live album Raw & Alive: The Seeds in Concert at Merlin's Music Box was released without the studio audience noises. The tune was originally an alternative to the Seeds' hit, recorded in 1967.

Despite other more extensive Seeds compilations emerging over the years, Fallin' Off the Edge remains a sought-after collector's item. The album was first re-released in 1980, and has since been issued on cassette in 1987, but has yet to appear on compact disc format as other band releases have been converted. Most songs on Fallin' Off the Edge, however, are also available on Evil Hoodoo and Travel with Your Mind, which are found on CDs.

== Track listing ==
=== Side one ===
1. "The Wind Blows Your Hair" - 2:30
2. "The Other Place" - 2:22
3. "She's Wrong" - 2:12
4. "Nobody Spoil My Fun" - 3:50
5. "Fallin' Off the Edge (Of My Mind)" - 2:50

=== Side two ===
1. "Pretty Girl" - 2:03
2. "Tripmaker" - 2:45
3. "Chocolate River" - 3:10
4. "Daisy Mae" - 1:50
5. "Wind Blows Your Hair (Reprise)" - 3:08
6. "Pushin' Too Hard" - 2:35
