= Future (The Seeds album) =

Studio album by The Seeds
- Released: August 1967
- Recorded: Gold Star Studios, Hollywood, California November 3, 1966 - May 12, 1967
- Genre: Psychedelic rock
- Length: 40:00
- Label: GNP Crescendo
- Producer: Marcus Tybalt

The Seeds chronology
| A Web of Sound (1966) | Future (1967) | A Full Spoon of Seedy Blues (1967) |

Future is the third studio album by Los Angeles rock band the Seeds. The album is a notable shift in musical direction for the band as they moved away from garage rock, and began experimenting more with psychedelic rock. Upon its release in 1967, the album reached the Top 100 on the Billboard 200, but its single, "A Thousand Shadows", was less successful than The Seeds' previous hits.

== Background ==
The Seeds moved into 1967 as an established band with minor national hits, including "Pushin' Too Hard" and two albums solidifying their individual sound. "Pushin' Too Hard" had not charted on its initial November 1965 release but a July 1966 re-release finally began climbing the Billboard Hot 100 in November, just as sessions for the new album began. With their new manager, Lord Tim Hudson, and a knack for outlandish live performances, the band's public profile was at an all-time high as they embarked on their first national tour and TV appearances. The band went into recording sessions hoping to capitalize on their new success and create a more sophisticated sound. The previous album A Web of Sound had pioneered a garage-based psychedelic style but it had been limited to the group's basic instrumentation; for their next release the band wished to expand their sound with the addition of many exotic new instruments, perhaps inspired by the recent trend on albums such as Aftermath and Revolver.

== Songs and recording ==
Recording sessions began in Gold Star Studios on November 3, 1966, just a few weeks after the completion of A Full Spoon of Seedy Blues, which would not see release until after Future. The first recorded track, "Travel With Your Mind", was the only one complete in 1966, beginning with a basic track of bass, drums, and 12-string guitars upon which doubled organ, tremelo guitar, cymbals and lead vocal were added later that day. The recording had a raga-rock sound with lyrics Saxon related to those in jails or mental hospitals who, despite being locked up, could still go anywhere with their mind. After this recording session, the group embarked on their first national tour and did not re-enter the studio until January 16, 1967 when they began what was to be the opening track, "March of the Flower Children". This marked a dramatic departure from the group's trademark garage rock sound, as it had a lighter, whimsical flower child approach marked by horns, harpsichord, vari-speeded backing vocals and even a whip cracked by Saxon himself. On January 29 the group recorded the similarly themed "Flower Lady and Her Assistant" with added vibes and percussion, the outtake "Sad and Alone" and an anti-drug track called "Rides Too Long".

"Pushin' Too Hard" peaked at #36 on the Billboard chart in February, with the follow up single "Mr. Farmer" also entering the Hot 100. The record label was eager for product but because the new sessions were still underway, another single from 1965, "Can't Seem To Make You Mine" was re-released as a stopgap measure and also performed well, peaking at #41 that spring. The song, however, gave audiences an impression of the group which was fast becoming outdated. On February 3, "Two Fingers Pointin' On You" (a reference to the peace sign) was recorded; although it was a simpler song in the group's older garage style, a harpsichord was added to the mix. On March 3 the group continued work on "Rides Too Long", now retitled "A Thousand Shadows" with drum work by noted session player Hal Blaine. GNP Crescendo Records executive Gene Norman had asked for another song to sound like "Pushin' Too Hard", although some members of the group later felt it was too contrived.

After six more weeks touring, a series of concentrated sessions were held in late April to complete the album. On April 17, Saxon asked for a tuba to be added to both "March of the Flower Children" and "Two Fingers Pointin' On You". On the next day, the social commentary number "Where Is the Entrance Way to Play" was recorded with Tjay Cantrelli of Love adding a flute part and Daryl Hooper overdubbing xylophone. On the 19th, a string quartet arranged by Hooper accompanied the band on the flower ballad "Painted Doll", and on the 20th, Saxon brought in friends and roadies to watch him sing the psychedelic "Six Dreams" on a carpet with incense. On April 24 two new songs, "Chocolate River" and "Now I'm A Man" (originally named "Contact High"), were attempted but the former was left on the cutting room floor, with Daryl playing a 12-string Rickenbacker on the latter. By May 2, with pressure to complete the album at its height, the closing number "Fallin'" was cut completely live with vocals, with guest musician Cantrelli alternating between clarinet and harmonica. On May 3, 8, and 12 there were overdubs of tabla to "Travel With Your Mind", sitar and gong to "Six Dreams", and harp to "March of the Flower Children" and "Fallin'", as well as the spoken word intro to the album which lends it a concept feel. One more song was needed for the album but in spite of "Sad and Alone" and "Chocolate River" being available, it was decided that an old 1965 B-side, "Out of the Question", be added instead, which contrasted greatly with the elaborate production of the rest of the album. Final mixing was done on May 12.

The staff of BrooklynVegan assessed, "Much like Love were doing, [The Seeds] wanted to experiment with baroque orchestration and classical structures mixed with their garage bent." Compared to past material, the band established a complexity in their instrumentals as there was more overdubbing involved in the process. Each song took an increased amount of takes to find cohesion with the overdubbing. Saxon had embraced the psychedelic scene in the band's own take on the genre, with new instrumentation more prominent in the recordings including the piano, trumpet, harp, sitar, flute, oboe, harpsichord and percussion. Although Saxon, under the pseudonym Marcus Tybalt, is solely credited with production, in the liner notes to the album's reissue Daryl Hooper claims that it was more of a band effort, as he had done most of the arrangements.

Professional ratings
Review scores
| Source | Rating |
|---|---|
| AllMusic | 3/5 stars |
| Uncut | 3/5 stars |

== Release and reception ==
Future was released in August 1967 on the GNP label and reached moderate chart success when it peaked at number 87 on the Billboard 200. The album's lead single, "A Thousand Shadows", fared better than "Mr. Farmer" but still only reached number 72 on the Billboard Hot 100. Future was the last Seeds album to chart nationally, and, despite its moderate success, has been unfavored by some. In retrospect, Hooper felt the band might have been evolving too quickly for their audience, especially since older singles were being re-released at the same time. Critics directed their disappointment at the album's similarities to The Beatles' Sgt. Pepper's Lonely Hearts Club Band, although The Seeds began recording months before that album could potentially influence their work. In 2013, Future was re-released on the Big Beats label featuring outtakes, alternate versions, and extensive liner notes by Alec Palao.

In retrospect, the staff of BrooklynVegan wrote, "Future is a mish mash of a record. Sometimes it works and sometimes it goes nowhere. But when it works, it’s a gem." In another mixed assessment, Fred Thomas at AllMusic concluded "While the sidesteps into Technicolor psychedelia and overly serious orchestration are interesting and sometimes good, nothing has quite the same power as Saxon's feral howls or the burning fuzz guitar that escapes in the least calculated (and most exciting) moments of Future.

== Track listing ==
1. "Introduction"/"March of the Flower Children" - [two separate tracks on some CDs] (Saxon, Hooper)
2. "Travel with Your Mind" (Saxon, Hooper, Savage)
3. "Out of the Question" (Saxon, Serpent)
4. "Painted Doll" (Saxon)
5. "Flower Lady and Her Assistant" (Saxon)
6. "Now a Man" (Saxon, Hooper, Savage)
7. "A Thousand Shadows" (Saxon, Hooper, Savage)
8. "Two Fingers Pointin' on You" (Saxon)
9. "Where Is the Entrance Way to Play" (Saxon)
10. "Six Dreams" (Saxon)
11. "Fallin'" (Saxon, Hooper)

=== 2013 bonus tracks ===
Disc One: mono mixes

1. "Chocolate River" - [mono]
2. "Sad and Alone" - [mono]
3. "The Wind Blows Your Hair" (version 2) - [mono]
4. "Travel with Your Mind" - [mono]
5. "Painted Doll" - [mono]
6. "Flower Lady and Her Assistant" - [mono]
7. "Now a Man" - [mono]
8. "Two Fingers Pointing on You" - [mono]
9. "Where Is the Entrance Way to Play" - [mono]
10. "Six Dreams" (alternate mix) - [mono]
11. "Fallin'" - [mono]
12. "The Navy Swings" - [mono]

Disc Two: Contact High — Outtakes from the Future Sessions

1. "Rides Too Long"
2. "Chocolate River"
3. "Flower Lady and Her Assistant" (take 1)
4. "Where Is the Entrance Way to Play" (alternate mix)
5. "Sad and Alone"
6. "Contact High" (take 1)
7. "Travel With Your Mind" (alternate mix)
8. "Six Dreams" (take 4)
9. "Two Fingers Pointing on You" (take 1)
10. "The Wind Blows Your Hair" (version 2)
11. "March of the Flower Children" (alternate mix)
12. "A Thousand Shadows" (take 7)
13. "Gypsy Plays His Drums" (version 1)
14. "Satisfy You" (version 1)
15. "900 Million People Daily All Making Love" (full length version)

== Personnel ==
- Sky Saxon - lead vocals, bass guitar, cover, artwork
- Jan Savage - lead guitar, gong, backing vocals
- Harvey Sharpe - bass guitar
- Daryl Hooper - organ, sitar, piano, backing vocals
- Rick Andridge - drums, backing vocals

Additional personnel

- Hal Blaine - drums
- Tjay Cantrelli - flute, clarinet, harmonica
- Sidney Sharp - violin
- Leonard Malarsky - violin
- Harry Hyarms - viola
- Jesse Urlich - cello
- George Callender - tuba
- Peter Christ - oboe
- Gale Levant - harp
- Doc Siegel - engineer
