= Spires That in the Sunset Rise =

American psychedelic folk band

- Origin: Decatur, Illinois
- Genres: Experimental, psychedelic folk
- Years active: 2004–present
- Labels: eclipse-records/Galactic Zoo Dossier, Secret Eye, Graveface Records, Hairy Spider Legs, Alt-Vinyl
- Members: Ka Baird, Taralie Peterson
- Past members: Tracy Peterson, Georgia Vallas

Spires That in the Sunset Rise is an American psychedelic folk band from Decatur, Illinois. The four original members of the band (Ka Baird, Georgia Vallas, Taralie Peterson, and Tracy Peterson) grew up together in Decatur, Illinois, eventually moving to Chicago, Illinois where they began to experiment with creating songs. Drawing from experimental and multi-cultural music, they created an individual sound which they debuted on their first self-titled album Spires That in the Sunset Rise. The first album was created without Taralie's sister Tracy Peterson, but she soon joined the group before the making of their second album 'Four Winds the Walker.' A year later they created their third album 'This Is Fire' which today is considered one of their most accessible albums thus far. Since the release of their first album, they have contributed a different slant to the New Folk movement by incorporating avant garde influences resulting in a unique sound. Their music has drawn comparisons to The Raincoats, Current 93, Comus, and The Ex, and they have toured throughout the United States, Canada, and Europe.

In 2012, the band (now a duo of long-term members Ka Baird and Taralie Peterson) released their fifth full-length album, Ancient Patience Wills It Again. Subsequent releases included Beasts in the Garden (2015) and Psychic Oscillations (2020).

On August 15, 2024, the early lineup of Ka Baird, Taralie Peterson, Georgia Vallas, and Tracy Peterson reunited along with percussionist Michael Zerang to perform a set for the Million Tongues Festival at the Empty Bottle in Chicago.

== The band ==
- Ka Baird: Lead vocals #1, spike fiddle, acoustic guitar, mbira, slide guitar, harmonium, electric guitar, organ, xylophone, percussion, drums, banjo
- Taralie Peterson: Lead vocals #2, vocals, slide guitar, lap harp, bowed banjo, spike fiddle, cello, banjo, mbira, zither, electric guitar
- Georgia Vallas (former member): Back-up vocals, autoharp, percussion, lap banjo, slide guitar, recorder, zither, bowed banjo, Turkish lap banjo, harmonium, drums, lap slide
- Tracy Peterson (former member): Back-up vocals, percussion, guitar, cello, little harp, drums, mbira, thumb piano, washboard, rattlers, tambourine

== Discography ==
- Spires That in the Sunset Rise (Graveface Records, 2004)
- Four Winds the Walker (Secret Eye, 2005)
- This Is Fire (Secret Eye, 2006)
- Curse the Traced Bird (Secret Eye, 2008)
- Ancient Patience Wills It Again (Hairy Spider Legs, 2012)
- Ancient Patience Wills It Again Part 2 (Hairy Spider Legs, 2012)
- Mirror Cave (Perfect Wave, 2014)
- Beasts in the Garden (Alt Vinyl, 2015)
- Kata Physin (With Michael Zerang, No Index, 2016)
- Illinois Glossolalia (With Michael Zerang, Feeding Tube Records, 2017)
- House Ecstatic (Monofonus Press, Astral Spirits, 2019)
- Psychic Oscillations (FPE Records, 2020)
