= Simon Finn =

Simon Finn may refer to:

- Simon Finn (politician), Australian Labor Party politician
- Simon Finn (musician), English psych rock musician
