= The Source Family =

- Film poster
- Directed by: Jodi Wille and Maria Demopoulos
- Starring: Father Yod, Ya Ho Wa 13
- Distributed by: Drag City
- Release date: March 11, 2012 (SXSW)
- Running time: 98 minutes
- Country: United States
- Language: English

The Source Family is a 2012 feature documentary film directed by Jodi Wille and Maria Demopoulos which recounts the story of Father Yod, Ya Ho Wa 13 and the Source Family. Much material was gleaned from the group's official documentarian and one of Father Yod's wives, Isis Aquarian. Her archives provided photos, diary, film, cassette tapes of Yod's morning class, lost music tapes, graphics; along with input interviews of Source family members and people who knew Jim Baker (Father Yod) and / or went to the Source Restaurant.

The film premiered in competition at South by Southwest Film Festival 2012 and screened at festivals Silverdocs, Seattle International Film Festival and San Francisco International Film Festival, with special screenings at True/False Festival "Boonedawdle" and Hot Docs Canadian International Documentary Festival "Doc Soup" series.

In May 2013, the film was released theatrically, premiering at IFC Center in New York City, where its run was extended for over a month. The film screened in 60 cities and had extended runs in Los Angeles, Portland, San Francisco, and Nashville. It is distributed by Drag City and Gravitas Ventures.

The Source Family provides a view of the group through their own archival photos, home movies, audio recordings, and contemporary interviews with members of the family. Serving as a highly personal, insider's guide to the counter-culture movement of the early 70s, the film is inspired by the cult-classic book The Source: The Story of Father Yod, Ya Ho Wa 13, and The Source Family (Process Media), which was written by Isis Aquarian and Electricity Aquarian and edited by director Jodi Wille.

The documentary features music by Yo Ha Wa, the band composed of members of the Source Family with Father Yod as lead singer.
