= Dog Commune =

American group of hippies and church

- Formation: Late 1960s
- Founders: Sky Saxon and others
- Type: Group of hippies; Psychedelic church
- Purpose: Worship and liberate dogs
- Website: Los Angeles, California

The Dog Commune was an American group of hippies and a psychedelic church who are said to have worshipped dogs. Through visions elicited by the use of LSD, they came to believe that all life had equal value and that God existed on Earth in the form of dogs (with it noted that "dog" spelled backwards is "god"). In addition, they believed that all human problems were caused by the mistreatment of dogs. Members of the commune adopted and herded dogs, raided animal shelters to free dogs, and were reportedly among the first animal rights groups in the United States to try to stop the use of dogs in scientific research. The Dog Commune formed in the late 1960s in Los Angeles, California. It is said to have been an offshoot of the Universal Life Church. One of its founders is said to have been the rock and roll musician Sky Saxon of the psychedelic rock band The Seeds. The group is said to have been one of the more outlandish religions formed in the late 1960s.

== See also ==
- Psychedelic church
