= Sky Saxon =

American singer (1937–2009)

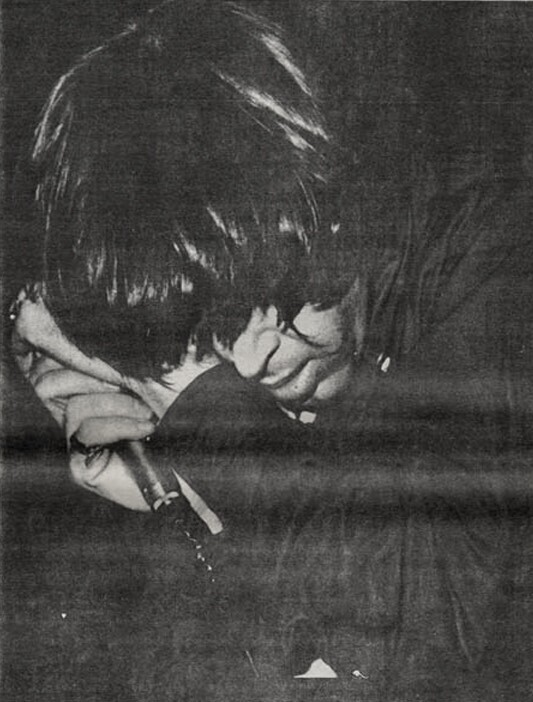
- Saxon performing with The Seeds in 1967

Background information
- Also known as: Little Richie Marsh
- Born: Richard Elvern Marsh; August 20, 1937; Salt Lake City, Utah, U.S.
- Died: June 25, 2009 (aged 71) Austin, Texas, U.S.
- Genres: Rock; psychedelic rock; garage rock; acid rock; proto-punk
- Occupations: Singer; musician; songwriter
- Instruments: Vocals; bass guitar
- Years active: 1962–2009
- Formerly of: The Seeds
- Website: skysunlightsaxon.com

Sky "Sunlight" Saxon (born Richard Elvern Marsh; August 20, 1937 – June 25, 2009) was an American rock and roll musician best known as the leader and singer of the 1960s Los Angeles psychedelic garage rock band The Seeds.

== Early life ==
Saxon was born Richard Elvern Marsh in Salt Lake City, Utah, on August 20, 1937. Different sources suggest a birth year of either 1937 or 1945. His widow has said that his birthday was August 20, but would not confirm the year because he believed age was irrelevant. However, 1940 census records indicate he was born in Utah in 1937. Saxon was raised in a Mormon household on Salt Lake City's west side, spending much of his childhood in Glendale and Rose Park. He later attended West High School.

== Career ==
Saxon began his career performing doo-wop pop tunes in the early 1960s under the name Little Richie Marsh. After changing his name to Sky Saxon, he formed the Electra-Fires in 1962 and then Sky Saxon & the Soul Rockers. Several of these early songs were collected on a 1983 album on AIP called New Fruit from Old Seeds / The Rare Sky Saxon, Volume One.

In 1965, Saxon founded the psychedelic flower power band The Seeds with Jan Savage (guitar), Rick Andridge (drums), and Darryl Hooper (keyboards). Hit songs for Saxon and the Seeds included "Can't Seem to Make You Mine", "Mr. Farmer", and "Pushin' Too Hard," which was a Top 40 hit in 1967. Saxon's singing performance was dismissed by critic Lester Bangs as an American imitation of Mick Jagger, while Michael Hicks considered it a more complicated synthesis of Jagger, Eddie Cochran, and Buddy Holly. The music on the Seeds 1966 albums The Seeds (GNP Crescendo 2023) and A Web of Sound (GNP Crescendo 2033) has been described as "weird psychotic blues highlighting Sky's demented, vocal sermonizing."

A spinoff project, The Sky Saxon Blues Band, recorded one album, A Full Spoon of Seedy Blues, (GNP Crescendo 2040) with members of Muddy Waters' band. At the same time, Saxon continued The Seeds, recording Future (GNP Crescendo 2038) and Raw & Alive: The Seeds in Concert at Merlin's Music Box (GNP Crescendo 2043). Later, in 1977 producer Neil Norman compiled and released Fallin' Off the Edge (GNP Crescendo 2107), an album containing rare "B" sides and unissued material.

"Pushin' Too Hard" was named one of The Rock and Roll Hall of Fame's 500 Songs that Shaped Rock and Roll.

=== After The Seeds ===
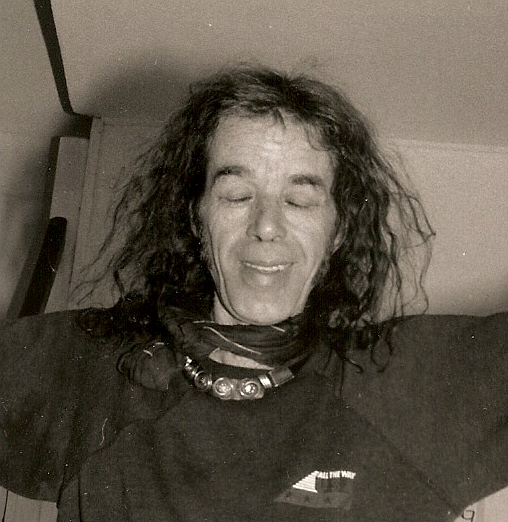
Saxon in 1989

In the 1970s, Saxon continued to work on the music scene, releasing a number of singles and a few independently released albums, often using the name Sky Sunlight Saxon, the New Seeds, or variations thereupon. His 1977 EP is particularly noteworthy.

In 1973, Saxon became a member of the a religious commune known as the Source Family, which lived in the Hollywood Hills and was led by Jim Baker, also known as Father Yod and YaHoWha. Baker gave Saxon the names Sunlight and Arlick. Subsequently, Saxon became a vegetarian. In 1998, Saxon orchestrated the release of a 13-CD set of the psychedelic tribal music recorded by the commune's band Ya Ho Wha 13 during the 1970s.

In subsequent years, Saxon released a number of albums under various band names including The Starry Seeds Band, Sky Saxon & Firewall, The Hour, Wolf Pack, Fast Planet, Back to the Garden, King Arthur's Court, and Shapes Have Fangs. In late 1999 Saxon teamed up with his friend Djin Aquarian from the Ya Ho Wa 13 band on guitar, with drummer David Walas and bass player David Phillips. This led to an album released after the band stopped playing together called This Band Was From Mt. Shasta. Additionally, Saxon had several times reformed The Seeds with different musician line-ups.

In 2008, Saxon and the Seeds collaborated on some new songs and recordings with Billy Corgan of the Smashing Pumpkins. Saxon later appeared in the music video of the Smashing Pumpkins' song "Superchrist". Sky Saxon's last performance and recording was done in Austin, Texas.

== Death ==
On June 25, 2009, at age 71, Saxon died unexpectedly in an Austin, Texas, hospital of heart and renal failure due to a simple untreated infection that had spread throughout his organs. Saxon's death was overshadowed by the death of Farrah Fawcett, which in turn was heavily overshadowed by the death of Michael Jackson, all on the same date.

At the time of his death, he had been scheduled to commence a tour of the United States and Canada as part of the "California '66" tour, featuring reformed versions of The Seeds, The Electric Prunes, and Love.

On July 24, 2009, members of The Smashing Pumpkins, Love, and The Electric Prunes performed a tribute concert at the Echoplex in Los Angeles in Saxon's memory.

== See also ==
- Dog Commune
