= Process Media =

Independent publishing house

- Founded: 2005
- Founder: Adam Parfrey and Jodi Wille
- Country of origin: United States
- Headquarters location: Port Townsend, Washington
- Publication types: books
- Official website: processmediainc.com

Process Media is an independent publishing house started in 2005 in Los Angeles by Adam Parfrey of Feral House and Jodi Wille of Dilettante Press, and headquartered in Port Townsend.

== Awards ==
=== Independent Publisher Book Awards ===
- 2006 Best Historical Fiction Book. Winner: The Nero Prediction by Humphry Knipe
- 2006 Best Book on Sexuality/Relationships. Winner: Sex Machines by Timothy Archibald
- 2006 Best Juvenile/Teen Young Adult Non-fiction. Finalist: Go Ask Ogre by Jolene Siana
- 2007 Best Reference Book of the Year. Bronze: Preparedness Now! by Aton Edwards
- 2008 Best Popular Culture Book. Bronze Award: The Source: The Untold Story of Father Yod, Ya Ho Wa 13, and The Source Family by Isis Aquarian
- 2008 Best Biography. Bronze: Moondog, The Viking of Sixth Avenue by Robert Scotto

=== Other awards ===
- 2008 ARSC Award for Excellence. Best Research in Recorded Classical Music, History: Moondog, The Viking of Sixth Avenue by Robert Scotto
