= The Seeds (album) =

Studio album by the Seeds
- Released: April 1966
- Genre: Garage rock; psychedelic rock; proto-punk; acid rock
- Length: 34:44
- Label: GNP Crescendo
- Producer: Sky Saxon

The Seeds chronology
The Seeds (1966)	A Web of Sound (1966)

Singles from The Seeds
- 1. "Can't Seem to Make You Mine" Released: June 1965; 2. "Pushin' Too Hard" Released: November 1965; 3. "Try to Understand" Released: November 1966

The Seeds is the debut album by American garage rock band the Seeds. It was released in April 1966 through GNP Crescendo Records and produced by Sky Saxon. After the release of two singles in 1965, "Can't Seem to Make You Mine" and "Pushin' Too Hard", the album was released and charted in the United States where it peaked at No. 132 on the Billboard Top LPs & Tape chart. Modern reception of the album is positive, with Malcolm Russel noting the band's influence on CBGB musicians a decade later.

== Release ==
The Seeds released two singles ahead of the album: "Can't Seem to Make You Mine" in June 1965 and "Pushin' Too Hard" in November. The Seeds was released in April 1966 and charted in the United States, peaking at No. 132 on the Billboard Top LPs & Tape chart. The first single to follow up the album's release was "Try to Understand", which failed to chart in the US. "Pushin' Too Hard" was re-issued in October 1966 and peaked at No. 36 in the US in February 1967.

The Seeds has been re-issued several times in the United Kingdom on vinyl and CD. Several re-issues contain bonus tracks while the album itself has also been re-released as a double album on compact disc with the Seeds' second album, A Web of Sound.

In 2012, Big Beat Records re-released the Seeds' debut album as a deluxe edition, with the album in remastered mono form, plus ten new bonus tracks of previously unreleased material.

== Music ==
Like many garage rock bands, lead singer Sky Saxon's vocal style was influenced by the vocals of Rolling Stones front man Mick Jagger, but have also received comparisons to the vocals of rockabilly acts such as Buddy Holly and Eddie Cochran.

Garrett Martin of Paste Magazine said: "With 'Can’t Seem to Make You Mine' and 'Pushin’ Too Hard,' songwriter Sky Saxon turns the tension and frustration of teenage lust and rebellion into two [...] pop songs. The first is a slow burn of unrequited desire, the second a manic, twitchy screed against everything pressuring the then-18-year-old Saxon to grow up. These songs, and the rest of The Seeds’ first self-titled album, foreshadow the rise of punk as much as the Sonics or the Monks or anything else in the garage canon."

== Reception and legacy ==
Professional ratings
Review scores
Source	Rating
AllMusic	4.5/5 stars
Uncut	4.5/5 stars

Modern reception of the album has been generally positive. In their review for the double disc re-issue, AllMusic gave the album a positive rating of four and a half stars out of five, writing "The Seeds is probably the best album by any of the original American garage bands, without the usual time-filling cover versions and elongated jams, and of course it features the immortal 'Pushin' Too Hard' and the even better 'Can't Seem to Make You Mine', two classics of the Nuggets era." The British music magazine Uncut gave the compilation a positive rating of four and half stars out of five, describing the album as "...A brilliantly simple, headlong surge of fuzz-drenched guitar, bubbling organ riffs and Saxon's raw, throat-tearing vocals..." Many of the tracks are featured in The Seeds biopic documentary "Pushin' Too Hard" which had a sold out premiere in London in 2019.

Garrett Martin of Paste Magazine said: "Garage rock wasn’t about albums, especially in the ’60s. As with pop in general, singles were the dominant format. The first album from The Seeds can’t be denied in part because it houses two of the very best singles in the history of rock ’n’ roll."

== Track listing ==
All tracks are written by Sky Saxon, except where noted.

Side one
No.	Title	Writer(s)	Length
1.	"Can't Seem to Make You Mine"		3:05
2.	"No Escape"	Jimmy Lawrence, Jan Savage, Saxon	2:16
3.	"Lose Your Mind"		2:11
4.	"Evil Hoodoo"	Daryl Hooper, Saxon	5:19
5.	"Girl I Want You"		2:26
6.	"Pushin' Too Hard"		2:38

Side two
No.	Title	Length
7.	"Try to Understand"	2:53
8.	"Nobody Spoil My Fun"	3:54
9.	"It's a Hard Life"	2:40
10.	"You Can't Be Trusted"	2:12
11.	"Excuse, Excuse"	2:21
12.	"Fallin' in Love"	2:49

2012 Deluxe Reissue Bonus Tracks
No.	Title	Length
13.	"She's Wrong"	2:13
14.	"Daisy Mae"	2:20
15.	"Dreaming of Your Love"	2:19
16.	"Out of the Question - Take 1"	3:02
17.	"Out of the Question - Master"	2:23
18.	"Pushin' Too Hard (Take 1)"	3:15
19.	"Girl I Want You"	2:22
20.	"Evil Hoodoo (full length version)"	15:59
21.	"It's a Hard Life"	2:37
22.	"Nobody Spoil My Fun"	3:50

== Personnel ==
Musical personnel

- Sky Saxon – bass guitar, harmonica, vocals, producer, concept, cover art, liner notes
- Rick Andridge – drums
- Chuck Britz – engineer
- Cooker – guitar, bottleneck guitar
- Daryl Hooper – melodica, organ, piano, keyboards, vocals
- Jan Savage – guitar, rhythm guitar, vocals

Production personnel

- Mike Durrough – engineering, remixing, mixing
- David Hassinger – engineering
- Lanky Linstrot – engineering
- Stan Ross – remixing
- Doc Siegel – remixing
- Rafael O. Valentin – engineering
- Alec Palao – executive producer
- Neil Norman – executive producer
