= Million Tongues Festival =

Music festival

Million Tongues Festival is a Chicago-based music festival organized by artist, writer, and musician, Plastic Crimewave often hosted by Empty Bottle. The festival showcases national and international folk, experimental and "cult" musicians from the '60s, '70s, '80s and beyond. It has been called Chicago's "annual convergence of freak-folksters and grassroots noisicians" The festival has seen performances by Bert Jansch, Peter Walker, Michael Chapman, LSD March, Michael Yonkers, Simon Finn and Terry Reid, among others.
