= Stop Smiling =

Arts & culture magazine

Stop Smiling was an arts and culture magazine founded by J. C. Gabel in the Chicago suburb of Darien, Illinois. He started the magazine at age 19 in 1995. The magazine was published on a bimonthly basis. The headquarters was in both Chicago and New York. Each issue followed a theme and consisted of feature-length interviews, essays and oral histories. With a focus on preservation, Stop Smiling published some of the last in-depth conversations with Kurt Vonnegut, Robert Altman, Lee Hazlewood, and George Plimpton. The company ended the magazine in 2009 and became an independently owned imprint of Melville House Publishing.

Stop Smiling runs a storefront event space in Wicker Park, Chicago. Readings and Q&As are regularly broadcast on Chicago Public Radio.
