= Mr. Farmer =

Single by The Seeds

from the album A Web of Sound
- B-side: "Up in Her Room"
- Released: February 1967
- Recorded: 1966
- Genre: Psychedelic rock, garage rock
- Length: 2:58 (album version); 2:35 (single version)
- Label: GNP Crescendo
- Songwriter(s): Sky Saxon
- Producer(s): Marcus Tybalt

The Seeds singles chronology
"Pushin' Too Hard" (1966)	"Mr. Farmer" (1967)	"Can't Seem to Make You Mine" (1967)

"Mr. Farmer" is a song by American garage rock group The Seeds, written by vocalist Sky Saxon and produced by Marcus Tybalt. It was released as a single in 1967 and peaked at number 86 on the U.S. Billboard Hot 100 chart. The song was banned on many radio stations during the time of its release because of its drug references.

== Lyrical content and recording ==
Written by Sky Saxon, "Mr. Farmer" depicts the tale of a man who becomes dissatisfied with city life and moves to the country, buys five acres, and spends time watering crops. Though Saxon attempted to disguise the lyrics to make the song's message appear anti-drug, the song was widely interpreted as a tribute to marijuana growers and was banned on many radio stations.

Keyboardist Daryl Hooper later recalled discussing the song's bassline with Harvey Sharp, who had often played bass with the band in studio. Because the Seeds did not employ a bassist during live performances, Hooper used the left-hand bass on a Wurlitzer during small club performances, and later used a Fender Rhodes bass for larger shows.

== Reception ==
"Mr. Farmer" was released as a single in February 1967 and peaked at number 86 on the U.S. Billboard Hot 100 chart. In the "Monkees on Tour" episode of The Monkees, a promotional copy of the single is shown being played by Phoenix radio station KRIZ when the band visits. Music historian Domenic Priore compared the song's piano sound to that of early Pink Floyd records. Author Harvey Kubernik called the song a "punk-pop classic", and writer Malcolm Russell described it as a "tight groover".

== Other appearances and versions ==
"Mr. Farmer" appears on the 1987 compilation More Nuggets: Classics from the Psychedelic Sixties Volume 2 and is featured on the 2000 soundtrack to the film Almost Famous. Sky Saxon revisited the song on his 2008 solo album The King of Garage Rock. Psychedelic rock band Strawberry Alarm Clock recorded a cover version of the song on their 2012 album Wake Up Where You Are.

== Track listing ==
7" Vinyl

No.	Title	Writer(s)	Length
1.	"Mr. Farmer"	Sky Saxon	2:35
2.	"Up in Her Room"	Saxon	3:40

== Chart performance ==
Chart (1967)	Peak position	Date
U.S. Billboard Hot 100	86	March 1967
