= A Web of Sound =

Studio album by The Seeds
- Released: October 10, 1966
- Recorded: 5–29 July 1966, Columbia Studios, RCA Victor Studios Hollywood, California
- Genre: Garage rock; psychedelic rock; proto-punk; acid rock
- Length: 37:53
- Label: GNP Crescendo
- Producer: Marcus Tybalt

The Seeds chronology
The Seeds (1966)	A Web of Sound (1966)	Future (1967)

Singles from A Web of Sound
- 1. "Mr. Farmer" Released: February 1967

A Web of Sound is the second album by the American garage rock band the Seeds. Produced by Marcus Tybalt (aka Sky Saxon) and released in October 1966, it contained the single "Mr. Farmer" and the 14-minute closing song "Up In Her Room". The album did not chart, though it has received generally favorable reviews from music critics.

== Background ==
By the summer of 1966, The Seeds had released three singles and an LP, all of which had failed to chart. They remained popular in the Los Angeles club scene playing at places like Bido Lito's, where they secured a residency and avid fanbase. By this time, leader and lead singer Sky Saxon had ingratiated himself with the Hollywood party scene, increasing his use of marijuana and LSD, as opposed to the other band members who largely avoided the city's nightlife. The band took credit for being one of the first "flower-power" bands on the scene, with music that had a decidedly psychedelic slant. At this point keyboardist Daryl Hooper began to expand his sound with the addition of a Farfisa electric organ and Fender bass keyboard on top of the Wurlitzer electric piano, often playing cross-handed between the Farfisa and Wurlitzer. Although the recently released self-titled debut album had failed to chart (it would eventually peak at No. 132 in January 1967, after the belated success of "Pushin' Too Hard"), heavy sales in the Los Angeles area encouraged record label GNP Crescendo to bring them back into the studio to record a followup.

== Songs and recording ==
A Web of Sound was produced by Saxon (under the pseudonym Marcus Tybalt) at Columbia Studio D, Hollywood, in July 1966 with Rafael Valentin as engineer. Although Hooper was now utilizing the Fender bass keyboard on stage, the group brought in Harvey Sharpe to fulfill bass duties on the album. In addition, Norman Desrosiers (aka "Cooker") from The Groupies played slide guitar and harmonica, which when combined with the Daryl's new Farfisa organ gave the album a different sound to the debut. Many of the songs were developed on the spot in the studio, with Hooper working out the music and arrangements while Saxon provided lyrics.

Sessions began on July 5 with four takes of "Tripmaker" and eleven takes of "I Tell Myself". Saxon claimed that "Tripmaker" was about avoiding people who sold bad or homemade drugs, with Hooper adding that with songs like this the group were now leading into psychedelia. Saxon played an English bobby's whistle at the intro. On July 11, fourteen takes of "Rollin' Machine" were attempted, with the song referring to a cigarette roller which could be used for tobacco or marijuana. On the next day the group went through eleven takes of a song improvised in the studio, "Just Let Go". The more intricately arranged "Pictures and Designs" took twenty-two takes, as Saxon had trouble coming in at the right moment. The psychedelic explosion at the close of the song was achieved by dropping Jan's St. George reverb unit six feet onto the ground. On July 13 the ballad "A Faded Picture" took seven takes to get a master, with Hooper recalling that Saxon was moved to the brink of tears during his vocal. Hooper also added a celeste on top of the Wurlitzer for a baroque sound. The band also attempted to re-record the 1965 B-side "Out Of The Question" but this was left as an outtake until the original version would see inclusion on the following album Future.

On July 14 the group moved to RCA with engineer David Hassinger to record "Mr. Farmer" (simply titled "The Farmer" on the original LP). Hooper recalls coming up the song's primary riff in a dream, which he played on the Farfisa's oboe setting. Saxon's lyrics about the new "back to the land" farming movement were taken as a double entendre for growing marijuana, which led to the song being banned from some radio stations when it was released as the lead single from the album that December. The band then moved on to the final song, "Up In Her Room", a 14-minute, two chord jam that had been developed on stage and featured an unambiguously sexual lyric, which came to a freak-out climax. The song's length was inspired by The Rolling Stones' 11-minute "Goin' Home", which had been recorded with Hassinger at RCA seven months prior. According to Hooper, it evoked a special reaction from the audience:

The long songs were an evolution from the clubs; you saw the dancers out there, and you got that feeling that they didn't want you to quit. The energy in the song grew as it went along, then it would peak, and then mellow a little, and then reach another plateau. In concert form, it was absolutely incredible. The crowd would be at a frenzy by the end, and the girls would just be going crazy.

In order to retain its live feel, "Up In Her Room" was recorded as it happened, with the first take accidentally truncated after the tape reel ran out and the second take providing the master. July 21 and 29 were devoted to additional overdubs on "I Tell Myself", "Rollin' Machine", "Just Let Go" and "Pictures and Designs", followed by three days of mixing both mono and stereo editions. Oddly, the fuzz guitar and organ solo was mixed out of "Just Let Go", which was restored as a bonus track on the 2013 deluxe CD release.

== Title and album cover art ==
Lead singer Sky Saxon conceptualized the album's title and cover design depicting the four Seeds members trapped in a spider's web. He also penned the liner notes under the "Marcus Tybalt" alias.

== Release ==
Released in October 1966, A Web of Sound did not receive much attention in the United States for several months until after the band's "Pushin' Too Hard", a song from their self-titled debut album, was re-released and entered the Billboard Hot 100 singles chart at the end of the year. Eventually, "Mr. Farmer" also charted at #86 nationally in early 1967, although The Seeds were far more popular in their hometown of Los Angeles where both "Pushin' Too Hard" and "Mr. Farmer" made the top 10 of KRLA Requests.

== Reception ==
Professional ratings
Review scores
Source	Rating
AllMusic	(reissue)
Uncut	4/5 stars

Pete Johnson, in a 1967 Los Angeles Times review, stated that with A Web of Sound, the Seeds had "been adopted by the hippies – the flower children – because of their open-ended songs which generally skirt neatly plotted thoughts and didacticism." Some contemporary music critics compare album track "Up In Her Room" to The Velvet Underground song "Sister Ray", which was released a year later. In the book All Yesterdays' Parties: The Velvet Underground in Print, 1966–1971, author Clinton Heylin wrote that "both songs work much the same way [...] listening to them is humming in a room where another dozen people are humming also, in a constant pitch, never varying, unchanging".

AllMusic's Joe Viglione suggested that A Web of Sound also influenced such artists as Iggy Pop and the Stooges and Alice Cooper. Stewart Mason, also of Allmusic, remarked that the album blended "the snotty aggression of [The Seeds] a bit with some heavier psychedelic flourishes". Writer Malcolm Russell described A Web of Sound as being "more adventurous" than the band's debut album, and said it "brimmed with scratchy mid-60s classics". Don Jacobson of The Beachwood Reporter called it "one of the all-time craziest mid-60s pioneering rock 'n' roll records". Researcher/author Martin C. Strong wrote that the album is "full of weird, psychotic blues highlighting [Saxon's] demented vocal sermonizing on such reliable topics as sex, drugs, and rock 'n' roll".

== Track listing ==
=== Side One ===
No.	Title	Writer(s)	Length
1.	"Mr. Farmer"	Sky Saxon	2:52
2.	"Pictures and Designs"	Daryl Hooper, Saxon	2:44
3.	"Tripmaker"	Hooper, Marcus Tybalt	2:48
4.	"I Tell Myself"	Tybalt	2:31
5.	"A Faded Picture"	Hooper, Saxon	5:20
6.	"Rollin' Machine"	Saxon, Tybalt	2:32

=== Side Two ===
No.	Title	Writer(s)	Length
1.	"Just Let Go"	Hooper, Jan Savage, Saxon	4:21
2.	"Up in Her Room"	Saxon	14:45

== Personnel ==
- Rick Andridge – Drums
- Darryl Hooper – Keyboards, organ, piano, backing vocals
- Jan Savage – Guitars, backing vocals
- Sky Saxon – Lead vocalist, bass guitar
- Cooker – Slide guitar
- Harvey Sharpe – Bass guitar
- Dave Hassinger, Raphael Valentin – Engineers
