= Ya Ho Wha 13 =

- Ya Ho Wha 13 and The Source Family

Background information
- Also known as: Ya Ho Wa 13, Yahowa13
- Origin: Hollywood Hills, Los Angeles, California, U.S.
- Genres: Psychedelic rock, experimental rock, jam band
- Years active: 1970s–present
- Labels: Higher Key, Swordfish Records, Drag City Records, Captain Trip Records
- Website: yahowha.org

Ya Ho Wha 13, otherwise known as Ya Ho Wa 13 or Yahowha 13, is a psychedelic rock band fronted by Father Yod (/joʊd/ YOHD), spiritual leader of a religious commune called the Source Family, based in Los Angeles.

The band has released nine LPs of psychedelic music, which varied dramatically in style and quality. Some of the group's music featured tribal drums and distorted guitars or unrehearsed jam sessions, and others were relatively more conventional rock or folk music. Many of the musicians affiliated with Ya Ho Wa 13 were amateurs or obscure, but Sky Saxon was affiliated with the group for a period.

== Formation ==
In the early 1970s, members of The Source Family, who lived in the former Harry Chandler mansion in Los Feliz in the Hollywood Hills, formed an improvisational, psychedelic music group. Their name was inspired by the Tetragramaton, the four-letter name of God in Judaism. In 1973 they began recording LPs in a studio in a garage at the family's communal residence.

All the records made with Father Yod's participation were improvised, with no rehearsals or overdubs. Most were pressed in small runs of 500 to 1000 copies on the Higher Key label and sold to the public in Father Yod's vegetarian restaurant.

Nine LPs were produced and released, but more than 65 albums were thought to have been recorded by the group and then lost over the years. The group's historian and archivist later found unreleased music tapes in the archives, and it was planned to remaster and release them through Drag City Records of Chicago and the group's website.

The band changed members and its name occasionally, from Father Yod and the Spirit of ’76 to Ya Ho Wha 13 to The Savage Sons of Ya Ho Wha, Yodship, and Fire Water Air. The key players were always the same: Djin Aquarian on guitar, Octavius Aquarian on drums, and Sunflower Aquarian on bass. Other family musicians were Lovely Aquarian, Zoroaster Aquarian, Hom Aquarian, Rhythm Aquarian, Pythias Aquarian, Aquariana Aquarian, Ahom Aquarian, and Electron Aquarian.

Father Yod does not appear on all album releases, but on those on which he participates, he handles lead vocals and percussion on a kettle drum. Yahowha 13 was Father Yod's signature band. He intended that its music and lyrics should continue his teaching after he was gone. Sky Saxon of The Seeds joined the Source Family in 1973 and also appeared on the band's recordings.

== Discography ==
=== Father Yod and the Spirit of ‘76 ===
- Kohoutek (1973)
- Contraction (1974)
- Expansion (1974)
- All or Nothing at All (1974)

Father Yod does not participate on All or Nothing at All, unlike the previous three albums released under this incarnation, in which his chanting and singing vocals are prominent.

=== Ya Ho Wa 13 ===
- Ya Ho Wa 13 (1974), recorded at the Father House garage.
- Savage Sons of Ya Ho Wa (1974), recorded at the Father House garage.
- Penetration: An Aquarian Symphony (1974), recorded at the Father House garage, is the band's most popular recording and has been reissued several times.
- I'm Gonna Take You Home (1974), also called The Lovers, was recorded at the Father House garage.
- To the Principles, For the Children (1974), recorded at the Father House garage.
- The Operetta (1975), not released until the 2000s.

By the end of 1974, the Source Family had tried to move to Hawaii but were met with hostility, which forced them to temporarily relocate to Northern California before eventually returning. This album was recorded during that time, and the tension is apparent. It has been described as “a more personalized, painfully vulnerable” collection of songs. This long-lost final album of Ya Ho Wha with Father's participation was recently released by Swordfish Records. It was recorded in the spring of 1975, just after Ya Ho Wha's spontaneous visit to India, which culminated in his initiation in the Great Pyramid of Giza on Easter Sunday. He was en route to the US via France when the plane was rerouted due to a storm and forced to land in Cairo, Egypt. Upon arrival, the group (there were four traveling) hailed a taxi, and the taxi driver suggested they stay at his brother's house. The next morning at 4 am, they proceeded to the Great Pyramids. Upon arrival, they were greeted by a mysterious man who escorted them through the Great Pyramid. This LP represents the first recording Ya Ho Wha made after his "resurrection" in the Great Pyramid, and is also his last full collaboration with the band.

- Sonic Portation, the first record release of the remaining members of YaHoWha13 in over 33 years through ProphaseMusic. The band released two more albums called 2013.

== Music after Father's death ==
After Father Yod / Ya Ho Wha's hang-gliding accident and death in Hawaii in 1975, the original Yahowa 13 band dissolved, though many of the members continue to make music.

- Golden Sunrise (Fire Water Air, 1977), the first recording after Father Yod's death and the first featured appearance of Sky Saxon of The Seeds.
- Yodship Suite (1977) was a private pressing, and, except for Sky Saxon, the specific family members involved are unknown. The sound takes on a softer, less acid rock tone with flutes and acoustic guitars, and most of the songs are laments about Father's death.
- Yodship Suite, Part 3 (c. 1977), the last Ya Ho Wha-related album to be released. This poorly documented album features recordings from 1973 featuring the Spirit of '76 band, but with Sky Saxon on vocals instead of Father Yod. It's a one-sided LP with about 15 minutes of music, containing two different tracks spliced together. The music is considerably more aggressive than the preceding Yod Ship Suite. Only 2–3 copies of this album are known to exist.

== Legacy ==
Original LP pressings released under the various incarnations of Ya Ho Wha 13 have become collectible and can command high prices on the secondary market. Contraction and Expansion are among the better-known sought-after releases, while All or Nothing at All and Yodship are also considered particularly scarce.

Sky Saxon, singer of the seminal garage band The Seeds collaborated with Japanese label Captain Trip Records in 1998 to produce a deluxe 13-CD box set entitled God and Hair, including CD reissues of the original Source Family records and some unreleased material. In 2002, The Source Foundation Corp LLC/Source.Org was created, and is currently not affiliated with the remaining members of YaHoWha13, nor involved with present musical endeavors.

Swordfish Records in the UK, in collaboration with The Source Foundation Corp LLC, remastered and released some of the Higher Key Record Catalog as both limited pressing LPs and CDs. This includes, Penetration, I'm Going to Take You Home (Lovers/Chariot), and To the Principles for the Children. In the summer of 2009, Drag City Records released Magnificence in the Memory, rare cuts of YaHoWha13 from the archives of the Source Foundation.

In 2007, the three surviving members of YaHoWha13 (Sunflower, Octavius, and Djin) were invited by Isis Aquarian and Jodi Wille of Process to play in Los Angeles for their Source Book coming out event, the untold story of "Father Yod, Ya Ho Wha 13 and the Source Family". This was the first time they had played together in 33 years. This led to their first recording of Sonic Portation (Prophase Music). YaHoWha13 made several appearances in Los Angeles and San Francisco.

In 2009, Ya Ho Wha 13 played on the East Coast and in Canada. They are currently working on their new live/studio album, and appeared at The South by SouthWest Music Festival in Austin, Texas, in spring of 2010 - playing with experimental psychedelic bands The Acid Mothers Temple and Plastic Crimewave Sound.

== See also ==
- Father Yod
- Tom Stone
