= The Seeds =

American rock band

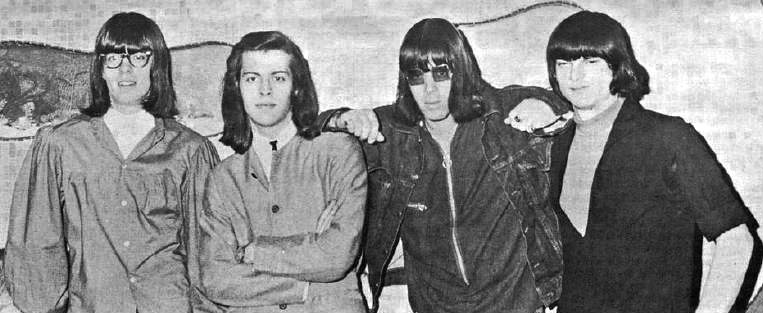
- The Seeds in 1966. From left: Rick Andridge, Daryl Hooper, Sky Saxon, Jan Savage

Background information
- Origin: Los Angeles, California, U.S.
- Genres: Psychedelic rock; garage rock; acid rock
- Years active: 1965–1969, 1969–1972 (as Sky Saxon and the Seeds), 1989, 2003–2009, 2017–present (as Daryl Hooper and the Seeds)
- Labels: GNP Crescendo; MGM; Bam Caruso; Ace/Big Beat; Hypnotic Bridge
- Members: Daryl Hooper; Alec Palao; Paul Kopf; Mark Bellgraph; Justin Smith
- Past members: Sky Saxon; Jan Savage; Rick Andridge; Don Boomer; Bob Norsoph; Bill Chiapparelli; Jeff Prentice; Rik Collins; Dave Klein; Justin Polimeni; Jeremy Levine; Harvey Sharpe; Jimmy Valentine; Sean M'Lady; Dave Walle; Tommy Gunn; Christopher Robin; Gary Stern; Don Bolles; Geoff Brandin; Kevin Dippold; Atomic; Justino

The Seeds are an American psychedelic garage rock band that formed in Los Angeles, California in 1965, best known for their highest-charting single "Pushin' Too Hard". The band's classic lineup featured frontman Sky Saxon in lead vocals and bass guitar, along with guitarist Jan Savage (born Buck Jan Reeder), keyboardist Daryl Hooper and drummer Rick Andridge. In 1968, the band changed their name to Sky Saxon and the Seeds, with Savage and Andridge departing the band. They went on to release a handful of additional singles.

In 1989, the original lineup of the band reformed for a handful of live dates in the US.

In 2003, Saxon was persuaded to reform the Seeds with original guitarist Jan Savage (who departed part way through a European tour the same year due to ill health). Releasing two further studio albums, Saxon-led versions of the band continued to tour the US, UK, and Europe up to Saxon's death in 2009.

In 2017, founding member Hooper reformed the Seeds with a lineup of past and new members; they released a single in 2021 and continue to tour to this day.

== History ==
=== Formation ===
The Seeds were formed in 1965 following the dissolution of the short lived band the Amoeba which featured frontman Sky Saxon.

Saxon, who had relocated to Los Angeles from Salt Lake City and had already released material under several names including Little Richie Marsh and Sky Saxon & the Soul Rockers put an ad in the LA Times for a keyboard player. Having already enlisted former bandmate Jan Savage as lead guitarist and Jeremy Levine as rhythm guitarist, Saxon reportedly contacted Daryl Hooper to recruit him as a keyboard player. After then asking Saxon whether he also needed a drummer, Hooper and Michigan school friend Rick Andridge met up with Saxon at a club and played that same night. Original rhythm guitarist Jeremy Levine left early on for personal reasons.

The band secured regular gigs at the LA club Bido Lito's and quickly gained a local reputation for high-energy live performances.

As a live act, the band was one of the first to utilize keyboard bass. Although Saxon was credited as playing bass on the studio albums and would mime playing bass on TV appearances, they usually employed session player Harvey Sharpe for studio work. On stage, keyboardist Daryl Hooper would perform the bass parts via a separate bass keyboard, in the same manner as Ray Manzarek later did with The Doors.

=== Recordings and TV appearances ===
After a tip from Hollywood impresario Jimmie Maddin, The Seeds were signed by Gene Norman to his GNP Crescendo label. The first single, "Can't Seem to Make You Mine", was a minor regional hit in Southern California in 1965. The song was also played regularly on AM rock stations in northern California (and probably elsewhere), where it was well received by listeners, and eventually went on to become, and is considered today, a '60s cult classic song. The band had a national Top 40 hit, "Pushin' Too Hard", in 1966 and performed the song on national television. Three subsequent singles, "Mr. Farmer" (also 1966), a re-release of "Can't Seem To Make You Mine" (1967), and "A Thousand Shadows" (1967), achieved more modest success, although all were most popular in southern California. Musically uncomplicated with a flair for simple melodic hooks and dominated by Saxon's unorthodox vocal delivery, their first two albums, The Seeds and A Web of Sound, are today considered classics of 1960s garage music.

A major turning point for the Seeds came in 1967. The band's self-produced third album Future presented a grander psychedelic artistic statement and thrust the group forward as torchbearers during perhaps the most creative and experimental time in American pop culture and music history. The more expansive musical style with accompanying orchestration—presented with a gatefold sleeve featuring ornate flower-themed artwork by painter Sassin—was a departure from the rawer tone of the band's previous hits. Iggy Pop, Smashing Pumpkins, Animal Collective and members of the Beach Boys have all sourced the band, mentioning this album and previous ones as genre classics.

The release of Future in mid-1967 generally marked the commercial peak of the Seeds' career, coinciding with a major national hit, raucous concerts, numerous live TV performances, as well as prominent guest appearances on the NBC sitcom The Mothers-in-Law and in the hippie/counterculture-themed cult film Psych-Out. In October 1966, The Seeds recorded an album devoted specifically to the blues, A Full Spoon of Seedy Blues that was released in November 1967, bearing the artist moniker "The Sky Saxon Blues Band" and with liner notes reputedly by Muddy Waters. Saxon later claimed that the album "... was my idea to get off the record label. I thought that if we just came up out of nowhere and did a blues album that wasn't going to sell, then they'd drop us. I never expected it to sell but it did OK. We never did those songs live except for a week of gigs at the Golden Bear in Huntington Beach".

In May 1968 the band released their final LP for GNP Crescendo Records, Raw & Alive: The Seeds in Concert at Merlin's Music Box, which revisited their more aggressive garage rock roots. However, the album and its accompanying single "Satisfy You" both failed to chart nationally. The band was renamed "Sky Saxon and the Seeds" in 1968, by which point Bob Norsoph (guitar) and Don Boomer (drums) had replaced Savage and Andridge, respectively. They were featured on the final GNP Crescendo single "Falling Off The Edge Of My Mind", the first and only period Seeds single not written by Saxon or the other members. The last major label records of new material by The Seeds – two non-charting singles on MGM Records – were released in 1970, after which Hooper quit. Saxon continued to use the name "The Seeds", utilizing various backup musicians, at least through 1972.

=== Dissolution and reformations ===
After the dissolution of the Seeds, Sky Saxon joined the Yahowha religious group, inspired by their leader Father Yod. Although a member of the Source Family for several years, Saxon did not participate in any of the albums released by Yahowha 13 in the mid-1970s. He does appear on the Golden Sunrise album by Fire Water Air, which was a Yahowha 13 offshoot, and later recorded the Yod Ship Suite album in memory of the deceased Father Yod. In the 1970s, Saxon also released the solo LPs Lovers Cosmic Voyage (credited to Sunlight) and Live at the Orpheum credited to Sunlight Rainbow. In the 1980s, Saxon collaborated with several bands—including Redd Kross and The Chesterfield Kings—before reforming the original Seeds in 1989 to headline "The Summer of Love Tour", along with Big Brother and the Holding Company, Arthur Lee and Love, The Music Machine, and The Strawberry Alarm Clock.

The Seeds remained dormant again until 2003, when Rik Collins persuaded Saxon to reform the group with original guitarist Jan Savage and newcomers Collins on bass, Mark Bellgraph on guitar, Dave Klein on keyboards and Justin Polimeni on drums. This iteration of the Seeds went through several incarnations, with Savage departing midway through their 2003 European tour due to his health. Saxon remained the only original member, and with several different sets of musicians continued to tour Europe and the United States.

Saxon died on June 25, 2009, of heart and kidney failure. The Seeds' original drummer, Rick Andridge, died in 2011. Jan Savage died on August 5, 2020, aged 77.

In June 2017, a "reunited version" of the band (with founding member Daryl Hooper and late period Seeds drummer Don Boomer, along with Paul Kopf on lead vocals and Seeds archivist Alec Palao on bass) gave their first performance after a viewing of the Seeds documentary The Seeds: Pushin' Too Hard at the Center for the Arts in Grass Valley, California. Hooper's Seeds continue to tour and now incorporate Mark Bellgraph and Justin Smith from Saxon’s 2000s-era band. In 2021, the current line-up of the band released a single, "Butterfly Child" / "Vampire".

== Style ==
The band's early material has been described as "straight up garage rock." Later output, such as 1967's Future, was described as having a psychedelic rock sound.

== Reissues ==
While GNP Crescendo has kept the Seeds catalog in print since the mid-1970s, the first notable archival compilation of the band was 1977’s Fallin’ Off The Edge, compiled by Neil Norman, son of GNP’s founder Gene Norman. This was later expanded in the CD era as Travel With Your Mind in 1993. In 1996, Drop Out Records released Flower Punk, a box set of their first five albums, The Seeds, A Web of Sound, Future, A Full Spoon of Seedy Blues (as the Sky Saxon Blues Band), and Raw & Alive: The Seeds in Concert at Merlin's Music Box, plus several rarities, B-sides, and other cuts (nothing unreleased) as a three-disc collection.

In 2011, Ace Records instigated a thorough reappraisal of The Seeds’ recorded legacy, helmed by reissue producer Alec Palao. Each of the band’s four principal albums was remastered, with a considerable amount of additional, mostly unreleased, material added. Initially presented as CD editions, they have also subsequently been issued as deluxe 2-LP sets. Ace/Big Beat also released the definitive compilation Singles As & Bs 1965-1970 and the soundtrack CD to the film The Seeds: Pushin' Too Hard.

== Documentary ==
A 2014 feature-length documentary film about the Seeds titled The Seeds: Pushin' Too Hard was directed by Neil Norman and written/produced by Alec Palao. The film draws on first-hand knowledge of the band, interviews, and concert footage.

== Legacy and influence ==
Musicians in both the US and the UK have described The Seeds as an important influence on the early punk movement. Cover versions of various Seeds songs have been recorded by Cabaret Voltaire, The Dwarves, Alex Chilton, Johnny Thunders, The Ramones, Yo La Tengo, Garbage, Murder City Devils, Spirits in the Sky, Paul Parker, Pere Ubu, The Makers, The Embarrassment, The Bangles, The Rubinoos, Strawberry Alarm Clock, and other artists. Some lyrics in Frank Zappa's album Joe's Garage satirically refer to "Pushin' Too Hard": "You're plooking too hard, plooking too hard on ME".

On July 24, 2009, a tribute concert to the recently deceased Sky Saxon was performed at the Echoplex venue in Los Angeles. Performers included guitarist Nels Cline and members of The Smashing Pumpkins, The Strawberry Alarm Clock, The Electric Prunes.

== Discography ==
=== Albums ===
Original Seeds line-up:

- The Seeds (April 1966)
- A Web of Sound (October 1966)
- Future (August 1967)
- A Full Spoon of Seedy Blues (as the Sky Saxon Blues Band) (November 1967)
- Raw & Alive: The Seeds in Concert at Merlin's Music Box (May 1968)

Sky Saxon-fronted line-ups:

- Red Planet (2004)
- Back to the Garden (2008)

=== Compilations ===
- Fallin' Off the Edge (April 1977)
- Bad Part of Town (1982)
- Evil Hoodoo (1988)
- Travel with Your Mind (1993)
- Flower Punk (box set) (1996)
- Singles As & Bs 1965–1970 (compilation album) (2014)
- The Seeds: Pushin' Too Hard (original soundtrack) (2019)

=== Reissues ===
- The Seeds (reissued in mono with unreleased tracks) (2013)
- A Web of Sound (double CD mono/stereo reissued with unreleased tracks) (2014)
- Future (double CD mono/stereo reissued with unreleased tracks) (2014)
- Raw & Alive (double CD two concerts, the original without screaming and with crowd, and another earlier studio concert) (2014)

=== Singles (original line-up) ===
Year	Song	Peak chart positions		
Year	Song	U.S. Billboard	U.S. Cashbox	CAN
1965	"Can't Seem to Make You Mine" b/w "Daisy Mae"	—	—	—
1965	"You're Pushin' Too Hard" (Note: Original title.) b/w "Out of the Question"	—	—	—
1966	"Pushin' Too Hard" (re-release) b/w "Try to Understand"	36	40	44
1966	"Mr. Farmer" b/w "No Escape"	—	—	—
1967	"Mr. Farmer" (re-release) b/w "Up in Her Room"	86	109	—
1967	"Can't Seem to Make You Mine" (re-release) b/w "I Tell Myself"	41	55	33
1967	"A Thousand Shadows" b/w "March of the Flower Children"	72	86	—
1967	"The Wind Blows Your Hair" b/w "Six Dreams"	—	—	—
1968	"Satisfy You" b/w "900 Million People Daily Making Love"	—	—	—
1969	"Fallin' Off the Edge of My Mind" b/w "Wild Blood"	—	—	—
1970	"Bad Part of Town" b/w "Wish Me Up"	—	—	—
1970	"Love in a Summer Basket" b/w "Did He Die"	—	—	—
1972	"Shuckin' and Jiving" b/w "You Took Me By Surprise"	—	—	—
"—" denotes releases that did not chart.

Discography notes

== See also ==
- Dog Commune
