= Father Yod =

American spiritual leader and restaurateur (1922–1975)

- Father Yod demonstrating the star exercise
- Born: James Edward Baker; July 4, 1922; Cincinnati, Ohio, US
- Died: August 25, 1975 (aged 53); Oʻahu, Hawaii, US
- Other name: YaHoWa
- Occupations: Religious leader, restaurateur, musician
- Spouse: Robin Popper (1970-1975)
- Children: 3

Father Yod (/joʊd/ YOHD), or YaHoWha, born James Edward Baker (July 4, 1922 – August 25, 1975), was an American new religious movement founder, restaurateur, and musician. He was the owner of one of the first health food restaurants in the United States, the Source Restaurant on the Sunset Strip in West Hollywood, California. He founded a spiritual commune in the Hollywood Hills known as the Source Family. The Source Family was heavily influenced by the teachings of Yogi Bhajan and the astrological age of Aquarius. The Family practiced communal living in Southern California and later in Hawaii. He was also the frontman of the commune's band, Ya Ho Wha 13.

== Early life ==
James Edward Baker was born on July 4, 1922, in Cincinnati, Ohio. Although he said he had been awarded the a Silver Star while serving in the Marine Corps during World War II, the Corps does not carry his name in its official listing of Silver Star recipients. Baker also said he had become an expert in jujutsu. On 11 February 1949, he beat "Wild Bill Zim", an Argentinian, at judo in Cincinnati. He moved to California to become a Hollywood stuntman and became influenced by the Nature Boys, a Los Angeles–based group (including figures such as William Pester, eden ahbez, and Gypsy Boots) who maintained vegetarian diets and lived "according to Nature's Laws". Baker also studied philosophy, religion, and esotericism, becoming a Vedantic monk for a time. He later became a follower of Yogi Bhajan, a Sikh spiritual leader and teacher of Kundalini yoga.

In 1969, Baker founded the Source Restaurant on the Sunset Strip in West Hollywood, California. The restaurant served organic vegetarian food, and soon boasted celebrities such as John Lennon, Julie Christie, and Marlon Brando as regular customers. Baker had two other successful restaurants on Sunset Strip, the Aware Inn and the Old World.

Despite claims that he had fourteen different wives, he had only one legal wife as James Baker, Robin Popper, to whom he was married in 1970. Their daughter, Tau, was born on August 14, 1974. Popper later called him "a dirty old man on a lust trip".

== Source Family ==
Baker parted ways with Yogi Bhajan in the late 1960s and created his own philosophy based on Western esotericism. Changing his name to Father Yod or Ya Ho Wha, Baker became the patriarch of a commune of young people who considered him their spiritual father. Known as the Source Family, the group lived together in a mansion in Los Feliz built for publisher Harry Chandler and was supported by the earnings of the restaurant, which grossed $10,000 a day during its peak popularity.

Some of the doctrines of the Source Family were kept secret; however, they generally adopted a way of life that promoted health, organic vegetarian diets, communal living, free love, and utopian ideals. Father Yod had a core communal group of 150 people living in Los Feliz, and he had a "harem" of fourteen women, with whom he had three children.

== Music ==
Father Yod led Ya Ho Wha 13, a band composed of himself and other Source Family members which recorded several albums of mostly-improvised psychedelic rock.

== Death ==
On December 26, 1974, the Source Family sold their restaurant and moved to Hawaii. On August 25, 1975, Yod went hang gliding off a 1,300-foot (400 m) cliff on the eastern shore of Oʻahu, despite having no previous hang gliding experience. He crash-landed on the beach; he suffered no external injuries, but was unable to move and died nine hours later. He was 53 years old. The Source Family refers to this day as "Black Monday". After a three-day vigil, Yod was cremated and his ashes put to rest at Lanikai Beach on Oʻahu.

== Legacy ==
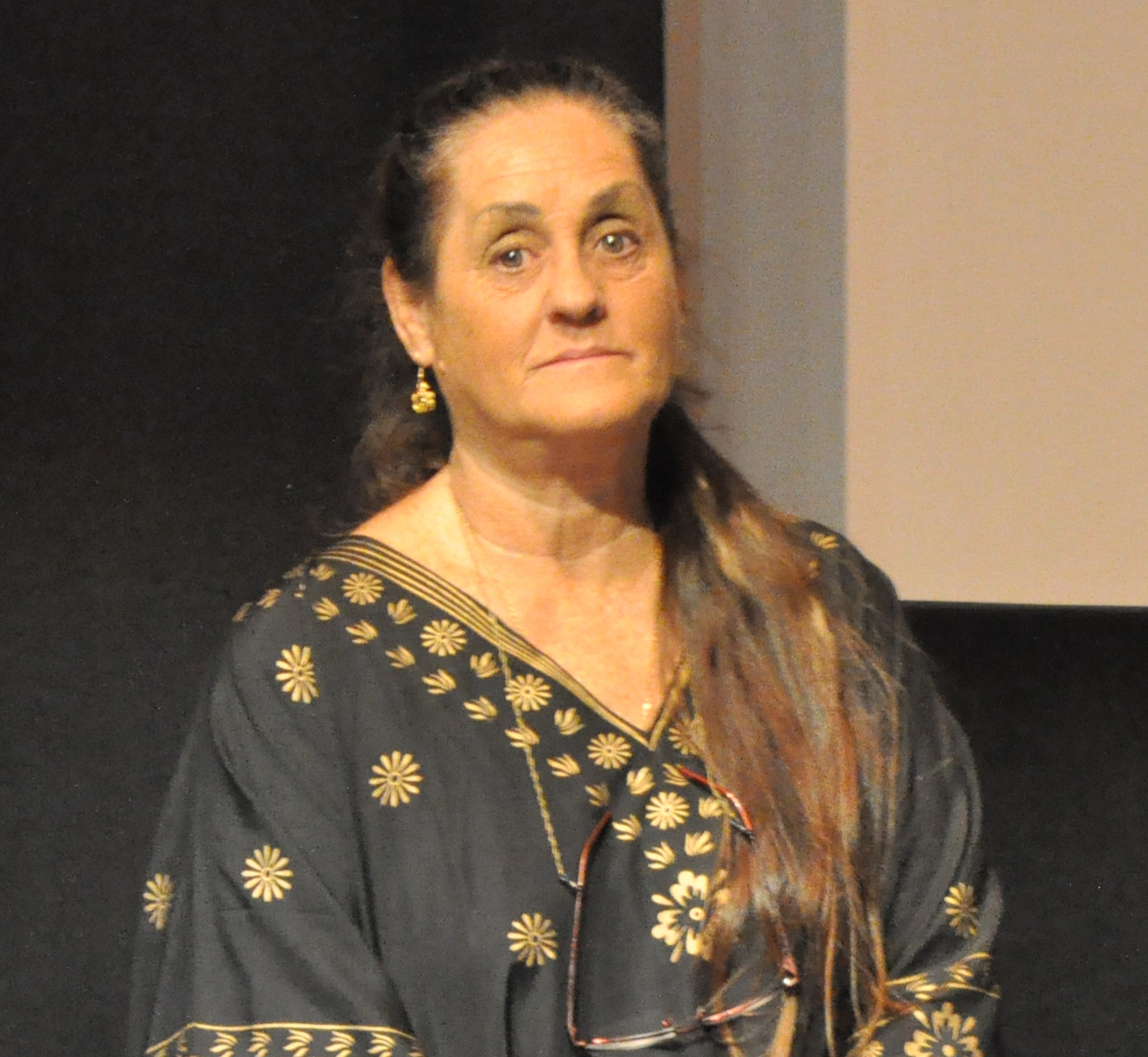
Isis Aquarian, 2012

In 2006, two Source Family members, Isis Aquarian and Electricity Aquarian, wrote a history of the group. A revised version of the book, entitled The Source: The Untold Story of Father Yod, Ya Ho Wa 13 and The Source Family, was released in 2007 by Process Media, and included a CD with live Ya Ho Wa 13 performances, radio interviews, and Family recordings. The Source Foundation was set up and released lost family music through Drag City, "Fathers Morning Meditation Tapes" through Global Recording Artist, a comic book, and the 2012 documentary The Source Family, co-directed by Jodi Wille and Maria Demopoulous.

Sean Lennon credited the Source Family with inspiring the look and attitude portrayed in the video for his 2013 song "Animals". The KPFA radio show Over the Edge, hosted by members of the band Negativland, presented a Source Family retrospective on June 30, 2017.

The Source Restaurant is featured in Woody Allen's 1977 film Annie Hall.
