= Simon Finn (musician) =

English psychedelic folk musician

- Born: March 4, 1951 (age 75); Godalming, Surrey, England
- Genre: Psychedelic folk
- Occupations: Singer-songwriter; musician
- Instruments: Vocals; guitar; piano
- Years active: 1969–1971, 1999–present
- Labels: Mushroom Records, Durtro, Preservation Records
- Website: simonfinn.co.uk

Simon Finn (born 4 March 1951) is an English psychedelic folk musician in Godalming, Surrey. He has played shows with Current 93, Graham Coxon, Thurston Moore, Anohni and the Johnsons, Blood on a Feather and more.

== Career ==
Simon Finn moved to London in 1967, where his first performance was opening for Al Stewart at the Marquee Club in Soho. He released his Pass the Distance LP in 1970, which in later years attained legendary status as it was so hard to obtain.

The album featured contributions from Robert Buckland, Paul Burwell, Ken Elliot, and David Toop. "Pass the Distance" was remastered and re-released on Durtro/Jnana records in 2004 and again in 2008 on vinyl by Mayfair Music. In the same year, after a thirty-five-year absence from the music scene, he began touring again. His first performance was in support of the band Current 93 at St George the Martyr Church in Toronto in June 2004. Since then, he has performed in Moscow, Athens, Glasgow, Barcelona, New York City, San Francisco, Chicago and many other cities around the world. His second album, Magic Moments, was his first new recording in 35 years and was released by Durtro/Jnana.

Finn resided in Montreal, Canada for most of the interim, and now divides his time between London and Montreal. He had been touring extensively both as a solo artist and as a member of Current 93. He is now again strictly a solo artist. His latest release, Accidental Life, appeared in July 2007 on his own label Ten-to-One. Finn has played shows with Current 93, Graham Coxon, Thurston Moore, Anohni and the Johnsons, Blood on a Feather and more.
