= Can't Seem to Make You Mine =

1967 song by The Seeds

Single by The Seeds

from the album The Seeds
- B-side: "Daisy Mae"
- Released: July 1965; April 1967 (re-issue)
- Recorded: April 21, 1965
- Studio: United Western Recorders, Hollywood
- Genre: Garage rock
- Length: 3:05
- Label: GNP Crescendo
- Songwriter(s): Sky Saxon
- Producer(s): Sky Saxon

The Seeds singles chronology
"Can't Seem to Make You Mine" (1965)	"Pushin' Too Hard" (1965)

"Can't Seem to Make You Mine" is a song by American rock group the Seeds, written by vocalist Sky Saxon and produced by Marcus Tybalt. It was released as a single in 1965 and re-issued in 1967, when it peaked at number 41 on the U.S. Billboard Hot 100 chart, and number 33 in Canada.

The song appears on the 1998 box set Nuggets: Original Artyfacts from the First Psychedelic Era, 1965–1968, and has been covered by such artists as the Ramones, Alex Chilton, Johnny Thunders, Yo La Tengo, Garbage, and Rumspringa.

== Recording and release ==
"Can't Seem to Make You Mine" was the first song recorded by the Seeds, according to keyboardist Daryl Hooper. "Sky started peddling it around to different record labels ... and got the typical 'we'll call you' routine, and Crescendo, for some reason, liked it and said they'd like to take us into a recording studio. When Sky got into the recording studio, he really put his all into his vocals." The recording session took place on April 21, 1965 at United Western Recorders, together with engineer Chuck Britz. Saxon produced and take #4 was the master.

The song was released as a single in July 1965, and first received radio airplay on Santa Monica's KBLA. Sky Saxon recalled in a 2006 interview: "they used to play 'Can't Seem to Make You Mine' as late as two in the morning. KRLA and all the rest of the stations jumped on it later, but KBLA broke it and people would stay up to hear it."

A regional hit in California, the single did not chart nationally until its April 1967 re-release, after the band's "Pushin' Too Hard" had reached the U.S. Top 40. "Can't Seem to Make You Mine" peaked at number 33 in Canada and number 41 on the U.S. Billboard Hot 100 chart.

The song features an instrumental by keyboardist Daryl Hooper, with guitar accompaniment.

There was also a radio edit version of this song, which omitted the repeat of the bridge section as well as a repeat of one of the verses. The song features a spoken duologue by Saxon before he repeats the final verse ("Come back, baby, I'm all alone").

== Critical reception ==
Music writer Malcolm Russell described the song as "a slow, angry piece which highlighted Saxon's unique vocal style – an inspired nasal snarl punctuated by howls, wails and yelps". Author Michael Hicks elaborated on Saxon's vocal style on the track: "he superimposes an Eddie Cochran-like buzz on classic Buddy Holly-style baby talk [and] adds a Jagger-like pseudo-dialect, but a seemingly arbitrary one, in which vowels are colored and recolored with no particular consistency." The song has been called a "garage rock classic" by authors Will Hodgkinson and Stephen Thomas Erlewine, and it is featured on the 1998 box set Nuggets: Original Artyfacts from the First Psychedelic Era, 1965–1968. The song placed fourth on Paste Magazine's 2014 list of the "50 Best Garage Rock Songs of All Time".

== Other versions and appearances ==
Alex Chilton covered this song on his 1978 "Bangkok" single. Johnny Thunders and Patti Palladin recorded the song on their 1988 album, Copy Cats. The Ramones covered it on the 1993 album, Acid Eaters. Yo La Tengo included their rendition of the song on their 1995 Camp Yo La Tengo EP. Garbage released a cover version as a B-side to the 1999 singles "When I Grow Up" and "The Trick Is to Keep Breathing". Murder City Devils covered the song for a 1999 split 45 with Gluecifer. Diplo sampled the track on his remix of Spank Rock's 2005 single "Put That Pussy on Me". Spirits in the Sky, a supergroup led by Billy Corgan, performed the song at a Sky Saxon tribute concert on July 24, 2009 in Los Angeles.

The song featured in the films Cop Land (1997) and Secretary (2002) and was briefly featured in the first episode of Netflix's original series, Stranger Things (2016). It was also used in a 2008 television commercial for Lynx/Axe body spray.

== Track listing ==
7" Vinyl (August 1965)

No.	Title	Writer(s)	Length
1.	"Can't Seem to Make You Mine"	Saxon	2:31
2.	"Daisy Mae"	Saxon	1:57

7" Vinyl (February 1967)

No.	Title	Writer(s)	Length
1.	"Can't Seem to Make You Mine"	Saxon	2:31
2.	"I Tell Myself"	Saxon	2:25

== Chart performance ==
Chart (1967)	Peak position
U.S. Billboard Hot 100	41
U.S. Cash Box Top 100	55
Canada RPM Magazine	33
