= Pushin' Too Hard =

- The cover of the 1966 re-issue

Single by The Seeds

from the album The Seeds
- B-side: "Out of the Question"; "Try to Understand" (re-issue)
- Released: November 1965; July 1966 (re-issue)
- Recorded: September 14, 1965
- Studio: United Western Recorders, Hollywood
- Genre: Garage rock; psychedelic rock; proto-punk
- Length: 2:38
- Label: GNP Crescendo
- Songwriter: Sky Saxon
- Producer: Sky Saxon

The Seeds singles chronology
"Can't Seem to Make You Mine" (1965)	"Pushin' Too Hard" (1965)	"Mr. Farmer" (1967)

"Pushin' Too Hard", originally titled "You're Pushing Too Hard", is a song by American rock group the Seeds, written by vocalist Sky Saxon and produced by Saxon with Marcus Tybalt. It was released as a single in 1965, re-issued the following year, and peaked at number 36 on the Billboard Hot 100 in February 1967 and number 44 in Canada in March.

The song became the signature tune for the group and a template for their musical style, so much so that Creem magazine later wrote that "the Seeds, of course, managed to work 'Pushin' Too Hard' into every song they ever did." It was included on the influential Nuggets compilation in the 1970s, and earned a reputation as a protopunk garage rock classic. The song is featured in the Rock and Roll Hall of Fame's exhibit showcasing "The 500 Songs that Shaped Rock and Roll". The Seeds performed "Pushin' Too Hard" during a 1968 episode of the television sitcom The Mothers-in-Law. Saxon revisited the song on his 2008 solo album The King of Garage Rock.

== Composition ==
Sky Saxon wrote "Pushin' Too Hard" while sitting in the front seat of a car waiting for his girlfriend to finish grocery shopping at a supermarket. The lyrics can be interpreted as the protagonist warning his girlfriend against controlling him, or as a rant against society as a whole.

The song contains two chords which alternate throughout, as well as instrumental breaks featuring an electric piano solo played by Daryl Hooper and a guitar solo played by Jan Savage.

The Seeds recorded the song on September 14, 1965 at United Western Recorders in Hollywood, Los Angeles. Saxon produced the song while Harvey Sharpe provided bass. The song only required two takes to be completed, with the master being compiled from an edit of the second.

== Release ==
The Seeds released "You're Pushing Too Hard" as a single in November 1965. Though the song did not chart initially, a Los Angeles disc jockey began playing it extensively following the release of the band's self-titled debut album in April 1966. With the title having been changed to "Pushin' Too Hard", a new single was issued in July 1966 and the song debuted on the Billboard Hot 100 chart in December. It peaked at number 36 in February and spent 11 weeks on the chart.

Some radio stations banned the song, believing that the title dealt with being a pusher of illegal drugs. Conversely, the record reached number one in its tenth week on the playlist of WLS' Silver Dollar Survey on 17 February 1967. Similarly, at rival station WCFL, the record reached number two on the Sound Ten Survey on February 9, 1967.

== Legacy ==
=== Critical reception ===
You're always hoping 'maybe this is a good one.' When Sky actually wrote the lyric to that song it was about a girlfriend he was having trouble with. He initially called us 'flower rock music' 'cause the words are kind of flowery, and...the girls used to toss flowers at us on stage. So it became 'flower power'.

— Daryl Hooper, the Seeds keyboardist, on fans' reaction to "Pushin' Too Hard"

The song was included on 1972's Nuggets: Original Artyfacts from the First Psychedelic Era, 1965–1968, a compilation double album of American garage rock singles that helped influence the development of 1970s punk rock.

Dave Marsh featured the song in his 1989 book The Heart of Rock & Soul: The 1001 Greatest Singles Ever Made.

In 1994, the Rock and Roll Hall of Fame's curatorial staff, along with rock critics and historians, selected "Pushin' Too Hard" as part of a Hall of Fame exhibit featuring "The 500 Songs that Shaped Rock and Roll".

In 2003, a special edition issue of Q magazine, titled "1001 Best Songs Ever", ranked "Pushin' Too Hard" at number 486. The song placed 16th on Paste Magazine's 2014 list of the "50 Best Garage Rock Songs of All Time".

In a retrospective review for AllMusic, Richie Unterberger wrote that "'Pushin' Too Hard' is one of the songs most commonly cited when people are trying to celebrate or denigrate 1960s garage rock, and sometimes championed for precisely the same reasons as others put it down, though in time the critical balance tended toward praising the tune rather than dumping on it."

=== Film and television appearances ===
The Seeds, appearing as fictional band the Warts, performed "Pushin' Too Hard" on a 1968 episode of the television sitcom The Mothers-in-Law.

The song is featured on the soundtracks to the films Air America (1990), 976-Evil II (1992), Wild America (1997), and Easy Rider (2004; expanded edition).

In the second-season episode of Lost titled "The Whole Truth", Jack and Locke listen to the song while Ana Lucia interrogates Henry.

The song featured in a 2012 Nike commercial titled "Game On, World", which pays homage to classic video games. It was used in episode 6 of the 2023 TV series Funny Woman.

=== Other versions ===
In 1967, Brazilian Jovem Guarda singer Wanderléa recorded a version of the song called Vou lhe Contar, with Portuguese lyrics written by Rossini Pinto.

The Residents parodied the song on their 1976 album The Third Reich 'n Roll. Frank Zappa parodied the chorus in his song "Sy Borg", from his 1979 rock opera album Joe's Garage.

Disco singer Paul Parker released a cover of "Pushin' Too Hard" as the B-side to his 1982 single "Right on Target".

Experimental rock group Pere Ubu included a live version of the song on their 1996 box set Datapanik in Year Zero. A version by American rock band the Makers appears on the band's 1997 compilation album Shout On!/Hip-Notic.

Garage rockers the Embarrassment released their rendition of the song on their 2001 album Blister Pop. The Bangles performed "Pushin' Too Hard" for their 2007 live DVD Return to Bangleonia - Live in Concert. A 1978 live version of the song by power pop group the Rubinoos appears on their 2007 compilation album Everything You Always Wanted to Know About the Rubinoos. Sky Saxon re-recorded the song for his 2008 album The King of Garage Rock. The Hitmen covered the song on their 2010 compilation album Dancin' Time '78-'79.

== Track listing ==
7-inch vinyl (1965)

No.	Title	Writer(s)	Length
1.	"(You're) Pushin' Too Hard"	Sky Saxon	2:38
2.	"Out of the Question"	Saxon, Russ Serpent	2:15

7-inch vinyl (1966)

No.	Title	Writer(s)	Length
1.	"Pushin' Too Hard"	Saxon	2:38
2.	"Try to Understand"	Saxon	2:53

== Personnel ==
- Rick Andridge – drums
- Darryl Hooper – keyboards
- Jan Savage – guitars
- Sky Saxon – lead vocals
- Harvey Sharpe – bass guitar

== Chart performance ==
Chart (1967)	Peak position
U.S. Billboard Hot 100	36
U.S. Cash Box Top 100	40
Can. RPM Top 100	44
