= GNP Crescendo Records =

GNP Crescendo Record Co.
- Founded: 1954
- Genre: Jazz, rock, comedy
- Country of origin: U.S.
- Location: Hollywood, California
- Official website: www.gnpcrescendo.com/wp/

GNP Crescendo Record Co. is an independent record label founded in 1954 by Gene Norman (né Eugene Abraham Nabatoff; 1922–2015). It started as a producer of jazz, then expanded into many other genres, including comedy, rock, and Star Trek soundtracks. Currently GNP Crescendo is run by Gene Norman's son, Neil Norman.

== History ==
After hitchhiking from New York to Los Angeles, Norman promoted concerts at the Shrine Auditorium, The Hollywood Bowl and the Pasadena Civic Center, hosted popular radio shows on KFWB and KLAC, and opened his own nightclubs, the Crescendo and The Interlude, on the Sunset Strip. The Crescendo hosted a wide swath of jazz legends and comedians, from Duke Ellington, Ella Fitzgerald and Billie Holiday to Lenny Bruce, Mort Sahl, Don Rickles, Dick Gregory, Woody Allen and Bob Newhart. Norman often paid acts their weekly rate for a single night's engagement.

The inspiration for the label was to issue live recordings made at concerts promoted and organized by Norman, under the umbrella of "Gene Norman Presents". GNP's releases included Louis Armstrong, Dizzy Gillespie, Miles Davis, John Coltrane, Muddy Waters, Lionel Hampton, Stan Kenton, Gerry Mulligan, Frank Morgan (musician), Max Roach, Charlie Ventura and Teddy Buckner.

GNP expanded beyond jazz. In the 1960s, it recorded Billy Strange, the surf band The Challengers and the rock group The Seeds, which landed four singles in the Billboard Hot 100 chart. In the 1980s, GNP gave Robin Trower and Savoy Brown comebacks. In 1982 zydeco musician Queen Ida won the label its first and only Grammy Award out of multiple nominations.

Gene Norman's son Neil, a fan of science fiction, secured a licensing deal from Paramount to release soundtracks of Star Trek, both in its TV and movie incarnations. This led to a new area of concentration for the label. Neil Norman is also a musician who has released many albums on GNP (including numerous albums of themes from science fiction film and television). He also directed feature-length films about GNP artists The Seeds and Rusty Warren. Currently, he is president of the label having started in the mail room and eventually producing many albums.

== Artists ==
- Louis Armstrong
- Big Bill Broonzy
- Savoy Brown
- The Challengers
- Clifton Chenier
- Bing Crosby
- Champion Jack Dupree
- Duke Ellington
- Bobby Enriquez
- John Lee Hooker
- Maurice Jarre
- Bob Kames
- Stan Kenton
- David Matthews
- Memphis Slim
- The Mom and Dads
- Frank Morgan
- Spud Murphy
- Neil Norman
- Jimmy Reed
- Django Reinhardt
- Billy Strange
- Rusty Warren
- Bukka White
- Big Joe Williams
