= U.S. Labor Party =

- Founded: 1973
- Dissolved: 1979
- Succeeded by: National Democratic; Policy Committee
- Ideology: Anti-capitalism; LaRouchism; Marxism (initially)
- Political position: Left-wing; Syncretic (later)
- International affiliation: LaRouche movement

The U.S. Labor Party (USLP) was an American political party formed in 1973 by the National Caucus of Labor Committees (NCLC). It served as a vehicle for Lyndon LaRouche to run for President of the United States in 1976, but it also sponsored many candidates for local offices as well as congressional and Senate seats between 1972 and 1979. After that the political arm of the NCLC was the National Democratic Policy Committee. The party was the subject of a number of controversies and lawsuits during its short existence.

== Party objectives and ideology ==
At first the party was leftist, "preaching Marxist revolution". A state leader described the aims of the party and its organ, New Solidarity, as supporting the working class against capitalism, Nelson Rockefeller, and Leonard Woodcock, head of the United Auto Workers. The USLP predicted collapse of the monetary system by November 1976 and thermonuclear war by 1977. It opposed the Rockefeller family and had a reputation for harassing the Communist Party, the United Auto Workers, and other political foes. In a 1974 interview, the USLP candidate for Governor of Michigan characterized the Watergate scandal as a "deliberate attempt" to discredit Richard Nixon and weaken the presidency. By 1977 the party had shifted from the left to politics of the extreme right, though mixed disparate policies and ideas from both sides made the party overall syncretic.

== History ==
=== 1972–1976 ===
The U.S. Labor Party was noted for its controversial campaign tactics, and its invective campaigns against other politicians. Nelson Rockefeller, the former Governor of New York who was nominated to be vice president by Gerald Ford in 1974, was an early target of the USLP's attention. During the Senate's confirmation hearings, LaRouche appeared on behalf of the USLP as a witness against Rockefeller's nomination. He testified that a USLP survey showed 90 percent of U.S. workers and the unemployed hated Rockefeller.

In 1974 the Wisconsin branch of the Labor Party took out a newspaper advertisement announcing that it had filed for an injunction to prevent the CIA, FBI, and the New York Police Department from arresting Lyndon LaRouche (then known as Lyn Marcus) or anyone involved in the movement's kidnapping of Christopher White, who had married LaRouche's former common-law wife. According to detailed descriptions by LaRouche, White had been brainwashed by the CIA and KGB to kill him. The advertisement further reported that the movement had found a cure for psychosis and encouraged mental health professionals to contact them to develop this discovery. USLP member Harley Schlanger, a candidate for the House of Representatives, sued the Mecklenburg County, North Carolina, ABC Board in August 1976, for prohibiting campaigning on their property, which he contended was public property. The North Carolina ACLU joined the suit. The district court judge decided that the activity was protected free speech that could not be prohibited so long as activists did not block doorways.

One of the U.S. Labor Party's strategies focused on disrupting other left-wing groups, with questionable success. William Chapman wrote in The Washington Post in September 1976 that several public figures on the left had reported threats and intimidation, and said those responsible had identified themselves as members of LaRouche's NCLC or U.S. Labor Party. The linguist and political activist Noam Chomsky was accused of working for the CIA and being a tool of the Rockefellers; meetings he addressed were disrupted, and threats were made. The philosopher Paul Kurtz, editor of The Humanist, was asked during his lectures at the State University of New York why he was practicing genocide. According to Chapman, sociologists Richard Cloward and Frances Fox Piven, specialists on urban poverty, were followed around the country having their speaking tours disrupted. Environmentalist Lester Brown was accused of genocide and told he would be hanged from a lamppost. LaRouche was asked how he expected a party with a five-year record of harassment and threats to win the election; he did not deny the incidents, but replied, "We are only engaged in an open political attack. We just want to challenge them in debate." He denied however that anyone had been threatened with physical harm: "Sure, we're going to get them – but politically."

The U.S. Labor Party was well financed, operating from the top floor of a building in New York's garment district. A teletype network connected the New York office to branches in a further 13 U.S. cities, and also included a two-way, 24-hour link to Wiesbaden, Germany. Membership was small, ranging from 20 to 100 people per city, with a core of 1,000 to 1,800 members; according to LaRouche, these were complemented by another 13,000 part-time party organizers. LaRouche said the party was funded by members' dues, other small contributions, and the sale of publications like The Campaigner and New Solidarity – one a theoretical journal, the other a twice-weekly newspaper. The party fielded candidates in local and congressional elections, generally garnering only insignificant percentages of the popular vote; but there were exceptions – in Seattle, a Labor Party member running for the city council won 27 percent of the vote, with another candidate who ran for city treasurer garnering 20 percent.

=== Presidential campaign ===
In an appearance on Meet the Press with other minor party candidates in October 1976, LaRouche predicted monetary collapse followed by thermonuclear war before summer if Jimmy Carter were elected. LaRouche also described Carter as "a nitwit to begin with, an empty slop jar into which bad lemonade is being poured." However, conservative Republicans like President Ford fared better, incongruously so, given the Labor Party's stated left-wing stance. "I call them honest Americans", LaRouche said. He described Ford as "weak but well-meaning" and "a known quantity we can live with".

On November 1, the eve of the election, the USLP purchased a half-hour block of time on NBC, the first of many national broadcasts by LaRouche that would follow in election years to come. The time was purchased over the objection of the network which unsuccessfully appealed the last-minute purchase to the Federal Election Commission. During the broadcast, which ran opposite a similar advertisement from Carter on another network, LaRouche said that Carter would have the U.S "irreversibly committed to nuclear war by no later than the Summer of 1977" if elected. According to LaRouche's autobiography, he

...blew the policy of James R. Schlesinger, for an early nuclear confrontation with Moscow, and exposed the genocidal policies which key Carter backers, such as George Ball, had publicly demanded as measures for drastic population reduction of nations such as Mexico. More broadly, I presented a policy of international monetary reform, as alternative to a deepening crisis in the developing sector...

NBC reported receiving hundreds of calls protesting the broadcast.

LaRouche's name was on the ballot in 23 states plus the District of Columbia on November 2, 1976. He received 40,043 votes (0.05%). U.S. Labor Party candidates sometimes received unusually high vote totals in comparison with those garnered by other small ideologically-based parties.

Following the election, the USLP brought lawsuits in three states challenging Carter's victory. The Republican Party joined the suits in Ohio and New York. Regional coordinator Paul Greenberg sought a recount in Milwaukee, saying "the election has actually been stolen — the actual winner was probably Jerry Ford."

For more information on LaRouche's 1976 presidential campaign and the movement's legal disputes with the FEC, see Lyndon LaRouche U.S. Presidential campaigns.

=== 1977–1982 ===
In August 1977, the USLP said that the Federal Election Commission (FEC) was intentionally harassing the group as a result of a determination that forgiven debts were the equivalent of campaign contributions. The same month the USLP hired a former OSS and CIA operative, mercenary, firearms engineer and arms dealer, Colonel Mitch WerBell, to protect LaRouche. They said that LaRouche, then living in Wiesbaden, Germany, was being targeted for assassination by the "Baader-Meinhof Gang", allegedly on behalf of the Carter administration. Werbell in turn recruited the chief of police from his town, Powder Springs, Georgia, to set up the security.

In 1978, LaRouche began a vigorous USLP campaign for the presidency in 1980, targeting farmers, small businessmen and Teamsters Union members in the Heartland states.

In May 1978, USLP Steering Committee member Elliott Eisenberg campaigned in a Chicago suburb, saying that "the reason we picked Schaumburg is because it's a relatively conservative area ... There's more of a tendency for people to support nuclear power."

The USLP vice-presidential candidate, Khushro Ghandhi, campaigned in June 1979 and predicted victory based on support from the Teamsters (a faction of the union had ties to LaRouche). Running on a pro-nuclear power platform, Ghandhi said that the recent Three Mile Island accident was ordered by Energy Secretary James R. Schlesinger in order to create a false energy crisis.

By late summer of 1979 the NCLC and LaRouche had decided to join the Democratic Party so that LaRouche could run for that party's presidential nomination, and the U.S. Labor Party was disbanded. In 1982 the USLP was sued for $1.5 million in damages by U.S. News & World Report when one of its employees allegedly impersonated a reporter. The magazine won an injunction against the party publications. Lyndon LaRouche, when asked about the matter, said, "I don't know anything about it and I never looked into it, but I do know that the liberal press uses undercover press practices that are abhorrent and beneath description."

=== Far-right contacts ===
The U.S. Labor Party had contacts with several notable figures on the extreme right wing of American politics. By the late 1970s, members were exchanging almost daily information with Roy Frankhouser, a government informant and infiltrator of both far right and far left groups who was involved with the Ku Klux Klan and the American Nazi Party. The LaRouche organization believed Frankhouser to be a federal agent who had been assigned to infiltrate right-wing and left-wing groups, and that he had evidence that these groups were actually being manipulated or controlled by the FBI and other agencies. LaRouche and his associates considered Frankhouser to be a valuable intelligence contact, and took his links to racist and antisemitic groups to be a cover for his intelligence work. Frankhouser played into these expectations, misrepresenting himself as a conduit for communications to LaRouche from "Mr. Ed", an alleged CIA contact, who did not exist. Frankhouser was convicted in 1975 of conspiring to sell half a ton of dynamite in connection with a school bus bombing that left one man dead, and had marched on Fifth Avenue in New York wearing a Gestapo uniform. LaRouche had organized his defense campaign regarding the dynamite charges. Frankhouser asserted he was working for the government and was sentenced to five years of probation instead of the decades in prison he could have received.

Frankhouser warned LaRouche in 1977 that, according to his claimed CIA contact "Mr. Ed", he was being considered for assassination, and introduced him to Mitchell WerBell III, a noted Office of Strategic Services (OSS) and Central Intelligence Agency (CIA) operative, mercenary, operator of a counterterrorism school, accused drug trafficker, firearms engineer, and arms dealer who said he had an ongoing connection to the CIA. LaRouche developed close ties with WerBell, hiring him as a security consultant for protection against the assumed assassination threat and to train his security staff. It was WerBell who arranged for LaRouche movement members to undergo anti-terrorist training. John George and Laird Wilcox say WerBell learned that the way to keep "LaRouche on the hook was to feed his monstrous ego while jerking his paranoia chain".

Frankhouser cultivated a contact with a media source in New York, enabling him to tip off LaRouche about upcoming stories before they became public. In 1979, Frankhouser was also placed on the payroll as a security consultant, having convinced LaRouche that he was actively connected to U.S. intelligence agencies. A government official later said that Frankhouser was one of the few people who could call LaRouche directly. Forrest Lee Fick, an associate of Frankhouser from the KKK, was added as a consultant in 1982. Fick helped Frankhouser, who was not a competent writer, to compose the memos from "Mr. Ed"; they appeared so authentic that when news about them began to leak out via defectors from LaRouche's security organization, journalists began to speculate about the identity of "Mr. Ed". Frankhouser and Fick later testified that, to justify their $700-per-week paychecks, they had invented their connections to the CIA, written memos purporting to be from CIA agents, and warned of imaginary assassination plots against the LaRouches. George and Wilcox called Frankhouser's deception "one of the biggest hoaxes in the annals of political extremism", made possible by what they called LaRouche's "obsession with conspiracy theories" and intelligence gathering.

The USLP also had brief contact with the Liberty Lobby led by Willis Carto. Carto had some exploratory talks with LaRouche about a joint strategy against the IRS, but the contact was marked by much mutual suspicion. Carto was troubled by the number of Jews in the U.S. Labor Party, and by their adherence to basic socialist positions, including their support for central banking, while Labor Party members considered people in the Liberty Lobby "red-necks" and "idiots".

== Criticism ==
In 1979, a two-part article by Howard Blum and Paul L. Montgomery appeared in the New York Times that accused LaRouche of running a cult. Blum wrote that LaRouche had turned the U.S. Labor Party—with 1,000 members listed in 37 offices in North America, and 26 in Europe and Latin America—into an extreme-right, anti-Semitic organization, despite the presence of Jewish members. The Times alleged that members had taken courses in how to use knives and rifles, and had produced reports for South Africa on anti-apartheid groups in the United States. A farm in upstate New York was allegedly being used for guerrilla training, attended by LaRouche members from Germany and Mexico. Several members also underwent a six-day anti-terrorist training course, at a cost of $200 per person per day, at a camp in Powder Springs, Georgia, run by WerBell.

The Times reported that U.S. Labor Party members were playing a dominant role in a number of companies in Manhattan: Computron Technologies Corporation, which included Mobil Oil and Citibank among its clients; World Composition Services, which the Times wrote had one of the most advanced typesetting complexes in the city and had the Ford Foundation among its clients; and PMR Associates, a printing shop that produced the party's publications and some high school newspapers (see below).

Blum wrote that, from 1976 onwards, party members were transmitting intelligence reports on left-wing members to the FBI and local police. In 1977, he wrote, commercial reports on U.S. anti-apartheid groups were prepared by LaRouche members for the South African government, student dissidents were reported to the Shah of Iran's Savak secret police, and the anti-nuclear movement was investigated on behalf of power companies. He also wrote that LaRouche was telling his membership several times a year that he was being targeted for assassination, including by the Queen, "big-time Zionist mobsters," the Council on Foreign Relations, the Justice Department, and the Mossad.

LaRouche denied the newspaper's charges, and said he had filed a $100 million libel suit. His press secretary said the series was intended "to set up a credible climate for an assassination hit".

The USLP has also been called a "radical and cult-like group". Milton Copulos of The Heritage Foundation described the USLP as "a virulently anti-Semitic outgrowth of the Students for a Democratic Society (SDS)" which used the Fusion Energy Foundation as a front to "win the confidence of unsuspecting businessmen". Washington Post columnist Richard Cohen wrote that the USLP began "on the political left but has since gone so far in the opposite direction that to call it politically right is to slander the entire conservative movement". Labor-union journalist Victor Riesel, while writing of "anti-capitalistic movements, ranging all the way from the Communist Party U.S.A. to the Trotskyite Socialist Workers' Party", said in 1976 "the most extreme activists in this sprawling radicalism are the youthful U.S. Labor Party". Civil Rights activist Julian Bond called the party "a group of leftwing fascists".

LaRouche critic and biographer Dennis King says that when the USLP sponsored LaRouche's 1976 campaign, the NCLC was still in transition from a far-left to far-right ideology but by 1977-1978 both organizations (which were really one and the same for all essential purposes) were advocating extreme-right positions. King described a typical post-transition USLP campaign in Lyndon LaRouche and the New American Fascism (Doubleday, 1989):

In Baltimore, USLP candidate Debra Freeman appealed openly to racist and anti-Semitic sentiments in her 1978 campaign against incumbent Congressman Parren Mitchell, chairman of the Black Congressional Caucus. Freeman, who is white, described Mitchell as a 'house nigger' for Baltimore's 'Zionists' and an example of 'bestiality' in politics....She won more than 11 percent of the vote, doing especially well in several white precincts.

The NCLC had used similar language as early as 1974, when an alderman in Madison, Wisconsin, was called a "house nigger" at a city-council meeting. According to Dennis King, the USLP chairman advocated launching ABC (atomic, biological and chemical) warfare against the Soviet Union as well as the military crushing of Britain (which his newspaper described as the headquarters of the "Zionist-British organism").

== National Democratic Policy Committee ==
National Democratic Policy Committee
- Founded: 1979
- Ideology: LaRouchism
- Political position: Syncretic
- International affiliation: LaRouche movement

After the 1980 campaign, LaRouche established the National Democratic Policy Committee as a vehicle for his and his followers, candidacies." Claiming 2,600 members, the NDPC is a source of considerable dismay within the Democratic National Committee, with which it is often confused. It also indicates LaRouche's new strategy, which is to represent himself as a "conservative Democrat." In fact, it is merely the successor of the now defunct U.S. Labor Party as LaRouche's political arm. and is regarded as the successor to the USLP. LaRouche's politics were not shared by many in the Democratic Party, allowing him to occupy a niche with little competition. A number of state and local candidates have been fielded from within the NDPC's ranks over the past several years. Included among them are Mel Klenetsky, LaRouche's campaign manager, who ran for Mayor of New York, and William Wertz who ran for the U.S. Senate from California in 1982."

== USLP candidates ==
- Nicholas F. Benton gathered petitions in 1978 for Governor of California, but did not appear on the ballot
- Michael Billington, candidate in 1977 for County Executive of Westchester County, New York, in 1978 for New York's 24th congressional district
- Robert Bowen, candidate in 1975 for New Jersey's 34th legislative district, in 1976 for New Jersey's 1st congressional district, in 1978 for U.S. Senate from New Jersey.
- Elijah C. (Zeke) Boyd, candidate in 1974 and 1976 for U.S. Senate from New York, in 1977 for Mayor of New York City
- Anton Chaitkin, candidate in 1973 for Mayor of New York City, in 1974 for Governor of New York, in 1978 for Pennsylvania's 2nd congressional district
- Wayne Evans, candidate in 1975 for Lieutenant Governor of Michigan, in 1976 for Vice President of the United States
- Paul Gallagher, candidate in 1977 for 1977 New York City Council President, in 1978 for New York's 18th congressional district, in 1978 for Governor of New York
- Khushro Ghandi, candidate in 1974 for Michigan House of Representatives 18th district, in 1977 for Mayor of Buffalo, New York, in 1978 for New York's 37th congressional district.
- Elliott Greenspan, candidate in 1975 for New Jersey's 13th legislative district, in 1976 for New Jersey's 4th congressional district, in 1978 for New Jersey's 7th congressional district
- Mel Klenetsky, candidate in 1978 for Governor of Illinois, candidate in 1981 for Mayor of New York City
- H. Graham Lowry, candidate in 1976 for U.S. Senate from Massachusetts, in 1978 for Massachusetts's 11th congressional district
- J. Philip Rubinstein, candidate in 1978 for Lieutenant Governor of New York
- Harley Schlanger, candidate in 1976 for North Carolina's 9th congressional district
- William Wertz, candidate in 1976 for U.S. Senate from Washington

=== NDPC candidates and personnel ===
This list includes those who have been identified as holding a position within the NDPC and candidates who have run in two or more races, won primaries, or have otherwise gained attention while running NDPC candidates or otherwise identified as "LaRouche Democrats".

- Ted Andromidas, candidate in 1983 for Los Angeles City Council, in 1990 for California's 29th congressional district, in 1994 for U.S. Senate from California
- Mark Calney, Northwest coordinator for the NDPC, candidate in 1983 for Seattle City Council, in 1984 for Governor of Washington, 1985 for Mayor of Seattle, Washington, in 1990 for Governor of California, in 1992 for California's 30th congressional district, in 1994 for Governor of California
- James J. Cleary, candidate in 1984 for New Jersey's 8th congressional district, in 1986 for New Jersey's 7th congressional district, in 1990 for New Jersey's 12th congressional district, in 1994 for New Jersey's 7th congressional district (with the "LaRouche Was Right" party)
- Michael DiMarco, candidate in 1983 for New Jersey's 7th legislative district, in 1984 for New Jersey's 13th congressional district, in 1992 for New Jersey's 4th congressional district (with LaRouche's "Democrats for Economic Recovery" party).
- Mark Fairchild, candidate in 1986 for Lieutenant Governor of Illinois (won the Democratic primary), in 1990 for Governor of Illinois
- William Ferguson, candidate in 1983 for School Committee in Boston, Massachusetts, in 1994 for U.S. Senate from Massachusetts (with the "LaRouche Was Right" party), in 2001 for Massachusetts's 9th congressional district
- Lawrence Freeman, candidate in 1994 and in 1998 for Governor of Maryland
- Khushro Ghandi, West Coast coordinator of NDPC, candidate in 1983 for Los Angeles City Council, in 1989 for Mayor of Los Angeles., in 1989 for California Lieutenant Governor
- Bill G. Goff, candidate in 1986 for Michigan State Senate (won Democratic Party primary)
- Paul Goldstein, chief of security
- James A. Green, candidate in 1986 for Michigan State Senate (won Democratic Party primary)
- Elliott Greenspan, Executive Director of the NDPC, candidate in 1983 for New Jersey's 38th legislative district, in 1984 for U.S. Senate from New Jersey, in 1985 for Governor of New Jersey, candidate in 1986 for New Jersey's 9th congressional district, in 2001 for Governor of New Jersey
- Janice Hart, candidate in 1986 for Secretary of State of Illinois (won the Democratic primary), in 1988 for Clerk of Circuit Court for Cook County, Illinois
- Warren Hamerman, NDPC Chairman
- Art Hoffmann, candidate in 1984 for California's 39th congressional district, in 1986 for California's 40th congressional district (initial results showed that Hoffman won the Democratic Party primary, but a recount gave the victory to a write-in candidate), in 1989 for a seat on the Santa Ana Unified School District board of trustees, in 1990 for California's 38th congressional district. He also ran for the Orange Unified School District board and the Rancho Santiago College board of trustees in unknown years.
- Georgia Irey, candidate in 1984 for California's 45th congressional district, in 1986 for U.S. Senate from Indiana
- Sheila Jones, Midwest director for the NDPC, candidate in 1986 for U.S. Senate from Illinois, in 1987 for Mayor of Chicago, in 1988 for Cook County recorder of deeds, in 1989 for Mayor of Chicago, in 1990 for Lieutenant Governor of Illinois, in 1991 for Mayor of Chicago, in 1994 for Governor of Illinois, in 1995 for Mayor of Chicago
- Mel Klenetsky, co-director of political operations for the NDPC, national campaign director for LaRouche, candidate in 1982 for U.S. Senate from New York
- Brian Lantz, founding member and Northern California director of the NDPC, candidate in 1986 for U.S. Senate from California, in 1987 for California's 5th congressional district
- Evelyn Lantz, member of PANIC, candidate in 1983 for California's 5th congressional district, in 1986 for California's 9th congressional district, in 1994 for U.S. Senate from Texas and for state Democratic Party chair, in 1998 for U.S. Senate from Texas
- Mel Logan, candidate in 2000 for U.S. Senate from Wyoming (won the Democratic Party primary)
- Rose-Marie Love, candidate in 1986 for Mayor of Chicago, in 1992 for Illinois's 7th congressional district (with LaRouche's "Economic Recovery Party"), in 1994 for Secretary of State of Illinois
- Fernando Oliver, candidate in 1986 for Lieutenant Governor of New York (later removed from ballot by court order)
- J. Philip Rubinstein, President of Caucus Distributors, Northeast Regional Director of the NDPC, candidate in 1985 for Mayor of New York, in 1986 for Governor of New York (later removed from ballot by court order)
- Dana Scanlon, spokeswoman for NDPC
- Harley Schlanger, Southwest coordinator of NDPC, candidate in 1984 for U.S. Senate for Texas, in 1986 for Texas's 8th congressional district, in 1990 for U.S. Senate for Texas
- Don Scott, candidate in 1984 for Ohio's 7th congressional district, in 1986 for U.S. Senate from Ohio, in 1990 for Ohio's 7th congressional district
- Lewis duPont Smith, candidate in 1988 for New Hampshire's 2nd congressional district, in 1990 for Pennsylvania's 5th congressional district, in 1994 for Minnesota Attorney General, in 1998 for New Jersey's 4th congressional district
- Nancy Spannaus, candidate in 1990 for U.S. Senate from Virginia, in 1993 for Governor of Virginia, in 1994 for U.S. Senate from Virginia, in 1996 for U.S. Senate from Virginia, in 2002 for U.S. Senate from Virginia
- Webster Tarpley, candidate in 1986 for U.S. Senate from New York (later removed from ballot by court order)
- Philip Valenti, candidate in 1992 for U.S. Senate from Pennsylvania, in 1994 for Pennsylvania governor
- William Wertz, candidate in 1982 for U.S. Senate from California, in 1983 for Los Angeles City Council

== See also ==
- Views of Lyndon LaRouche and the LaRouche movement

== Sources ==
- Blum, Howard; Montgomery, Paul L. (October 7, 1979). "U.S. Labor Party: Cult Surrounded by Controversy" (PDF). The New York Times.
- George, John; Wilcox, Laird (1992). Nazis, Communists, Klansmen, and Others on the Fringe: Political Extremism in America. Buffalo: Prometheus Books. ISBN 978-0-87975-680-2.
- George, John; Wilcox, Laird (1996). American Extremists: Militias, Supremacists, Klansmen, Communists & Others (2nd ed.). Amherst: Prometheus Books. ISBN 978-1-57392-058-2.
- van Deerlin, Lionel (March 24, 1986). "Kooks right out of the Twilight Zone". The Tribune. San Diego. p. B7.
