= Views of Lyndon LaRouche and the LaRouche movement =

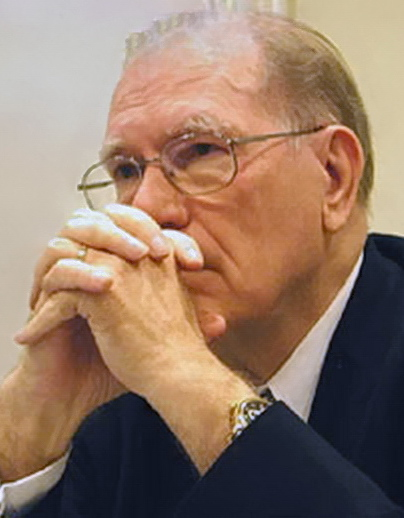
Lyndon LaRouche, 2006

The American political activist Lyndon LaRouche (1922–2019) and the LaRouche movement have expressed controversial views on a wide variety of topics. The LaRouche movement is made up of activists who follow LaRouche's views.

LaRouche's economic policies call for a program modeled on the economic recovery program of the Franklin D. Roosevelt administration, including fixed exchange rates, capital controls, exchange controls, currency controls, and protectionist price and trade agreements among partner-nations, although Roosevelt generally pursued trade liberalization. LaRouche also called for a reorganization of debt world-wide, and a global plan for large-scale, continental infrastructure projects. LaRouche rejected free trade, deregulation, and globalization.

== Economics and politics ==
According to Matko Meštrović, emeritus senior research fellow at the Institute of Economics of Zagreb, Croatia, LaRouche's economic policies call for a program modeled on the economic-recovery program of the Franklin D. Roosevelt administration, including fixed exchange rates, capital controls, exchange controls, currency controls, and protectionist price and trade agreements among partner-nations, although Roosevelt generally pursued trade liberalization. LaRouche also called for a reorganization of debt world-wide, and a global plan for large-scale, continental infrastructure projects. He rejects free trade, deregulation, and globalization.

=== Marxist roots ===
Lyndon LaRouche began his political career as a Trotskyist and praised Marxism, but he and the National Caucus of Labor Committees abandoned this ideology in the late 1970s. From then on, LaRouche no longer opposed private ownership of the means of production, and his analysis of political events is no longer phrased in terms of class.

According to Tim Wohlforth, during and after his break with Trotskyism, LaRouche's theory was influenced by what he called his "Theory of Hegemony" derived from Vladimir Lenin's view of the role of intellectuals in being a vanguard helping workers develop their consciousness and realize their leading role in society. He was influenced by Antonio Gramsci's concept of hegemony as an intellectual and cultural elite which directs social thought. LaRouche's theory saw himself and his followers as becoming such a hegemonic force. He rejected Gramsci's notion of "organic intellectuals" being developed by the working class itself. Rather, the working class would be led by elite intellectuals such as himself.

LaRouche was influenced by his readings of Rosa Luxemburg's The Accumulation of Capital and Karl Marx's Capital developing his own "theory of reindustrialization", saying that the West would attempt to industrialize the Third World, particularly India, and attempt to solve the economic crisis both by developing new markets in the Third World and using its cheap and surplus labor to increase profits and minimize costs (see neocolonialism). To oppose this, LaRouche argued for a "reindustrialization" of the United States with himself at the vanguard of the effort allowing him to personally resolve the crisis of capitalism. Though his arguments had since been stripped of their Marxist language and citations, his core theories had remained essentially the same since the late 1960s.

==== Dialectical Economics ====
In the book Dialectical Economics: An Introduction to Marxist Political Economy, which was published in 1975 by D. C. Heath and Company under the pen name Lyn Marcus, LaRouche tried to show that numerous Marxists—ranging from the Monthly Review group to Ernest Mandel, Vladimir Lenin, Leon Trotsky, Joseph Stalin, Mao Zedong, Fidel Castro and the "Soviet economists"—had failed to understand and to interpret correctly Marx's writing. Marxists he admired—apart from Marx himself—were Rosa Luxemburg and Yevgeni Preobrazhensky.

According to a review by Martin Bronfenbrenner in The Journal of Political Economy, about half of the book was devoted to dialectical philosophy, "with a strong epistemological stress", with the other half devoted to discussions of economic and general history, anthropology and sociology, and actual economics, including a surprisingly large helping of business administration—Bronfenbrenner noted that LaRouche seemed to have "more private-business experience than the great majority of academic economists", including a familiarity with the way speculative overcapitalization, operating at the borders of white-collar crime, creates "fictitious capitals" that later do not match their actual earning power. Like Thorstein Veblen, LaRouche subscribed to an overcapitalization theory of economic depression.

According to Bronfenbrenner, LaRouche viewed conventional economics as a "withered arm of philosophy", which had taken a wrong turn toward reductionism under the influence of British empiricists such as John Locke and David Hume. LaRouche's definition of reductionism was as follows:

The fundamental fallacy of ordinary understanding is the delusion that the universe is reducible to simple substance, or—the more Hume-like view—that the content of human knowledge is limited to simple-substance-like, self-evident sense perceptions. This discredited outlook—whether it takes the naive mechanistic [form] or the equivalent mechanistic outlook of empiricism—is termed reductionism. All varieties of reductionism are formally premised on the fallacious assumption of formal logic, that the universe can be represented as discrete points interconnected by formal relations.

From this it followed, Bronfenbrenner said, that LaRouche viewed bourgeois economists' concern with prices as reductionism, versus the Marxian concern with values. The reductionist fallacy then lies in adjusting a value theory like labor theory to fit in with price theory; in LaRouche's view, economists should work in the opposite direction.

According to Bronfenbrenner, LaRouche viewed capitalist America as headed for a kind of fascism not much better than that of the Nazis; but he noted that LaRouche's own vision of socialism, and the trade-off between necessity and freedom in a centrally planned economy, seemed apt to result in the justification of a different kind of dictatorship:

Judging from his controversial manner, [LaRouche] impresses at least one reader as a Me-for-Dictator type to whom it would be dangerous to entrust the task of drawing any boundary between the domain of freedom and that of necessity or order.

=== LaRouche's campaign platforms ===
The campaign platforms of LaRouche and his followers have included these elements:

- A return to a gold-based national and world monetary system, and fixed exchange rates; and replacement of the central bank system, including the U.S. Federal Reserve System, with a "national bank";
- A war on drug trafficking and prosecution of banks involved in money laundering;
- An emphasis on large-scale economic infrastructure, including the building of a world land bridge of railroads and a tunnel under the Bering Strait, the building of nuclear power plants, accelerating research on fusion energy, the North American Water and Power Alliance, and rebuilding or nationalizing the country's steel industry;
- A crash program to build particle-beam weapons and lasers, including support for elements of the Strategic Defense Initiative (SDI);
- Opposition to the USSR and support for a military buildup to prepare for imminent war;
- Growth in food production and a farm debt moratorium;
- Low interest rates and opposition to the Gramm–Rudman balanced-budget law;

=== Later orientation ===
According to China Youth Daily Online, LaRouche was once a Marxist, but later supported heavily regulated capitalism. He supported public control of financial capital and low-interest loans.

LaRouche said banks should not be bailed out, but be placed in receivership by the state. He said that a "firewall" should prevent state aid from being diverted to speculative entities, which should be allowed to fail, and that such failures would clean up the financial markets.

LaRouche expressed belief in the principles of the New Deal of President Franklin D. Roosevelt, favoring state intervention in the economy. LaRouche also stated support for the approach of U.S. Treasury Secretary Alexander Hamilton, who established a banking system geared to develop production.

Italian Economics Minister Giulio Tremonti said that he had encountered LaRouche at a debate held in 2007 in Rome, and that he appreciates LaRouche's writings. According to an article by Ivo Caizzi in Corriere della Sera, a group of Italian Senators led by Oskar Peterlini asked the Berlusconi government to tackle the financial crisis using legislation developed by LaRouche in 2007. The legislation proposed that public money should save only the commercial infrastructure required for the financing of productive enterprises.

The "Triple Curve", or "typical collapse function", is an economic model developed by LaRouche which tries to illustrate the growth of financial aggregates at the expense of the physical economy and how this leads to an inevitably collapsing bubble economy. According to the China Youth Daily Online interview, LaRouche's main point is that the real economy (production) is dropping while the nominal economy (money and financial instruments) is going up. As the nominal economy greatly overreaches the real economy, an unavoidable economic crisis ensues.

Since 2000, the LaRouche movement has:

- Called for a moratorium on Third World debt.
- Opposed deregulation. According to LaRouche's publications, "LaRouche has consistently called for reregulation of utilities, transportation, health care (under the "Hill-Burton" standard), the financial (especially the speculative markets) and other sectors ..." They support the renewal of Glass–Steagall Act regulations on banks.
- In 2007, LaRouche proposed a "Homeowners and Bank Protection Act". This called for the establishment of a federal agency that would "place federal- and state-chartered banks under protection, freeze all existing home mortgages for a period of time, adjust mortgage values to fair prices, restructure existing mortgages at appropriate interest rates, and write off speculative debt obligations of mortgage-backed securities". The bill envisioned a foreclosure moratorium, allowing homeowners to make the equivalent of rental payments for an interim period, and an end to bank bail-outs, forcing banks to reorganize under bankruptcy laws. A LaRouche spokesman said that bank bail-outs "reward corrupt swindlers with taxpayer money". The proposal attracted support from Democrats at city council and state legislature level. Pennsylvania Democrat Paul Kanjorski opposed the bill, stating it would involve government seizure of "every American bank". Mike Colpitts of Housing Predictor stated that LaRouche's economic forecasts had been correct, and that he might have received more mainstream credibility had it not been for his controversial history.

== Neoplatonism ==
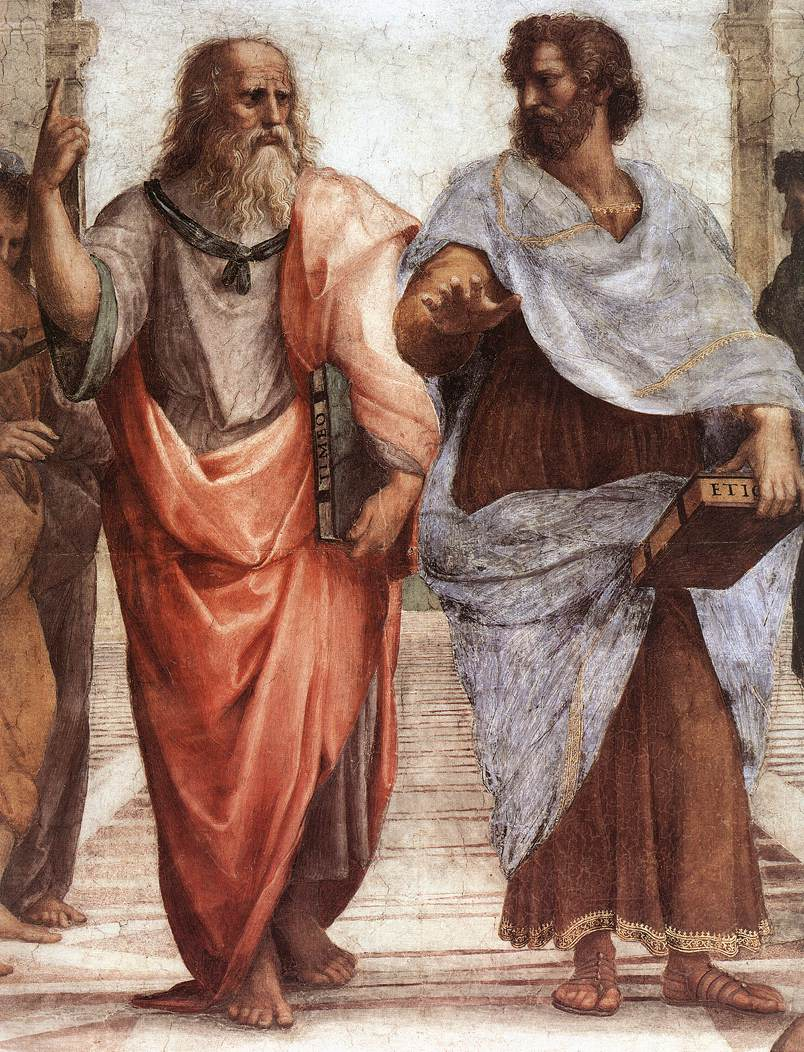
LaRouche references an old dispute between Plato (left) and Aristotle (right), here illustrated in a fresco by Raphael. Aristotle gestures to the earth, representing his belief in knowledge through empirical observation. Plato gestures to the heavens, representing his belief in The Forms.

LaRouche's philosophy references an old dispute between Plato and Aristotle. Aristotle believed in knowledge through empirical observation and experience. Plato believed in The Forms. According to LaRouche, history has always been a battle between Platonists—rationalists, idealists and utopians who believe in absolute truth and the primacy of ideas—and Aristotelians—relativists who rely on empirical data and sensory perception. Platonists in LaRouche's worldview include figures such as Beethoven, Mozart, Shakespeare, Leonardo da Vinci, and Leibniz. LaRouche states that many of the world's ills are due to the fact that Aristotelianism, as embraced by British philosophers like Locke, Hume, Thomas Hobbes, Jeremy Bentham and represented by "oligarchs", foremost among them wealthy British families, has dominated, leading to a culture that favors the empirical over the metaphysical, embraces moral relativism, and seeks to keep the general population uninformed. LaRouche frames this struggle as an ancient one, and sees himself and his movement in the tradition of the philosopher-kings in Plato's Republic.

LaRouche and his followers use Neoplatonism as the basis for an economic model that posits "the absolute necessity of progress". Economies evolve in stages as humanity devises new technologies, stages that LaRouche compares to the hierarchical spheres in Kepler's model of the solar system based on the Platonic solids. The purpose of science, technology and business must be to assist this progress, enabling the Earth to support an ever-growing humanity. Human life is the supreme value in LaRouche's world view; environmentalism and population control are seen as retrogressive steps, promoting a return to the Dark Ages. Rather than curtailing progress, because of dwindling resources, LaRouche advocates using nuclear technology to make more energy available to humanity, freeing humanity to enjoy music and art.

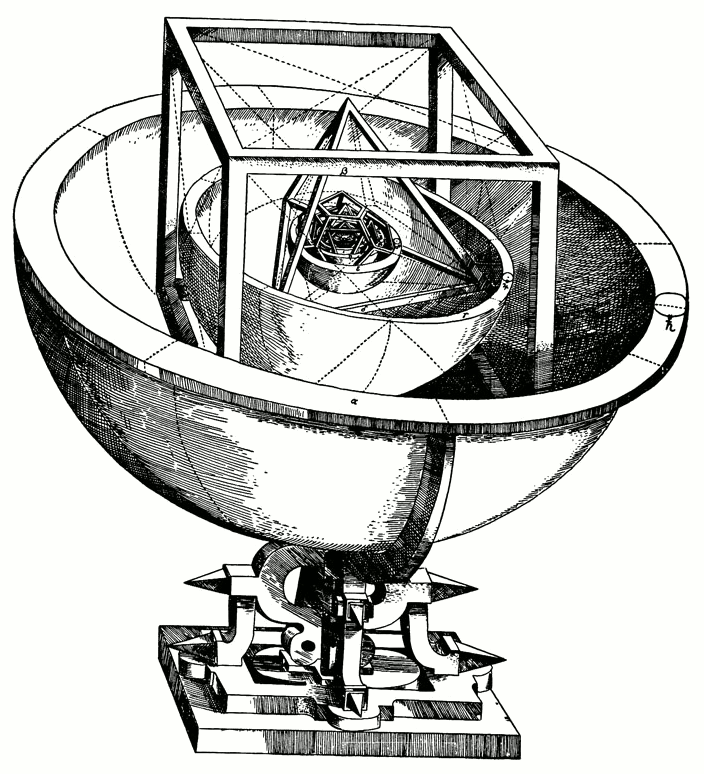
Kepler's Platonic solid model of the solar system from Mysterium Cosmographicum (1596)

In LaRouche's view, the people opposing this vision are part of the Aristotelian formation. They may not necessarily be in contact with one another: "From their standpoint, [the Aristotelians] are proceeding by instinct", LaRouche has said. "If you're asking how their policy is developed—if there is an inside group sitting down and making plans—no, it doesn't work that way ... History doesn't function quite that consciously." Left and right are false distinctions for LaRouche; what matters is the Platonic versus Aristotelian outlook, a position that has led LaRouche to form relationships with groups as disparate as farmers, nuclear engineers, Black Muslims, Teamsters, pro-lifers, and followers of the Ku Klux Klan—even though LaRouche counts the Klan itself among his foes.

George Johnson, in Architects of Fear (1983), has described LaRouche's Neoplatonist conspiracy theory as a "distortion of a real philosophical distinction". He has written that the resulting philosophy can be applied to any number of situations in a manner that becomes plausible once one accepts its basic premise. In his view, it forms the foundation of a conspiracy theory that rationalizes paranoid thinking, an opinion echoed by John George and Laird Wilcox in American Extremists: Militias, Supremacists, Klansmen, Communists & Others (1996). Writing in The New York Times in 1989, Johnson described LaRouche as "a kind of Allan Bloom gone mad" who seems to "believe the nonsense he spouts", a view of the world in which Aristotelians use "sex, drugs and rock-and-roll" and "environmentalism and quantum theory" to support wealthy oligarchs and create a civilization-destroying "new Dark Age".

== Conspiracies ==
LaRouche wrote that conspiracy was natural in human beings. In 1998, he responded to critics of his conspiracism, such as Daniel Pipes, and said that Pipes wrongly believed that all reports of conspiracy are axiomatically false.

LaRouche's critics, particularly Dennis King and Chip Berlet, characterize his current orientation as being a conspiracist worldview. They say the Marxist concept of the ruling class was converted by LaRouche into a conspiracy theory, in which world capitalism was controlled by a cabal including the Rothschilds, the Rockefellers, Henry Kissinger, and the Council on Foreign Relations. Daniel Pipes said that LaRouche personalizes his conspiracy theories, and associates "all of his adversaries with the forces of darkness."

The Executive Intelligence Review (EIR), a LaRouche publication, ran an "investigative report" titled "Vast Right-Wing Conspiracy At It Again, With a New Twist" in 2007. The article states:

Perhaps the only name that sends the VRWC gang more into orbit than either Bill and Hillary Clinton, is the name Lyndon LaRouche. The very same apparatus that waged a billion-dollar slander campaign against the President and the First Lady throughout much of the mid- and late 1990s, has an even longer track record of venomous slander and frame-up campaigns against LaRouche and his political movement. Of course, the reality is that it was the Bush-Cheney campaign, backed by the Scalia Supreme Court, that actually stole the 2000 election in Florida.

In 2001, LaRouche said that rogue elements within the American military took part in, or planned, the September 11, 2001, attacks as part of a coup d'état.

=== The "British" conspiracy ===
LaRouche is known for alleging conspiracies by the British. LaRouche has said that the dominant imperialist strategic force acting on the planet today is not the United States, but the "Anglo-Dutch liberal system" of the British Empire, which he asserts is an oligarchic financial consortium like that of medieval Venice, more like a "financial slime-mold" than a nation. According to this theory, London financial circles protect themselves from competition by using techniques of "controlled conflict" first developed in Venice, and LaRouche attributes many wars in recent memory to this alleged activity by the British.

According to Chip Berlet and Dennis King, LaRouche has always been stridently anti-British and has included Queen Elizabeth II, the British Royal Family, and others, in his list of conspirators who are said to control the world's political economy and the international drug trade. According to Jonathan Vankin and John Whalen, LaRouche is the "most illustrious" Anglophobe. These views are reflected in three books authored by members of his organization:

- Dope, Inc. by David P. Goldman, Konstandinos Kalimtgis and Jeffrey Steinberg, 1978 (ISBN 0-918388-08-2): this book discusses the history of narcotics trafficking, beginning with the Opium War, and alleges that British interests have continued to dominate the field up to the modern era, for example through money laundering in British offshore banking colonies. The heart of the conspiracy, according to LaRouche, is the financial elite of the City of London.
- The Civil War and the American System by Allen Salisbury, 1979 (ISBN 0918388023): alleges that British interests encouraged and financed the secession movement and supported the Confederacy against the Union in the American Civil War, because they preferred North America to be a primitive agrarian economy that they could dominate through policies of free trade.
- The New Dark Ages Conspiracy by Carol White, 1980 (ISBN 0-933488-05-X): alleges that a group of British intellectuals led by Bertrand Russell and H. G. Wells attempted to control scientific progress in order to keep the world backward and more easily managed by imperialism. In this conspiracy theory, Wells wished science to be controlled by some kind of priesthood and kept from the common man, while Russell wished to stifle it altogether by restricting it to a closed system of formal logic, that would prohibit the introduction of new ideas. This conspiracy also involved the promotion of the counterculture.

==== The Queen and Prince Philip ====
According to book critic and columnist Scott McLemee:

The emergence of the [LaRouche Youth Movement] is all the more surprising, given that LaRouche himself has long since become the walking punchline to a very strange joke. He is known for some of the most baroque conspiracy theories ever put into circulation. Members of the LYM now deny that he ever accused the Queen of England of drug trafficking—though in fact, he did exactly that throughout the 1980s. At the time, he won admirers on the extreme right wing by denouncing Henry Kissinger as an agent of the KGB and calling for AIDS patients to be quarantined.

In 2004, in a segment about the death of Jeremiah Duggan during a LaRouche Youth Movement cadre school in Wiesbaden in March 2003, BBC's Newsnight re-broadcast a BBC interview with LaRouche from 1980, in which he said about the Queen: "Of course she's pushing drugs. That is, in the sense of a responsibility, the head of a gang that is pushing drugs, she knows it's happening and she isn't stopping it."

A 1998 editorial in LaRouche's Executive Intelligence Review cited a statement by Ambrose Evans-Pritchard in The Daily Telegraph that described LaRouche as the "publisher of a book that accuses the Queen of being the world's foremost drug dealer", characterising it as a "bit of black propaganda" and a "reference to the book Dope, Inc., ... which laid bare the role of the London-centered offshore financial institutions and allied intelligence services, in running the global drug trade, from the time of Britain's nineteenth-century Opium Wars against China." Evans-Pritchard further said LaRouche had claimed that the Queen was involved in the Death of Diana, Princess of Wales. The Executive Intelligence Review responded that Evans-Pritchard's article was "pure fiction", written in response to EIR reporter Jeff Steinberg's appearance on a British ITV television program about the conspiracy theories surrounding the death of Diana, Princess of Wales. In a brief part of an interview with Steinberg broadcast the following day by Channel 4's Dispatches, Steinberg said that while there was "no smoking gun proof" that Prince Philip asked British intelligence to assassinate Diana, he could not "rule out" the possibility.

=== Leo Strauss ===
LaRouche's initial essay on the influence of Leo Strauss within neoconservatism and the George W. Bush administration, "The Essential Fraud of Leo Strauss", was written in March 2003. In the same year, a series of pamphlets entitled "Children of Satan" later consolidated into a book, began appearing. LaRouche charges that there was a conspiracy dominated by what are called Straussians (followers of Leo Strauss) within the Bush administration, and that the dominant personality in this conspiracy was Dick Cheney (whose photo appears on the cover of the book.) LaRouche claimed that these conspirators deliberately misled the American public and the US Congress in order to initiate the 2003 invasion of Iraq. He writes that the Straussians created the Office of Special Plans in order to fabricate intelligence and bypass traditional intelligence channels. According to LaRouche movement member Tony Papert, an important part of this theory is the LaRouchian analysis of the ideas of Leo Strauss which borrows heavily from the writings of Shadia Drury.

Robert Bartley of The Wall Street Journal has condemned LaRouche's views on this subject, and says that it may have influenced other commentators who subsequently published a similar analysis, such as Seymour Hersh and James Atlas in their articles for The New York Times. Bartley quotes the assertion by LaRouche movement member Jeffrey Steinberg that a "cabal of Strauss disciples, along with an equally small circle of allied neo-conservative and Likudnik fellow-travelers" have plotted a "not-so-silent coup" using the September 11 attacks as a justification, similar to the Reichstag fire of 1933. Bartley complains that Strauss's "words are twisted from their meaning" in order to justify the theory. Canadian journalist Jeet Heer has commented that LaRouche's followers "argue that Strauss is the evil genius behind the Republican Party". Political science scholars Catherine and Michael Zuckert say that LaRouche's writings were the first to connect Strauss to neoconservatism and the Bush foreign policy and initiated the discussion of the topic, though the views about it changed as it percolated through to international journalism.

=== Bush family ===
The Executive Intelligence Review (EIR) published an article by Anton Chaitkin alleging that Prescott Bush "had persevered with his comrades in the old Auschwitz gang" and that "the smoldering bodies in Auschwitz followed logically upon the race propaganda festival which had been staged by the Harriman-Bush enterprise a decade earlier in New York."

EIR published a book, George Bush: The Unauthorized Biography, by Webster Griffin Tarpley and Anton Chaitkin, in 1992, which said that "virtually all the Nazi trade with the United States was under the supervision of the Harriman-Bush interests", and that "Bush's family had already played a central role in financing and arming Adolf Hitler for his takeover of Germany; in financing and managing the buildup of Nazi war industries for the conquest of Europe and war against the U.S.A.; and in the development of Nazi genocide theories and racial propaganda, with their well-known results. ... The President's family fortune was largely a result of the Hitler project. The powerful Anglo-American family associations, which later boosted him into the Central Intelligence Agency and up to the White House, were his father's partners in the Hitler project."

In 2006, The LaRouche Political Action Committee and EIR published "LaRouche to Rumsfeld: FDR Defeated the Nazis, While Bushes Collaborated", which stated:

LaRouche blasted Rumsfeld, reminding him that it was President Franklin Delano Roosevelt who defeated Hitler and the Nazis, while many American right-wingers of the 1930s and '40s were promoters of Mussolini, Hjalmar Schacht, and Hermann Goering. And among the extreme American Fascists and Nazis of the period, there were some who openly sympathized with Adolf Hitler, by intention or practice. "Let us not ignore the role of George Shultz, the man behind the Bush Presidency, the power of Vice President Cheney, and the promotion of Don Rumsfeld as Secretary of Defense. Even leading Republicans know Shultz to be an outright totalitarian, who has used the Bush Presidency to impose a 'Pinochet Model' of top-down dictatorship and radical free-market economics upon the United States. Shultz's promotion of the privatization of war, on the SS model, has been backed", LaRouche noted, "by Felix Rohatyn."

== PANIC proposal and AIDS ==
In 1974, an organisation affiliated to LaRouche predicted that there would be pandemics in Africa. When AIDS was first recognized as a medical phenomenon in the early 1980s, LaRouche activists were convinced that this was the pandemic about which the task force had warned. LaRouche and his followers stated (incorrectly) that HIV, the AIDS virus, could be transmitted by casual contact, citing as supporting evidence the high incidence of the disease in Africa, the Caribbean and southern Florida. LaRouche said that the transmission by insect bite was "thoroughly established". John Grauerholz, medical director of the BHTF, told reporters that the Soviet Union may have started the epidemic and that U.S. health officials aided the Soviets by not doing more to stop AIDS.

AIDS became a key plank in LaRouche's platform. His slogan was "Spread Panic, not AIDS!" LaRouche's followers created "Prevent AIDS Now Initiative Committee" (PANIC), which sponsored California Proposition 64, the "LaRouche Initiative", in 1986. Mel Klenetsky, co-director of political operations for the Larouche-affiliated National Democratic Policy Committee and LaRouche's campaign director, said that there must be universal testing and mandatory quarantining of HIV carriers. "Twenty to 30 million out of 100 million people in central Africa have AIDS", Klenetsky said. "It is spreading because of impoverished economic conditions, and that is a direct result of IMF policies that have destroyed people's means of resisting the disease." Klenetsky said that LaRouche believed that not only drug users and homosexuals are vulnerable to the disease.

The measure was met with strong opposition and was defeated. A second AIDS initiative qualified for the ballot in 1988, but the measure failed by a larger margin. In response to a survey which predicted that 72% of voters would oppose the measure, a spokesman called the poll "an obvious fraud", saying that pollsters deliberately worded questions to prejudice respondents against the initiative. He additionally said that the poll was part of a "big lie ... witch hunt" orchestrated by Armand Hammer and Elizabeth Taylor.

As early as 1985, NDPC members ran for local school boards on a platform of keeping infected students out of school. In 1986, LaRouche supporters traveled from Seattle to Lebanon, Oregon to urge the school board there to reverse a policy that would allow children with AIDS to enroll. In 1987, followers tried to organize a boycott of an elementary school in the Chicago neighborhood of Pilsen, sending a van with loudspeakers through the district. They disrupted an informational meeting and, according to press accounts, told parents that "The blood of your own children will be on your hands if you allow this child with AIDS in your school", or shouted at opponents, "He has AIDS! He has AIDS!"

LaRouche purchased a national TV spot during his 1988 presidential campaign, in which he summarized his views and proposals with respect to the AIDS epidemic. He said most statements about how AIDS is spread were an "outright lie" and that talk of safe sex was just propaganda put out by the government to avoid spending the money required to address the crisis.

The AIDS disinformation of the LaRouche movement occurred during the Soviets' Operation "INFEKTION" propaganda campaign. According to researcher Douglas Selvage, "a cycle of misinformation and disinformation... arose between U.S.-based conspiracy theorists—especially Lyndon LaRouche and his followers—and authors and publications espousing Moscow's preferred theses regarding AIDS."

LaRouche-affiliated candidates used AIDS as an issue as late as 1994.

Opponents characterized it as an anti-gay measure that would force HIV-positive individuals out of their jobs and into quarantine, or create "concentration camps for AIDS patients." According to newspaper reports, the LaRouche newspaper New Solidarity said the initiative was opposed by Communist gangs composed of the "lower sexual classes" and he warned of the recruitment of millions of Americans into the ranks of "AIDS-riddled homosexuality".

== Environment and energy ==
Meštrović says LaRouche followed Vladimir Vernadsky in seeing the human mind as a force transforming the biosphere into a higher form, the noösphere. LaRouche favored a highly industrialized civilization reaching for innovation and interplanetary colonization. The movement said that the theory of man-caused global warming prevents the development of emerging economies. It also said that the top level organizations in the command structure of the environmental movement include the World Wildlife Fund, headed by Prince Philip, the Aspen Institute, and the Club of Rome.

According to Chip Berlet, "Pro-LaRouche publications have been at the forefront of denying the reality of global warming". The LaRouche movement's 21st Century Science & Technology magazine has been called "anti-environmental" by Mother Jones magazine. LaRouche publications denounced the concept of a nuclear winter, the theory that nuclear war could lead to global cooling, as early as 1983, calling it a "fraud" and a "hoax" popularized by the Soviet Union to weaken the U.S. Some of the movement's ideas were later adopted by the Wise use movement. The LaRouche movement opposed ratification of the Convention on Biological Diversity, which failed in the U.S. Senate in 1994.

=== Energy-flux density ===
LaRouche asserts a concept energy-flux density, which is the rate of energy use per person and per unit area of the economy as a whole. He asserts that an increase in energy flux density as a fundamental principle of the universe in general (contrary the second law of thermodynamics), and the appropriate destiny or goal for mankind in general. Consequently, policies or ideologies deemed to oppose this increase must be opposed and are foolish and dangerous: for example, moves to decrease energy consumption or improve efficiency, or to reduce consumption, or to reduce population; policies deemed increase it should be pursued: higher energy fuels such as nuclear fuels, higher populations, higher consumption.

=== Nuclear power ===
LaRouche says that nuclear and especially fusion power is necessary for the continued growth of civilization. He founded the Fusion Energy Foundation, which published the journal Fusion (later renamed to 21st Century Science & Technology). In his 1980 presidential platform, LaRouche promised 2500 nuclear power plants if elected. In 2007, LaRouche reiterated his position, saying that only the "massive investment" in fission and fusion technology could prevent the "collapse of human existence on this planet".

The movement has targeted opponents of nuclear power. Members of the Clamshell Alliance, non-violent protesters at the Seabrook Nuclear Power Plant in New Hampshire, were called "terrorists" in 1977. Representatives of LaRouche's U.S. Labor Party gave incriminating information to law enforcement about them, which the FBI later determined had been fabricated, according to King. During a large demonstration against the plant in 1989, an airplane carried a banner overhead which read, "Free LaRouche! Kill Satan – Open Seabrook".

The movement blames cabalists, including then-congressman Dick Cheney, for inciting anti-nuclear sentiments during the late 1970s. LaRouche sources described the incident at the nuclear power plant at Three Mile Island as sabotage, since they considered the control systems too sophisticated to fail by accident.

=== DDT ===
21st Century Science & Technology's managing editor, Marjorie Mazel Hecht, called the campaign against DDT the "'mother' of all the environmental hoaxes". Other articles compared anti-DDT campaigner Rachel Carson to Nazi propagandist Joseph Goebbels. 21st century, which is produced by LaRouche supporters, has published papers by entomologist J. Gordon Edwards, including one that urged the return of the insecticide DDT because he said it has "saved more millions of lives than any other man-made chemical". Rogelio (Roger) Maduro, an associate editor, wrote that the ban on DDT was part of a plan to reduce the population and had caused the deaths of 40 million people via a resurgence of malaria.

=== Ozone hole ===
LaRouche was part of what was called the "ozone backlash". 21st Century Science & Technology, which conducted what has been called "a very effective campaign of misinformation on the issue of ozone depletion", published The Holes in the Ozone Scare in 1992. The book, by LaRouche followers Rogelio Maduro and Ralf Schauerhammer, said that chlorofluorocarbons (CFCs) were not destroying the ozone layer and opposed the proposal to ban them. It asserted that most chlorine in the atmosphere came from oceans, volcanoes, or other natural sources, and that CFCs were too heavy to reach the ozone layer. It went on to say that even if the ozone layer were depleted there would not be any harmful effects from additional ultraviolet radiation. It predicted that a ban would result in an additional 20 to 40 million deaths due to food spoilage. Lewis DuPont Smith, an heir to the DuPont Chemical fortune and a LaRouche follower, told Maduro that the DuPont Company had schemed to ban CFCs, which they had invented but which had become generic, in order to replace them with more expensive proprietary compounds. It has been called "probably the best known and most widely quoted text aimed at debunking the concept of ozone depletion". Its assertions were repeated by Dixy Lee Ray in her 1993 book Environmental Overkill, by Rush Limbaugh, and by Ronald Bailey. Some atmospheric scientists have said that it is based on poor research.

At a 1994 shareholder's meeting, Smith called on DuPont to continue producing CFCs, saying there was no evidence of their harmfulness and that "This is nothing less than genocide". By 1995 LaRouche was noted as calling the ozone hole a "myth". Maduro's writings were the basis for the Arizona legislature's passage of a 1995 bill to allow the production of CFCs in the state despite federal and international prohibitions.

=== Global warming ===
The "Greenhouse effect" hoax: a world federalist plot, another book by Maduro, says that the theory of anthropogenic global warming (AGW) is a plot by the British royal family and communists to undermine the U.S. It was cited by science writer David Bellamy.

LaRouche followers have promoted the documentary The Great Global Warming Swindle and attacked Al Gore's An Inconvenient Truth, infiltrating showings to promote their viewpoints. They have stood on street corners proclaiming the falsity of global warming, and have protested Gore's appearances.

21st Century Science & Technology has published papers by climate change contrarians including Zbigniew Jaworowski, Nils-Axel Mörner, Hugh Ellsaesser, and Robert E. Stevenson. A 2007 article by LaRouche science advisor Laurence Hecht suggested that the varying levels of cosmic rays, whose change is dependent on Earth's motion through the galaxy, has a larger effect on the climate than local factors such as greenhouse gases or solar and orbital cycles. Christopher Monckton was praised as the leading spokesman of the "global warming swindle" in the introduction to an Executive Intelligence Review interview with him in 2009, but he was also considered to have a relatively limited view of the cabal behind the hoax. A movement newsletter says that environmental groups seek to "force ... CO2 emissions agreements down the throats of governments as a way of finishing off the nation-state system" on behalf of synarchist networks.

== Music and science ==
LaRouche was fascinated by musical theory, as well as mathematics and physics, and this fascination also translates into his teachings; his followers for example have attempted to link the musical scale to his Neoplatonist model of economic evolution, and study singing and geometry. A common teaser used by the movement is to ask people whether they know how to "double the square"—draw a square whose area is twice the size of an existing square. A motto of LaRouche's European Workers' Party is "Think like Beethoven"; movement offices typically include a piano and posters of German composers, and members are known for their choral singing at protest events, using satirical lyrics tailored to their targets.

LaRouche and his wife had an interest in classical music up to Johannes Brahms. LaRouche abhorred contemporary music; holding that rock music is subversive, and was deliberately created to be so by British intelligence. LaRouche is quoted as saying that jazz music was "foisted on black Americans by the same oligarchy which had run the U.S. slave trade". This dislike for modern music also extends to classical music the movement disapproves of; LaRouche movement members have protested at performances of Richard Wagner's operas, denouncing Wagner as an anti-Semite who found favor with the Nazis, and called a conductor "satanic" because he played contemporary music.

In 1988, LaRouche advocated that classical orchestras should return to the "Verdi pitch", a pitch that Giuseppe Verdi had enshrined in Italian legislation in 1884. Orchestras' pitches have risen since the 18th century, because a higher pitch produces a more brilliant orchestral sound, while imposing an additional strain on singers' voices. Verdi succeeded in 1884 in having legislation passed in Italy that fixed the reference pitch for A at 432 Hz, but in 1938, the international standard was raised to 440 Hz, with some major orchestras tuning as high as 450 Hz in recent times. LaRouche spoke about the resulting strain on singers' voices in his 1988 presidential campaign videos. By 1989 the initiative had attracted support from more than 300 opera stars, including Joan Sutherland, Plácido Domingo, Luciano Pavarotti and Montserrat Caballé. While many of these singers may or may not have been aware of LaRouche's politics, Renata Tebaldi and Piero Cappuccilli ran for the European Parliament on LaRouche's "Patriots for Italy" platform and appeared as featured speakers at a conference organised by the Schiller Institute. (The institute was founded by LaRouche and his wife, Helga.) The discussions led to debates in the Italian parliament about reinstating Verdi's legislation. LaRouche himself gave an interview to National Public Radio on the initiative in 1989 from prison. Stefan Zucker, the editor of Opera Fanatic (and, incidentally, the "world's highest tenor") opposed the initiative on the grounds that it would result in the establishment of a "pitch police", arguing that the way it presented the history of the tuning pitch was a "simplification", and that LaRouche was using the issue to gain credibility. The initiative in the Italian Senate failed to result in corresponding legislation being passed.

LaRouche considered pitch important, believing that the Verdi pitch has a direct relation to the structure of the universe, and that bel canto singing at the correct pitch maximizes the music's impact on both singers and listeners.

== Opposition to Obama's health reforms ==
LaRouche's organization opposed the Obama administration's health-care reform proposals. Due to his belief that the plan was reminiscent of the Nazi T-4 Program, posters of Obama wearing a Hitler-style mustache appeared at a LaRouche movement rally.

As town-hall meetings on this issue during the summer of 2009 began to attract very large and angry crowds, the comparison of Obama to Hitler began to show up on many signs and banners. The Atlantic wrote that LaRouche supporters "patented the Obama-is-Nazi theme".

== Sexuality and politics ==
In 1973, LaRouche wrote an article called "Beyond Psychoanalysis". He theorized that each culture had characteristic flaws that resulted in blocks to effective political organizing. LaRouche and his colleagues conducted studies of different "national ideologies", including German, French, Italian, English, Latin American, Greek, and Swedish.

In an article, "The Sexual Impotency of the Puerto Rican Socialist Party", LaRouche criticised Machismo. Regarding the role of women, he adds, "The task of real women's liberation is to generally strengthen women's self-consciousness and their power and opportunities to act upon self-consciousness."

== Minority politics ==
Critics say the movement is antisemitic, conspiracist, and anti-LGBT, and that its political and economic proposals are a cover for its actual beliefs.

=== Homosexuality ===
During the 1980s, LaRouche and his supporters made comments that were seen as anti-gay. A LaRouche-affiliated newspaper wrote that demonstrators against the LaRouche-sponsored AIDS initiative in California were from the "lower sexual classes."

=== Judaism and Zionism ===
British journalist Roger Boyes wrote, "Anti-Semitism is at the core of LaRouche's conspiracy theories, which he adapts to modern events — most recently the war in Iraq." Daniel Levitas wrote in 1995 that LaRouche "has been consistent in creating and elaborating conspiracy theories that contain a strong dose of antisemitism". As an example of LaRouche's alleged antisemitism, Dennis King cited LaRouche's statement (under the pen name L. Marcus) in The Case of Ludwig Feuerbach (1973), "Jewish culture ... is merely the residue left to the Jewish home after everything saleable has been marketed to the Goyim."

The charge of antisemitism in the LaRouche network resurfaced in the media in 2004 in accounts of the death of a Jewish student, Jeremiah Duggan, who had been attending a Schiller Institute event in Germany. British press reports described LaRouche as "the American leader of a sect with a fascist and antisemitic ideology".

LaRouche denied over a long period that his movement is antisemitic. In 2006, LaRouche said, "Religious and racial hatred, such as anti-Semitism [is] the most evil expression of criminality to be seen on the planet today." Debra Freeman, a spokesperson for LaRouche, told a newspaper in 2010 that, "Hitler was a lunatic, but his policies were based principally on economic policy and staying in power. We mourn the loss of six million Jews and countless others."

LaRouche's critics have said he is a "disguised anti-Semite", in that he takes the classical antisemitic conspiracy theory and substitutes the word "Zionist" for the word "Jew", and ascribes the classical antisemitic caricature of the "scheming Jew" to particular Jewish individuals and groups of Jews, rather than to the Jews as a whole. "Modern Zionism was not created by Jews, but was a project developed chiefly by Oxford University", LaRouche says. He says, "Zionism is not Judaism." In 1978, the same year LaRouche's article cited The Protocols of the Learned Elders of Zion, the LaRouche group published Dope, Inc.: Britain's Opium War against the U.S., which cited the Protocols and defended its authenticity, likening the "Elders of Zion" to the Rothschild banking family, the British Royal family, and the Italian Mafia, and the Israeli Mossad, General Pike, and the B'nai B'rith. Later editions left out cites to The Protocols. This is the genesis of the claim that LaRouche has said Queen Elizabeth runs drugs. When asked by an NBC reporter in 1984 about the Queen and drug running, LaRouche replied, "Of course she's pushing drugs ... that is in a sense of responsibility: the head of a gang that is pushing drugs; she knows it's happening and she isn't stopping it."

Chip Berlet argues that LaRouche indirectly expresses antisemitism through the use of "coded language" and by attacking neoconservatives. Dennis King maintains, for example, that words like "British" were really code words for "Jew". Other critics of LaRouche believe that LaRouche's anti-British statements disparage the British system rather than the Jewish religion. Laird Wilcox and John George write that, "Dennis King goes to considerable lengths to paint LaRouche as a neo-Nazi, even engaging in a little conspiracy-mongering of his own."

=== Race ===
Manning Marable of Columbia University wrote in a 1997 column that LaRouche had a "long attempted to destroy and manipulate black leaders, political organizations and the black church".

During LaRouche's slander suit against NBC in 1984, Roy Innis, leader of the Congress of Racial Equality, took the stand for LaRouche as a character witness, stating under oath that LaRouche's views on racism were "consistent with his own." Asked whether he had seen any indication of racism in LaRouche's associates, he replied that he had not. Innis received criticism from many blacks for having testified on LaRouche's behalf.

The African-American civil-rights leader James Bevel was LaRouche's running mate in the 1992 presidential election, and in the mid-1990s, the LaRouche movement entered into an alliance with Louis Farrakhan's Nation of Islam. Another LaRouche movement member with a record in civil-rights issues is Amelia Boynton Robinson, then the vice-president of the Schiller Institute, a LaRouche organization; she has described the movement as following in the footsteps of Martin Luther King Jr.: "Mr. And [sic] Mrs. LaRouche built a movement, taking up where Dr. King had left off. They realized ... there must be an [sic] universal image of mankind, which transcends all racial differences and barriers."

== Accusations of fascism against the LaRouche movement ==
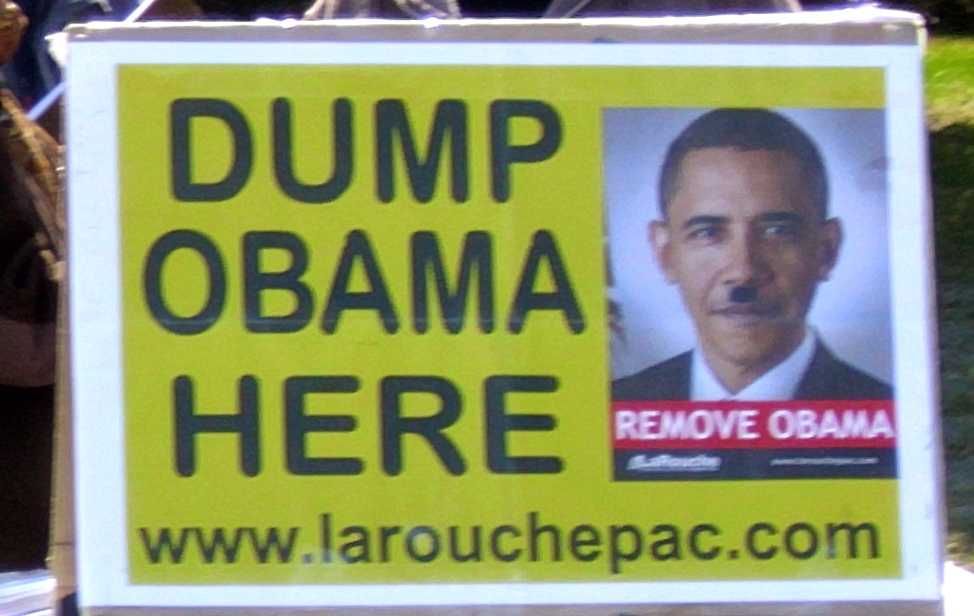
LaRouche supporter sign portraying Barack Obama with a "Hitler mustache"

LaRouche's movement has frequently been accused of being fascist. Those making the accusation include Democratic National Committee chairman Paul G. Kirk, a local Texas Democratic district committee, and Democratic activist Bob Hattoy.

Dennis King, a former Marxist–Leninist and member of the Progressive Labor Party in the 1960s and early 1970s, used this thesis in the title of his book-length study of LaRouche and his movement, Lyndon LaRouche and the New American Fascism (1989). Operation Mop-Up, which is said to have consisted of violent physical attacks on left-wing meetings, is used as a basis for such accusations.

Andrei Fursov, a Russian historian and academician at the International Academy of Sciences in Innsbruck, Austria, was interviewed in 2012 by the Russian think tank and web portal Terra America and asked to comment on the characterizations of LaRouche in Western media. He replied that intellectuals who have called LaRouche a fascist do not deserve to be called intellectuals, and that the charge has no basis in any real scientific analysis of politics. According to Fursov, it comes from the fact that LaRouche criticizes the supposedly "democratic" but actually "liberal totalitarian" system of the West. Fursov said that in Russia not so many people know of LaRouche and that the important thing is not the quantity, but the quality.

George Johnson, in a review of King's book in The New York Times, said that King's presentation of LaRouche as a "would-be Führer" was "too neat", and that it failed to take into account that several members of LaRouche's inner circle were themselves Jewish, while acknowledging that LaRouche's "conspiracy theory is designed to appeal to anti-Semitic right-wingers as well as to Black Muslims and nuclear engineers". In his 1983 book, Architects of Fear, Johnson described LaRouche's dalliances with radical groups on the right as "a marriage of convenience", and less than sincere; as evidence he cited a 1975 party memo that spoke of uniting with the right simply for the purpose of overthrowing the established order: "Once we have won this battle, eliminating our right-wing opposition will be comparatively easy." At the same time, Johnson says, LaRouche also sought contact with the Soviet Union and the Ba'ath Party in Iraq; failing to recruit either the Soviets or right-wingers to his cause, LaRouche attempted to adopt a more mainstream image in the 1980s. Laird Wilcox and John George similarly stated that King had gone too far in trying "to paint LaRouche as a neo-Nazi" and that LaRouche's most severe critics, like King and Berlet, came from extreme leftist backgrounds themselves.

== Sources ==
- Berlet, Chip; Joel Bellman (1989). Lyndon LaRouche: Fascism Wrapped in an American Flag. Political Research Associates.
- Berlet, Chip; Lyons, Matthew N. (2000). "Right-wing populism in America: Too Close for Comfort". New York: Guilford Press. ISBN 978-1-57230-562-5. OCLC 185635579.
- Berlet, Chip (October 30–31, 2005). Protocols to the Left, Protocols to the Right: Conspiracism in American Political Discourse at the Turn of the Second Millennium (dedicated to Jeremiah Duggan). Reconsidering "The Protocols of the Elders of Zion": 100 Years After the Forgery. The Elie Wiesel Center for Judaic Studies, Boston University.
- Copulus, Milton R. (July 19, 1984). "The Larouche Ntwork" (PDF). Archived from the original on January 19, 2006.
- George, John; Wilcox, Laird (1992). Nazis, Communists, Klansmen, and Others on the Fringe: Political Extremism in America. Buffalo: Prometheus Books. ISBN 978-0-87975-680-2.
- George, John; Wilcox, Laird (1996). American Extremists: Militias, Supremacists, Klansmen, Communists & Others (2nd ed.). Amherst: Prometheus Books. ISBN 978-1-57392-058-2.
- Beyes-Corleis, Aglaja (1994). Verirrt. Freiburg: Herder. ISBN 978-3-451-04278-2. OCLC 33502596.
- Johnson, George (1983). "The 'New Dark Ages' Conspiracy". Architects of Fear: Conspiracy Theories and Paranoia in American Politics. J.P Tarcher. ISBN 978-0-87477-275-3.
- Johnson, George (June 18, 1989). "A menace or just a crank?". The New York Times.
- King, Dennis (1989). Lyndon LaRouche and the new American fascism. New York: Doubleday. ISBN 978-0-385-23880-9. OCLC 18684318.
- Kalimtgis, Konstandinos; Goldman, David; Steinberg, Jeffrey (1978). Dope, inc. New York: New Benjamin Franklin House Pub. Co. ISBN 978-0-918388-08-7. OCLC 4492671. On the Protocols, see pp. 31–33; on the Rothschilds, see the chart on pp. 154–55, consult index for more than 20-page entries on the Rothschilds.
- Marable, Manning (1998). Black Leadership. Columbia University Press. ISBN 978-0-231-10746-4.
- Robins, Robert S.; Post, Jerrold M. (1997). Lyndon LaRouche: The Extremity of Reason. Yale University Press.
- Wohlforth, Tim. (n.d.) A '60's Socialist Takes a Hard Right
