= Roy Frankhouser =

American white supremacist (1939–2009)

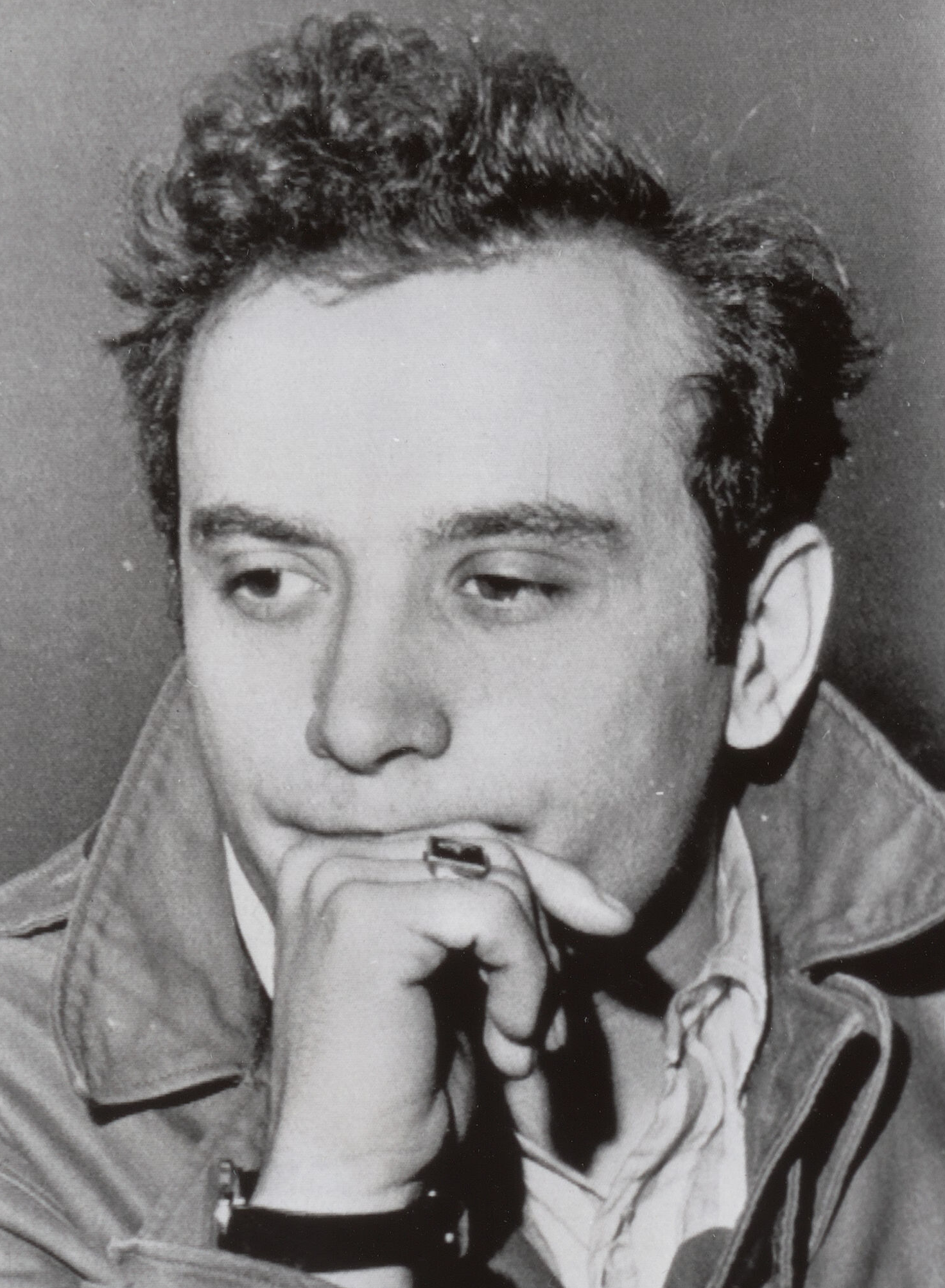
- Frankhouser in 1965
- Born: Roy Everett Frankhouser Jr. November 4, 1939; Reading, Pennsylvania, U.S.
- Died: May 15, 2009 (aged 69); West Reading, Pennsylvania, U.S.
- Occupations: Activist; government informant; security consultant
- Organization(s): American Nazi Party, Ku Klux Klan

Roy Everett Frankhouser Jr. (also spelled Frankhauser; November 4, 1939 – May 15, 2009) was an American far-right activist, government informant, and security consultant to Lyndon LaRouche. He was a member or associate of a variety of far-right and neo-Nazi groups over several decades, including the American Nazi Party, and was a Grand Dragon of the Ku Klux Klan. Frankhouser was reported by federal officials to have been arrested at least 142 times, and was convicted of federal crimes in at least three cases, including dealing in stolen explosives and obstruction of justice.

Author Frederick J. Simonelli noted that at "one time or another he was a member of just about every radical right-wing group in the United States". In the 1992 book Nazis, Communists, Klansmen, and Others on the Fringe, authors John George and Laird Wilcox described Frankhouser as simply "a nightmare". In 2003 he told a reporter, "I'm accused of everything from the sinking of the Titanic to landing on the moon."

== Early life ==
Roy Everett Frankhouser Jr. was born in Reading, Pennsylvania on November 4, 1939. His parents divorced when he was young, resulting in him becoming the subject of a prolonged custody battle. His mother was an alcoholic. He attended Northwest Junior High School through the tenth grade, and became active in racist causes. As a teenager, he was a Ku Klux Klan and neo-Nazi sympathizer, and collected Nazi paraphernalia and uniforms. He joined the KKK at the age of 14. His school officials as well as his employers described him as "emotionally unstable and unreliable".

In October 1956, he joined the United States Army and served one year as a paratrooper. While in the military he was involved in what authors John George and Laird Wilcox called "a number of half-baked plots"; he had specifically volunteered for airborne duty, so he could be transferred to Germany. He then plotted to manage to have himself declared dead, where he could then become a prominent neo-Nazi. He later plotted to desert the army and join Cuban revolutionary forces; in pursuit of this, he went AWOL and fled to Miami in July 1957. He was then arrested and returned. He was discharged after being deemed unfit for service.

== Political activity ==
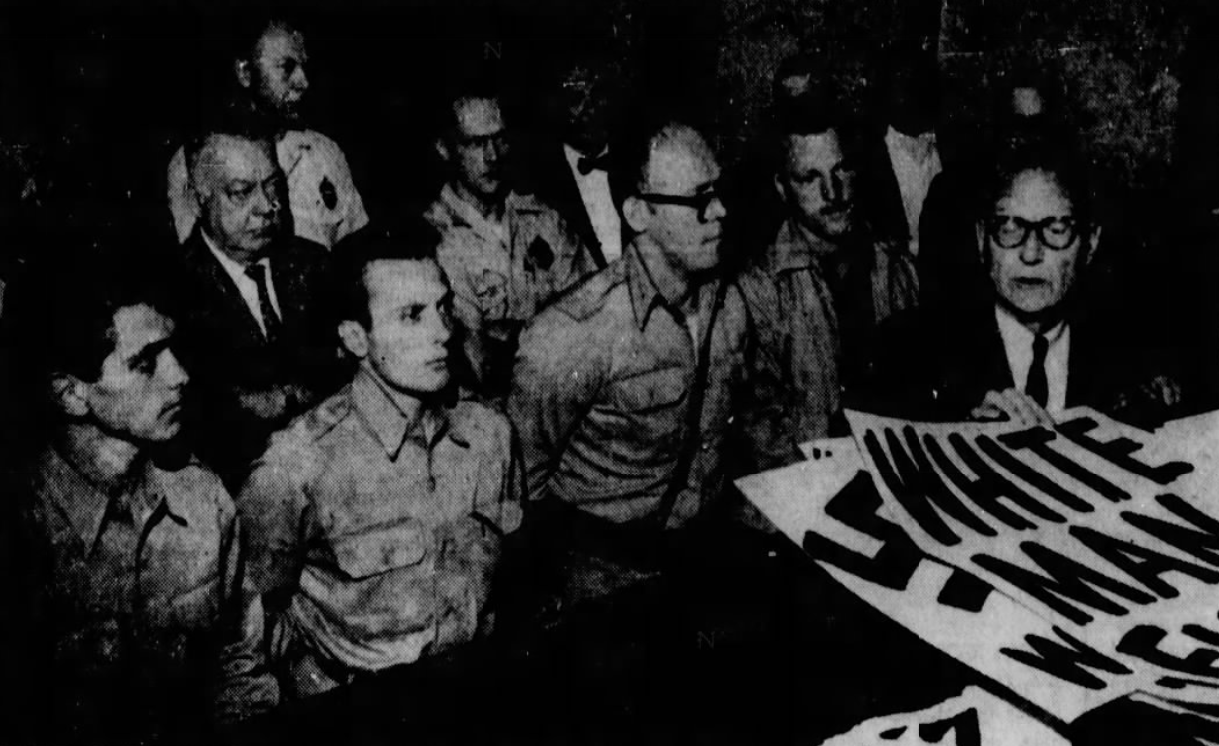
Frankhouser (second from left) with other ANP members at a trial for hate literature in August 1963

Frankhouser was a member of a variety of different far-right groups over many decades and associated with many more. Author Frederick J. Simonelli noted that "one time or another he was a member of just about every radical right-wing group in the United States". Irwin Suall, of the Anti-Defamation League (ADL), called Frankhouser "a thread that runs through the history of American hate groups." In the 1992 book Nazis, Communists, Klansmen, and Others on the Fringe, authors John George and Laird Wilcox described Frankhouser as simply "a nightmare". In 2003 he told a reporter, "I'm accused of everything from the sinking of the Titanic to landing on the moon."

When he was 19 he met George Lincoln Rockwell, founder of the American Nazi Party. He was later described as a protégé of Rockwell's. His first recorded arrest occurred at age 22, when he kicked a policeman in the shins during a 1961 protest in Atlanta. He participated in Nazi party rallies and Klan demonstrations, being arrested often for disorderly conduct. Fellow Klansmen nicknamed him "Riot Roy". At about the same time he was a member of the National States' Rights Party, and was later active in the Minutemen. Frankhouser became the Grand Dragon of Pennsylvania in 1965. The following year he appeared before the House Un-American Activities Committee as part of its investigation of the Ku Klux Klan.

Frankhouser lost an eye in 1965, and afterwards had a glass eye. There are a variety of stories of what led to this. He likely lost it during a fight with black people in a Reading bar. According to Frankhouser, he lost his eye in an attack by pipe-wielding Jews. A third story is that he lost it during the Bay of Pigs Invasion. At a fundraising auction for the Klan, one of his glass eyes sold for $5. He also had a scar on his head which he said was from a brick thrown by a counter-demonstrator.

Frankhouser was an associate of neo-Nazi Dan Burros, who he had known as a member of the American Nazi Party and with whom he reconnected with once they had both left. He recruited Burros into the Ku Klux Klan in 1965. Burros and Frankhouser became close friends; when, in October 1965, the House Un-American Activities Committee announced they were launching an investigation into the Klan, several Klansmen, including Burros, hid out at Frankhouser's home. A few weeks later, Burros fatally shot himself in Frankhouser's home when it was publicized by The New York Times that he had hidden the fact that he was actually Jewish. After his death, Frankhouser refused to disavow Burros, and apologized to Burros's parents. During the HUAC hearings the next year, he pleaded the Fifth 33 times rather than answer their questions. Many of the questions were about Burros and his involvement. Frankhouser was one of the only people in the hearings who was not afterwards imprisoned for contempt of congress. He then became an FBI informant.

In 1972, he marched down Fifth Avenue in Manhattan wearing a black stormtrooper's uniform to defy a city ban on wearing Nazi outfits in public. That same year, Frankhouser approached the FBI about working as an informant, offering information on groups such as black militants, the Jewish Defense League, the Irish Republican Army and Black September. The National Security Council approved a mission in which he was sent to Canada to infiltrate Black September, but he was unsuccessful. Frankhouser was also an organizer of the Minutemen and a member of the National States' Rights Party, the National Renaissance Party, the Liberty Lobby, and the White Citizens Council.

Frankhouser was reported by federal officials to have been arrested at least 142 times. He was convicted of federal crimes in at least three cases, including dealing in stolen explosives and obstruction of justice. Frankhouser was convicted of conspiring to sell 240 pounds (110 kg) of stolen dynamite in 1975. The charges included selling explosives which were used in the bombing of a school bus in Pontiac, Michigan that killed one man. During the trial he revealed he was a government informant, saying that he was acting on behalf of the U.S. Bureau of Alcohol, Tobacco and Firearms (ATF). The government denied his assertion. Though he faced up to fifty-one years in prison, he was sentenced to two concurrent five-year probation terms as part of a plea agreement. Lyndon LaRouche initiated a legal defense on behalf of Frankhouser. After his conviction, he was expelled from the Klan.

=== LaRouche movement ===
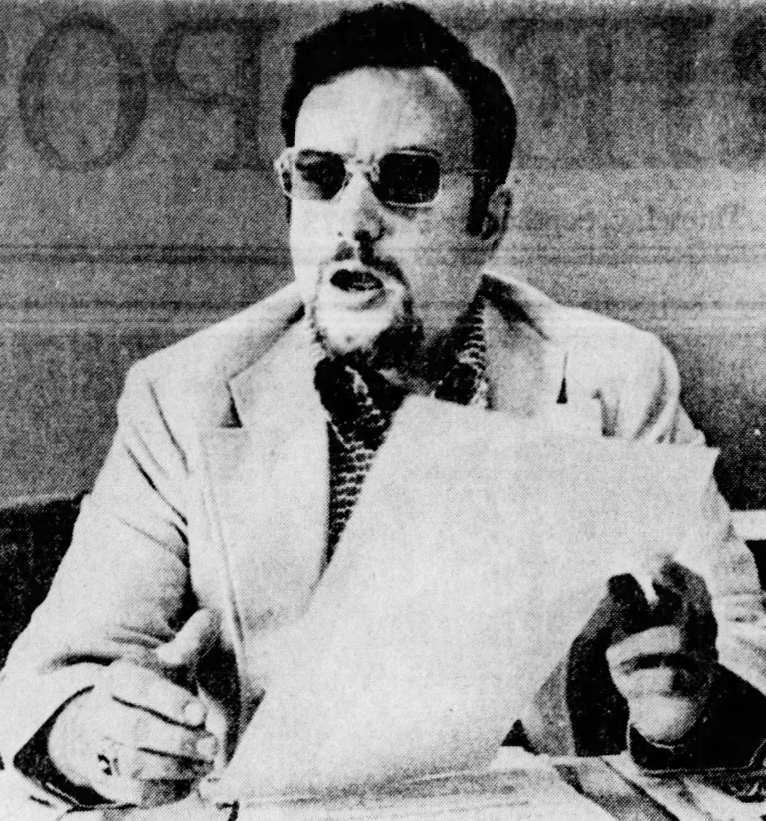
Frankhouser at a 1975 news conference

Frankhouser became a security consultant for political activist Lyndon LaRouche in 1979 after Frankhouser convinced LaRouche that Frankhouser was actively connected to U.S. intelligence agencies. In a 1984 deposition, LaRouche described Frankhouser as "an expert in security matters" who can "detect nasties by their wiggle". In U.S. v. Frankhauser, Frankhouser testified that he and LaRouche security employee Forrest Lee Fick had invented a connection to the CIA in order to justify his $700 a week salary as a security consultant. He said that he had persuaded a friend to play a former top CIA official (named "Ed" by Frankhouser, after "Mister Ed") in meetings with LaRouche. When LaRouche found out about a grand jury investigation, he reportedly told Frankhouser to get the CIA to quash it. Frankhouser told LaRouche that the CIA wanted him to destroy evidence and hide witnesses.

Frankhouser claimed that on another occasion LaRouche sent him to Boston to check on the grand jury investigation. Instead of going to Boston he went to a Star Trek convention in Scranton, Pennsylvania and called to warn LaRouche that the FBI had wiretapped his phones. During the grand jury investigation, documents were presented which showed Frankhouser had advised members of the organization that unless they handled matters correctly they could "start writing a concerto for canaries in B major." He suggested destroying records, writing in a letter to LaRouche that "paper burns at 451 degrees Fahrenheit, a scientific fact." As soon as he was arrested, he began cooperating with federal prosecutors. He testified that members of LaRouche's organization had asked him to assassinate former U.S. Secretary of State Henry Kissinger, an enemy of the LaRouche movement. He also said that he had been ordered by Jeffrey Steinberg, LaRouche's head of counterintelligence, to organize pickets to disrupt the grand jury proceedings. When the LaRouche movement learned that Frankhouser was an informant, it saw that as evidence of the "FBI-CIA-Rockefeller-Buckley" control of the extreme Right, and an example of how government connections could immunize criminal behavior.

LaRouche was called as a defense witness in Frankhouser's trial but he refused to testify, exercising his Fifth Amendment right to avoid self-incrimination. Frankhouser was found guilty on December 10, 1987, of obstruction of the federal investigation into credit card fraud. He was sentenced by US District Judge Robert E. Keeton to three years and a $50,000 fine. After his conviction, he was granted immunity against further prosecution and compelled to testify against LaRouche.

== Later years ==
Starting in the 1980s he appeared regularly on Berks County public-access television with the white supremacist shows Race and Reason and "White Forum".

He was arrested April 28, 1993, for stabbing a KKK guard at a Klan convention. He testified that he was ambushed by the guard and several skinheads, and that he defended himself with his Swiss Army knife. He was acquitted of the crime due to self-defense.

In 1995 he was convicted in a federal court in Boston of advising the mother of Brian Clayton, the white supremacist head of the "New Dawn Hammerskins" gang, to destroy evidence linking her son to the desecration of synagogues and to attacks on black residents. Frankhouser had been harboring Clayton, who was sought by the FBI, for nine months. At the time, Frankhouser was described by the U.S. Attorney as the leader of the Pale Riders faction of the KKK. US District Court Judge Patti B. Saris sentenced him to 25 months in prison. On appeal, one count of obstruction of justice was overturned while another was affirmed.

Frankhouser became the pastor of the Mountain Church of Jesus Christ, an arm of Robert E. Miles' movement. Frankhouser held services in his home, and sought a property tax exemption for the row house. The house reportedly had a small worship room with a makeshift altar, Klan flags, and pictures of Adolf Hitler and cross burnings. In 1998, Berks County tax officials refused to recognize it as a legitimate church on the grounds that Frankhouser could not provide adequate proof that he was an ordained minister.

According to a 1997 complaint, Frankhouser, then Grand Dragon of the United Klans of America in Pennsylvania, had been harassing Bonnie Jouhari and her daughter. Jouhari was a white woman who worked at the Reading-Berks Human Relations Council, helping out people who had been discriminated against. After many unsuccessful attempts by Jouhari to get government agencies to act, she convinced the Southern Poverty Law Center (SPLC) to take her case. Frankhouser eventually settled the case with terms set by the judge. Frankhouser had to complete 1,000 hours of community service, make public apologies to Jouhari and her daughter on his "White Forum" TV show and local newspapers, pay them 10% of his income for a decade, and undergo "sensitivity training". The settlement was supported by HUD Secretary Andrew Cuomo and Reverend Jesse Jackson at a press conference also attended by NAACP president Kweisi Mfume.

Frankhouser fought with Lancaster, Pennsylvania, officials in 2001 over their restrictions on demonstrations by the KKK. He called himself a spokesman for the American Knights of the Ku Klux Klan; however, doubts were expressed in both the KKK and anti-hate communities over whether Frankhouser had any actual connection to the group.

== Death ==
Frankhouser died of natural causes on May 15, 2009, at the Spruce Manor Nursing Home in West Reading, Pennsylvania, where he had resided since 2006.
