= Stephen E. Atkins =

American academic librarian (1941–2010)

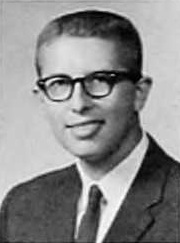
- Atkins' 1963 yearbook photo at the University of Missouri
- Born: Stephen Eugene Atkins; January 29, 1941; Columbia, Missouri, U.S.
- Died: March 26, 2010 (aged 69); College Station, Texas, U.S.
- Education: University of Missouri (BA, MA); University of Iowa (PhD); University of Illinois Urbana-Champaign (MS)
- Spouse: Susan Jordan (m. 1966)
- Children: 2
- Writing career
- Subjects: Terrorism, extremism

Stephen Eugene Atkins (January 29, 1941 – March 26, 2010) was an American academic librarian and historian. After his graduation from the University of Illinois Urbana-Champaign, he was a political science subject specialist and was later the head of collection development at Sterling C. Evans Library at Texas A&M University until 1997, successively their associate university librarian for collection management and associate dean for collection management. Atkins wrote 10 books, mostly reference works on topics related to extremism and terrorism.

== Early life and education ==
Stephen Eugene Atkins was born in Columbia, Missouri, on January 29, 1941. His mother, Arletta Bragg, was an office worker, while his father Frank Atkins was a superintendent. In Atkins's youth he attended 13 different schools in 12 years in the states of Texas and South Carolina due to his family regularly traveling. He graduated from a high school in Mexico, Missouri.

He attended the University of Missouri, where he received a Bachelor of Arts degree with honors in European history in 1963. He received his Master of Arts degree with honors in French history from the same school the next year. He began working to receive a PhD in French history from the University of Iowa, though this was interrupted by his service in the Vietnam War as a soldier in the United States Army for two years. He resumed his studies after his two years of service and received his PhD in 1976. At the University of Illinois Urbana-Champaign, he received an MS in library and information science in 1983.

== Career ==
Unable to find a teaching job, he instead shifted to being a librarian and was a copy cataloger at the University of Iowa for a decade, from 1973 to 1983. After his graduation from the University of Illinois Urbana-Champaign, he was a political science subject specialist there for a decade, until 1989. Atkins moved on to the head of collection development at the Sterling C. Evans Library at Texas A&M University until 1997. From 1997 to 2003 he was their associate university librarian for collection management. From 2003 on, he was the associate dean for collection management at Texas A&M.

He stepped down later due to sickness and became curator of the Cushing Library's Dawson Collection and French studies collections. From 1989 to 1984, Atkins was on the board of directors of ACCESS: A Security Information Service. In addition to his work as a librarian and author, he taught courses in terrorism and extremism, his main scholarly topic, and French history.

== Works ==
Atkins authored 10 books, mostly reference works. His first book, Arms Control and Disarmament, Defense and Military, International Security, and Peace: An Annotated Guide to Sources, 1980-1987, a bibliography, was published in 1989 by ABC-CLIO. His next book, The Academic Library in the American University, focuses on academic libraries. In 2000 he wrote the Historical Encyclopedia of Atomic Energy, which received the 2000 Booklist Editor's Choice Award.

He authored several reference books on political extremism and terrorism. In 1992, his Terrorism: A Reference Handbook was published by ABC-CLIO. Others works he wrote on the same topic include Encyclopedia of Modern American Extremists and Extremist Groups in 2002 and, in 2004, Encyclopedia of Modern Worldwide Extremists and Extremist Groups.

Atkins's book The 9/11 Encyclopedia was published by Praeger Security International in 2008. It received two updated editions posthumously: a second edition in 2011 revised with new entries by Spencer C. Tucker, and a third edition containing further updates in 2021, instead titled 9/11: The Essential Reference Guide. In 2009, his book on Holocaust denial, Holocaust Denial as an International Movement, was published by Praeger.

His memoir on his Vietnam experiences, Writing the War, was his last book published in his lifetime, a few weeks before his death. Posthumously, the Encyclopedia of Right-Wing Extremism in Modern American History was published by ABC-CLIO in 2011. It was completed by his wife and his children. Unlike his prior reference works on the topic, this entry is not organized like an encyclopedia but rather in sections and chapters. It focuses on the post-1930s far-right, with the exception of the Ku Klux Klan, which is older.

== Personal life and death ==
He married Susan Starr Jordan in 1966. They had two children. Atkins died on 26 March 2010 in College Station, Texas, of colon cancer. Posthumously, he was the recipient of the annual 2011 Marta Lange/CQ Press Award by the American Library Association. The award was presented to his widow.

== Bibliography ==
- —— (1989). Arms Control and Disarmament, Defense and Military, International Security, and Peace: An Annotated Guide to Sources 1980-1987. Santa Barbara: ABC-CLIO. ISBN 0-87436-488-4.
- —— (1991). The Academic Library in the American University. Chicago: American Library Association. ISBN 0-8389-0567-6.
- —— (1992). Terrorism: A Reference Handbook. Santa Barbara: ABC-CLIO. ISBN 0-87436-670-4.
- —— (2000). Historical Encyclopedia of Atomic Energy. Westport: Greenwood Press. ISBN 0-313-30400-9.
- —— (2002). Encyclopedia of Modern American Extremists and Extremist Groups. Westport: Greenwood Press. ISBN 0-313-31502-7.
- —— (2004). Encyclopedia of Modern Worldwide Extremists and Extremist Groups. Westport: Greenwood Press. ISBN 0-313-32485-9.
- ——, ed. (2008). The 9/11 Encyclopedia. Westport: Praeger Security International. ISBN 978-0-275-99432-7.
  - ——, ed. (2011). The 9/11 Encyclopedia (2nd ed.). Santa Barbara: ABC-CLIO. ISBN 978-1-59884-922-6.
  - ——, ed. (2021). 9/11: The Essential Reference Guide (3rd ed.). Santa Barbara: ABC-CLIO. ISBN 978-1-4408-7303-4.
- —— (2009). Holocaust Denial as an International Movement. Westport: Praeger Publishing. ISBN 978-0-313-34538-8.
- —— (2009). Writing the War: My Ten Months in the Jungles, Streets and Paddies of South Vietnam, 1968. Jefferson: McFarland & Company. ISBN 978-0-7864-4272-0.
- —— (2011). Encyclopedia of Right-Wing Extremism in Modern American History. Santa Barbara: ABC-CLIO. ISBN 978-1-59884-350-7.
