= Encyclopedia of Modern American Extremists and Extremist Groups =

2002 book by Stephen E. Atkins

- Cover of the first edition
- Author: Stephen E. Atkins
- Language: English
- Subject: Extremism
- Publisher: Greenwood Press
- Publication date: 2002
- Publication place: United States
- Media type: Print
- Pages: 375
- ISBN: 0-313-31502-7
- OCLC: 48588289
- Dewey Decimal: 320.53
- LC Class: HN90.R3 A75 2002

Encyclopedia of Modern American Extremists and Extremist Groups is a reference work on extremism written by Stephen E. Atkins. It was published by Greenwood Press in 2002. Atkins was then an academic librarian and the associate university librarian of Texas A&M University. It covers American domestic extremists from 1950 to 2001, though most of the book's contents are focused on the post-1980 era. Atkins defines extremism as those who deviate substantially from "normal economic, political, religious, or social standards" in their activism.

The encyclopedia contains 275 entries on extremist people, extremist groups, and broad topics related to extremism. Those profiled are from a variety of political ideologies, including left- and right-wing extremists, but also more specific causes like environmentalism. Foreign terrorism targeting the United States, such as the September 11 attacks, is excluded. The book received positive reviews, with praise for its writing and the information provided. Several reviewers also complimented its scope as unique in its focus on extremism broadly rather than a specific variety and as filling a gap in the literature.

== Background and publication history ==
At the time of the book's publication, author Stephen E. Atkins was an academic librarian and the associate university librarian of Texas A&M University. The Encyclopedia of Modern American Extremists and Extremist Groups was first published in 2002 by Greenwood Press in Westport, Connecticut. Its first edition was 375 pages long. For sources, Atkins mostly used publicly accessible materials such as newspaper and magazine reports, autobiographical and biographical materials on those profiled, and information from the watchdog groups the Anti-Defamation League and Southern Poverty Law Center.

Two years after the book's publication, Atkins wrote another encyclopedia with a similar scope, the Encyclopedia of Modern Worldwide Extremists and Extremist Groups, focusing on non-American extremists, which reviewers described as a companion volume or a complement to the original book. Following Atkins' death, in 2011 his Encyclopedia of Right-Wing Extremism in Modern American History was posthumously published. That book covers similar topics as the Encyclopedia of Modern American Extremists but is more narrowly focused on right-wing extremism.

== Contents ==
In defining extremism, Atkins defines it as those people or groups who deviate significantly from "normal economic, political, religious, or social standards" and with behaviors far outside the norm, often, but not exclusively, violently, in an effort to change the status quo. He limits the book's scope to domestic extremists with origins in the United States, so foreign extremists who attacked the United States are excluded, e.g., the September 11 attackers, though those with foreign influences are included. He additionally excludes criminals who perpetrated their crimes for personal gain. Left, right, and religious extremists are included, as are extremists on more specific issues, e.g., environmentalists, animal rights activists, cult leaders like Marshall Applewhite, or ACT UP and their militant AIDS awareness. Some entries are on broad topics, like the anti-abortion movement or the whole animal rights movement.

The encyclopedia contains 275 entries, listed alphabetically. The entries are divided into three categories of extremist: religious, political, and social/economic. The largest category are the political extremists, followed by the religious, with the smallest being the social/economic extremists. Entries vary from 200 to 1500 words each and include cross-referencing and a suggested reading section for each entry. Both biographical and organizational entries are included. It includes photographs of some subjects. The book's contents only cover since 1950, with the exception of the Ku Klux Klan, which has an older founding date of 1866. Most of the book's contents are post-1980. The latest entry focuses on late 2001. It concludes with an events chronology, which is 13 pages long. It has a selected bibliography and an index.

== Reception ==
The Encyclopedia of Modern American Extremists and Extremist Groups received positive reviews, and it was recommended by several reviewers. Several sources praised the writing and the amount of information provided. Reviewer Mark Y. Herring said it "stands as a sad testament to this country’s homegrown hotheads, lunatics, and guttersnipes."

W. Jakub for Choice said Atkins had made "a marvelous attempt to ferret out from the nether regions of society" the extremists profiled, while Herring called it "excellent" as a reference work. Karen Evans for Choice called it "outstanding" with "fundamental information on extremists and their activities" noting its examination of the FBI's involvement in multiple extremist cases. School Library Journal's Elizabeth M. Reardon called it an "exhaustive" resource and praised its usage of cross referencing, while Michael Sawyer for Library Journal praised its inclusion of more obscure extremists. David A. Lincove for Reference and User Services Quarterly complimented the encyclopedia's writing and its theme, calling it well-defined; he called it a "comprehensive [...] guide to the most influential and significant extremist people, groups, and movements" though said given its reliance on popular materials for its information, those seeking scholarly studies may want to look elsewhere for an explanation of extremism. He noted the inclusion of some entries like Greenpeace or ACT UP as seeming to lie more with their methods than their ideology.

Several reviewers noted its scope as unique: that of political extremism broadly, rather than a specific variety of extremism. Several reviewers praised it for covering an area that lacked many reference works. Lincove compared it to the 1992 book Nazis, Communists, Klansmen, and Others on the Fringe, calling that the only similar reference work in terms of scope and topic matter (being on a broad range of extremists rather than left or right specifically, like the Encyclopedia of White Power), though he said this encyclopedia was more comprehensive. Another reviewer compared it to America in the Sixties: Right, Left, and Center by Peter B. Levy in its inclusion of a variety of political ideologies.
