= Edward Cushing =

Edward Cushing may refer to:

- Edward Benjamin Cushing (1862–1924), American engineer and academic administrator
- Edward Hopkins Cushing (1829–1879), newspaper editor in Houston
