= Stephen Sloan =

American political scientist (born 1936)

Stephen Sloan (born June 24, 1936) is an American political scientist known for studying terrorism and political violence.

== Biography ==
Sloan received his B.A. from Washington Square College at New York University, and his M.A. and Ph.D. in comparative politics from New York University. He was formerly the Lawrence J. Chastang Distinguished Professor of Terrorism Studies at the University of Central Florida, where he remains a Distinguished Fellow of the Global Perspectives Office. Previously, he was a Professor and Presidential Professor at the University of Oklahoma for almost 40 years. At the University of Oklahoma, he taught the first university class on terrorism in the United States, and became the Samuel Roberts Noble Foundation Presidential Professor of Political Science before leaving the university's faculty in 2004. In 1999, he was a member of the steering committee that formed the Memorial Institute for the Prevention of Terrorism. He is the author or co-author of 13 books including A Study in Political Violence: The Indonesian Experience, Simulating Terrorism, Red Teams and Counterterrorism Training with Robert J. Bunker and The Historical Dictionary of Terrorism of Terrorism with Sean K. Anderson. Dr. Sloan pioneered and conducted numerous simulations internationally for military and police forces as well as corporate security entities. He has also consulted on terrorism to the United States military and several United States government agencies.
