= Texas A&M University Libraries =

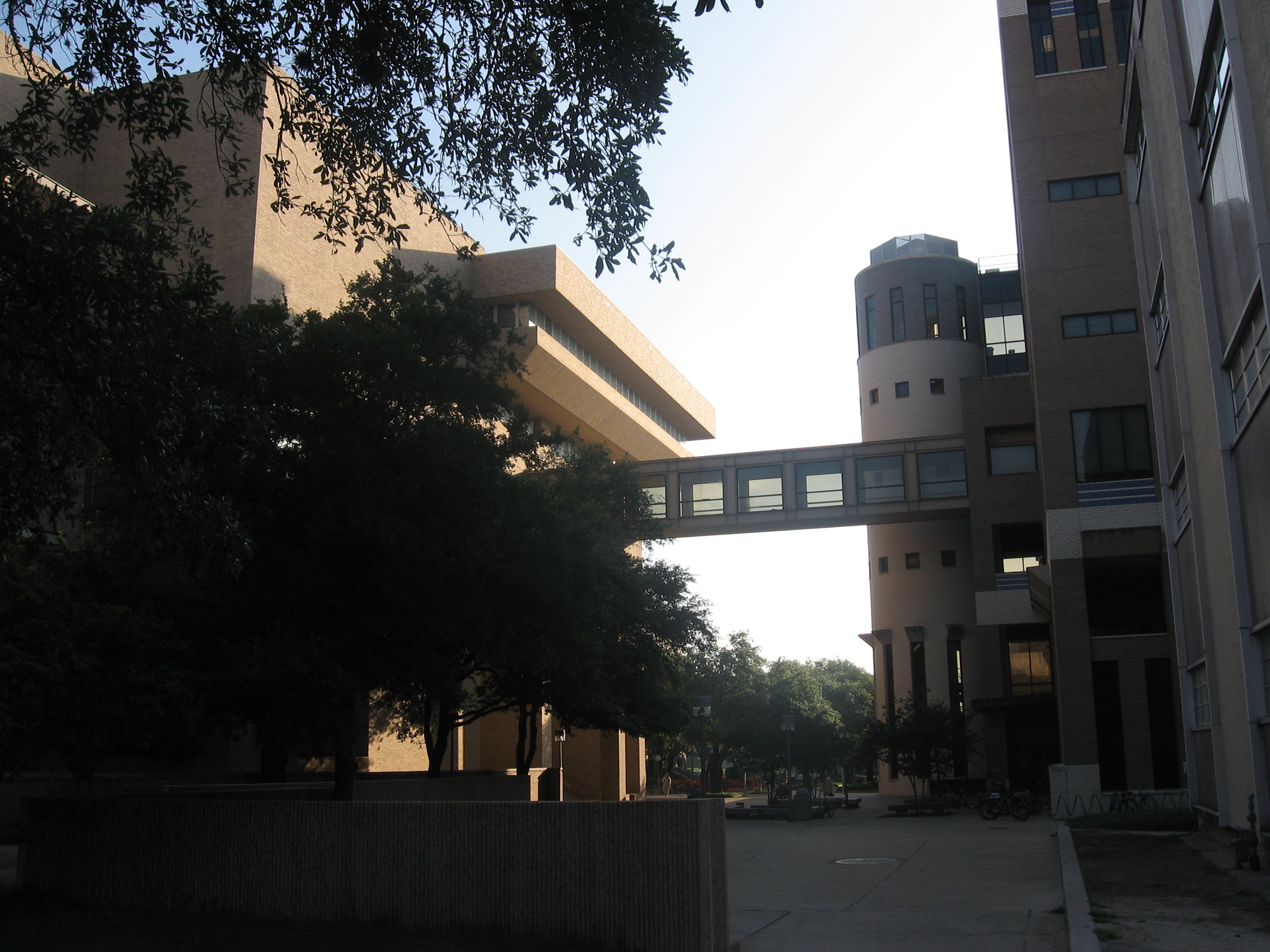
- Evans Library and Library Annex
- Location: College Station, Texas, United States
- Type: Academic library
- Established: 1930

Collection
- Items collected: books, journals, newspapers, magazines, sound and music recordings, maps, manuscripts, photographs, art collections, and films
- Size: ca. 5 million items

Access and use
- Population served: Texas A&M University Students, Faculty, and Staff, and outlying area
- Members: Texas A&M University Students, Faculty, and Staff, and courtesy users from outlying area

Other information
- Budget: $38 million
- Director: Julie Mosbo Ballestro
- Website: library.tamu.edu

The Texas A&M University Libraries are a part of Texas A&M University.

== Contents and Services ==
=== Contents ===
The libraries house over 4.5 million print volumes, including nearly 124,000 serial titles, and over 5.5 million microform items. Holdings also include approximately 250,000 maps in the Maps & GIS Library, and over 21,000 feet (6,400 m) of archival and manuscript collections in the Cushing Memorial Library and Archives, including approximately 170,000 printed volumes, over 50,000 photographs, over 200 original works of art, hundreds of individual artifacts, and other works on film, tape, CD, and other media. The Media & Reserves desk houses popular and academic films on DVD and Blu-ray, popular and academic music on CDs, and textbooks for many classes on Course Reserve. Patrons can suggest a purchase for new library acquisitions (popular or academic). The library also provides extensive online resources, including more than 12,500 electronic journals and newspapers, over 700 databases, and over 1 million eBooks. Most databases and electronic books are available remotely to students in their dorms, faculty in their offices, or affiliated patrons conducting remote work. Most collections are included in LibCat, the Libraries' catalog, or the Texas A&M Medical Sciences Library catalog.

=== Services ===
The library provides a number of services to support the teaching and research needs of Texas A&M students and faculty. The Evans Library Annex and the West Campus Library are open 24/5 to meet the needs of students who increasingly stay late to do research and reading for their classes, as well as work on projects.

==== Get It For Me/Document Delivery ====
Get It For Me! offers a campus-wide document delivery service which allows patrons to request items from either the Texas A&M Libraries or a lending library. The service will provide electronic copies of articles, journals, or book chapters (up to 50 pages) for students, staff, and faculty. Get It For Me! can also be used to request that staff retrieve a book owned by the Texas A&M Libraries and place for patron pick-up at any of the libraries in the system.

==== Search Tools and Popular Databases ====
Time-saving search tools are available through SearchNow linking to the most appropriate full text of many books and journals available online. The Libraries also have a list of popular databases available to students, staff, and faculty for on- or off- campus use.

==== Subject Librarians ====
The libraries have a subject librarian for each academic subject offered on campus to aid in beginning the research process specific to classes and reference in the respective field. Evans Library has a consultation area for an on-duty librarian to help incoming patrons begin the research process.

==== Social Outreach and Other Services ====
In recent years, the libraries have begun to reach out to patrons through social media. Patrons are provided with a variety of ways for contacting the libraries, including messaging an on-duty librarian via text, chat, email, phone, and office hours.

== Libraries ==
Among the Texas A&M Libraries are:

=== Sterling C. Evans Library and Library Annex ===
The general academic library containing the bulk of the library collections and services, including access services, interlibrary loan, consolidated reference, current periodicals and serials, course reserves, United States and Texas government documents, audiovisual and media services, reading and study rooms, and the Administrative Offices. The Maps & GIS Library resides on the second floor of the Evans Library, as does the University Writing Center. The Office of Graduate Studies houses the Thesis Office in room 612 on the sixth floor of Evans Library. Both Evans Library and the Library Annex provide public study areas, as well as group and individual study rooms for students, staff, and faculty. The Library Annex is open 24/5 to meet the needs of undergraduate and graduate students.

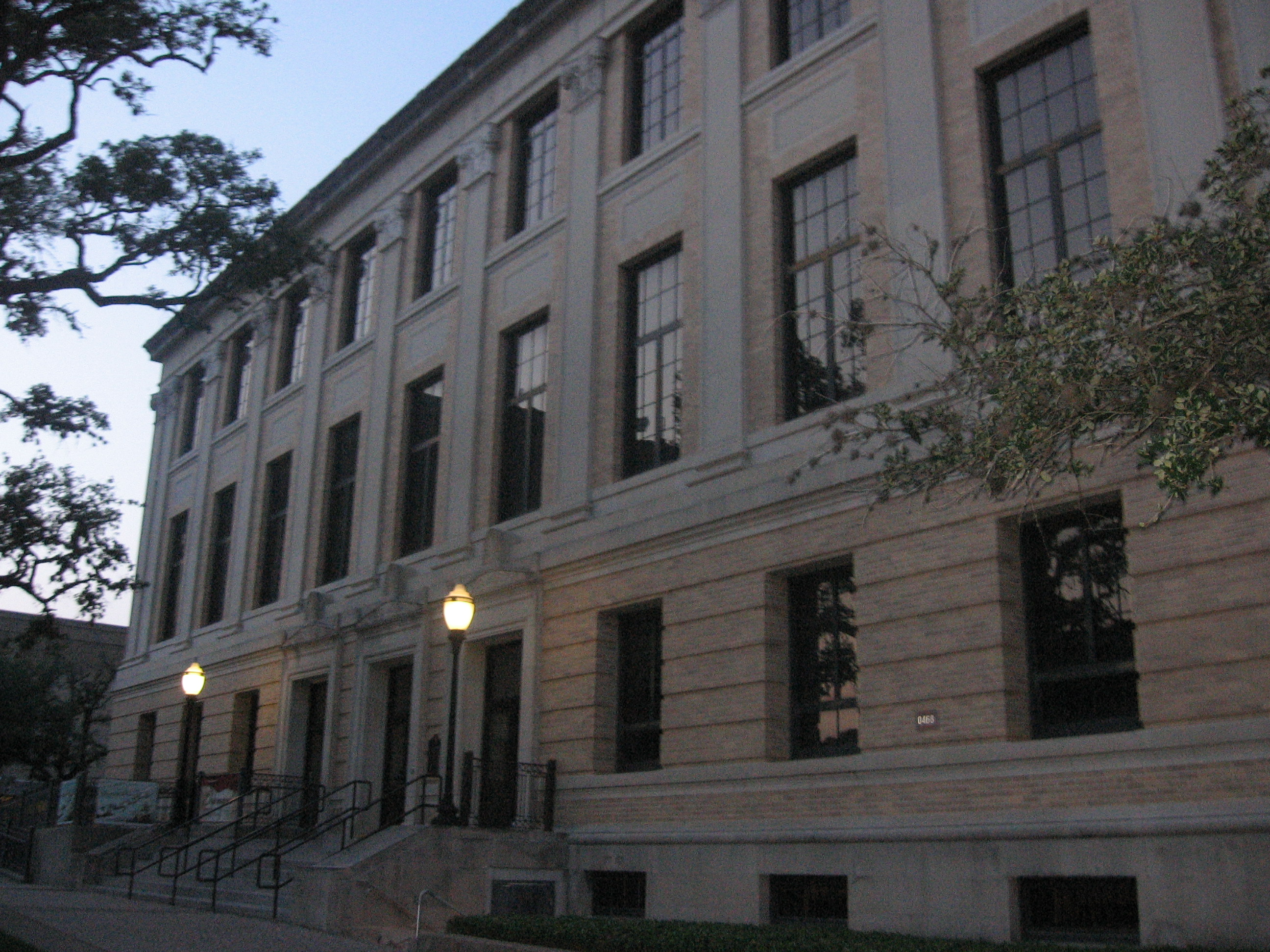
Cushing Library

=== Cushing Memorial Library and Archives ===
Constructed in 1930 and named after Edward Benjamin Cushing, it was the first freestanding library facility on campus and is now home to special collections, rare books, and the University Archives. The collections span recorded history, from Sumerian clay tablets dating from 2400 BCE to contemporary science fiction paperbacks. These collections comprise over 21,000 feet (6,400 m) of manuscript and archival material, approximately 170,000 printed volumes, over 50,000 photographs, over 200 original works of art, hundreds of individual artifacts, and other works on film, tape, CD, and other media.

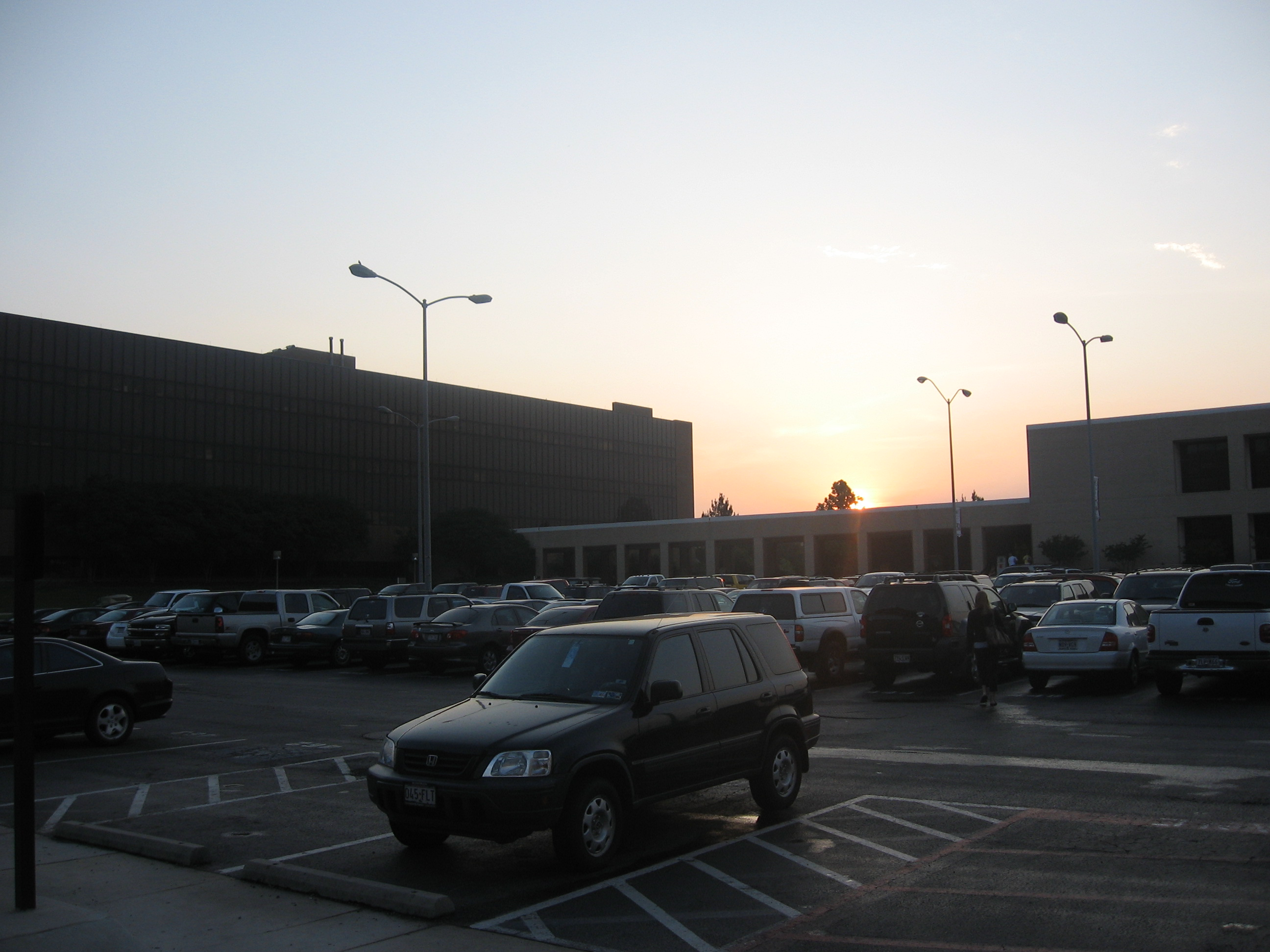
Medical Sciences Library

=== Maps & GIS Library ===
The Map & GIS Library is located in Room 202B of the Sterling C. Evans Library. The collection consists of over 250,000 individual sheet maps, 3,000 atlases and gazetteers, and 1000 CD/DVDs, including worldwide coverage of topographic and geological maps, and GIS datasets. The Maps & GIS Library also houses the "Maps of Imaginary Places Collection," a collection of maps of fictional lands from literature, games, television, film, radio shows, and other media. The Library offers GIS assistance for those seeking data and support. They also provide assistance to all colleges and agencies associated with Texas A&M, as well as members of the local community.

=== Policy Sciences and Economics Library ===
Located at the Annenberg Presidential Conference Center, the Policy Sciences & Economics Library provides library resources and services.

=== Qatar Library ===
Texas A&M University has initiated a program of study in the emerging nation of Qatar. A focused and growing library supports the four engineering disciplines: chemical, electrical, mechanical, and petroleum and the liberal arts subject areas required for these degrees. In addition to managing information resources, the library provides service and support to a multinational student body and faculty researchers as well as the local community of oil/gas industry specialists. Built on the vast collection of the home campus library system, the library integrates a small but core collection of print books, journals and audiovisual materials with a large body of electronic resources.

=== Digital Library ===
Provides services that support the scholarly activities of faculty and students. It serves as a repository for research including undergraduate theses, graduate theses and dissertations, faculty publications and datasets, digital archives, course management and learning materials, digital media, and special collections.

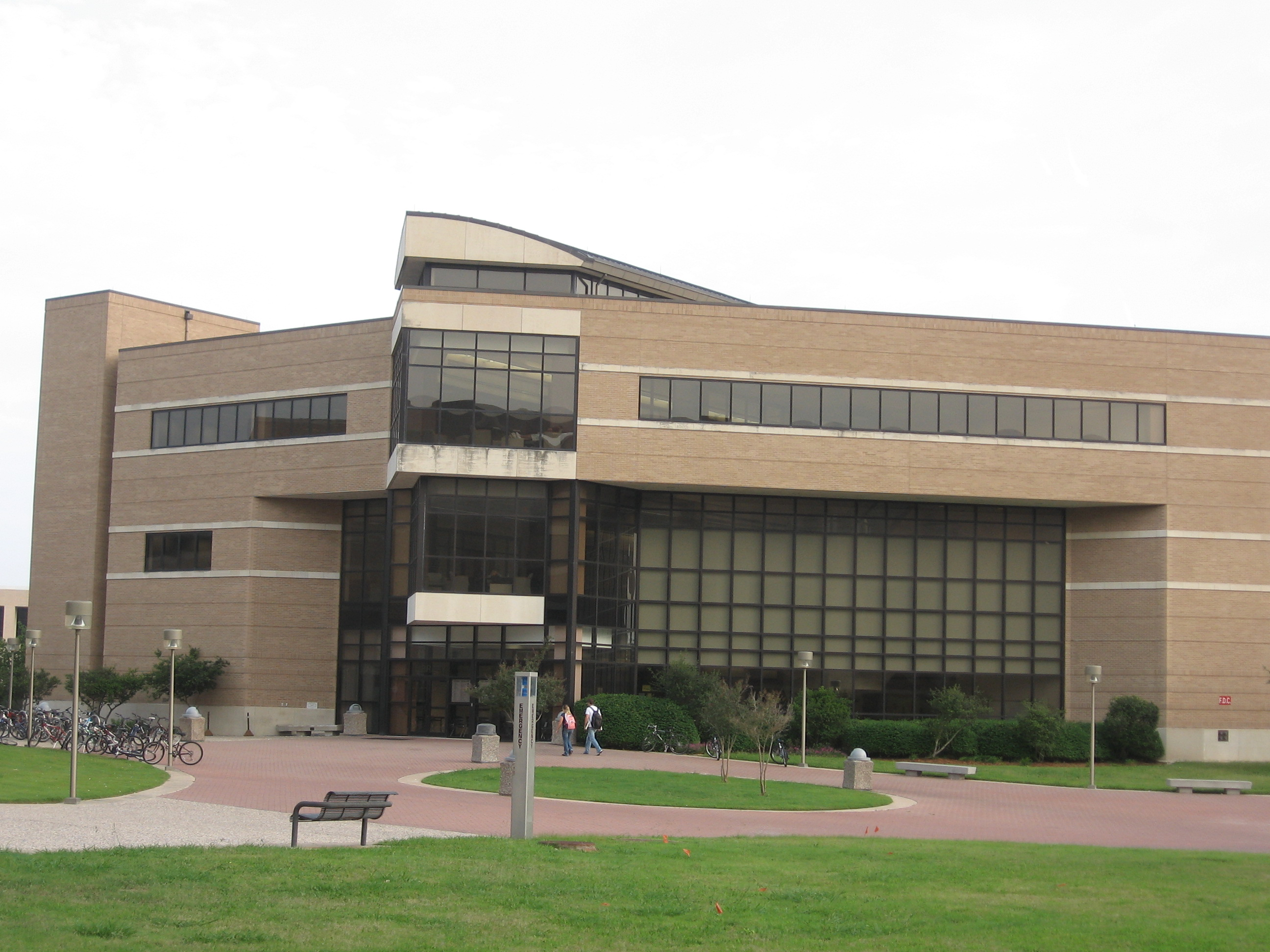
West Campus Library

=== Business Library & Collaboration Commons ===
Providing library resources and services to the Mays Business School, Business Library & Collaboration Commons offers specialized collections of current periodicals, reference works, and monographs in business and agriculture. It houses the patent and trademark depository. In addition to its collections, the Business Library & Collaboration Commons is open 24/5 to meet the needs of students who increasingly stay late to do research and reading for their classes, as well as work on projects.

== 5 Millionth Volume ==
On February 27, 2015 Texas A&M University Libraries added its five millionth volume. George R.R. Martin, author of A Game of Thrones, contributed a rare first edition of The Hobbit by J.R.R. Tolkien.
