= Edward Benjamin Cushing =

- Born: November 22, 1862; Houston, Texas
- Died: February 17, 1924 (aged 61); Houston, Texas
- Education: Texas A&M University
- Occupation(s): Engineer, university administrator
- Employer: Texas A&M University
- Spouse: Florence Abbey Powars
- Parent(s): E.H. Cushing; Matilda Cushing

Edward Benjamin Cushing (November 22, 1862 – February 17, 1924) was an engineer and academic administrator. He served as the chairman of the Board of Regents of Texas A&M University in 1912.

== Biography ==
=== Early life ===
Edward Benjamin Cushing was born in Houston, Texas to E.H. and Matilda Cushing. His father was an outspoken Southern Democrat and owner of The Telegraph, a Houston newspaper. He graduated from the Agricultural and Mechanical College of Texas, now known as Texas A&M University, in 1880.

=== Career ===
He worked as a civil engineer for Southern Pacific Railroad after graduation and served in the U.S. Army. He also served as chief secretary of the Association of Ex-Cadets. He was appointed to the board of directors for the school in 1912, only a year before assuming its presidency.

Later, he personally bankrolled the fledgling Texas A&M University while chairman of the Board of Regents in 1912. His money and campaign prevented a Texas A&M consolidation with the University of Texas at Austin.

=== Personal life ===
In 1888, he married Florence Abbey Powars.

In March 1904, his brother was kidnapped for ransom in West Texas and taken across the border to Mexico.

=== Death ===
He died in Houston in 1924. At the time of his death, he was a bank receiver for First National Bank in Granger, Texas.

=== Legacy ===
In 1930, a library was built at Texas A&M University in memory of Cushing. This represented the first freestanding library on the Texas A&M campus. The Sterling C. Evans Library was constructed in 1968 and became the university's primary library, but the Cushing Library remained as a repository of important university archives.

== Honors and awards ==
- 2006: Distinguished Alumni Award, Texas A&M University
- World War I: Croix de Guerre, France
