= Nazis, Communists, Klansmen, and Others on the Fringe =

1992 book by John George and Laird Wilcox

- Cover of the first edition
- Author: John George, Laird Wilcox
- Language: English
- Subject: Political extremism
- Publisher: Prometheus Books
- Publication date: 1992
- Publication place: United States
- Media type: Print (hardcover)
- Pages: 523
- ISBN: 0-87975-680-2
- OCLC: 24142603
- Dewey Decimal: 324.273
- LC Class: HS2325 .G46 1992

Nazis, Communists, Klansmen, and Others on the Fringe: Political Extremism in America is a 1992 book by John George and Laird Wilcox. It is an examination of political extremism of both the far-left and far-right in the United States. It was first published by Prometheus Books in 1992. In 1996, it was issued in a second edition as American Extremists: Militias, Supremacists, Klansmen, Communists and Others.

The authors attempt to summarize the pre-1960 historical background of American extremist movements, discuss conspiracy theories and their validity, offer their insight on what motivates extremists, and discuss a number of contemporary groups on the "far-left" and "far-right" based principally on their personal contacts with approximately six hundred individual extremists and the extremists' own writings.

== Contents ==
The book contains a Part I, which is a theoretical description and exploration of extremism and its facets. The authors give the history of their personal interest in political extremism. Recognizing their fallibility, and inability to claim "anything approaching complete objectivity", the authors attempted to "make an honest and diligent attempt to be fair and even-handed in our treatment of this subject."

Distinguishing this book from the many covering "extremism" or "extremists" on the market (with their own agenda "to provide a rationale for persecuting or doing away with certain 'extremists'"), the authors' goal was "to provide understanding of a human problem, not a basis for one more round of persecutions." The authors propose a definition of "extremism" based on "the behavioral model", passing up the "normative or "statistical" way" and the "popularity contest" theory. The authors describe their position on the political spectrum as "a bit difficult to pin down"; they "might be most accurately described as pragmatists with libertarian tendencies."

The book then covers several individual groups, movements, and people, both left- and right-wing, across several chapters. Part II is on the far left, and Part III is on the far right. There are several appendices, including one on fake quotes used by groups.

== Publication history ==
It was published by Prometheus Books in 1992 as a 523-page hardcover. In 1996, Prometheus Books republished it as American Extremists: Militias, Supremacists, Klansmen, Communists and Others in a 443-page paperback. The name change was possibly influenced by the resurgence in interest in extremist following the 1995 Oklahoma City bombing.

John George was a professor at the University of Central Oklahoma in sociology and political sciences. His wife, Treva George, also a professor, did the final editing. The coauthor Laird Wilcox was the creator of the Wilcox Collection of Contemporary Political Movements at the University of Kansas.

== Reception ==
Max J. Skidmore for The Kansas City Star praised it as then the "definitive study" on American political extremism. Another review noted it as scholarly and not particularly entertaining, but called it important reading. One reviewer criticized the book's grouping of the John Birch Society with more militant and racist far-righters, and another questioned the comparison of Fidel Castro with Pol Pot. Stephen Sloan, writing for Oklahoma Politics, called it "outstanding". Lin Collette writing for Nova Religio described it as "a very handy guide to so-called fringe/extremist political and religious groups of both the Left and the Right". S. J. Makielski described it as similar to George Thayer's 1968 book The Farther Shores of Politics, though described it as breaking new ground compared to that work. Christopher Phelps was critical of the theoretical overview provided.
