= John George (political scientist) =

American political scientist (1936–2008)

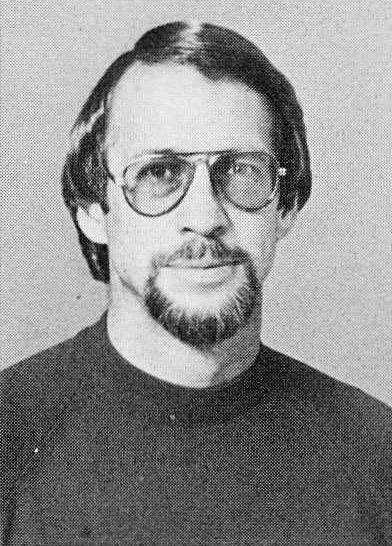
- George in his 1980 staff yearbook photo at the University of Central Oklahoma
- Born: John Herbert George; February 7, 1936; Holdenville, Oklahoma, U.S.
- Died: November 21, 2008 (aged 72); Carlsbad, California, U.S.
- Occupations: Political scientist, professor, author

Academic background
- Education: University of Oklahoma (BA, MA, PhD)

Academic work
- Discipline: Sociology, political science
- Institutions: University of Central Oklahoma
- Notable works: They Never Said It; Nazis, Communists, Klansmen, and Others on the Fringe

John Herbert George (February 7, 1936 – November 21, 2008) was an American political scientist and author. He was a professor of political science and sociology at the University of Central Oklahoma until his retirement in 2000. George received a masters degree in geology from the University of Oklahoma, and worked as a petroleum engineer for several years, only to resign from this job and return to the same institution to study political science. He received a masters degree and PhD in political science. Some of his work focuses were extremism and terrorism.

In 1989, he coauthored a book with Paul F. Boiler Jr. on false quotations, They Never Said It: A Book of Fake Quotes, Misquotes, and Misleading Attributions. He also coauthored 2 books with extremism researcher Laird Wilcox: Nazis, Communists, Klansmen, and Others on the Fringe in 1992, which focused on American political extremism, and Be Reasonable, another book on quotes, in 1994.

== Early life and education ==
John Herbert George was born February 7, 1936, in Holdenville, Oklahoma. He was raised in a Baptist family.

George graduated from the University of Oklahoma in 1958 with a bachelors and then a masters degree in geology. He worked as a petroleum engineer for five years at the companies Conoco and Skelly Oil, before resigning from this job and shifting to work in political science. He returned to university in 1965 and received a masters and then a PhD in political science from the University of Oklahoma. His masters thesis was on extremist groups.

== Career ==
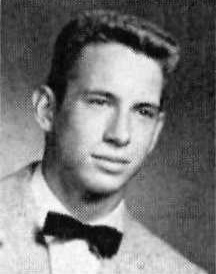
George in his 1955 yearbook photo at the University of Oklahoma

George became a professor of political science and sociology at University of Central Oklahoma, joining the UCO faculty in 1968. In 1994, George was recognized by the Oklahoma Political Science Association as their Oklahoma Political Science Scholar of the Year. His work focuses included political extremism and terrorism. The Daily Oklahoman described him in 2000 as "Oklahoma's leading authority on extremists and hate groups". He also taught sociology and politics of sports, as well as terrorism and politics.

In 1995, he testified to a panel of a house judiciary subcommittee on the dangers of militia groups; he told the committee very few extremists were dangerous. In 2001, he was featured on a C-SPAN panel as one of two terrorism experts. He retired from UCO in 2000. He moved with his wife to California for his retirement. The University of Central Oklahoma maintains a collection of his donated materials on extremist groups, the Dr. John George Collection, originally donated to the university following his retirement.

== Works ==
George has coauthored several books. His first, published in 1989 by Oxford University Press and coauthored with Paul F. Boller Jr., then a professor emeritus of history at Texas Christian University, was They Never Said It: A Book of Fake Quotes, Misquotes, and Misleading Attributions. The book aims to expose and discuss misleading, misquoted, and hoax quotations, with a particular focus on quotations fabricated in service of a political cause.

He then coauthored Nazis, Communists, Klansmen, and Others on the Fringe with extremism researcher Laird Wilcox in 1992, published by Prometheus Books. They discuss the varieties of American extremism and give a theoretical overview of extremism. An appendix also contains a section on falsified quotes. Following the resurgence in public and scholarly interest in extremism following the 1995 Oklahoma City bombing, the book was republished in a second edition in 1996 as American Extremists: Militias, Supremacists, Communists & Others.

In 1994, Wilcox and George authored a second book together, again published by Prometheus Books: Be Reasonable: Selected Quotations for Inquiring Minds. This collects quotes related to freedom of expression and skepticism.

== Personal life and death ==
George described his primary ideology as "anti-authoritarian" and said that he was for free expression regardless of source. He said that he was pro-American and "75 percent libertarian, 15 percent liberal and 10 percent conservative". He advocated for the legalization of marijuana, mandatory school uniforms, religious freedom, and against the income tax. Though raised Baptist, he was an atheist. George had an interest in karate. He earned a black belt aged 32, studying under Jack Hwang. He was also a swimmer; he placed fifth in the 200-metre backstroke at the 1986 U.S. Masters Swimming Championships.

He was married to Treva George. She was a professor of Spanish and psychology at Rose State College.

He voiced his support for the First Amendment; he argued that while most Americans support the First Amendment in theory, they reject it in practice, not allowing speech they consider to be offensive, whether from communists or Nazis. He was a member of the Congress of Racial Equality and the NAACP. George stated in 1993 that he believed extremists were "more a danger to themselves than the rest of us"; he argued against suppressing hate groups, writing instead that we should counter them with our own words. Following the 1995 Oklahoma City bombing, which happened in his city, he expressed his shock and said: "You expect this kind of thing in [a major city]. We're not even a hub for a major airline. There are so many nuts loose in our society."

George died from cancer in Carlsbad, California on November 21, 2008.

== Bibliography ==
- Boller, Paul F. Jr.; —— (1989). They Never Said It: A Book of Fake Quotes, Misquotes, and Misleading Attributions. New York: Oxford University Press. ISBN 0-19-506469-0.
- ——; Wilcox, Laird (1992). Nazis, Communists, Klansmen, and Others on the Fringe: Political Extremism in America. Buffalo: Prometheus Books. ISBN 0-87975-680-2.
  - ——; Wilcox, Laird (1996). American Extremists: Militias, Supremacists, Klansmen, Communists & Others (2nd ed.). Amherst: Prometheus Books. ISBN 1-57392-058-4.
- Wilcox, Laird; —— (1994). Be Reasonable: Selected Quotations for Inquiring Minds. Buffalo: Prometheus Books. ISBN 0-87975-867-8.
