= Laird Wilcox =

American extremism researcher (1942–2023)

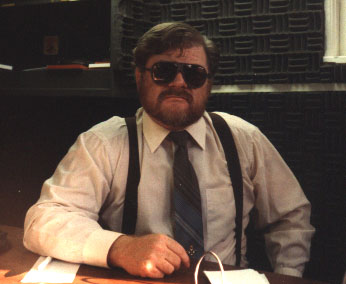
- Wilcox in the 2000s
- Born: Laird Maurice Wilcox; November 28, 1942; San Francisco, California, U.S.
- Died: November 4, 2023 (aged 80); Olathe, Kansas, U.S.
- Education: University of Kansas
- Children: 3

Laird Maurice Wilcox III (November 28, 1942 – November 4, 2023) was an American author and researcher of political fringe movements. He was the founder of the Wilcox Collection of Contemporary Political Movements, housed in the Kenneth Spencer Research Library at the University of Kansas. He operated the Laird Wilcox Editorial Research Center, with which he published materials focusing on the topic of extremism.

Wilcox operated two annual periodicals focusing on right-wing and left-wing political organizations, Guide to the American Left and Guide to the American Right. He coauthored 2 books with political scientist and professor John George: Nazis, Communists, Klansmen, and Others on the Fringe (1992), which focused on American political extremism, and Be Reasonable (1994), a book on skeptical quotes.

== Early life and education ==
Laird Maurice Wilcox III was born November 28, 1942, in San Francisco, California. His parents were Laird Wilcox Jr. and AuDeene Stromer Wilcox. His father was a construction accountant and a WWII veteran. His family moved frequently; Wilcox was raised in Broken Hills, Nevada, then moved to California; they then moved to Minnesota, Texas, Pennsylvania, Maryland, and Louisana, before settling in Kansas City. He was raised in a family with, as he described, "political intensity", with relatives' politics ranging from socialist to membership in the far-right John Birch Society.

Wilcox attended the University of Kansas from 1963 to 1966. He joined the Students for a Democratic Society and later dropped out of college. While living in Olathe, Kansas, he worked as carpenter, investigator and writer. In addition, he was a Special Deputy Sheriff in Shawnee and Wyandotte County.

== Wilcox Collection of Contemporary Political Movements ==
In the 1960s, Wilcox began collecting politically extreme material. In 1965, after Wilcox had accumulated four file drawers of literature about radical political movements, some since his teens, the University of Kansas library bought a portion of it for $1,000. The collection, now called the Wilcox Collection of Contemporary Political Movements, is kept in the Kansas Collection of Kenneth Spencer Research Library.

It includes literature relating to, according to the university, "more than 10,000 individuals and organizations. [...] The bulk of the collection covers 1960 to the present and comprises nearly 10,000 books, pamphlets and periodicals, 800 audio tapes, 73 feet (22 m) of manuscript materials and more than 100,000 pieces of ephemera including flyers, brochures, mailings, clippings and bumper stickers." From then through at least 1992, Wilcox continued sending two or three boxes each month to add to the collection. In 1986 Reason described the collection as among the largest archives of extremist material.

== Works ==
He ran the Laird Wilcox Editorial Research Center. Wilcox maintained annual directories of left-wing and right-wing groups from 1979 to 1999, Guide to the American Left and Guide to the American Right. Historian George Michael described him as a "keen observer of extremist politics". Michael described the directory of the right as "the most comprehensive directory of right-wing groups in America" at that time.

In 1992, he coauthored the book Nazis, Communists, Klansmen, and Others on the Fringe with political scientist and professor John George. It was published by Prometheus Books. They discuss the varieties of American extremism and give a theoretical overview of extremism. Following the resurgence in public and scholarly interest in extremism following the 1995 Oklahoma City bombing, the book was republished in a second edition in 1996 as American Extremists: Militias, Supremacists, Communists & Others. In 1994, Wilcox and George authored a second book together, again published by Prometheus Books: Be Reasonable: Selected Quotations for Inquiring Minds. This collects quotes related to freedom of expression and skepticism.

Wilcox was frequently critical of anti-extremism "watchdog" organizations for their tactics in combating extremism and their media practices, and, for some of them, having their own extremist ties. In his 1997 self-published book The Watchdogs, Wilcox criticized an "anti-racist industry" of groups monitoring extremism, writing that their "identity and livelihood depend upon growth and expansion of their particular kind of victimization". He discusses the scandals that some of the watchdog groups have been involved with. Wilcox covered similar ground in a 2002 chapter in the academic anthology The Cultic Milieu: Oppositional Subcultures in an Age of Globalization, edited by Jeffrey Kaplan and Helene Lööw.

Wilcox accused groups including the Southern Poverty Law Center (SPLC), the Anti-Defamation League (ADL), Center for Democratic Renewal (CDR), and Political Research Associates (PRA) of a "massive extortion racket" to exaggerate threats from right-wing extremists, whom he estimated at 10,000 in a total US population of 270 million. In response, Mark Potok of the SPLC said that Wilcox "had an ax to grind for a great many years", and Chip Berlet of PRA (who Wilcox had criticized) said that Wilcox "is not an accurate or ethical reporter" and could not tolerate competition. Historian George Michael noted that Wilcox's examination of memoranda indicated a close working relationship between the ADL and the FBI.

== Awards ==
In 1989, Wilcox received the Kansas City Area Archivists Award of Excellence for founding and maintaining the Wilcox Collection. He was awarded the Myers Center Award in 1993 for the Study of Human Rights in the United States, and in 1994 he was awarded the Freedom of Information Award of the Kansas Library Association/SIRS "for outstanding commitment to intellectual freedom".

In 1995, he received the Mencken Award of the Free Press Association "for outstanding journalism in defense of liberty". In 2005, the University of Kansas honored Wilcox, then 63, in the Spencer library's North Gallery for his role in founding the Wilcox Collection.

== Personal life and death ==
He was married to Cheryl Wilcox, with whom he had two daughters and a son. In 1968, Wilcox signed the "Writers and Editors War Tax Protest" pledge, vowing to refuse tax payments in protest against the Vietnam War. He was a member of Amnesty International and an on-and-off again member of the American Civil Liberties Union starting in 1961. Historian George Michael described Wilcox in 2003 as a left-wing libertarian. He was a member of the National Rifle Association of America.

Wilcox died at the Olathe Medical Center on November 4, 2023, Olathe, Kansas. He was 80 years old.

== Publications ==
=== Periodicals ===
- Guide to the American Left, annual. Kansas City, Mo.: Editorial Research Service (1984–). ISSN 0894-4547. OCLC 11857054
- Guide to the American Right, annual. Kansas City, Mo.: Editorial Research Service (1984–). ISSN 8756-0216. OCLC 11859906.

=== Books ===
- —— (1980). Master Bibliography: Political Psychology and Propaganda, Espionage and Intelligence Operations, Terrorism and Assassination. Olathe: Editorial Research Service.
- George, John; —— (1992). Nazis, Communists, Klansmen, and Others on the Fringe: Political Extremism in America. Buffalo: Prometheus Books. ISBN 0-87975-680-2.
  - George, John; —— (1996). American Extremists: Militias, Supremacists, Klansmen, Communists & Others (2nd ed.). Amherst: Prometheus Books. ISBN 1-57392-058-4.
- ——; George, John (1994). Be Reasonable: Selected Quotations for Inquiring Minds. Buffalo: Prometheus Books. ISBN 0-87975-867-8.
- —— (1994). Crying Wolf: Hate Crime Hoaxes in America. Olathe: Editorial Research Service. ISBN 0-933592-78-7.
  - —— (2019). Crying Wolf: Hate Crime Hoaxes in America: 25th Anniversary Edition, 1994–2019. Olathe: Editorial Research Service.
- —— (1998). The Watchdogs: A Close Look at Anti-Racist "Watchdog" Groups. Olathe: Editorial Research Service. ISBN 0-993892-89-2. OCLC 41181948.
  - —— (1999). The Watchdogs: A Close Look at Anti-Racist "Watchdog" Groups (2nd ed.). Olathe: Editorial Research Service. ISBN 0-933592-96-5. OCLC 43739750.
- —— (2002). ""Who Watches the Watchman?": Another Side to the Watchdog Groups". In Kaplan, Jeffrey; Lööw, Heléne (eds.). The Cultic Milieu: Oppositional Subcultures in an Age of Globalization. Walnut Creek: AltaMira Press. pp. 290–343. ISBN 0-7591-0203-1.
