= Wyatt Kaldenberg =

American white supremacist (born 1957)

- Born: Wyatt Clay Kaldenberg; 1957 (age 68–69); California, United States
- Education: Otero Junior College
- Occupations: Writer, magazine editor
- Years active: 1978–present
- Organization(s): Ásatrú Free Assembly, Odinist Fellowship, White Aryan Resistance
- Notable work: Pagan Revival
- Movement: Odinism

Wyatt Clay Kaldenberg (born 1957) is an American white supremacist writer and Odinist. A member of the New Left in his youth, he then became a white supremacist, and edited a white supremacist Trotskyist paper, Democratic Socialist: Voice of the New Aryan Left. A convert to Odinism in the 1970s, he was a member of Stephen McNallen's Ásatrú Free Assembly, but left after McNallen attempted to remove Nazis from the group.

With several others, Kaldenberg formed the Los Angeles chapter of Else Christensen's Odinist Fellowship group. After conflicting with Christensen, he joined Tom Metzger's neo-Nazi organization White Aryan Resistance (WAR) in 1984, and became the managing editor of their paper WAR. He continued his promotion of Odinism, and created a periodical focused on it, Pagan Revival, in the 1990s. He later claimed to renounce white supremacy.

== Early life ==
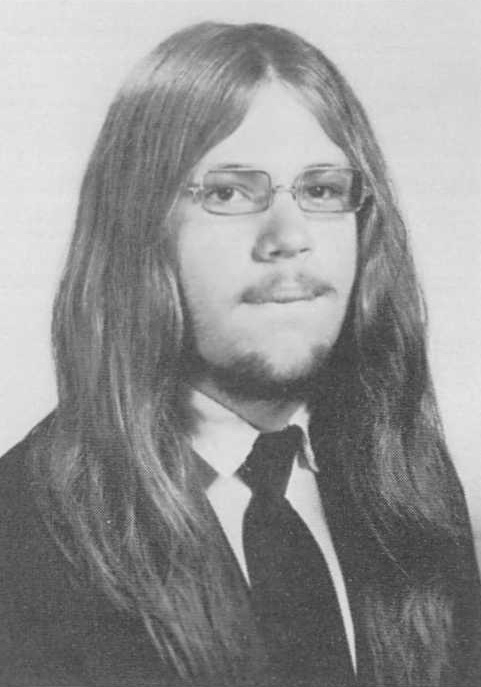
Kaldenberg's 1975 high school senior yearbook photo

Wyatt Clay Kaldenberg was born in 1957 in a working-class Mormon family in a small California town in the Mojave Desert. The town was all-white. He was a member of the New Left for a time; as a teenager he was associated with the Young Socialist Alliance, a Trotskyist organization. He received an associate of arts degree from Otero Junior College in 1980.

Enrolling in a Job Corps training programme in Salt Lake City in the 1970s, Kaldenberg claims he became "aware of racial realities" after having fights with blacks and Muslims. After he learned about the Nation of Islam, Kaldenberg desired an equivalent faith for white people, and became involved in Odinism. Despite his conversion to white supremacy, he continued promoting socialist politics; he edited a white supremacist Trotskyist newspaper, called Democratic Socialist: Voice of the New Aryan Left.

== White supremacy ==
Kaldenberg was briefly involved with Stephen McNallen's Ásatrú Free Assembly (AFA), a "folkish" neopagan organization, in the 1970s but left when McNallen attempted to remove Nazis from that organization, considering Nazi-style totalitarianism to be at odds with the pagan worldview. Kaldenberg, in turn, considered McNallen to be insufficiently racist. Kaldenberg and other "Aryanists" who left the AFA at that time went on to found the Greater Los Angeles area chapter of the Odinist Fellowship of Else Christensen. This was one of the Fellowship's most active branches.

Christensen at times clashed with the more openly militant Nazi members of the fellowship, who saw her as insufficiently outspoken in her politics. At the same time, Tom Metzger, the leader of the openly neo-Nazi White Aryan Resistance (WAR) group, was making inroads with Odinists and frequently visited Kaldenberg's Los Angeles chapter. With increasing friction between Christensen and her more militant followers and media reports of violence committed by Odinists, she encouraged her followers to lessen their militancy; in response, members of the Los Angeles chapter split into other groups. In 1984, Kaldenberg joined Metzger's WAR, attracted to it by Metzger's embrace of Third Positionist ideology and violence.

He was the managing editor of their paper WAR until 1989. For many years, Kaldenberg was one of the leading suspects of the person behind the cartoons in the paper, done under the pseudonym A. Wyatt Mann, based on the fact that he was a white supremacist and his name was Wyatt. The actual artist was Nick Bougas, though this was not proven until 2015. Kaldenberg denied that he was behind the cartoons, stating in 2014 that: "I am not A Wyatt Man. Nick Bogus is A Wyatt Man.You can't commission art work from me because I can't draw worth shit. I have never drawn a cartoon in my life. I know about a billion websites throughout cyber space claim I am A Wyatt Man, but they are all full of shit."

While involved with WAR, he promoted ties with the punk scene and suggested that Metzger appeal to skinheads and racist music fans. Kaldenberg was featured as a guest in an episode of the Metzger-hosted public-access television show Race and Reason, which aired in November 1989. When Metzger's son was featured on Geraldo Rivera's talk show Geraldo, Kaldenberg attended alongside him. A brawl ensued, and Kaldenberg broke Rivera's nose. This resulted in much publicity.

In October 1990, the Southern Poverty Law Center and the Anti-Defamation League won a civil judgement against Metzger and WAR on behalf of the family of Mulugeta Seraw, who was murdered by white power skinheads associated with the group. Metzger then encouraged his supporters to send donations to Kaldenberg rather than to him or to WAR, in order to avoid paying the judgement. In January 1991, Kaldenberg was the subject of a court order freezing his funds, pending court review. Just hours after the order was issued, he began withdrawing money from the frozen account, and was ordered to return it by a San Diego municipal judge. When Kaldenberg refused to obey the order, he was sentenced to 10 days in jail for contempt of court. He was released after serving 17 hours of his sentence.

Kaldenberg promoted WAR online into the 1990s. He became somewhat notorious online in the mid-1990s for disrupting Usenet newsgroups and for suggesting white supremacists infiltrate non-racist newsgroups and spread racist propaganda there; Kaldenberg was one of several white supremacists to infiltrate the alt.fan.oj-simpson newsgroup as a home for white supremacy following O. J. Simpson's 1995 acquittal for the murder of his wife Nicole Brown Simpson and Ron Goldman. Kaldenberg began publishing the Odinist paper Pagan Revival in the 1990s; published irregularly, it was initially a newsletter, then an online magazine, before being revived in 1998 as a print tabloid magazine. It was described as "a voice of Eurocentric polytheistic communities."

According to BuzzFeed News, as of 2015 Kaldenberg had claimed to renounce white supremacy.

== Views ==
A 2023 analysis described Kaldenberg as "a central figure for racial pagan revivalism in the United States". After leaving the AFA, Kaldenberg developed a distinct variety of Odinism. He devalues spirituality and ceremony and rejects Judaism and Christianity. According to Nicholas Goodrick-Clarke, Kaldenberg's version of the ideology is "chiefly a cult of aristocracy, power and the propagation of the white race." Mattias Gardell wrote that "socialism, racism, and Odinism would constitute the platform of Kaldenberg's worldview for decades, eventually merging with an evolving misanthropy." Describing his conflict with the ideology of McNallen, Kaldenberg described himself as racist, and wrote:

McNallen was never racial, and we didn’t have the same ideas. I wanted to make Odinism into a white Nation of Islam, and he didn't go there. He never used the word Aryan or white. He said folkish a little now and then, but when you said race, he'd turn pink. [...] You’re either racist or not racist. Either you are on the bus or you are not. There is nothing in between.

In his articles for the WAR newspaper, Kaldenberg promoted Odinism. Goodrick-Clarke described his articles for the newspaper as "spew[ing] a stream of abusive misanthropy and violent rhetoric to promote a white revolution". His articles provoked criticism from Christian Identity adherents (Christian Identity being a white supremacist interpretation of Christianity). In his articles for Pagan Revival, he avowed open racism in contrast with Christensen's strategy of more coded language and avoidance of explicit Nazism, writing that: "The people who are really antiracial, when they come in and figure out that you really use code words, they got turned off, and the people who are racial when they see that you are using code words, they’re thinking that you are a pantywaist, so you can't win."

Gardell considered Kaldenberg's ideology to be "a pronounced Manichean paganism, his worldview being based on the continuous struggle between the Aryan children of the sun and the demonic followers of the demiurge Yahweh", noting the intense violence of his ideology and his portrayal of Jews as agents of the Demiurge. He did not deny the Holocaust and was frequently critical of Holocaust deniers; he viewed the Holocaust as justified, and saw Holocaust denial as making Adolf Hitler look weak. He suggested that neo-Nazis should turn concentration camps into holy sites. Due to his violent rhetoric, many other white supremacist pagans conflicted with Kaldenberg. However, noting contradictions between his personality and his writings, Gardell wrote that it "left at least this author with the impression that Kaldenberg was not always altogether sincere in his rambling exhortations to unfettered violence".

He praised the black Muslim organization the Nation of Islam as a model of racism that white people should emulate, saying they "do everything right", in contrast to white supremacists, who only "bitch about the system". Later on, his ideology became increasingly misanthropic, and he came to hate most white people as well, considering them "cattle"; instead of mobilizing the people, he suggested they needed a "White racist dictatorship to force the cattle to want survival’". He advocated a lone wolf approach rather than Christensen's strategy of creating pagan communities, seeing that as hopeless.

== Written works ==
- Odinism: The Religion of Our Germanic Ancestors in the Modern World (2011)
- Odinism in the Age of Man: The Dark Age Before the Return of Our Gods (2011)
- Perceived Heathenism and Odinic Prayer: A Book of Heathen Prayer and Direct Contact with Our Living Gods (2011)
- Folkish Odinism (2013)
- Why Nazism and White Racism Suck And Do Nothing But Empower Leftists And Hurt The White Race (2011)
- A Heathen Family Devotional: Odinism Begins at Home (2011)
- Heathen Family Prayer for Beginners: A Collection of Odinic Prayers for Families New to Odinism, Volume 1 (2011)
- Odinism: Inside the Belly of the Beast: Essays on Heathenism inside The New World Order (2011)
- Skertru Now: Issue 2, April 2013, Volume 2 (2013), with Skergard, Volundr Lars Agnarsson, and Skuli Magnusson
- The Oera Linda Book: A Neo-Pagan Fantasy Novel (Introduction)
- Early Writings that Helped Shape American Odinism, Volume 1 (2012), with other writers
- 9 Worlds of Hex Magic paperback by Hunter Yoder (featured interview)
- The Death of the White Race
