= Race and Reason =

American television talk show

- Genre: Talk show
- Created by: Tom Metzger
- Presented by: Tom Metzger
- Country of origin: United States
- Original language: English

Production
- Producer: David Wiley
- Running time: 30 minutes

Original release
- Network: Various
- Release: September 28, 1984 – 1997

Race and Reason is an American public-access television talk show created by Tom Metzger, the leader of the white supremacist group White Aryan Resistance (WAR). It was moderated by Metzger and produced by members of WAR. Episodes were a half hour long; several significant white supremacist figures were interviewed on the program, as were several Holocaust deniers. It had stopped airing by the late 1990s.

It was established in September 1984 in San Diego, California. The show was taped in California by Metzger and members of WAR, and then distributed on videotape throughout the nation. By 1988, it aired in 10 different states and 55 cities, put into public-access television locally by Metzger's sympathizers. Judith Michaelson, writing for the Los Angeles Times, said that on Race and Reason, "racial slurs are commonplace, the suggestion that Asians and other minorities should be stopped at the U.S. border is routine, and the allegation that Jews run the country is frequent".

Race and Reason was controversial throughout its existence and resulted in protests and debates over the extent of free speech on television almost everywhere that it was aired. Several cities contemplated removing public access broadcasting rather than allow the show to be telecast. Other responses included encouraging black and Jewish communities to make their own programs or showing "counter-programs". The reveal of its filming at the campus of California State University, Fullerton led to student protests in 1986. The program was influential among white supremacists and helped raise Metzger's media profile.

== Background ==
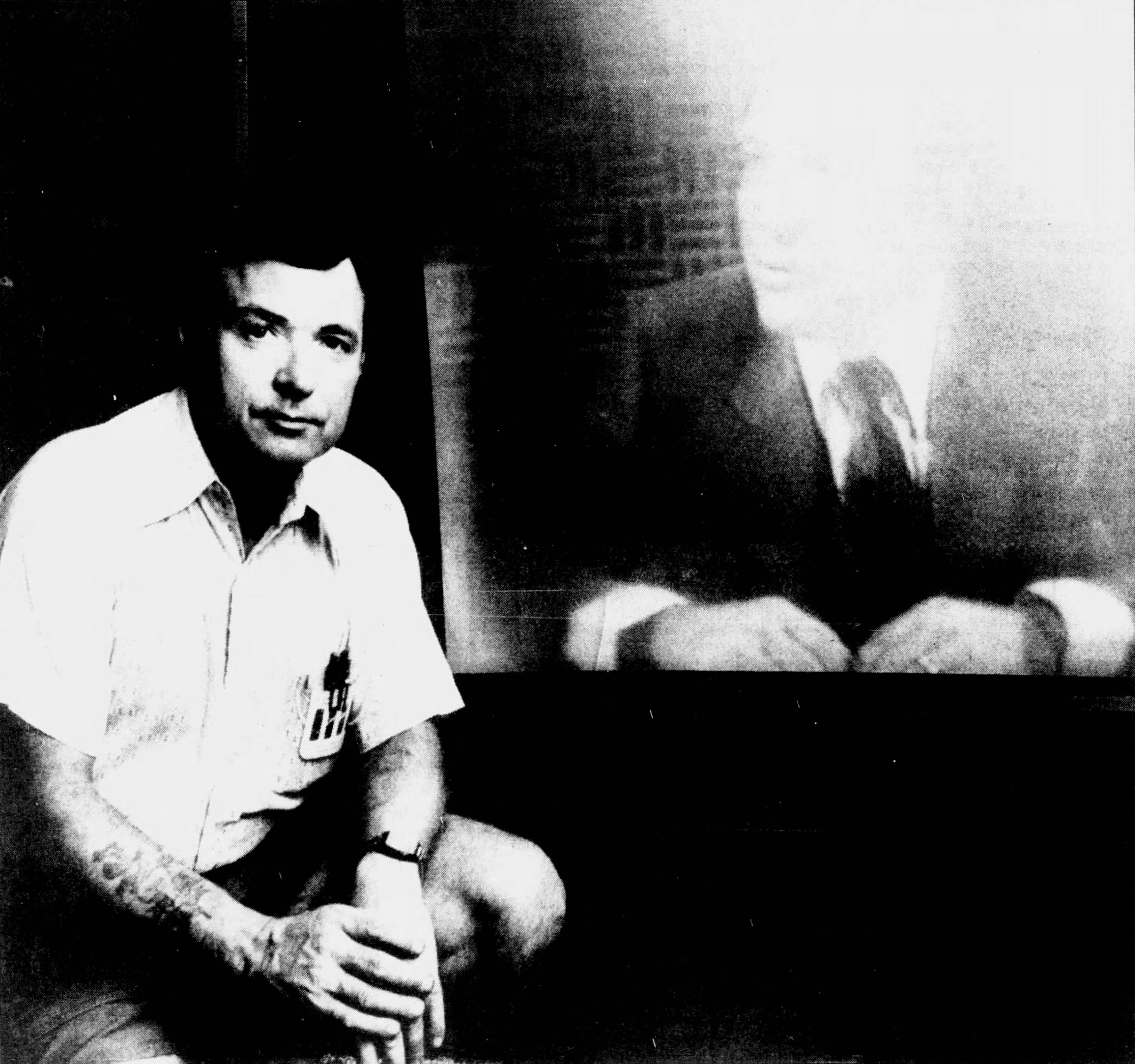
Tom Metzger in 1984, in front of a TV displaying Race and Reason

Tom Metzger was a former Grand Dragon of the Ku Klux Klan having left the Ku Klux Klan to form his own neo-Nazi organization, the White American Political Association, later the White Aryan Resistance (WAR). Metzger also established a newspaper for the organization, also called WAR, which described itself as "The Newspaper of the International White Racist". Metzger had previously run in the 1980 San Diego County congressional race as a Democrat. In an upset, he won the Democratic Party primary; the other Democratic party members were so against his racial views they instead supported his Republican opponent, who won by a large margin.

Metzger had served in the United States Army where he worked as an electronics technician. After exiting the army, he was a television repairman by trade, and had previously created and sold video tapes of his public appearances in white supremacy. After reading a report about the rules of public-access television—by law, public-access channels were required to air almost anything their local subscribers submitted to them without speech restrictions, except for ones considered obscene—it occurred to Metzger that this would be a useful outlet for WAR.

Production of Race and Reason began in July 1984. Metzger's followers and his son, John Metzger, began using the filming equipment of California State University, Fullerton to film the program, recording it at the university's Instructional Media Center. Members of WAR were trained to operate TV cameras to help Metzger create the show, and John Metzger and the other WAR members took free courses in television production. At the time, the company Group W had a deal with CSUF, lending it their equipment while having the university be their primary public access recording location. The agreement indicated that anyone be allowed to use the equipment for public access, in accordance with laws on cable access.

== History ==
Race and Reason debuted on September 28, 1984, on the public-access channel 24 of Cox Cable in San Diego, California. It started out with six filmed episodes with David Wiley as cohost; the debut episode included interviews with several Odinists; other episodes in the initial set included interviews with a Holocaust denier, a Ku Klux Klan leader, a Muslim fundamentalist, and a white supremacist religious leader. The show was initially going to be named simply Race, before being renamed Race and Reason shortly after. The show was named after the book by segregationist writer Carleton Putnam, Race and Reason: A Yankee's View, which is focused on criticizing racial integration.

It launched to immediate controversy due to its contents; local companies refused to air it when they had the option (e.g., Carlsbad Cablevision refused because, as Metzger was not a resident of Carlsbad, they were allowed discretion on materials). Due to the rules around public-access telecasting, the show proved difficult to cancel; it did not violate any of the rules against obscenity for cable programming.

Morris Casuto of the Anti-Defamation League met with Cox Cable and attempted to find a loophole to use to cancel the show, and simultaneously said the show would be a failure like Metzger's previous political efforts. The next year, he said that while the ADL disliked the fact that Metzger had a television show, they were "cheered" that it appeared that few watched it. Metzger complained to the Times-Advocate that it was hypocritical of cable companies to not air his show "while they cry about freedom of speech and try to keep the Playboy Channel on the air". Cablevision's programming director said: "Although the show is done under the guise of reasonable discussion, it's nothing but racist propaganda."

In 1984 and 1985, the show appeared on the public-access channel 25 in San Francisco, resulting in protests. When the program first aired on Chicago's public-access channel 19, the channel was picketed by fifty protestors. It was also aired on Group W's public-access Channel 38. In September 1986, it aired in Pocatello, Idaho, again resulting in controversy; unable to block the telecast, a call-in channel was held after it played, with several people calling in to protest.

In April 1986, that Metzger utilized CSUF facilities to produce Race and Reason was publicized by the CSUF campus newspaper, The Daily Titan. This resulted in outrage and protests from hundreds of CSUF students for several weeks. Protestors asked the university to drop its agreement with Group W, therefore dropping Metzger by extension. The filming equipment was also nonfunctional at this time; Metzger pledged to resume operations when he could.

The CSUF faculty voted for a study of questions raised by the affair, and called for putting disclaimers on all tapes produced at the university that said the CSUF had no affiliation with their contents. University president Jewel Plummer Cobb declared her opposition to the program but refused to prevent its distribution, citing freedom of speech. By May, Group W announced it would move its facilities off the university campus and to their main office; they said that this had been under discussion prior to the controversy. Metzger continued to use Group W's equipment at the new location in Los Angeles. He complained about the end of the protests, saying they had gotten him publicity. He told the Los Angeles Times that the controversy had resulted in "a lot of mail and applications for membership. [...] What can I say? I've got good enemies."

Several cities contemplated removing public access broadcasting rather than allow the show to be telecast. In Kansas City, Klan members tried to get the show on air; as it was produced in California, not locally in Kansas, it was not allowed to be telecast (some cities had restrictions on public-access shows and mandated they be produced locally). In response, the KKK started their own public access show, the Klansas City Klable. In 1988, rather than have the show be broadcast, the Kansas City council voted to end their public-access channels. The American Civil Liberties Union and the KKK members then sued, claiming this was a First Amendment violation. Due to the lawsuit the decision was later reversed. Cincinnati attempted a similar strategy in 1987, though did not go through with it following protests. Other responses included encouraging black and Jewish communities to make their own programs to "drown out" Race and Reason, or showing "counter-programs" alongside it.

Even after Tom Metzger lost a high profile lawsuit involving the Southern Poverty Law Center following a murder committed by his followers, the show continued into the 1990s. It was still running by 1995. According to The Oregonian, it had ceased by 1997.

== Production and distribution ==
Race and Reason episodes had a runtime of half an hour. At its debut, there were 6 episodes, by 1985, 18, by 1986, 35; by 1988, 63, and by 1996, over 100. New episodes were typically filmed twice a month though there were stretches where it was not filmed at all. Metzger continued to work as a repairman while the show was ongoing. Metzger's son John Metzger assisted in the production, with David Wiley, a WAR leader, as producer. It was financially supported by Alexander Foxe; as the show was largely produced by volunteers, cost overall was reduced. Metzger would record the show's master tapes, which would be distributed nationally to his supporters. The program was locally sponsored by individual supporters with a variety of affiliations, who then took them to their local cable companies and had them telecast on public-access channels. Cable companies that platformed Race and Reason sometimes refused to list it in their television guides, or issued disclaimers. The repeated controversies were embraced by Metzger; Metzger suggested that his followers submit letters complaining about the program and pretending to be anti-racists to get them more publicity.

Metzger managed to get the program on public-access Channel 38 in Southern California. Areas Race and Reason was distributed in included several in its home state of California, as well as Pennsylvania. Individual areas in Texas, Georgia, New York, and Tennessee also had the program. By 1988, it was aired in ten states and 55 cities. Cities it aired in at one time or another included San Francisco, Memphis, Atlanta, Las Vegas, Los Angeles, Phoenix, Dublin, California, Raleigh, Pittsburgh, Chicago, Richmond, Portland, Escondido, Chatsworth, Austin, Norman, Pocatello, Spokane, and Corvallis. William White Williams and Harold Covington collaborated to sponsor the program in North Carolina. In Norwood, Ohio, it was sponsored by the SS Action Group, in Dublin by Clinton Sipes, and in Pocatello by Stan Sorenson.

Metzger coordinated the distribution of the program through his WAR newspaper, requesting that his readers help him distribute the program. One such call read:

Why haven't you contacted your cable company yet to get an Aryan show on TV? Write Race & Reason care of WAR to find out how to go about it. Do it today, instead of just complaining about Jew TV. Jews didn't take over TV by sitting around complaining and you won't liberate the TV from them by anything other than guts and action.

Tapes of the show were sold for markets the program did not air in. The WAR newspaper listed cable systems that carried Race and Reason. In Florida and Atlanta, there existed a locally produced iteration of Race and Reason, which operated differently and was hosted by Herbert Poinsett, an ally of Metzger. This version had produced 40 to 50 episodes by 1989, incorporating parts of Metzger's version.

== Content ==
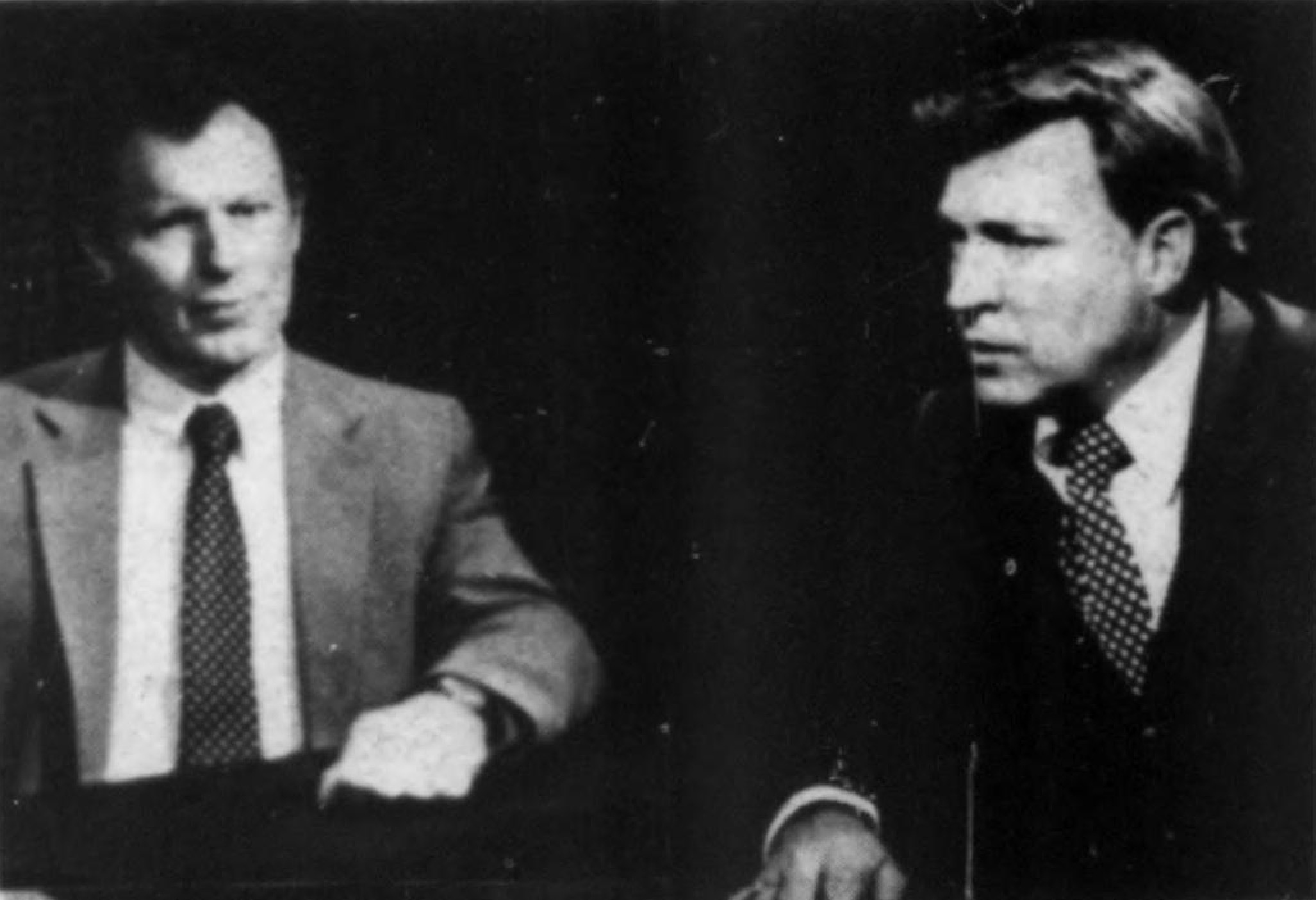
Photograph on set of Metzger (right) interviewing Ed Fields for the program, circa 1986

Race and Reason was a talk show, primarily hosted and moderated by Metzger. He would typically dress in suit and tie. Elinor Langer noted it as, like much public-access telecasting, frequently amateurish, in this case "at times to the point of parody". While initially amateur, the show became more professional in its style over time. While most episodes were hosted by Metzger, a few had other hosts, such as Roy Frankhouser (who himself appeared on the show as a guest).

Judith Michaelson, writing for the Los Angeles Times, said that on the show, "racial slurs are commonplace, the suggestion that Asians and other minorities should be stopped at the U.S. border is routine, and the allegation that Jews run the country is frequent". Michael Novick said the contents of the show were far tamer than the WAR newspaper, arguing that it was "carefully designed to legitimize Metzger", lacking "open advocacy of race war and racist revolutionism". Mark S. Hamm said that on the show, Metzger "elevate[d] the traditional message of hate espoused in secret Klan rallies into the white heat of electronic public performance." Metzger denied that Race and Reason the show was racist (though said on multiple occasions that he, personally, was) saying anyone could appear on the show provided that they were controversial; Metzger said to Times-Advocate that above all, he wanted to interview controversial people. Robert D. Purvis argued that the basic focus of the series was white separatism.

High profile figures in the white supremacist movement were interviewed, including Richard Girnt Butler of the Aryan Nations, J. B. Stoner of the National States' Rights Party, and Ben Klassen, the founder of the white supremacist religion Creativity. In the 1990s, the white supremacist James Mason was interviewed in a three part interview. The show also interviewed several Holocaust deniers. Hamm noted a 1987 telecast as emblematic of the show's rhetoric, where WAR member David Mazzella said on the show that: "We can start gassing all the niggers and get rid of them because there’s no need to keep paying taxes on their worthless lives."

White power bands were frequently featured, often promoted by Metzger. Muslims and black nationalists were also interviewed—Metzger claimed that he attempted to get Louis Farrakhan on the show— as was the American television host Wally George. Metzger claimed the program was dedicated to free speech and was "a white man's talk show". The typical introduction for the show featured piano music and the message: "This is Tom Metzger, your host for Race and Reason, that island of free speech in a sea of controlled and managed news."

== Response and influence ==
By its nature, Race and Reason was frequently controversial, and frequently resulted in debates over the extent of free speech on television. Writer Elinor Langer wrote that it "created outrage wherever it became known", while Michael Novick said it "has been met with protests everywhere it airs". Michael Cox noted that "its visibility [was] enhanced by frequent local debates about the suitability of exposing viewers to the militantly bigoted viewpoints expressed by Metzger and his guests", though said the actual influence and viewership of the program, like the skinhead movement as a whole, was difficult to gauge. In a study of the show's influence on skinhead terrorists, scholar Mark S. Hamm found little interest; many, Hamm noted, found it boring or too serious. He also found its effect at transmitting antisemitic beliefs to be insignificant.

The program was central to Metzger's media strategy, and he used the program to position himself as a national leader of the white supremacist movement. It was influential on white supremacists, far-right survivalists, and increased Metzger's profile among the far right and with mainstream media figures; he soon guest starred on mainstream talk shows like Geraldo and The Oprah Winfrey Show. Jeffrey Kaplan called the program "the crown jewel in WAR's media arsenal", writing that it "allows well-known racist figures and lesser-known skinheads to get their 15 minutes of fame by speaking to an audience of true believers, antiracist watchdogs, and channel-surfing insomniacs around the nation." Most far-right media was heavily regional; in contrast, Metzger had "catapulted himself into the American living room".

Elinor Langer, author of a biography of Metzger, described Race and Reason as an "extraordinary political creation", enabling Metzger to increase his profile and influence on the white supremacist movement. She wrote in 2003 that "that a man with Tom Metzger's lifelong involvement with television should have seen the possibilities for the racist movement in public access TV seems natural enough after the fact, but it was quite a feat of imagination when it happened"; she called the program clumsy, yet influential on the far right movement. James Coates wrote in 1987 that the show was an aspect of how "Metzger became something of a mastermind in the Survival Right's efforts to exploit relatively commonplace but newly emerging technologies as part of its political organizing."

== List of interviews ==
Subject	Host	Date taped	Details	Ref.
Odinists (including Baxter the Pagan, Monique Wolfing)	Tom Metzger/David Wiley	1984	The debut episode. David Wiley as co-host. Metzger interviews several Odinists, including Baxter the Pagan, an Odinist member of WAR, and his wife Monique Wolfing, head of the Aryan Women's League.	
Greg Withrow	Tom Metzger/David Wiley	1984	One of the first six episodes. David Wiley as co-host. Withrow was the head of the White Student Union. During the show, Withrow complimented a white student who murdered a Vietnamese man.	
David McCalden	Tom Metzger/David Wiley	1984	One of the first six episodes. David Wiley as co-host. McCalden was the leader of the Holocaust denial organization Truth Missions, a split from the Institute for Historical Review.	
Frank Silva	Tom Metzger/David Wiley	1984	One of the first six episodes. David Wiley as co-host. Silva was a Ku Klux Klan leader.	
Robert E. Miles	Tom Metzger/David Wiley	1984	One of the first six episodes. David Wiley as co-host. Miles was a white supremacist religious leader, the leader of Mountain Churches of Michigan.	
Ben Klassen	Tom Metzger	1984-12	Klassen was the founder of the white supremacist religious movement Creativity.	
Mike Brown	Tom Metzger	?	Brown was the bodyguard of neo-Nazi leader George Lincoln Rockwell.	
Karl Hand	Tom Metzger	1985-04-10	Hand was a neo-Nazi, and then the leader of the National Socialist Liberation Front. During his appearance, he praised Adolf Hitler.	
Richard Barrett	Roy Frankhouser	1986	One of a few episodes not hosted by Metzger, but by Roy Frankhouser; Frankhouser interviewed Richard Barrett, a pro-segregation lawyer.	
Richard Girnt Butler	Tom Metzger	?	Butler was the leader of the Aryan Nations.	
Ed Fields	Tom Metzger	1986	Ed Fields was the editor of The Truth at Last newspaper.	
Boyd Rice	Tom Metzger	1986-12-30	Boyd Rice is an American industrial musician. During the interview Metzger and Boyd Rice discuss Mein Kampf, electronic music, among other topics.	
David Mazzella	Tom Metzger	1987	Mazzella was a Metzger associate.	
J. B. Stoner	Tom Metzger	1987	Stoner was the leader of the National States' Rights Party. This episode was noted as "particularly outragous" by Robert D. Purvis. The show's funder, Alexander Foxe, voluntarily pulled this tape from a distributor to quiet the controversy.	
Herbert Poinsett	Tom Metzger	1988 or prior		
John Jewell	Tom Metzger	1988?	Jewell was a WAR staff writer and a former leftist.	
Radio Werewolf (Nikolas Schreck)	Tom Metzger	1988	Radio Werewolf is a music act that used Nazi theming.	
Carl Straight	Tom Metzger	1988	Straight was a reporter for Race and Reason. While appearing on the show, he wore a shirt that read "White Revolution is the Only Solution".	
Wyatt Kaldenberg	Tom Metzger	1989	WAR managing editor. Aired in November 1989	
Wally George	Tom Metzger	?	George was an American conservative television host.	
James Mason	Tom Metzger	1993-07-13	Interview split into 3 episodes. Mason is a neo-Nazi writer and the author of the neo-Nazi essay collection Siege, which was heavily promoted by Metzger.	
Bob Heick	Tom Metzger	?	Leader of the American Front	
Ernst Zündel	Tom Metzger	?	German neo-Nazi and Holocaust denier	
Kirk Lyons	Tom Metzger	?	Far-right attorney	
