= Hate on Trial =

1993 book by Morris Dees and Steve Fiffer

- First edition cover
- Author: Morris Dees and Steve Fiffer
- Language: English
- Subject: Trial against Tom Metzger
- Publisher: Villard
- Publication date: February 1993
- Media type: Print (hardcover)
- Pages: 280
- ISBN: 0-679-40614-X
- OCLC: 27188030
- Dewey Decimal: 364.1 20
- LC Class: KF228.M48 D44 1993

Hate on Trial: The Case Against America's Most Dangerous Neo-Nazi is a book by attorneys Morris Dees and Steve Fiffer. The book was published by the imprint Villard, an imprint of Random House, in February 1993. It recounts the civil trial of Berhanu v. Metzger in which the Southern Poverty Law Center and Anti-Defamation League sued Tom Metzger and White Aryan Resistance for being responsible for instigating the 1988 murder of Mulugeta Seraw. Hate on Trial received mixed reviews, with praise for its writing but criticism for being too close to the case or self-serving.

== Background ==
Morris Dees is an attorney and the co founder of the Southern Poverty Law Center, a civil rights group which used civil suits to take action against racist groups. He had previously collaborated with coauthor and attorney Steve Fiffer on a similar book, A Season for Justice, in 1991 about a similar case where they had bankrupted a branch of the Ku Klux Klan. The case against Tom Metzger and White Aryan Resistance came after the murder of Mulugeta Seraw in 1988, which Dees utilized in a similar manner. Metzger was, prior to the case, one of the most prominent white supremacists in America.

The book was published by the imprint Villard, an imprint of Random House, in February 1993. Its first edition was 288 pages.

== Contents ==
The books contains black and white photos. The authors recount the civil trial of Berhanu v. Metzger in which the Southern Poverty Law Center and Anti-Defamation League sued Tom Metzger and White Aryan Resistance. After Seraw's 1988 murder by Skinheads in Portland, Dees became convinced that Metzger had instigated the violence leading up to it. He pursued the case, leading to a years-long legal battle. Dees presents skinhead violence as a present and rising threat. The trial takes up more than half of the book.

Metzger represented himself; during the trial, he objected to the judge because his name "sounded Jewish", resulting in a switch to a judge who was black. Dees found a member of WAR, Dave Mazzella who testified that Metzger had encouraged the violence that led to Seraw's murder, which made him liable under Oregon law. The case was controversial because at times Metzger was seen as compelling by the courts in his presentation of a free-speech based defense, and Mazzella, the key witness, was erratic and embroiled in separate legal struggles throughout the trial. Ultimately, the SPLC and ADL successfully argued that Meztger's organization was civilly liable for the murder of Seraw, and received a $12.5 million judgement.

== Reception ==
Jason Berry for The New York Times gave a mixed review, praising the descriptions and saying "a moral quest fuels this book with driving power", but criticized its silence on the topic of the media's feeding of hate groups and said it portrayed a "lopsided legal conflict" which was bereft of dramatic tension. Publishers Weekly called it a "brisk, lucid, dramatic" depiction of the suit but also "self-serving". They did say that "the authors responsibly address the free speech concerns the case raised". Kirkus Reviews called it "exciting" and "a gripping courtroom confrontation between hatred and righteousness". Timothy Christenfeld for Library Journal gave a mixed review. He called the first half of the book full of "annoying hokum" and said it would have been better told by an outsider who was less certain in the "correctness of Dees's methods and more sensitive to legal niceties and controversies", though said it had a better tone towards the end and it was revealing in its details about the trial.
