= WAR (newspaper) =

American neo-Nazi newspaper

- The Newspaper of the International White Racist
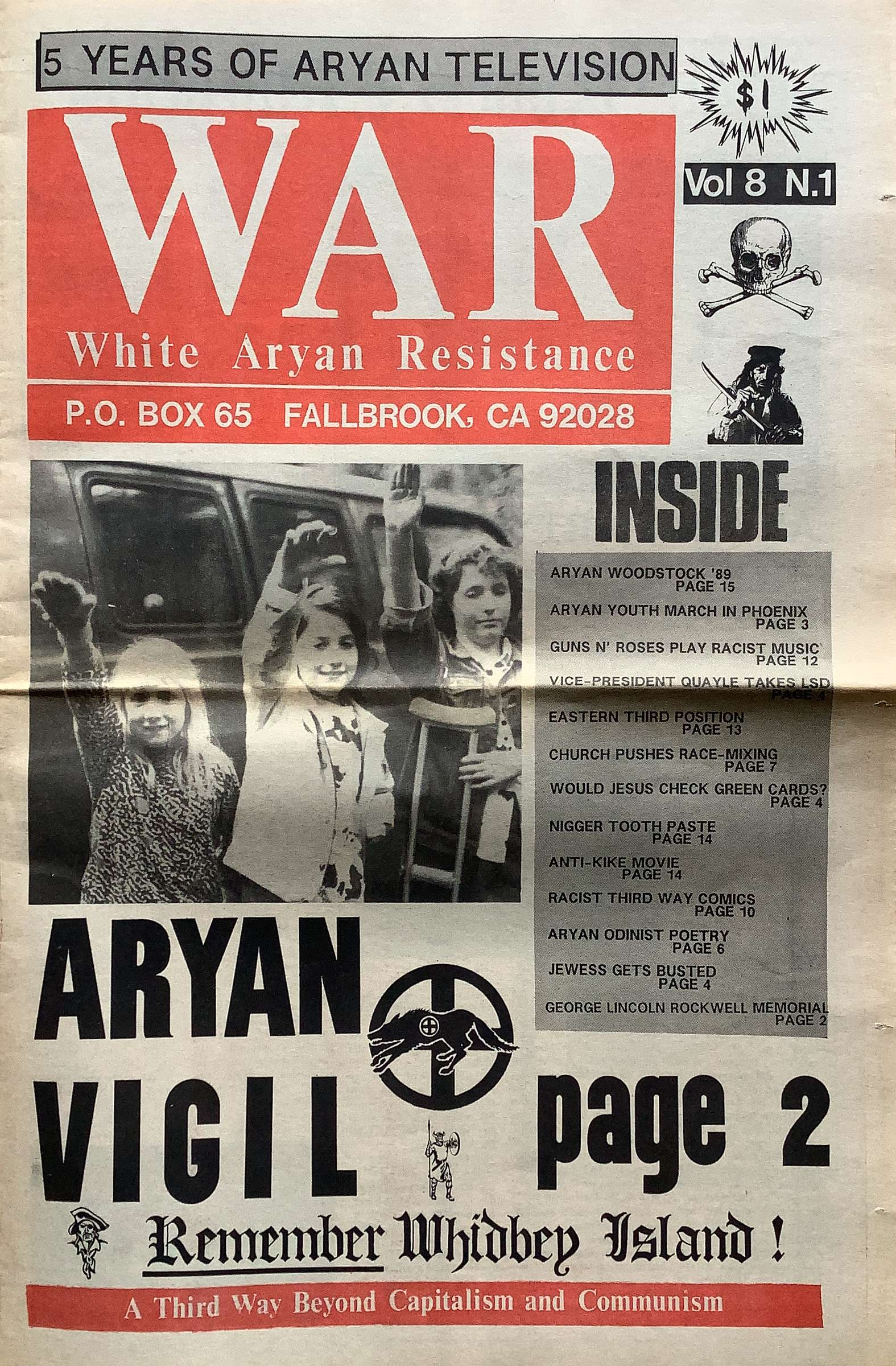
- First page of the first 1989 issue
- Type: Bimonthly newspaper
- Format: Tabloid
- Founder: Tom Metzger
- Publisher: White Aryan Resistance
- Editor: Tom Metzger
- Managing editor: Wyatt Kaldenberg
- Founded: 1983
- Ceased publication: 2006
- Political alignment: Neo-Nazism
- Language: English
- City: Fallbrook, California
- Country: United States
- OCLC number: 13831658

WAR (standing initially for White American Resistance, then later White Aryan Resistance) was an American neo-Nazi tabloid newspaper published by Tom Metzger's eponymous White Aryan Resistance (WAR) organization. It was published bimonthly, later monthly, out of Fallbrook, California. Self-described as "The Newspaper of the International White Racist" and later "the most racist newspaper on Earth", it was known for its sensational and frequently violent message. It appealed to, and was primarily read by, white supremacist skinheads.

It was established by Metzger in 1983 as the official publication of WAR. Even for a neo-Nazi periodical, WAR has been regarded by scholars as exceptionally extreme in its rhetoric and ideology, openly advocating race war and lauding perpetrators of racially motivated violence. It was styled as a tabloid and included numerous cartoons. It advocated the Third Position and racist environmentalism. WAR was renamed The Insurgent in the 2000s, afterwards being brought online and eventually discontinued by about 2006.

The paper contained editorials, merchandise sales offerings, and promotions of white supremacist music acts, particularly the British white power band Skrewdriver. Metzger's public-access television show Race and Reason had its distribution coordinated through the newspaper. White supremacist paraphernalia was sold through the newspaper. Contributors to WAR included Metzger himself, his wife, and various members of WAR. Its managing editor was Wyatt Kaldenberg, who wrote articles promoting Odinism. James Mason, the author of the neo-Nazi book Siege, also wrote for the periodical.

The paper was influential on the white supremacist scene, particularly known for its white supremacist cartoons. The cartoonist Nick Bougas created numerous cartoons in the periodical under the pseudonym "A. Wyatt Mann". These cartoons included antisemitic and anti-black caricatures, including the notable antisemitic caricature the Happy Merchant. These cartoons were popular with white supremacists of the era and continued to be used by the alt-right.

== Background ==
The founder of the newspaper, Tom Metzger, was an American white supremacist and neo-Nazi activist. In his professional life he was a television repairman by trade. Previously a Grand Dragon of David Duke's Knights of the Ku Klux Klan in California, he left Duke's group in 1979 and founded his own California-based Klan organization. The next year, Metzger ran for a house district seat, achieving surprising success in the Democratic primary before losing in the general election. The same year he renamed his Klan group the White American Political Association (WAPA) in order to distance them from the Klan.

WAPA's name was changed in April 1983 to White American Resistance (WAR), then to White Aryan Resistance in September 1984. Their newspaper was part of Metzger's wider efforts to spread his ideology through the media; to the same end, he subsequently created a public-access television show, Race and Reason. Metzger complemented the paper with several other media efforts, including a telephone hotline and later a website. He primarily sought to recruit white supremacist skinheads to WAR, seeing them as preferable to conservatives. In the 1980s and 1990s, Metzger frequently received attention from the mainstream media, making appearances on mainstream talk shows.

== History ==
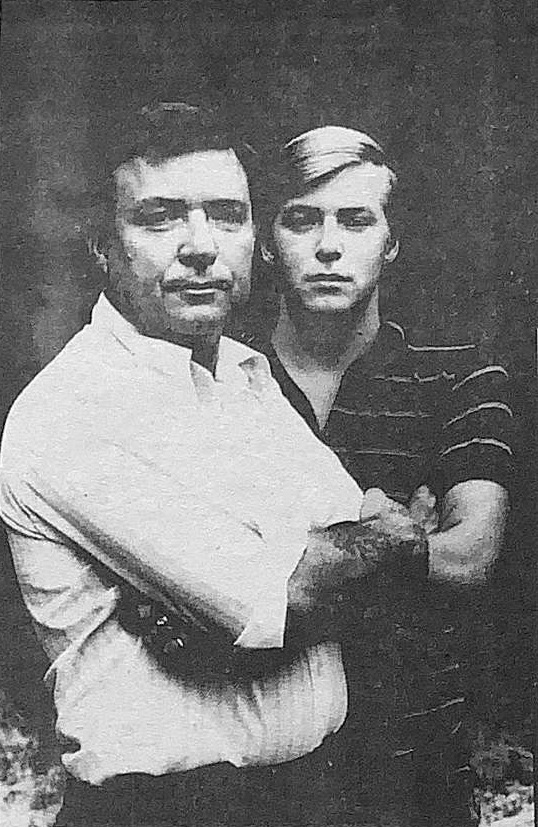
Tom Metzger, who operated the WAR newspaper, with his son John in 1986

WAR was established in 1983 as the official publication of the White American Political Association (shortly after changed to the White American Resistance). When the group's name was changed to White Aryan Resistance, the newspaper did not initially follow and kept being published under the name White American Resistance. It was later also changed to stand for White Aryan Resistance.

The paper's circulation continued to increase from 1985 to 1987. In 1986, James Mason's neo-Nazi newsletter Siege (later collected into a book of the same name) ceased its publication. Metzger, a reader of that periodical and one of the few people in the neo-Nazi movement who continued to platform Mason, disliked this news. In response, he asked Mason to write a column for WAR, to which Mason agreed. In 1989, the newspaper's layout was redesigned, becoming more professional in style and expanding many of its sections.

In 1988, Metzger's followers murdered an Ethiopian immigrant, Mulugeta Seraw, in Portland, Oregon. The Southern Poverty Law Center (SPLC) and Morris Dees, acting on Mulugeta's family's behalf, filed a civil suit against Metzger and WAR in the aftermath. They won and received a judgment of $12.5 million from Metzger, his son John, WAR, and his associates, bankrupting Metzger and the organization. The SPLC seized Metzger's assets, including their printing presses, online media, telephone lines, and mail-order marketing program. Nevertheless, the WAR newspaper continued, as did Race and Reason, and Metzger continued to promote white extremism. The fact that Metzger and his media outlets continued to be in operation despite going bankrupt and losing a $12.5 million civil suit was seen as suspicious by other white supremacists.

Several years after the civil suit, other white supremacists accused Metzger of secretly cooperating with the SPLC in exchange for the ability to continue to operate. Ed Fields wrote as such in his newspaper The Truth at Last, claiming that "if [supporters] want their letters to reach Metzger faster, they should write directly to Tom Metzger c/o Morris Dees". Harold Covington, a fellow neo-Nazi, was a chief voice of these allegations. He alleged in a 1995 article titled "Morris Dees is the De Facto Publisher of Metzger's WAR" that Metzger had cut a deal with the SPLC, allowing their agent to intercept all letters and money sent to him, but allowing him to keep half of the profits so he could stay in operation. Metzger responded with outrage to these claims, but according to scholar Jeffrey Kaplan, "was never able to fully deny the charges". According to Kaplan, others concluded that the SPLC did control Metzger's P.O. box for a period of time following the lawsuit (though were uncertain if this continued to be the case) but also claimed that other aspects of the allegations were false.

In a 1991 episode of CNBC's Talk Live guest-hosted by Christopher Hitchens, Metzger and his son John were questioned over a comic in the newspaper that celebrated the assassination of Martin Luther King Jr., and asked if they were serious about the violence they promoted. In response, John Metzger described the newspaper and promoted it to the audience.

The newspaper continued into the 2000s, later renamed to (or replaced by) The Insurgent. This newspaper maintained an avowedly racist ideology. It was published quarterly and later brought online, then ceased by about 2006. He continued to operate a website of the same name, The Insurgent, that served as a general portal for racist information online. Metzger died in 2020.

== Contents and profile ==
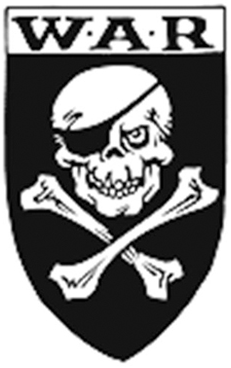
Logo of the WAR organization which appeared in the newspaper

WAR was issued bimonthly, later monthly except for January, in tabloid format and style, modeled off of publications like the New York Post. It has also been described as a zine, and as an underground newspaper. It was published by Metzger out of Fallbrook, California. He also edited the newspaper. The paper was sensational in tone, and stories frequently lacked bylines. Christine Cafarella for the magazine Orange Coast described its content in 1987 as "crudely designed", with its stories often being poorly written. The newspaper's visual style was improved in 1989, taking on a more stylized and professional look, with higher quality photographs and full length features on white supremacist topics. Criminologist Mark S. Hamm called its post-1989 iteration a "model of vibrant and electric presentations of a particular point of view".

Most issues contained an editorial from Metzger, followed by letters to the editor, selections from other appearances by Metzger, articles from WAR associates, cartoons, and merchandise sales. WAR promoted white supremacist music acts, particularly the British white power band Skrewdriver, with a section devoted to the band and Ian Stuart. Reviews of such music were also included. White supremacist paraphernalia was sold through the newspaper in an "Aryan Entertainment" section, including tapes from Metzger and Race and Reason, racist videos, books, and cassettes, as well as stickers, posters, jewelry, and t-shirts. It also had a mailing list of skinhead organizations in the United States. Issues contained a list of platform statements by Metzger writing about WAR's stance on various issues. Essays on ideology as well as fictional accounts giving guides on revolution also appeared.

Metzger coordinated the distribution of his public-access television program Race and Reason through the newspaper, requesting that his readers help him distribute the program. It also listed cable systems that carried Race and Reason. Contents of the program were generally tamer than the newspaper. WAR frequently republished and clipped stories from other newspapers, particularly ones that covered WAR and the various free speech controversies associated with their television program. The newspaper was distributed to neighborhoods that WAR believed may have people who sympathized with their goals, with WAR members dropping the paper on California lawns alongside other WAR materials. This resulted in media attention. It was also distributed to high school students in WAR's recruitment efforts. While primarily serious in nature (outside of the comics), the paper also included racist jokes on occasion. It had a section parodying the Southern Poverty Law Center's Klanwatch, titled "Kikewatch".

Jeffrey Kaplan described the newspaper as continuing the WAR organization's emphasis of "primitive emotional appeals that are the racialist movement’s lowest common denominator." Metzger frequently devoted articles to discussing and praising The Order, a neo-Nazi militant group that, at the time, was being hunted down by the federal government for several violent crimes, as their case developed. He later created a feature section on "Prisoners of War", how he described imprisoned white supremacists, listing them and featuring their prison addresses so readers could support them and their families. Metzger described them as "Prisoners of War" of the "Zionist Occupation Government". "Prisoners of War" listed in the newspaper included members of The Order, Karl Hand (the leader of the National Socialist Liberation Front), James Earl Ray, and Manfred Roeder.

=== Ideology ===
Even for a neo-Nazi periodical, WAR is regarded by scholars and observers as exceptionally extreme and straightforward in its rhetoric; it openly advocated race war and violent revolution. The newspaper's motto was "The Newspaper of the International White Racist", and later "the most racist newspaper on Earth". The paper was designed to appeal to skinheads and influence them towards a more ideological kind of white supremacy. Raúl Pérez noted its primary message to readers as being that white men were under attack and needed to "fight back".

Swedish religious historian Mattias Gardell described it as "aggressively racist", George Michael wrote that it was "one of the most provocative underground publications in the movement", while Jeffrey Kaplan said it "interspers[ed] occasional literate expositions with repellent racist cartoons and inarticulate anger." Stephen E. Atkins noted it in 2002 as the "most racist of the extremist publications". Cafarella described it as putting "into print the points of view of various contributing white supremacists who enjoy taking potshots at blacks, Jews, Mexicans, Asians, and corporate white America". It frequently vilified racial minorities and LGBTQ people and used a variety of slurs in referring to them. Scholars of extremism John George and Laird Wilcox said of WAR that:

In its pages Metzger and other writers engage in some of the most outspoken and vehement racist and anti-Jewish rhetoric in the neo-Nazi movement. There are no subtleties or nuances. Metzger's views are right up front.

The newspaper and WAR advocated the Third Position, a type of neo-fascist ideology that adopts left-wing elements, attracting some economically left-wing individuals. Hamm listed it alongside David Duke's NAAWP News as "underground publications promoting grand theories of militarism and white working-class revolt". It promoted environmentalism from a white supremacist point of view. Articles at times advocated the leaderless resistance approach and right-wing terrorism. Gardell described it as part of a current of white supremacy that was apathetic about or even against Holocaust denial; he noted a 1994 WAR editorial that said, about Holocaust denialism, that "no sensible person would be excited about anything this dated" and called it "irrelevant", "rehashed", and a distraction from the "real struggle". Headlines from the year 1998 included: "More on Polygamy for Aryans", "The Niggerization of America", and "Sage Quotes for White Survival".

Members of white supremacist groups that committed violence like The Order were valorized, as were other perpetrators of racist violence and skinhead murderers. Nazis Rudolf Hess and Adolf Hitler were praised. It was known for its explicit, frequent advocacy and praising of racial violence; however, Elliott Oring argued that, in contrast to the paper's open "animosity toward Jews, blacks, Mexicans, Asians, and homosexuals" it "does not openly advocate specific acts of violence to achieve its aims. When violence is recommended, it tends to be abstract, generalized, deferred, or indirect", promoted as an "abstract ideological principle". He speculated this was primarily due to legal concerns. Metzger's various feuds with other white supremacist figures, including his long term enemies David Duke and Willis Carto, were expressed in the periodical.

=== Contributors ===
In addition to Metzger himself, contributors to WAR included a variety of WAR members and Metzger's wife. Associates of WAR and members of other organizations also contributed articles; many articles were written anonymously. Wyatt Kaldenberg, previously the publisher of a white supremacist Trotskyist newsletter, was managing editor. His articles promoted white supremacist paganism or Odinism. Nicholas Goodrick-Clarke described Kaldenberg's articles for the newspaper as "spew[ing] a stream of abusive misanthropy and violent rhetoric to promote a white revolution". His articles provoked criticism from Christian Identity adherents.

John Jewell, a former member of the Industrial Workers of the World labor union, was a staff writer. Even after Jewell's shift to white supremacist politics, he continued his focus on labor politics; his writing for WAR focused on labor politics and Russia, but also music. The writings of the imprisoned neo-Nazis featured in the POW section from prison were also included, such as Karl Hand. Members of the Aryan Women's League, a women's organization and offshoot of WAR, wrote for the newspaper. Albion Wolf and Lisa Turner, a member of the World Church of the Creator, were also contributors.

James Mason, the author of the neo-Nazi newsletter and later the book Siege, also wrote for WAR. Mason wrote occasionally for the newspaper from the end of his newsletter in 1986 to 1993, but after he was imprisoned in the mid-1990s, his output in the paper greatly increased. Mason stopped writing for WAR after his writings took an increasingly Christian bent, Metzger being an atheist (though they remained friends). Mason's writings for the paper were later collected into an anthology titled Articles of WAR in 2002. The paper also reprinted art made by counterculture publisher Adam Parfrey (without crediting him).

=== Cartoons ===
The "Happy Merchant" caricature, one of the cartoons which first appeared in this newspaper

WAR was also known for its white supremacist cartoons, with a focus on humor. The paper contained hundreds of cartoons over its run, with each issue containing multiple comic strips and illustrations. The primary series of cartoons in the newspaper was made by Nick Bougas, who created a series of notorious antisemitic and racist cartoons for the newspaper, signing them with the pseudonym "A. Wyatt Mann" (A White Man). Bougas contributed cartoons from the late 1980s to the 1990s. He began contributing in 1989; by the second issue he contributed to, a whole page was devoted to his cartoons, asking the reader to "Post 'em ... Copy 'em ... Color 'em ... Spread 'em around!". Bougas's cartoons were later collected into booklets which were sold through the newspaper. Bougas's authorship was only publicly confirmed in 2015.

Criminologist Mark S. Hamm described WAR's comic operations as "highly sophisticated", comparing them to the works of Robert Crumb. He described them as "extravagant" and "grotesque", with frequent usage of slurs; he called them the paper's most defining feature. The Anti-Defamation League (ADL) wrote that these cartoons "most expressively represent Metzger's views", and that they featured "grotesque caricatures", while the Southern Poverty Law Center described them as "scurrilous and crudely drawn" as well as "vulgar". Uffa Jensen wrote that "all of the images published in WAR are deeply disturbing, radically racist or antisemitic", but that Bougas's were "the most aggressive and derogative".

Comics in WAR were frequently focused on denigrating black men, Jews, gay people, and Hispanics, and contained "blatant negative stereotypes". Black men were portrayed as idiotic and violent, drawn like apes, while Jews were portrayed with stereotypically large noses and portrayed as greedy and as manipulating society to destroy the white race. Cartoons featuring white men were frequently self-deprecating, portraying them as weak and subjugated by non-whites. Sociologist Raúl Pérez wrote that these were "used to provoke a sense of shame and humiliation suffered by white men and were intended to echo white supremacist fears and conspiracy theories of the supposed criminalization of whiteness". He compared the humor in WAR's comics to that of blackface minstrel shows. Elliott Oring, analyzing the paper's use of humor in its comics, found most of it to be based in caricature, exaggeration, puns, and incongruity. He wrote that other comics were less humorous and portrayed a straightforwardly serious message about racial violence.

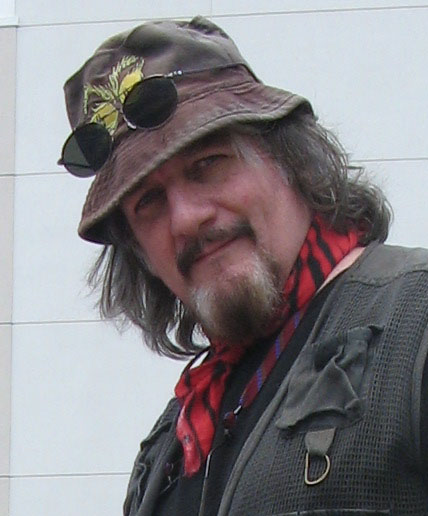
Nick Bougas, one of the cartoonists for WAR as "A. Wyatt Mann", pictured in 2008

They frequently commented on current events, like the 1992 Los Angeles riots and the Rodney King beating. The appearances of the cartoons in the paper were not connected to the textual contents of the articles they appeared alongside. Scholar Raúl Pérez argued that these cartoons displayed Metzger's "distinct brand of in-your-face and irreverent racism and far-right propaganda". The ADL noted several comic captions as conveying the general tone:

Jews ... they fret ... they panic ... they brood. ... They feverishly examine their stool and look under the bed for Nazis. ... They harbor perverse desires and foster chaos. ... They fear and hate everything and everyone ... even themselves. Avoid the neurotic, self-loathing Jew at all costs.

Ever notice how niggers are always loaded down with tons of beepers and cell phones ... Why would a race that can't speak anything but unintelligible gibberish be so obsessed with communication devices?

Who but the shameless, scurvy Jews could open a chain of exhibits coast to coast which showcase the misery and grisly death of "beloved family members" ... actually pimping the pain of their ancestors for a hefty admission fee!

Metzger said that the humor was used to lead readers to the more substantially ideological articles in WAR, and wrote that "nothing that WAR prints inflames our critics like these cartoons." One comic celebrated the assassination of Martin Luther King Jr. while another's caption proclaimed that O. J. Simpson was framed, both the subject and servant of "the international Jew conspiracy". These cartoons were later digitized on the website of the WAR organization. The A. Wyatt Mann cartoons included the creation of the notable antisemitic caricature the Happy Merchant, which features a stereotypically drawn Jewish man rubbing his hands.

== Influence and legacy ==
The newspaper was popular with white supremacist skinheads, with a predominantly male readership. In 1984, it had a circulation of 4,000. Circulation increased throughout the 1980s, and in 1987, Metzger claimed a circulation of 10,000. In 1999, the Southern Poverty Law Center listed it among "the most widely read, influential" periodicals in the far-right movement. They described it as a key element of Metzger's media strategy in organizing skinheads.

Scholar Mark S. Hamm described the paper as containing Metzger's "quintessential message of hate", and as the most influential radical neo-Nazi publication in the United States in the 1990s. In a study of the paper's effect on skinheads, Hamm argued that the paper succeeded in "entrench[ing] neo-Nazism in the minds of youth", and described readership of the periodical as correlative of violence. He said it was a major source in transmitting neo-Nazi beliefs about racial minorities and LGBT people to its readership, though said it appeared to be ineffective at transmitting antisemitism.

Its cartoons and humor were a large aspect of its influence and were popular among white supremacists. They drew WAR much attention; sociologist Raúl Pérez said in 2022 that the paper's "steady stream of racist cartoons [...] offered a parallel assault to political correctness, colorblindness, and civil rights with a kind of racism that appealed to the irreverent sensibilities of a disaffected and alienated white working-class male youth coming of age in a post–civil rights America." He credited it with "animating the emerging notions of 'reverse racism'".

Pérez further argued that the cartoons were a "powerful example of the way that amused racial contempt was weaponized by the far right during the early part of the so-called colorblind era", and noted that it "promoted white supremacist racial violence in a way that liberal and moderate journalists and critics could easily disregard as 'unserious,' as 'just a joke'". Spencer Sunshine described the A. Wyatt Mann cartoons that appeared in the paper as "iconic in the White Supremacist milieu" of the time. The cartoons were later rediscovered and used by the alt-right movement. One such cartoon first published in WAR, the Happy Merchant caricature, became widely used among the alt-right in later decades and among white supremacists online.
