= Happy Merchant =

Antisemitic caricature

- The caricature, cropped from its original appearance
- First appearance: WAR Vol #11, no. #5; 1992
- Created by: Nick Bougas (A. Wyatt Mann)

The Happy Merchant (also called le happy merchant, Jew face, Merchant face, or Jew-bwa-ha-ha.gif) is an antisemitic caricature of a Jewish man. The image appears commonly online, where it is frequently used in antisemitic contexts. It was created by the American artist and filmmaker Nick Bougas in 1992, first appearing in an issue of Tom Metzger's white supremacist WAR newspaper, where it appeared alongside an anti-black drawing. It was one of many cartoons Bougas illustrated for the publication, which were issued under the pseudonym "A. Wyatt Mann". It is frequently edited and repurposed into various different iterations.

== History ==
The image was first created by "A. Wyatt Mann" (a word play on "A white man"), a pseudonym of Nick Bougas, an American filmmaker and cartoonist. Under his own name he drew for Jim Goad's magazine Answer Me!, among other publications. It was one of numerous cartoons that Bougas, under that pseudonym, created for the white supremacist newspaper WAR from 1989 on, The newspaper was operated by Tom Metzger, and self-described as the "most racist newspaper on Earth". The cartoons were part of a broad usage of different media formats by Metzger in order to promote white supremacy.

The cartoon was first released in print in 1992 in WAR volume 11, issue 5, on page 7. It was part of a cartoon that also included a racist caricature of a black man and used these images to say: "Let's face it! A world without Jews and Blacks would be like a world without rats and cockroaches." The anti-black part of the image was cropped out in later depictions. After its appearance in the paper, Metzger began selling Bougas's cartoons in collected booklets through the paper; one such advertisement in 2001 contained the Happy Merchant image by itself.

The image had appeared online by February 2001. The stereotypical image of a Jew from the cartoon began to spread on various internet communities, where users began to make variations of it. After it emerged online, its origins became confused for many years. That Bougas was the person behind the A. Wyatt Mann pseudonym had been suspected for years, but was only confirmed in 2015.

== Description ==
The caricature is variously known as "le happy merchant", Jew-bwa-ha-ha.gif, Jew face, Merchant face, or the Happy Merchant. It was primarily known as "Jew-bwa-ha-ha.gif" for a time; the "Happy Merchant" name appeared later, by 2012.

The image features a stereotypically drawn Jewish man, pictured smiling and rubbing his hands together. The image is intended as a derogatory depiction, and employs many stereotypes of Jews. These include:

- A large, hook-shaped nose ("Jewish nose")
- A kippah (Jewish head garment)
- A malevolent smile, with a slightly hunched back and hands being rubbed together, to indicate greed or scheming

== Analysis ==
Judith Cohen of the United States Holocaust Memorial Museum argued that it bore the influence of antisemitic Nazi Party propagandist and cartoonist for Der Stürmer, Philipp Rupprecht. A 2020 scholarly analysis compared it to Nazi propaganda, and wrote that it was "archetypal of the way in which the alt-right has adopted centuries old antisemitic tropes and sought to reinvent them for a new generation". The Southern Poverty Law Center wrote that it "harkens back to the propaganda of Nazi Germany".

Scholar Uffa Jensen considered parts of its popularity to derive from its "aggressive nature". Jensen found that the image "establish[ed] the figure as alien in his religious, behavioural and physiognomic traits". She found it significant that the picture became popular in its cropped form, without the anti-black stereotype included. Journalist Joseph Bernstein found it most disturbing in its "sheer ubiquity". It is considered a hate symbol by the Anti-Defamation League (ADL). Activist Dave Rich argued it bore a resemblance to Fagin from Oliver Twist.

== Use ==
This image is a form of antisemitic propaganda, common internet communities such as 4chan, other anonymous image board websites, and on other message boards. It is popular internationally, and is frequently edited and repurposed into a variety of antisemitic contexts. It was for a time primarily used as a reaction image, then expanded beyond this usage. It was popular among the alt-right. The Southern Poverty Law Center wrote that, as of 2018, it frequently appeared on r/The_Donald. The image prominently appears in Ethnic Cleansing, a white supremacist video game released in 2002.

Scholar Uffa Jensen identified it as a "prominent example of visual antisemitism in online communication" and as "one of the most influential hate pictures in the digital age". A 2015 article from journalist Joseph Bernstein described it as "unquestionably the most popular anti-Semitic image on the internet", and further, possibly "the most widely seen anti-Semitic image in history". The ADL considers it "by far the most popular antisemitic meme among white supremacist", subject to "endless variations". Dave Rich recalls seeing the image 'stuck to lamp posts and bollards' in Jewish areas of London in 2021, around the 20th anniversary of the September 11 attacks, alongside images blaming Israel for the attacks.

In 2017, Al Jazeera appeared to have tweeted an image of the Happy Merchant on its official English-language Twitter account while referring to climate change deniers. Al Jazeera explained in an apology that they did not post the image in question, but replied to a user who did and then linked to the thread by accident. In 2020, NAACP of Philadelphia head Rodney Muhammad posted an image of it on his Facebook, which he removed after backlash, claiming he "wasn't familiar" with the caricature. In 2022, an alcohol advertisement for Arbol Verde in the Chilean newspaper Las Últimas Noticias included the meme, resulting in criticism from Jewish communities.

A 2018 study published by Savvas Zannettou et al. focused on online antisemitism recorded that the Happy Merchant and its variations were "among the most popular memes on both 4chan's /pol/ board and Gab, two major outlets for alt-right expression. The study found that usage of the Happy Merchant on /pol/ remained largely consistent (with a peak during the United States missile strike on Syria in April 2017), while use of the meme on Gab increased after the Unite the Right rally in the US in August 2017. It was also determined that /pol/ influenced the spread of the Happy Merchant to other web platforms such as Twitter and Reddit. The same study also found that the Happy Merchant has been incorporated into other common memes on the site, including Pepe the Frog, an originally apolitical caricature of a frog, which is often used by the alt-right for racist purposes.

== See also ==
- Triple parentheses – Antisemitic symbol
- The Eternal Jew – 1940 German antisemitic propaganda film
