= American Front =

Nationalist white-supremacy group

- Founded: 1984
- Ideology: White supremacy

Party flag

American Front (AF) is a white supremacist organization founded in San Francisco, California by Bob Heick in 1984. It began as a loose organization modeled after the British National Front. Heick began working with Tom Metzger's White Aryan Resistance (WAR) in 1988.

== History ==
In 1985 Bob Heick began writing and distributing leaflets, mostly from a nationalist anti-communist stance, in response to the increasing leftist influence in the local punk subculture. Originally intended as an umbrella organization for all American skinheads, AF had no formal structure or membership. In San Francisco, Heick lost favor with the mostly apolitical skinheads. Media attention and constant vandalism and assault (such as breaking the windows of the Bound Together anarchist bookstore and harassing interracial couples in the Haight-Ashbury) by the group brought increased attention from the local police. In addition, Heick's progression from patriotism to Nazism lost him many friends, and some people accused him of trying to take over the local skinhead scene. Heick then started associating with heavy metal music fans and rural white workers. He formed the short-lived group United White Brethren in the North and South Bay Areas.

Upon his return to San Francisco in 1987, Heick found the newer generation of local skinheads to be more receptive to Nazism. The AF transformed into a political organization, and its membership was no longer exclusively skinheads. On the AF telephone hotline, at the end of the telephone message, Heick asked "Do you have hate in your heart?" The AF telephone hotline often repeated a quote from the San Francisco-born author Jack London: "I'm a worker, but first of all I'm a white worker". On May 1, 1988, AF held its first White Workers Day march on Haight Street in San Francisco, in which 65 participants, which included a few long haired white hippies who had spontaneously joined the march, marched unopposed. This was heralded by Tom Metzger of White Aryan Resistance on his telephone hotline, in the WAR newspaper, and on television. The AF tabloid Aryan Warrior was published soon after. Metzger began presenting Heick to the media as a spokesman for white power skinheads. Heick appeared on the TV news magazine The Reporters, in a segment that mainly focused on Heick and included footage of the Mayday march. AF was also featured in publications such as Rolling Stone, Hustler, and Sassy. By 1989, there were AF units in 14 American states.

=== Aryan Woodstock ===
Heick started to organize a concert of white power bands on rural land near Napa, California, a suburb of San Francisco in the northern part of the San Francisco Bay Area. Heick was pushed aside by Tom Metzger, and the concert became a White Aryan Resistance event instead of an AF event. Heick and Metzger disagreed on almost every facet of the festival, including the name, Aryan Woodstock. Heick disagreed with Metzger's promotion of the event on his phone hotline, because it was monitored by anti-racist activists, and would give them time to organize against the event. A WAR activist was told by three bureaucrats that no permit would be required to play live music at a private event on private land, as long as sanitation was provided for.

During the two weeks leading up to Aryan Woodstock, the event was a leading local news story. Napa County sought an injunction to block the gathering, and Heick appeared before a judge to defend AF and WAR's right to assemble. The judge ruled that the gathering may take place, but that there could be no music. Approximately 300 people from across the United States arrived on the property before the landowner allowed the authorities to close off the entrance. This stranded many would-be attendees. Several hundred protesters were outside the property. Tension between AF and WAR increased soon after. Heick spent the next year visiting various AF units in California and across the United States before getting married and settling down in Portland, Oregon.

=== 1990s ===
In 1990 Heick announced on the AF telephone hotline that the group would appear in San Francisco's Union Square on the first Saturday in May. The message ran for a month prior to the event. Opponents of the AF held a Mayday demonstration three days prior, on May 1. On the day of the AF event, Heick arrived with a small group of supporters and walked towards 300 debris-throwing protesters. Police moved in and encircled AF, separating the two groups. At this point, both the AF and SFPD were vastly outnumbered by counter protesters. Back-up officers began arriving on the scene and the police were able to get a patrol wagon into the park.

In October 1990 the Coalition for Human Dignity published fliers with Heick's new home address in Portland, Oregon, and distributed press releases announcing his arrival. Local TV news crews arrived at Heick's apartment a few days after he moved in. Heick still received regular invitations to appear on national television but many of the new offers were to appear on trash TV shows. He has appeared on the Geraldo Rivera Show. As press interest in Heick and AF waned, Heick focused on local activism. AF's 1991 May Day demonstration was held in Portland. There was a large counter protest, but no violence. In 1992, Heick and AF associates were the first out-of-state activists to arrive at the Randy Weaver stand-off at Ruby Ridge. Heick blockaded a fuel truck and lambasted the driver for supporting the government.

Around this time AF focused on demonstrations and literature distribution. The group's telephone hotline was revived in Portland and remained active until Heick left the group in 1995. In the 1990s, the Washington and California AF sections published The Voice of Revolution magazine, which had ties to Combat 18 in England. AF focused on opposing hate crime laws, which they claimed only targeted whites. AF became known for harassing Portland city commissioner Mike Lindberg, who called the group "gay bashing skinheads" in the press. The Albany, Oregon area AF unit held regular demonstrations. AF briefly resurfaced under the leadership of James Porrazzo, who moved the group to Harrison, Arkansas and began to promote Third Positionism.

=== 2000s ===
On March 4, 2011, AF leader David Lynch was shot and killed while at his home in Sacramento, California. His girlfriend (who was pregnant at the time of the attack) was injured but survived.

On May 5, 2012, ten members of the Florida branch of the American Front were arrested in St. Cloud, Florida, 25 miles (40 km) from the Walt Disney World theme parks, and charged with paramilitary training, shooting into an occupied dwelling and evidence of prejudices while committing an offense.

Marcus Faella, and an eventual total of thirteen of his American Front associates were arrested. On November 10, 2014, Faella was convicted for his part in attempting to incite a "race war" but was sentenced to only 6 months in jail. One commentator described the case against the American Front as "floundering", while the judge described the group as "the gang that couldn't shoot straight".

Marcus Faella obtained attorney Augustus Sol Invictus to appeal the case.
