= Greg Withrow =

- Born: May 1, 1961 (age 65)
- Education: American River College

Gregory Withrow (born May 1, 1961) is an American far-right White supremacy activist. He was described by the Chicago Sun-Times as being "widely acknowledged as the founder of the [white power] 'skinhead' movement in 1978". Withrow subsequently publicly abandoned his earlier political beliefs in the late 1980s and became a regular face on television speaking out against racism and the organisation of young people by the far-right. In later years Withrow repudiated his change of heart and returned to far-right activism.

== Early life ==
Withrow was the son of first cousins who married due to unplanned pregnancy. The marriage ended after three years and Withrow was raised by his father, Albert. Withrow stated that he came from a racist background and that his father made him read far-right literature and study the life of Adolf Hitler whilst growing up in Sacramento, California. He also claimed that his father had been violently abusive and that, amongst other incidents, had once armed the young Withrow with a knife before setting the family Bull Terrier on him and telling him to kill the dog or be killed. Withrow, however, subsequently claimed that he had exaggerated and invented much of the narrative of his childhood in order to receive sympathy.

== White supremacy ==
Withrow joined the Ku Klux Klan at the age of 14 and with his friends set up a gang that carried out a series of muggings against Japanese tourists and gay people. Withrow was quickly arrested however when one of his intended victims proved to be an undercover police officer.

In 1979, whilst in attendance at American River College, Withrow established the White Student Union as an attempt to increase white supremacist action among the student population. Withrow had become disillusioned with what he saw as the ineffectiveness of the Ku Klux Klan. He came to the attention of Tom Metzger and before long Withlow's group had formed a close link with the Aryan Youth Movement, the youth branch of Metzger's White Aryan Resistance. Under Metzger's direction Withlow became recognised as a rising star on the far-right and neo-Nazi scene in the US, with a series of speeches delivered at the Aryan Nations compound in Idaho attracting wide attention for the fiery nature of their rhetoric. He attracted further controversy at the 1986 Aryan World Congress by stating that non-Aryans in the USA should "be terminated or expelled".

Withrow claimed that he advocated a cell-based organization akin to leaderless resistance, albeit one that he personally called the "100 Hitlers policy", arguing that it allowed the movement to continue to function even when individual cells were brought down by law enforcement.

Withrow claimed that he renounced racism in 1987 due to the death of his father and the fact that he had fallen in love with a woman whose family had come to the United States as refugees from Nazi Germany.

== Departure ==
Withrow decided to quit the movement in 1987 after his father died and he fell in love with a woman whose family had fled Hitler's Germany. He stated that "I've said a lot of terrible things and I've spread a lot of harm; I don't want to hate anymore".

Soon after his departure from the far-right he claimed that he was attacked in a parking lot near a branch of K-Mart in Sacramento by a skinhead gang whose number included his former best friend. He claimed that his former friends captured him and tortured him to near death before he was able to escape. He had been nailed to a crossbeam and slashed with knives before being left for dead. However he regained consciousness and ran off, with the beam still nailed in place, and sought assistance from several passers-by before an African-American couple came to his aid.

== Media career ==
After details of the attack were disseminated Withrow became the centre of media attention. Now publicly declaring his support for anti-racism, Withrow became a mainstay on daytime television and tabloid talk shows, being interviewed by Oprah Winfrey, Phil Donahue and Montel Williams, as well as accepting speaking engagements for groups such as the Anti-Defamation League of B'nai B'rith. On one occasion he appeared alongside Tom Metzger's son John on The Phil Donahue Show and Withrow claimed that Metzger told him that he deserved to die for leaving the white supremacist movement. His autobiography, Child of the Fourth Reich, was released around this time and it was praised by Anti-Defamation League regional director Richard G. Hirschhaut as "a riveting account of one person's passage through the subterranean milieu of paranoia and hatred and his ultimate redemption through love". A movie version of the book was even mooted with Woody Harelson and Sean Penn, with both saying that they were interested in Withrow's life story.

Withrow also provided testimony to a number of government agencies and initiatives. On January 7, 1991, he addressed the Commission on the Prevention of Hate Violence after being invited to do so by Leo T. McCarthy, the then lieutenant governor of California. In December 1993 he provided testimony to the Committee on Judiciary of the California State Senate about his time on the far-right and his reasons as to why young men were attracted to membership in such groups. Withrow also married a Mexican American woman named Maria Rodriguez in 1994.

Film maker Elizabeth Thompson produced a documentary about Withrow entitled Blink. It focused on Withrow's conversion away from far-right activity and the alienation of young men that helped to drive them into groups such as those in which Withrow was involved. It was featured at the 2001 Human Rights Watch International Film Festival in Boston, MA. The documentary subsequently won an Emmy Award.

== Return ==
Withrow had settled in Butte County, where he picked up a string of arrests for minor offences including petty theft and vandalism, including a case where he was found mentally unfit to stand trial. Elizabeth Thompson also mentioned that she found Withrow to be a frightening personality, particularly after he reacted negatively to the way she had portrayed him in Blink.

Mike Ramsey, the Butte County District Attorney, felt that it was around the time of the release of Blink that Withrow began to move back to white supremacy, largely because the documentary presented him in a stark manner and led to a tailing off in interest from media outlets. Finally in May 2000, Withrow wrote a paper entitled "The Truth Hurts" and he sent copies of it to McCarthy, Governor Gray Davis, Lieutenant Governor Cruz Bustamante and Attorney General Bill Lockyer. In the paper he claimed that the incident in which his former allies had "crucified" him had been a hoax and that his testimonies about it had been perjured. He followed this in August 2001 by filing a lawsuit seeking to abolish all of California's hate crime laws and demanding a $1 million payment to any White person who had been convicted under existing legislation. His lawsuit included 68 pages of statements further repudiating his earlier anti-racist work and denouncing it as a hoax.

Withrow divorced Maria Rodriguez on May 6, 2000, after an altercation between the couple in which she attacked him with a baseball bat whilst he attacked her with a knife. He subsequently claimed that the marriage had been part of his plan, arguing that "the marriage got me into places that they otherwise wouldn't let me go. I had as much feelings for her as you do for undocumented workers; as much feelings for her as one would have for a dog, maybe less. More like feelings toward her as a slave".

Withrow argued that he was a "mole for the white Aryans, the cause of revolution" intent on infiltrating the Anti-Defamation League and he also claimed that whilst he was appearing on talk shows in order to condemn racism, he was also leading a gang that appeared on them in order to support white supremacy. This group, he stated, was the one that appeared on The Geraldo Rivera Show and broke the host's nose in a notorious segment. He also declared that it had been part of the cell structure idea that he had previously supported.

In 2005, Withrow was arrested after undergoing a six-hour crucifixion in Sacramento. Having been nailed to the cross by an associate, Withrow claimed that he had come up with the stunt as a protest against government policy on immigration and Iraq. The protest was stopped by police, although Withrow had already had one of his hands nailed to the board by the time they arrived.
