= 1982 United States Senate election in California =

- November 2, 1982
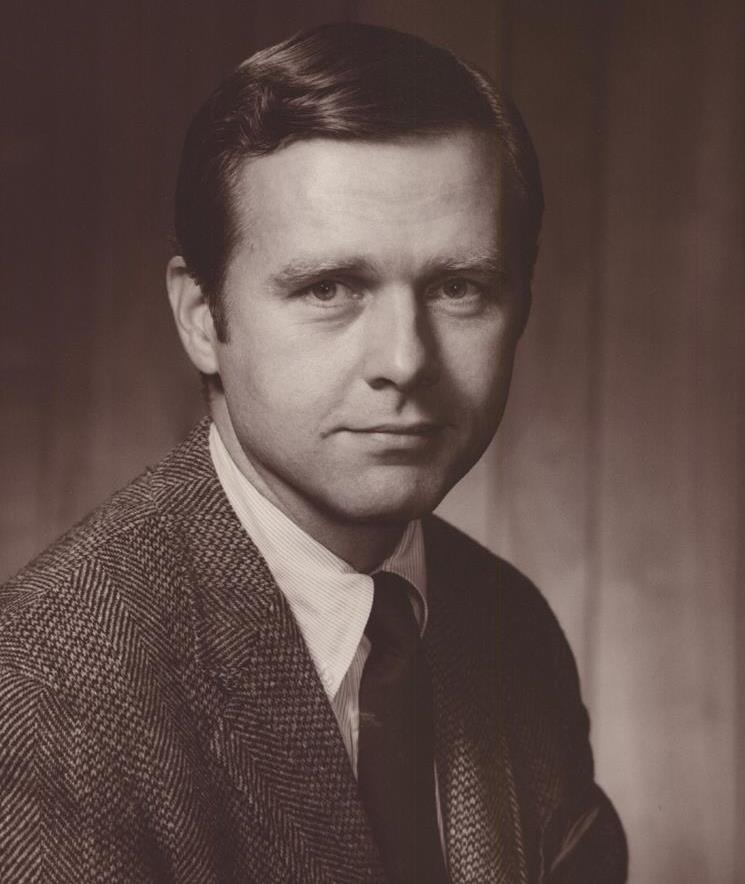

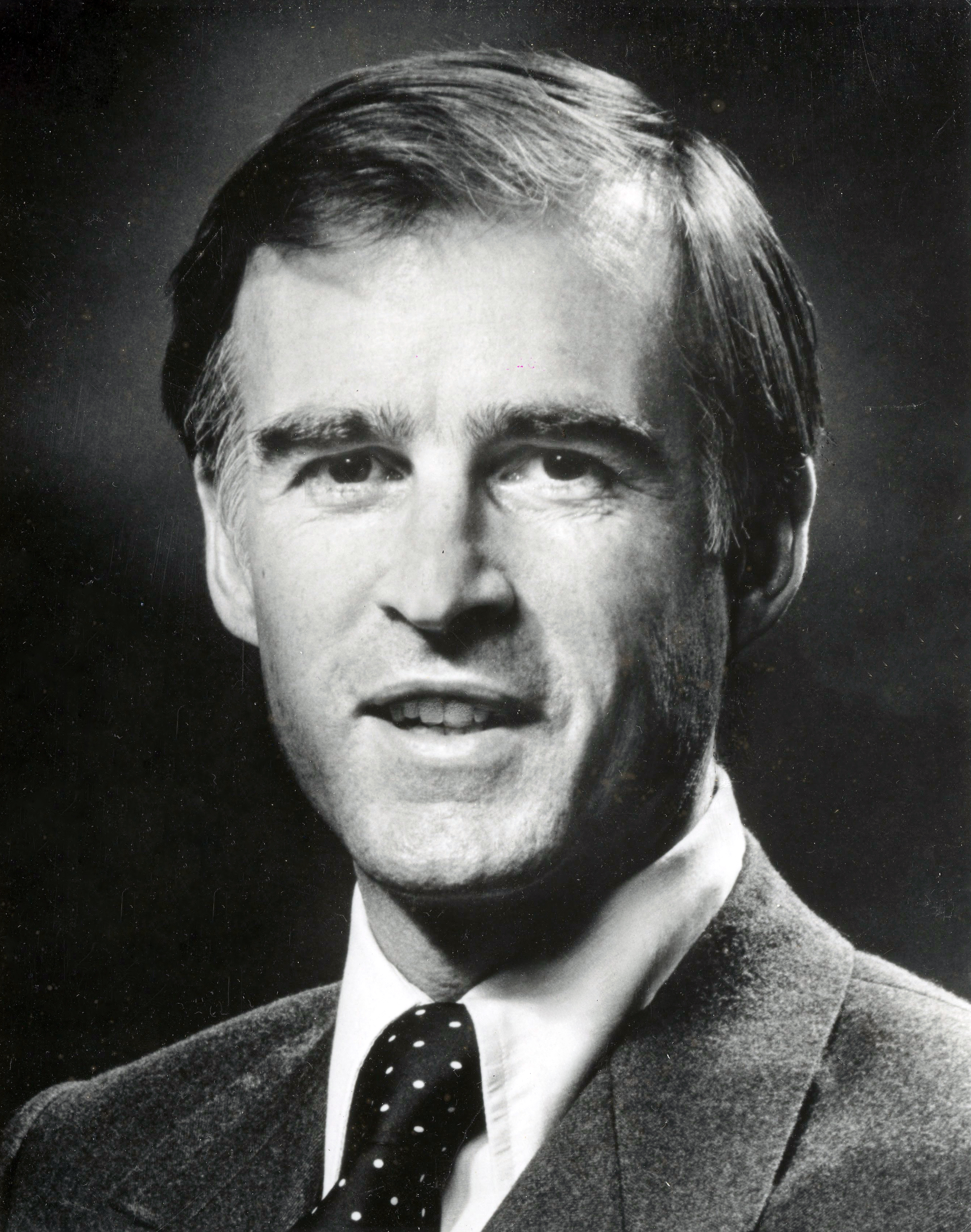
| Nominee | Pete Wilson | Jerry Brown |
| Party | Republican | Democratic |
| Popular vote | 4,022,565 | 3,494,968 |
| Percentage | 51.54% | 44.78% |
- County results Wilson: 40–50% 50–60% 60–70% 70–80% Brown: 40–50% 50–60% 60–70%
U.S. senator before election
S. I. Hayakawa
Republican
Elected U.S. Senator
Pete Wilson
Republican

The 1982 United States Senate election in California took place on November 2, 1982. Incumbent Republican U.S. Senator S. I. Hayakawa decided to retire after one term. Republican Pete Wilson, the mayor of San Diego, won Hayakawa's open seat over the Democratic candidate, incumbent and future Governor Jerry Brown, and several minor candidates.

== Republican primary ==
=== Candidates ===
- Robert K. Booher
- Ted Bruinsma, president of the Los Angeles Area Chamber of Commerce
- Rafael D. Cortes
- Bob Dornan, U.S. Representative from Garden Grove
- Barry Goldwater Jr., U.S. Representative from Woodland Hills and son of U.S. Senator Barry Goldwater
- John Hickey
- Pete McCloskey, U.S. Representative from Woodside and 1972 presidential candidate
- Edison P. McDaniels
- William H. Pemberton
- Maureen Reagan, daughter of President Ronald Reagan
- John G. Schmitz, State Senator from Corona del Mar, former U.S. Representative, and American Independent nominee for president in 1972
- William B. Shockley, recipient of the 1956 Nobel Prize in Physics
- Pete Wilson, mayor of San Diego and former Assemblyman

==== Withdrew ====
- S.I. Hayakawa, incumbent Senator since 1977

=== Campaign ===
Incumbent Senator S.I. Hayakawa became a somewhat controversial figure due to his propensity for off-color statements and for his tendency to doze off in meetings, earning him the nickname "Sleeping Sam". As a result, Hayakawa had a high unfavorability rating of 57%. In spite of this, Hayakawa initially made clear his intent to run for re-election in spite of any potential challenges.

However, Hayakawa trailed in polls badly, and at one point saw his funds dwindle down to less than $40,000. In spite of earlier promises not to, Hayakawa announced his withdrawal from the race on January 31, 1982.

=== Results ===
Results by county: Wilson: 20–30%; 30–40%; 40–50%; 50–60%; McCloskey: 30–40%; 40–50%; 50–60%; Goldwater: 20–30%; 30–40%

1982 Republican U.S. Senate primary
| Party | Candidate | Votes | % |
|---|---|---|---|
| Republican | Pete Wilson | 851,292 | 37.54% |
| Republican | Pete McCloskey | 577,267 | 25.46% |
| Republican | Barry Goldwater Jr. | 408,308 | 18.01% |
| Republican | Bob Dornan | 181,970 | 8.03% |
| Republican | Maureen Reagan | 118,326 | 5.22% |
| Republican | John G. Schmitz | 48,267 | 2.13% |
| Republican | Ted Bruinsma | 37,762 | 1.67% |
| Republican | William Shockley | 8,308 | 0.37% |
| Republican | Rafael D. Cortes | 8,064 | 0.36% |
| Republican | John Hickey | 7,737 | 0.34% |
| Republican | Robert K. Booher | 7,546 | 0.33% |
| Republican | Edison McDaniels | 6,945 | 0.31% |
| Republican | William H. Pemberton | 5,760 | 0.25% |
| Democratic | May Chote (write-in) | 15 | 0.00% |
| Total votes | | 2,267,577 | 100.00% |

== Democratic primary ==
=== Candidates ===
- Jerry Brown, Governor of California
- Walter R. Buchanan, perennial candidate
- Raymond Caplette
- Paul B. Carpenter, State Senator from Cypress and psychologist
- May Chote, candidate for U.S. Representative in 1976
- Bob Hampton
- Tom Metzger, former Grand Wizard of the Ku Klux Klan and nominee for U.S. Representative in 1980
- Richard Morgan, candidate for Senate in 1980
- William F. Wertz, follower of Lyndon LaRouche
- Gore Vidal, writer, public intellectual and grandson of former Oklahoma senator Thomas Gore
- Daniel K. Whitehurst, Mayor of Fresno

=== Results ===
1982 Democratic U.S. Senate primary
| Party | Candidate | Votes | % |
|---|---|---|---|
| Democratic | Jerry Brown | 1,392,660 | 50.67% |
| Democratic | Gore Vidal | 415,366 | 15.11% |
| Democratic | Paul B. Carpenter | 415,198 | 15.11% |
| Democratic | Daniel K. Whitehurst | 167,574 | 6.10% |
| Democratic | Richard Morgan | 94,908 | 3.45% |
| Democratic | Tom Metzger | 76,502 | 2.78% |
| Democratic | Walter R. Buchanan | 55,727 | 2.03% |
| Democratic | Bob Hampton | 37,427 | 1.36% |
| Democratic | Raymond "RayJ" Caplette | 31,865 | 1.16% |
| Democratic | William F. Wertz | 30,795 | 1.12% |
| Democratic | May Chote | 30,743 | 1.12% |
| Democratic | Daniel Fallon (write-in) | 6 | 0.00% |
| Democratic | Aristotle Scoledes (write-in) | 4 | 0.00% |
| Total votes | | 2,748,775 | 100.0 |

== General election ==
=== Campaign ===
Wilson was known as a fiscal conservative who supported Proposition 13, although he had opposed the measure while mayor of San Diego. However, Brown ran on his gubernatorial record of building the largest state budget surpluses in California history. Both Wilson and Brown were moderate-to-liberal on social issues, including support for abortion rights. The election was expected to be close, with Brown holding a slim lead in most of the polls leading up to Election Day. Wilson hammered away at Brown's appointment of California Chief Justice Rose Bird and used it to portray himself as tougher on crime than Brown. Brown's late entry into the 1980 Democratic presidential primary, after he had promised not to run, was also an issue. President Ronald Reagan made a number of visits to California late in the race to campaign for Wilson. Reagan quipped that the last thing that he wanted to see was both of his home state's U.S. Senate seats falling into Democrats' hands, especially if they were occupied by the man who had succeeded him as governor. Despite exit polls indicating a narrow Brown victory, Wilson won by 527,597 votes.

=== Results ===
General election results
| Party | Candidate | Votes | % |
|---|---|---|---|
| Republican | Pete Wilson | 4,022,565 | 51.54% |
| Democratic | Jerry Brown | 3,494,968 | 44.78% |
| Libertarian | Joseph Fuhrig | 107,720 | 1.38% |
| Peace and Freedom | David Wald | 96,388 | 1.23% |
| American Independent | Theresa Dietrich | 83,809 | 1.07% |
| Independent | Thomas Kendall (write-in) | 36 | 0.00% |
| Independent | Ben Leonik (write-in) | 34 | 0.00% |
| Republican hold | | | |

==== Results by county ====
| County | Pete Wilson Republican | | Jerry Brown Democratic | | Various candidates Other parties | | Margin | | Total votes cast |
| County | # | % | # | % | # | % | # | % | Total votes cast |
|---|---|---|---|---|---|---|---|---|---|
| Alameda | 144,195 | 37.3% | 226,780 | 58.7% | 19,665 | 4.0% | -82,585 | -21.4% | 386,640 |
| Alpine | 235 | 58.2% | 148 | 36.6% | 21 | 5.2% | 87 | 21.6% | 404 |
| Amador | 5,861 | 57.7% | 3,793 | 37.4% | 496 | 4.9% | 2,068 | 20.3% | 10,150 |
| Butte | 38,803 | 62.8% | 20,026 | 32.4% | 2,989 | 4.8% | 18,777 | 20.4% | 61,818 |
| Calaveras | 5,623 | 59.1% | 3,218 | 33.8% | 678 | 7.1% | 2,405 | 25.3% | 9,519 |
| Colusa | 2,953 | 63.9% | 1,435 | 31.1% | 230 | 4.9% | 1,518 | 32.8% | 4,618 |
| Contra Costa | 131,875 | 52.3% | 110,813 | 44.0% | 9,352 | 3.7% | 21,062 | 8.3% | 252,040 |
| Del Norte | 3,917 | 62.7% | 1,986 | 31.8% | 349 | 5.6% | 1,931 | 30.9% | 6,252 |
| El Dorado | 20,454 | 59.4% | 12,052 | 35.0% | 1,932 | 5.6% | 8,402 | 24.4% | 34,438 |
| Fresno | 81,633 | 53.9% | 64,412 | 42.5% | 5,478 | 3.6% | 17,221 | 11.4% | 151,523 |
| Glenn | 5,692 | 70.8% | 1,828 | 22.7% | 520 | 6.5% | 3,864 | 48.1% | 8,040 |
| Humboldt | 25,019 | 53.0% | 19,369 | 41.0% | 2,858 | 6.0% | 5,650 | 12.0% | 47,246 |
| Imperial | 11,472 | 57.5% | 7,602 | 38.1% | 860 | 4.2% | 3,870 | 19.4% | 19,934 |
| Inyo | 5,244 | 67.4% | 2,243 | 28.8% | 297 | 3.8% | 3,001 | 38.6% | 7,784 |
| Kern | 75,613 | 60.1% | 44,701 | 35.5% | 5,460 | 4.4% | 30,912 | 24.6% | 125,774 |
| Kings | 10,149 | 56.2% | 6,997 | 38.8% | 907 | 5.0% | 3,152 | 17.4% | 18,053 |
| Lake | 8,988 | 54.6% | 6,789 | 41.2% | 697 | 4.2% | 2,199 | 13.4% | 16,474 |
| Lassen | 4,518 | 58.0% | 2,754 | 35.3% | 524 | 6.7% | 1,764 | 22.7% | 7,796 |
| Los Angeles | 1,037,174 | 46.6% | 1,130,954 | 50.8% | 59,872 | 2.7% | -93,780 | -4.2% | 2,228,000 |
| Madera | 10,362 | 57.3% | 6,847 | 37.9% | 870 | 4.9% | 3,515 | 19.4% | 18,079 |
| Marin | 49,107 | 50.0% | 44,933 | 45.8% | 4,111 | 4.2% | 4,174 | 4.2% | 98,151 |
| Mariposa | 3,265 | 58.1% | 2,054 | 36.5% | 303 | 5.4% | 1,211 | 21.6% | 5,622 |
| Mendocino | 13,593 | 51.6% | 11,100 | 42.1% | 1,663 | 7.3% | 2,493 | 9.5% | 26,356 |
| Merced | 17,348 | 54.5% | 12,814 | 40.3% | 1,662 | 5.2% | 4,534 | 14.2% | 31,824 |
| Modoc | 2,431 | 66.5% | 968 | 26.5% | 254 | 7.0% | 1,463 | 40.0% | 3,653 |
| Mono | 2,108 | 63.8% | 1,024 | 31.0% | 170 | 5.2% | 1,084 | 32.8% | 3,302 |
| Monterey | 41,950 | 53.7% | 32,595 | 41.7% | 3,583 | 4.6% | 9,355 | 12.0% | 78,128 |
| Napa | 23,477 | 58.6% | 14,549 | 36.3% | 2,036 | 5.1% | 8,928 | 22.3% | 40,062 |
| Nevada | 15,527 | 59.9% | 9,216 | 35.6% | 1,159 | 4.5% | 6,311 | 24.3% | 25,902 |
| Orange | 445,803 | 65.7% | 211,347 | 31.1% | 21,589 | 3.3% | 234,456 | 34.6% | 678,739 |
| Placer | 28,059 | 55.7% | 19,449 | 38.6% | 2,875 | 5.7% | 8,610 | 17.1% | 50,383 |
| Plumas | 3,920 | 52.3% | 3,013 | 40.2% | 567 | 7.5% | 907 | 15.1% | 7,500 |
| Riverside | 127,934 | 57.3% | 88,106 | 39.5% | 7,068 | 3.1% | 39,828 | 17.8% | 223,108 |
| Sacramento | 161,453 | 49.5% | 152,523 | 46.7% | 12,293 | 3.8% | 8,930 | 2.8% | 326,269 |
| San Benito | 4,017 | 54.6% | 2,975 | 40.5% | 359 | 4.9% | 1,042 | 14.1% | 7,351 |
| San Bernardino | 150,054 | 56.2% | 106,951 | 40.1% | 9,898 | 3.7% | 43,103 | 16.1% | 266,903 |
| San Diego | 348,758 | 56.4% | 242,135 | 39.1% | 27,848 | 4.4% | 106,623 | 17.3% | 618,741 |
| San Francisco | 67,007 | 29.6% | 152,196 | 67.3% | 6,685 | 3.1% | -85,189 | -37.7% | 226,188 |
| San Joaquin | 59,606 | 55.0% | 44,199 | 40.8% | 4,639 | 4.3% | 15,407 | 14.2% | 108,444 |
| San Luis Obispo | 37,681 | 60.1% | 22,095 | 35.3% | 2,880 | 4.7% | 15,586 | 24.8% | 62,656 |
| San Mateo | 103,493 | 49.2% | 98,862 | 47.0% | 8,204 | 3.8% | 4,631 | 2.2% | 210,559 |
| Santa Barbara | 62,854 | 55.0% | 47,572 | 41.6% | 3,850 | 3.3% | 15,282 | 13.4% | 114,276 |
| Santa Clara | 201,969 | 49.6% | 187,805 | 46.1% | 17,302 | 4.2% | 14,164 | 3.5% | 407,076 |
| Santa Cruz | 35,021 | 45.5% | 37,287 | 48.4% | 4,661 | 6.1% | -2,266 | -2.9% | 76,969 |
| Shasta | 28,109 | 60.5% | 16,071 | 34.6% | 2,281 | 4.9% | 12,038 | 25.9% | 46,461 |
| Sierra | 952 | 51.3% | 794 | 42.8% | 108 | 5.8% | 158 | 8.5% | 1,854 |
| Siskiyou | 9,312 | 58.0% | 5,640 | 35.1% | 1,096 | 6.9% | 3,672 | 22.9% | 16,048 |
| Solano | 36,684 | 50.1% | 32,967 | 45.0% | 3,539 | 4.8% | 3,717 | 5.1% | 73,190 |
| Sonoma | 63,846 | 51.9% | 53,248 | 43.2% | 6,036 | 4.9% | 10,598 | 8.7% | 123,130 |
| Stanislaus | 40,874 | 54.4% | 30,786 | 41.0% | 3,433 | 4.5% | 10,088 | 13.4% | 75,093 |
| Sutter | 10,767 | 66.3% | 4,709 | 29.0% | 769 | 4.8% | 6,058 | 37.3% | 16,245 |
| Tehama | 10,105 | 61.9% | 5,172 | 31.7% | 1,038 | 6.4% | 4,933 | 30.2% | 16,315 |
| Trinity | 3,168 | 57.0% | 1,945 | 35.0% | 442 | 6.9% | 1,223 | 22.0% | 5,555 |
| Tulare | 41,896 | 61.4% | 23,908 | 35.0% | 2,442 | 4.6% | 17,988 | 26.4% | 68,246 |
| Tuolumne | 8,709 | 57.2% | 5,698 | 37.4% | 822 | 5.3% | 3,011 | 19.8% | 15,229 |
| Ventura | 104,972 | 58.9% | 66,325 | 37.2% | 6,830 | 3.9% | 38,647 | 21.7% | 178,127 |
| Yolo | 20,069 | 45.3% | 22,034 | 49.7% | 2,204 | 5.0% | -1,965 | -4.4% | 44,307 |
| Yuba | 6,887 | 53.8% | 5,156 | 40.3% | 763 | 4.9% | 1,731 | 13.5% | 12,806 |
| Total | 4,022,565 | 51.5% | 3,494,968 | 44.8% | 288,005 | 3.7% | 527,597 | 6.7% | 7,805,538 |

Counties that flipped from Democratic to Republican

- Humboldt
- Imperial
- Lassen
- Mendocino
- Merced
- Plumas
- Riverside
- Sierra
- Siskiyou
- Solano

Counties that flipped from Republican to Democratic

- Santa Cruz

== See also ==
- 1982 United States Senate elections
