= White student unions =

White student unions were white supremacist students' unions created as part of the white separatist movement during the 1960s and 1970s; some continued to be created into the 1980s and 1990s.

In 2015, a sudden eruption of Facebook pages that said they represented such organizations was sparked by a call from Andrew Anglin of the neo-Nazi blog The Daily Stormer and by posts on 4chan. Few of the resulting organizations have official status on university and college campuses or an organized membership, with many only existing as unsubstantiated claims in social media; coverage has generally described them as hoaxes, often by people who did not even attend the schools they claimed to represent.

== History ==
=== 1960s - 1990s ===
The first White Student Unions and similar organizations were born of the white separatist movement. In the 1960s, a White Student League was formed by white supremacist Tom Metzger and his father, but it dissipated in the 1970s. In 1979, Greg Withrow incorporated Metzger's Aryan Youth Movement into the White Student Union as a "militant extension of the student struggle." Sacramento State University started the first one, and it extended to as many as 20 chapters across the United States. These organizations were influenced by comparable right-wing organizations run by adults; students claiming association with the Sacramento State organization assaulted black students, at one point holding a black student leader out a window and threatening to drop him if planned anti-apartheid demonstrations were not called off.

Similar White Student Unions, with similarly white supremacist goals, were organized into the 1980s and 1990s. One at Temple University, founded in 1988, was focused on white pride. In 1992, another, with "avowedly White supremacist goals," was formed at the University of Minnesota. The university banned the group, but after debates about the First Amendment, the ban was lifted and the group was allowed to register as a student organization.

=== 2000s ===
In 2012 Matthew Heimbach organized a white student union at Towson University.

In November 2015, a number of White Student Union pages emerged on social media platforms such as Facebook, many apparently in response to a call to action by Neo-Nazi blogger Andrew Anglin of The Daily Stormer, a white supremacist website, who called for his readers to create pages for many different schools, even for colleges they do not attend. Many of the pages also seem to have been hoaxes coordinated on 4chan; sources have described posts there instructing users to create the pages and take screenshots of the reaction, and compared it to similar hoaxes the website produced in the past. Most coverage has described these as hoaxes, and many universities have responded by contacting Facebook to have the groups removed or have asked that online groups remove any university insignia. The University of California, for instance, later sent a mass email to all then matriculated students over the controversy caused by the pages allegedly representing schools nationwide. The UC system, among other institutions, stated that the pages were not created by or on behalf of any members of the student body they claimed to represent.

Facebook received numerous complaints and reports regarding the pages, and some of them were eventually taken down for violating the site's community standards; many others remained, but remained mostly inactive since shortly after their creation.

The people behind these Facebook accounts said the organizations were real and that they were the product of students on campus who wanted safe spaces for white students who feel stigmatized and silenced; but their pages and organizations were generally met with skepticism over their nature, purpose, and goals. While the creators of the initial string of pages have yet to be identified, some schools experienced "copycat" pages being created by actual members of the student body."

Contacted anonymously, the people behind the Facebook pages have generally denied a connection to The Daily Stormer or to Andrew Anglin's call to action, though they generally declined to identify themselves or provide proof that they were members of the schools they named. While they denied an association with racism or white supremacy, many of them said that they felt that whiteness was stigmatized or under attack; some said that their organizations contained non-white members.

=== New Zealand ===
In 2017, a White Student Union called The Auckland University European Students Association was formed in The Auckland University, the group was disbanded in late 2017.

=== Canada ===
In 2020, it was reported that a White Student Union called Students for Western Civilization said they wanted to be in McGill University in Montreal. The group was said to be run by George Hutcheson, former boyfriend of Lauren Southern. The group was reported to have been active in Toronto universities in 2015 where they had flyers promoting the group.

== See also ==
- Student activism
- Student bill of rights
- Student rights (higher education)
- Students' union
