= Morris Dees =

American attorney and activist (born 1936)

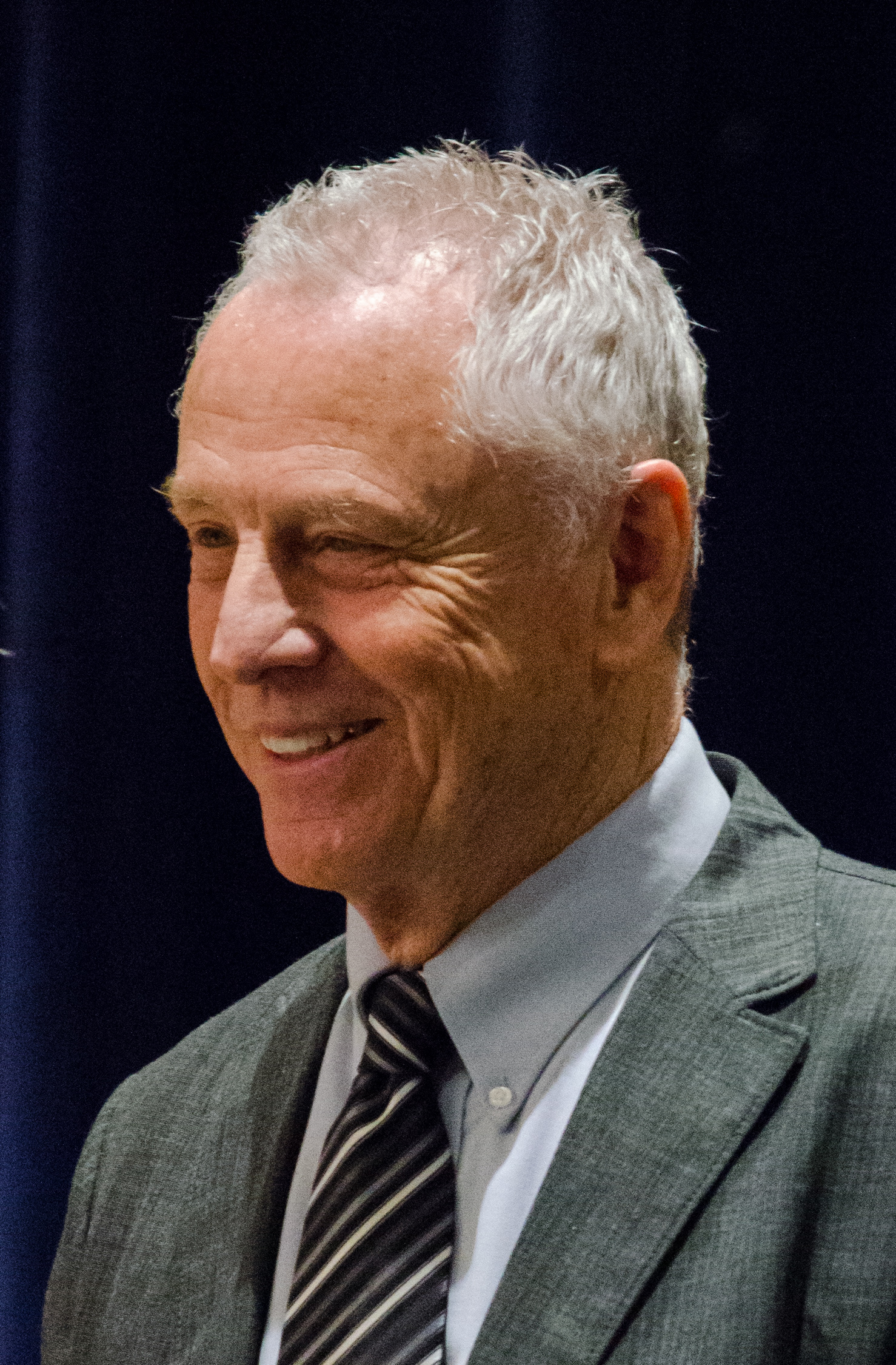
- Dees in 2015
- Born: Morris Seligman Dees Jr. December 16, 1936 (age 89); Shorter, Alabama, U.S.
- Education: University of Alabama (LLB)
- Occupations: Civil and political rights, social justice activist
- Known for: Founder of the Southern Poverty Law Center

Morris Seligman Dees Jr. (born December 16, 1936) is an American attorney, businessman, and civil rights activist who in 1971 co-founded, alongside Joseph J. Levin Jr., and served as its chief trial counsel, the Southern Poverty Law Center (SPLC).

Dees and his colleagues at the SPLC have been "credited with devising innovative ways to cripple hate groups" such as the Ku Klux Klan, particularly by using "damage litigation".

On March 14, 2019, the SPLC announced that Dees had been fired from the organization and that the SPLC would hire an "outside organization" to assess the SPLC's workplace climate. Former employees alleged that Dees was "complicit" in harassment and racial discrimination, and said that at least one female employee had accused him of sexual harassment.

== Early life and education ==
Dees was born in 1936 in Shorter, Alabama, the son of Annie Ruth (Frazer) and Morris Seligman Dees Sr., tenant cotton farmers. His family was Baptist. His grandfather named his son "Morris Seligman" after a Jewish friend. After graduating magna cum laude from the University of Alabama School of Law in 1960, Dees returned to Montgomery, Alabama, where he opened a law office.

== Marketing career ==
Dees ran a direct mail and direct marketing business, Fuller & Dees Marketing Group, with Millard Fuller. He bought Fuller out in 1964 for $1 million, much of which Fuller donated to charity. After what Dees described in his autobiography as "a night of soul searching at a snowed-in Cincinnati airport" in 1967, he sold the company in 1969 to Times Mirror, the parent company of the Los Angeles Times. While major civil rights legislation had been passed, Dees knew there were many injustices and organizations that continued to oppose minority rights. He used the revenue from the sale to found a legal firm (that eventually became the Southern Poverty Law Center) in 1971. Dees's former marketing firm partner Millard Fuller founded Habitat for Humanity International in 1976 and served there in executive roles until 2005.

== Legal career ==
In his 1991 autobiography Dees wrote that in 1962, as a young lawyer, he had represented Ku Klux Klan member Claude Henley, who faced federal charges for attacking Freedom Riders in an incident documented by a Life magazine photographer. When Dees learned that another lawyer had asked for $15,000 to represent Henley, Dees offered to do the job for $5,000, which was roughly the median household annual salary in America at the time. Dees's defense helped Henley gain an acquittal. Dees later said he had an "epiphany" and regretted defending Henley.

In 1969, Dees sued the Young Men's Christian Association (YMCA) in Montgomery, Alabama, at the request of African-American civil rights activist Mary Louise Smith. She said that her son Vincent and nephew Edward had been refused admission to attend a YMCA summer camp. The YMCA was a private organization and therefore not bound by the provisions of the Civil Rights Act of 1964, which prohibited racial discrimination in public facilities.

But Dees discovered that, in order to avoid desegregating its recreational facilities, the city of Montgomery had signed a secret agreement with the YMCA to operate them as private facilities and on the city's behalf. He introduced evidence of this agreement in court and challenged the constitutionality of the YMCA's position. The trial court ruled that the YMCA effectively had a "municipal charter" by this agreement with the city, and was therefore bound by the Fourteenth Amendment (and the Civil Rights Act) to desegregate its facilities. The United States Court of Appeals for the Fifth Circuit^{(α)} partly affirmed the trial judge's finding, reversing his order that the YMCA use affirmative action to racially integrate its board of directors. According to historian Timothy Minchin, Dees was "emboldened by this victory" when he founded the SPLC in 1971.

=== Civil lawsuit strategy ===
Dees was one of the principal architects of a strategy that used civil lawsuits to secure a court judgment for monetary damages against an organization for a wrongful act. The courts could potentially seize organization assets in order to gain payment of the judgment. Dees said that the aim was to gain large judgements which would "clean their clock".

In 1987, the SPLC and Dees sued the United Klans of America (UKA) along with Michael Figures as co-counsel and won a $7 million judgment for Beulah Mae Donald, the mother of Michael Donald, an African American who had been lynched by UKA members in Alabama. The judgment bankrupted UKA and its national headquarters building was sold for $51,875.

A decade later, in 1991, Dees obtained a judgment of $12 million against John and Tom Metzger and the White Aryan Resistance. He also helped secure a $6.5 million judgment in 2001 against the Aryan Nations. Dees's most famous cases have involved landmark damage awards that have driven several prominent neo-Nazi groups into bankruptcy, effectively causing them to disband.

=== Target of assassination ===
Dees's legal actions against racial nationalist organizations have motivated many of them to target him for assassination. As a result, he has received numerous death threats from some of these groups. In 2007, Dees said that more than 30 people had been jailed in connection with plots to either kill him or blow up the center, although a Montgomery police spokesman said he was not aware that the SPLC had informed the police of threats. The Montgomery Advertiser reported that a letter which described such a plot was sent by Hal Turner, a radio talk show host, a paid FBI informant and a white supremacist, on July 29, 2007, after the SPLC filed a lawsuit against the Imperial Klans of America (IKA) in Meade County, Kentucky. During the IKA trial, a former member of the IKA said that the Klan head told him to kill Dees. Dees and William F. McMurry represented the plaintiff in the trial against the IKA in November 2008.

== Political career ==
In 1958, Dees started his political career by working for the Southern politician George Wallace, later the governor of Alabama. Indicating his change of direction, in 1972 he served as Senator George McGovern's national finance director, in 1976 as President Jimmy Carter's national finance director, and in 1980 as national finance chairman for Senator Ted Kennedy's Democratic primary presidential campaign against Carter. And served as finance chairman for Edward Kennedy's presidential campaign in 1980.

In 2004 Dees ran for the board of the Sierra Club as a protest candidate, qualifying by petition.

== Controversies ==
Dees's critics have included the Montgomery Advertiser, which has portrayed his work with the SPLC as self-promotional, contending that Dees exaggerates the threat of hate groups. In 1994, the Montgomery Advertiser ran a series alleging that Dees discriminated against the SPLC's black employees, some of whom "felt threatened and banded together".

A 2000 article by Ken Silverstein in Harper's Magazine alleged that Dees kept the SPLC focused on fighting anti-minority groups such as the KKK, instead of focusing on issues like homelessness, mostly because of the greater fundraising potential of the former. The article also claimed that the SPLC "spends twice as much on fund-raising – $5.76 million last year – as it does on legal services for victims of civil rights abuses". Stephen Bright, an Atlanta-based civil rights attorney and former president of the Southern Center for Human Rights, wrote in 2007 that Dees was "a con man and fraud", who "has taken advantage of naive, well-meaning people – some of moderate or low incomes – who believe his pitches and give to his $175-million operation".

These comments were made after a controversy pitting Dees against much of the civil rights community in his support of the nomination of Edward E. Carnes to be a federal appeals court judge. Carnes was a well-known proponent of the death penalty, which has been shown to be disproportionately applied as a sentence against African-American men.

=== Firing from the SPLC and harassment allegations ===
In 2019, the SPLC fired Dees for undisclosed reasons, and said the firm would hire an "outside organization" to investigate its workplace practices. Before the firing, two dozen employees had complained to management about concerns of "mistreatment, sexual harassment, gender discrimination, and racism" which threatened SPLC's moral authority and integrity. A former employee said that Dees had a "reputation for hitting on young women" and that his ouster came "amid a staff revolt over the mistreatment of non-white and female employees" by Dees and SPLC leadership.

== Awards and recognition ==
- In 1993 he received the Salem Award for Human Rights and Social Justice.
- In 1990, Dees was awarded an honorary Doctor of Laws (LL.D.) degree from Whittier College.
- In 2006, the law firm of Skadden Arps partnered with the University of Alabama School of Law to create the Morris Dees Justice Award in honor of Dees, an Alabama graduate. The award is given annually to a lawyer who has "devoted his or her career to serving the public interest and pursuing justice, and whose work has brought positive change in the community, state or nation".
- The American Bar Association awarded Dees the ABA Medal, the association's highest honor, by the ABA House of Delegates in 2012.
- In addition, on March 4, 2016, Dees received the Martin Luther King Jr. Nonviolent Peace Prize, the highest award given by the King Center for Nonviolent Social Change. The award recognizes Dees' achievements in fighting racism and his commitment to nonviolence.

In the early 21st century, Dees has presented numerous lectures on civil rights and justice at universities. In 2009, he was the keynote speaker at the graduation ceremony for San Francisco State University. He was identified as a Freedom Hero by The My Hero Project.

=== Representation in other media ===
The TV movie titled Line of Fire: The Morris Dees Story (1991) dramatized his campaigns against white supremacist hate groups.

Dees's work was featured on the National Geographic's Inside American Terror in 2008.

== Bibliography ==
- Dees, Morris & Steve Fiffer (2003). A Lawyer's Journey: The Morris Dees Story. Chicago: American Bar Association. ISBN 1-57073-994-3.
- Dees, Morris (1997). Gathering Storm: America's Militia Threat. Harper Perennial. ISBN 0-06-092789-5.
- Dees, Morris & Steve Fiffer (1993). Hate on Trial: The Case Against America's Most Dangerous Neo-Nazi. New York: Villard Books. ISBN 0-679-40614-X.
- Dees, Morris; Steve Fiffer (1991). A Season for Justice: The Life and Times of Civil Rights Lawyer Morris Dees. New York: Charles Scribner's Sons. ISBN 978-0-684-19189-8.
