= Humboldt, California =

Humboldt, California may refer to:

- Humboldt Hill, California, a census-designated place
- Humboldt County, California
