= White Aryan Resistance =

Neo-Nazi organization led by Tom Metzger

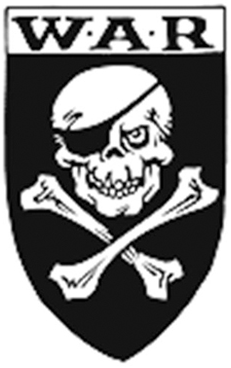
- Logo that appeared in WAR's newspaper
- Abbreviation: WAR
- Formation: 1983; 43 years ago
- Founder: Tom Metzger
- Type: Neo-Nazi organization
- Headquarters: Fallbrook, California
- Leader: Tom Metzger
- Main organ: WAR
- Formerly called: White American Political Association, White American Resistance

White Aryan Resistance (WAR), formerly the White American Political Association (WAPA) and then the White American Resistance, was a white supremacist and neo-Nazi organization in the United States which was founded and formerly led by former Ku Klux Klan Grand Dragon Tom Metzger. It was based in Warsaw, Indiana, and it was also incorporated as a business. In 1988, its leader described it as an "openly white-racist" organization.

== History ==
=== Background ===
Metzger's first group was known as the White Brotherhood, which he led in the mid-1970s until he joined David Duke's Knights of the Ku Klux Klan in 1975. By 1979 he had risen to the rank of Grand Dragon of the California realm. During these years the California realm conducted unofficial border patrols on the Mexican border. The realm also kept a blackshirted security detail which engaged in skirmishes with anti-Klan demonstrators and police.

In Oceanside, California, in the spring of 1980, an incident involved 30 members of this squad and left seven people injured. In the summer of 1980 Metzger left the national organization and founded his own organization, the California Knights of the Ku Klux Klan. From 1980 to late 1982, Metzger headed the California Knights, and during the same period, he also pursued electoral office. The White Brotherhood continued to harass Hispanics, Chinese Americans, and Vietnamese refugees.

=== Founding ===
In 1982 he left the Klan to found a new group, the White American Political Association (WAPA), a group which was dedicated to promoting "prowhite" candidates for public office. After losing the 1982 California Senate Democratic primary, Metzger abandoned the electoral route. He renamed WAPA the White American Resistance in April 1983. In September 1984, he renamed it again to the White Aryan Resistance, to reflect a more "revolutionary" stance.

The group also had a newspaper by the same name, WAR (originally for White American Resistance, but it changed its name to White Aryan Resistance as the group did, however this was at a later time). James Mason wrote several articles for the WAR paper. It was published monthly and described itself as "the most racist newspaper on earth".

By the late 1980s, Tom Metzger began broadcasting Race and Reason, a public-access cable television show, airing WAR propaganda and interviewing other neo-Nazis. The show caused much controversy, and its guests included anti-abortion speakers, Holocaust deniers and pro-segregation lawyers. WAR members gained attention through appearances on talk shows throughout the late 1980s. WAR advocated the Third Position.

In 1988 Metzger, recorded this message on his "WAR Hotline",

You have reached WAR Hotline. White Aryan Resistance. You ask: What is WAR? We are an openly white-racist movement. Skinheads, we welcome you into our ranks; the federal government is the number one enemy of our race. When was the last time you heard a politician speaking out in favor of white people? ... You say the government is too big; we can't organize. Well, by God, the SS did it in Germany, and if they did it in Germany in the thirties, we can do it right here in the streets of America. We need to cleanse this nation of all nonwhite mud-races for the survival of our own people and the generations of our children.

=== Murder of Mulugeta Seraw and civil prosecution of the Metzgers ===
On November 13, 1988, three white Aryan supremacists who were members of East Side White Pride, which allegedly had ties to WAR, beat to death Mulugeta Seraw, an Ethiopian man who had moved to the United States in order to attend college.

In October 1990, the Southern Poverty Law Center won a civil case on behalf of the deceased man's family against Tom and John Metzger and WAR, for a total of US$12.5 million. The Metzgers did not have millions of dollars, so the Seraw family only received assets from the Metzger's $125,000 house and a few thousand dollars. The Metzgers declared bankruptcy, but WAR continued to operate. WAR continued to publish their newspaper despite the verdict. Metzger launched a website in 1997 and had an Internet radio program. The cost of trial, in the hundreds of thousands of dollars, was absorbed by the SPLC and the Anti-Defamation League, according to Morris Dees, founder of the SPLC.

In 1993, the group expanded into Canada.

=== Threats against video stores by a WAR member ===
WAR was mentioned in the press when it was revealed that one of its members threatened video stores in Rhode Island because they carried Jungle Fever. In 1994, Richard Campos, a WAR sympathizer, was convicted of racially motivated bombing plots. Calls were made in which it was stated that the bombings were perpetrated by an organization called the Aryan Liberation Front, of which Campos was the only member. In early 1995, Campos was sentenced to the maximum term of 17 years in prison.

=== Inactivity ===
The group subsequently went dormant, although Metzger continued to use its name and symbols on his website and in his publication. A few skinhead groups and prison gangs also adopted the name without being formally affiliated with it. Metzger died in 2020.

== See also ==
- List of Ku Klux Klan organizations
- List of neo-Nazi organizations
- List of white nationalist organizations
