= Murder of Mulugeta Seraw =

Racially motivated murder in Portland, Oregon

Mulugeta Seraw
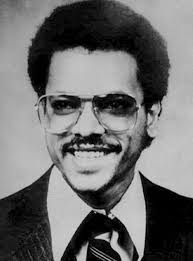
- Born: October 21, 1960; Debre Tabor, Ethiopian Empire
- Died: November 13, 1988 (aged 28); Portland, Oregon, United States
- Cause of death: Blunt trauma from baseball bat
- Known for: Killed by members of East Side White Pride and White Aryan Resistance
- Children: 1

Mulugeta Seraw (Amharic: ሙሉጌታ ስራው; October 21, 1960 – November 13, 1988) was an Ethiopian student who traveled to the United States to attend community college. He was 28 when he was murdered by three white supremacists in November 1988 in Portland, Oregon. They were convicted. Mulugeta's father and son, who was six years old, filed (and won) a civil lawsuit against the killers and an affiliated organization White Aryan Resistance (known as WAR) holding them liable for the murder.

== Background ==
Mulugeta was a student at Portland Community College.

On the night of November 12, 1988, Kenneth Murray "Death" Mieske, Kyle Brewster, and Steve Strasser, members of groups known as East Side White Pride and White Aryan Resistance (WAR), were driving around Portland with their girlfriends, intending to return home. The three confronted three black men, including Mulugeta, who had been dropped off in front of his apartment. As he tried to break up the fight, Mulugeta was beaten with a baseball bat on Southeast 31st Avenue by Mieske. The three perpetrators and their girlfriends left him in a puddle of blood. He died the next day.

Mieske said he, Brewster, and Strasser killed Mulugeta "because of his race." In response, hundreds of people turned out for rallies against racism. Meanwhile, Tom Metzger, head of WAR, said the supremacists did a "civic duty" by killing the Ethiopian student.

After one week of investigation, Mieske, Brewster, and Strasser were arrested. Brewster and Strasser were convicted of manslaughter and assault. Brewster was released in November 2002, but in 2006 violated parole and was sent back to prison. Brewster was again released, and has been documented at Proud Boys rallies and fighting alongside them in brawls.

In 1990, Mieske pleaded guilty to murder and was sentenced to life in prison. He died in prison on July 26, 2011, at the age of 45. At the time of his death, he was still being referred to as a "Prisoner of War" by white power groups.

In October 1990, Mulugeta's father and son, represented at no cost by the Southern Poverty Law Center and the Anti-Defamation League, won a civil case against White Aryan Resistance's operator Tom Metzger and his son John Metzger for a total of $12.5 million. The cost of the trial, which measured in the hundreds of thousands of dollars, was absorbed by the SPLC and the ADL. As Metzger was unable to cover the damages, the lawyer of Mulugeta's family decided to file legal documents in order to have his Fallbrook, California home and his assets seized. As a result, the house was transferred to Mulugeta's estate for a value of $121,500; Metzger was allowed to keep $45,000 under California's Homestead Act. Metzger was warned that any damage caused to the house would result in a lawsuit; nonetheless, he chose to leave the property "a mess" with cracked windows, but apparently did not cause any serious damage. The Metzgers declared bankruptcy, but WAR continued to operate. Metzger himself was forced to move into an apartment and collect welfare. As of 2007, he was still making payments to Mulugeta's family.

== Reaction to the murder ==
Approximately 18 months after Mulugeta's death, 1,500 people attended a rally along the South Park Blocks. Among the participants were assistant U.S. Attorney Michael Brown, prosecuting deputy district attorney Norm Frink, Margaret Carter, Bud Clark, and several city commissioners, as well as at least five members of Skinheads Against Racial Prejudice. There were 150 police officers on hand, as up to 300 skinheads were expected to oppose the rally; previously, the largest number of police officers required for an event in Portland were the 90 officers in attendance at an Elvis Presley concert in 1957, and a Run-DMC concert in 1987. Bomb disposal squads, bomb-sniffing dogs, riot police, and a police helicopter were used, but the rally occurred without any major incident.

Also in 1990 in response to Mulugeta's death, members of the Oregon chapter of the American Leadership Forum formed an experiential anti-discrimination youth camp based on the National Conference for Community and Justice "Anytown, U.S.A." curriculum. Operating from 1990 to 2002, Camp Odyssey facilitated a week-long journey for teenagers in the Pacific Northwest, examining systems of oppression and fostering communication amongst a widely diverse group of participants. In early 2010, a small group of alumni formed a not-for-profit organization called The Piece, which achieved designation as an Oregon Solutions project and oversaw the revival of Camp Odyssey which ran again from 2011 through 2015.

== See also ==
- List of homicides in Oregon
