= Tom Metzger =

American white supremacist (1938–2020)

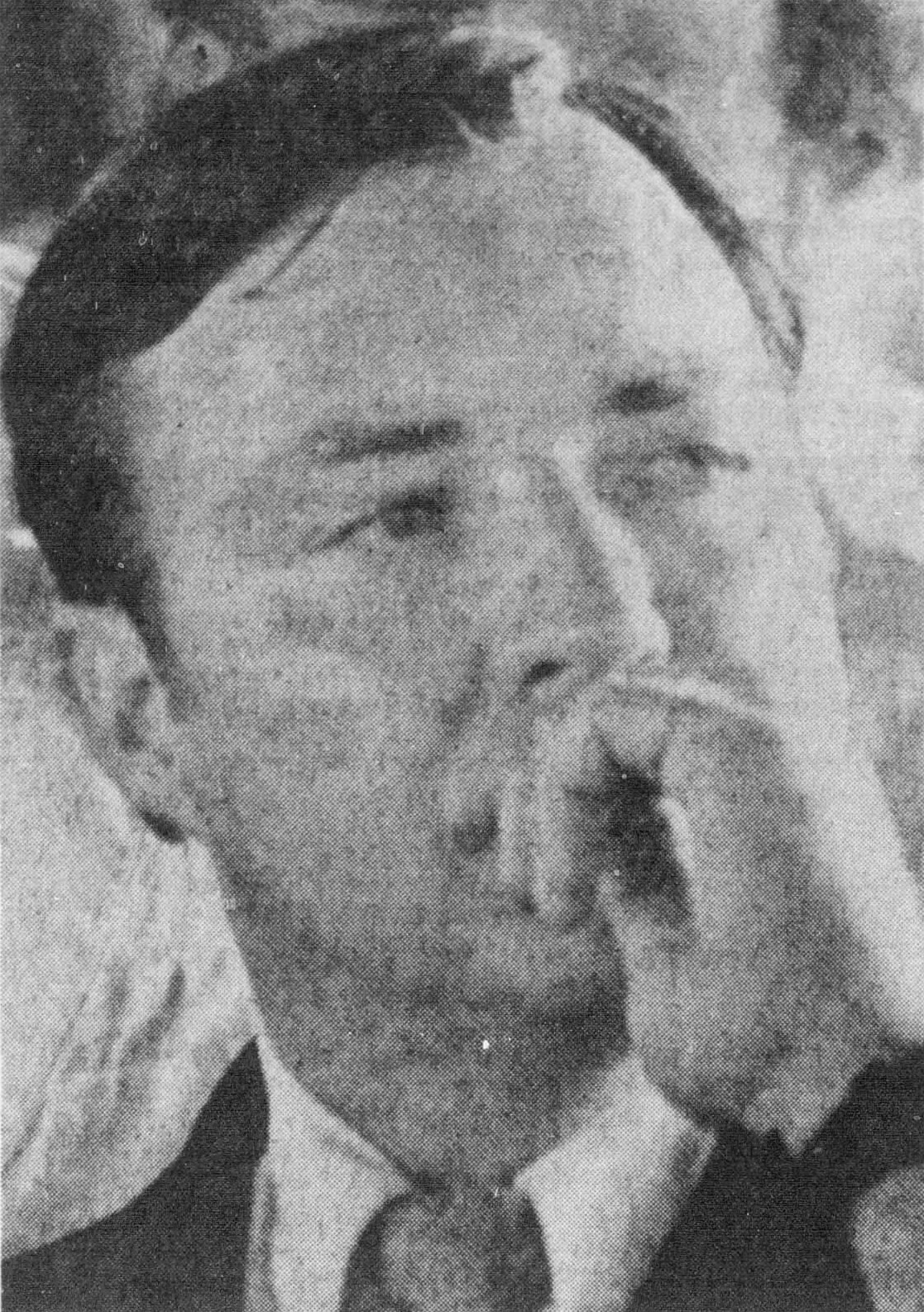
- Metzger in 1980
- Born: Thomas Byron Linton; April 9, 1938; Warsaw, Indiana, U.S.
- Died: November 4, 2020 (aged 82); Hemet, California, U.S.
- Known for: Head of the White Aryan Resistance; Grand Dragon of the Ku Klux Klan in the 1970s
- Spouse: Kathleen Murphy (m. 1963; died 1992)
- Children: 6

Thomas Linton Metzger (born Thomas Byron Linton; April 9, 1938 – November 4, 2020) was an American white supremacist, neo-Nazi leader and Klansman. He founded White Aryan Resistance (WAR), a neo-Nazi organization, in 1983. He was a Grand Dragon of the Ku Klux Klan in the 1970s. Metzger voiced strong opposition to immigration to the United States, and was an advocate of the Third Position. He was incarcerated in Los Angeles County, California, and Toronto, Ontario, and was the subject of several lawsuits and government inquiries. He, his son, and WAR were found liable for a total of $12.5 million in damages as a result of the murder of Mulugeta Seraw, 28, an Ethiopian student, by skinheads in Portland, Oregon who were affiliated with WAR.

== Early life ==
Thomas Byron Linton was born in Warsaw, Indiana, the son of Thomas Linton and Willodean Rickel. His mother was a waitress, while his father was a draftsman working at an engineering company. They married in Chicago, but Linton Sr. moved away to California soon after, leaving Willodean alone. She returned to her hometown of Warsaw and gave birth to Linton Jr. shortly thereafter.

In his early life, he was primarily raised by his mother; Linton Sr. did not financially assist in his son's upbringing, and after an attempt to visit him was jailed for his failure to pay child support. When Linton Jr. was 4, his mother married Cloice Metzger, a man 20 years her senior; Cloice Metzger had at least two other families in the area, worked a variety of odd jobs, and was at times violent. Linton Jr. was afterwards enrolled in school as Thomas Linton Metzger, though his stepfather only formally adopted him in 1963. Metzger attended a variety of schools as his family moved place to place. At the same time, his biological father (by then with his own family in California and a prominent engineer) repeatedly attempted to contact Metzger against the wishes of Willodean, leading to verbal abuse from Willodean.

He served in the U.S. Army from 1961 until 1964, when he moved to Southern California to work in the electronics industry. For a short time, he was a member of the right-wing group the John Birch Society, and attended anti-communist luncheon meetings sponsored by the Douglas Aircraft Corporation. However, he eventually left the group when it rejected his antisemitic views.

== White supremacy ==
By 1968, Metzger had moved to Fallbrook, California, and he supported independent George C. Wallace for president. Metzger stopped paying taxes in the 1970s, and by 1972 his tax protest over the Vietnam War had destroyed his thriving television business but introduced him to other tax protesters who, he said, were "atheist racists, Christian Identity racists, Nazis, all kinds of people."

From 1971 to 1980, Metzger was the pastor of a Christian Identity church. However, he later became disillusioned with Christian Identity and became an atheist.

=== Ku Klux Klan ===
During the 1970s, Metzger joined the Knights of the Ku Klux Klan, which was led by David Duke, and he eventually became the Grand Dragon of the State of California. Metzger's Klan organization also had a security force which was involved in confrontations with communists and anti-Klan protesters.

Metzger's branch of the Klan split from Duke's organization in 1980 to form the California Knights of the Ku Klux Klan. Also in 1979, he took Greg Withrow of the White Student Union "under his wing", which later became the Aryan Youth Movement (AYM), for youth associated with White Aryan Resistance.

In 1985, Metzger attended a Nation of Islam rally in San Diego, led by Louis Farrakhan. During the rally, he compared America to a "rotting carcass" and praised Farrakhan for "understanding" that Jews are "living off the carcass" and called them "parasites."

=== White Aryan Resistance ===
In 1982 Metzger left the Klan to found a new group, the White American Political Association (WAPA), a group dedicated to promoting "prowhite" candidates for office. After losing the 1982 California Senate Democratic primary, Metzger abandoned the electoral route and reorganized WAPA as White American Resistance in 1983, and then reorganized it as White Aryan Resistance, to reflect a more "revolutionary" stance. In this period, Metzger became influenced by James Mason's newsletter Siege. While Siege would several decades later have substantial influence when collected into book form, Metzger was one of the very few people to have read it in its original periodical form; he wrote that it had had a strong influence on him.

In 1983, he established the newspaper WAR as the official publication of the White American Political Association.

In 1985 Metzger attended a rally of the Nation of Islam. Despite Metzger's open racism towards blacks, he alleged the two groups had common ground based on their desire for racial separation and their hatred of Jewish people. Metzger and an NOI representative claim Metzger provided information on the alleged violent plans of the Jewish Defense League, a far-right extremist organization. Metzger donated $100 to the Nation of Islam, to which a Nation of Islam representative said, "I don't think that when you give $100 you form an alliance."

Metzger made numerous television appearances in addition to hosting his own cable TV public-access television show, Race and Reason. In one of his first cable episodes, Metzger invited the gothic rock band Radio Werewolf onto the show, during which a confused Metzger was given an honorary membership in the band. In November 1988, his son John appeared on an episode of the Geraldo show in which a brawl broke out and Geraldo Rivera's nose was broken. Metzger also appeared on Wally George's Hot Seat show with Irv Rubin, the chairman of the Jewish Defense League, in what was a very contentious debate. The debate ended when Rubin threw water in the face of Metzger. Security intervened and the Anaheim police were called. Art Bell interviewed Metzger on his overnight call-in radio show, and mentioned his Filipino wife, asking: "'I am married to a brown-skinned Asian woman. What does that make me?' To which Metzger replied, 'A traitor to your race.'"

=== Oregon civil trial ===
The group was eventually bankrupted as the result of a civil lawsuit centered on its involvement in the 1988 murder of Mulugeta Seraw, an Ethiopian man who had moved to the United States to attend a community college. In 1988, white power skinheads affiliated with WAR were convicted of killing Seraw and sent to prison. Kenneth Mieske said he and the two others killed Mulugeta "because of his race." Metzger declared that they did a "civic duty" by killing Mulugeta. Morris Dees and the Southern Poverty Law Center filed a civil suit against him, arguing that WAR influenced Seraw's killers by encouraging their group East Side White Pride to commit violence.

Metzger's trial was held in October 1990. His decision to represent himself became the source of considerable civic derision through the legal incompetence which he displayed—never more so than when he accepted an option for a new trial judge during the initial stages of the trial in place of the interim appointed judge who he thought was Jewish; only after he had made his decision did he discover that the new judge, Ancer L. Haggerty, was African American.

At the trial, WAR national vice president Dave Mazzella testified about how the Metzgers instructed WAR members to commit violence against minorities. Tom and his son John Metzger were found civilly liable under the doctrine of vicarious liability, in which one can be liable for a tort committed by a subordinate or another person who is taking instructions. The jury returned the largest civil verdict in Oregon history at the time—$12.5 million—against Metzger and WAR. The Metzgers' house was seized, and most of WAR's profits went to paying off the judgment.

=== Post-Oregon trial ===
After the trial, Metzger's home was transferred to Seraw's estate for $121,500, while Metzger was allowed to keep $45,000 under California's Homestead Act. The Southern Poverty Law Center and the Anti-Defamation League came up with the $45,000 needed to pay Metzger for the home. Metzger was warned that any damages left in the house would result in a lawsuit, and while he left it in "a mess" with cracked windows, there was no serious damage. As a result of the sale of his home, he was forced to move into an apartment.

In May 1991, Metzger agreed to stop selling T-shirts of Bart Simpson in a Nazi uniform with the words "Pure Nazi Dude" and "Total Nazi Dude". In 1991, he was convicted of burning a cross in 1983, and sentenced to six months in prison and 300 hours of community service by working with minorities. Also convicted were Stanley Witek and Brad Kelly. Metzger was released from prison after 45 days so he could be with his critically ill wife. His wife died on March 6, 1992, from lung cancer.

In May 1992, when Republican presidential candidate Pat Buchanan visited Smuggler's Gulch at the Mexico–United States border to deliver a news conference for support of increased border security and opposition to illegal immigration as part of his presidential campaign, Metzger and his supporters gatecrashed the news conference. Metzger said he wanted to talk to Buchanan about getting “action” done to control the border. He suggested that the National Guard be stationed at the border with orders to “shoot to kill” to stop illegal immigration.

In 1992, Metzger and his son John violated a court order not to leave the country and entered Canada to speak to the Heritage Front. Soon afterwards, he was arrested for violating Canadian immigration laws by entering the country to "promote racial hatred". With his son John, Metzger was jailed for five days for breaking Canadian immigration laws, as he had done so "to promote race hatred".

From the early 1990s, Metzger advocated the "lone wolf" method of action. Metzger and white supremacist activist Alex Curtis, an acolyte of Metzger, are commonly credited with coining the term of "lone wolf terrorism", which they both advocated. At the time, extremist right-wing groups were being heavily infiltrated by outsiders, hampering their activities. Any groups that suggested violent action were regularly the target of lawsuits for vicarious liability in the event that any occurred for inciting the violent acts. Metzger later appeared in support of Curtis in court.

In 2003, Metzger appeared in Louis and the Nazis, a documentary made by Louis Theroux.

Metzger moved to Warsaw, Indiana at some point in the mid-2000s. In 2004, he was the subject in an online article from a San Diego-based alt weekly San Diego CityBeat that outlined his love of karaoke, sparse white activist action, and bemused feelings over the state of his hoped-for white revolution. He stated that he had picked up karaoke after losing his wife and the trial, to keep himself occupied; he said that "Otherwise, I’d be an alcoholic." The story was a finalist for the Association of Alternative Newsmedia's annual award for best feature story.

On June 2, 2009, agents of the Bureau of Alcohol, Tobacco and Firearms raided Metzger's home. No arrests were made and no information was released on what was found inside his house. Metzger was allowed to leave the premises during the search and stated that address books, compact discs, tapes and computers were seized in the raid. This was connected with two arrested brothers accused of a mail bomb attack that injured a diversity director in Arizona.

Metzger was mandated to make payments to Mulugeta's family for the remainder of his life. Metzger hosted an Internet radio talk show and by 2018 no longer resided in Indiana, having moved back to California.

== Mainstream party politics ==
Metzger changed political parties several times and sometimes created his own. In 1980, he won the Democratic Party nomination for the U.S. House of Representatives with over 40,000 votes in a San Diego area district. This led the Democratic Party to disavow his candidacy and take the unusual step of endorsing his opponent, Republican Clair Burgener. Metzger lost to Burgener by over 200,000 votes in a heavily Republican district.

In 1982 he sought the Democratic Party's senatorial nomination, running against then-Governor Jerry Brown and author Gore Vidal, winning only 76,000 votes (2.8% of the vote) in the primary.

In 2010, Metzger took out an advertisement in the Warsaw Times-Union to announce his intention to challenge, as an independent, U.S. Representative Mark Souder, a Republican from Indiana's 3rd congressional district. "I'd go to Washington and get into Congress, and have a fistfight every day," Metzger told a local news station. Metzger did not make it onto the ballot for the election, which was ultimately won by Republican Marlin Stutzman.

== Views ==
According to Stephen Atkins, author of The Encyclopedia of Right-Wing Extremism in Modern American History, Metzger's ideology "differs from other white supremacists by rejecting the basic tenets of the Christian Identity movement because he considers himself to be the champion of the Third Position. The Third Position is a form of racism that is oriented towards attracting the white working class and it is also anti-capitalist in orientation. Metzger believed that the United States should be divided into designated areas for different racial groups except Asian Americans, who should be expelled from the United States." In 1988, Metzger recorded this message on his WAR Hotline:

"You have reached WAR Hotline. White Aryan Resistance. You ask: What is WAR? We are an openly white-racist movement—Skinheads, we welcome you into our ranks. The federal government is the number one enemy of our race. When was the last time you heard a politician speaking out in favor of white people? [...] You say the government is too big; we can’t organize. Well, by God, the SS did it in Germany, and if they did it in Germany in the thirties, we can do it right here in the streets of America. We need to cleanse this nation of all nonwhite mud-races for the survival of our own people and the generations of our children."

== Death ==
He died on November 4, 2020, of Parkinson's disease.

== Electoral history ==
California's 43rd Congressional District Democratic Primary election, June 3, 1980
Party	Candidate	Votes	%
Democratic	Tom Metzger	33,071	37.1
Democratic	Ed Skagen	32,679	36.6
Democratic	Hubert Higgins	23,462	26.3
Total votes		89,212	100.0
Turnout			

1980 United States House of Representatives elections
Party	Candidate	Votes	%
Republican	Clair W. Burgener (incumbent)	298,815	86.6
Democratic	Tom Metzger	46,361	13.4
Total votes		345,176	100.0
Turnout			
Republican hold			

United States Senatorial Democratic Primary election, June 8, 1982
Party	Candidate	Votes	%
Democratic	Jerry Brown	1,392,660	50.7
Democratic	Gore Vidal	415,366	15.1
Democratic	Paul B. Carpenter	415,198	15.1
Democratic	Daniel K. Whitehurst	167,574	6.1
Democratic	Richard Morgan	94,908	3.4
Democratic	Tom Metzger	76,502	2.8
Democratic	Walter R. Buchanan	55,727	2.0
Democratic	Bob Hampton	37,427	1.4
Democratic	Raymond "RayJ" Caplette	31,865	1.2
Democratic	William F. Wertz	30,795	1.1
Democratic	May Chote	30,743	1.1
Total votes		2,748,765	100.0
Turnout			
