= Pannonius =

Pannonius (lit. "of Pannonia", historically in reference to the Kingdom of Hungary) may refer to:

- Andreas Pannonius (c. 1420 – after 1472), Hungarian theologian
- Janus Pannonius (1434–1472), Croatian–Hungarian poet
- Gregorius Coelius Pannonius (?–1552), Hungarian theologian
