= François Rotger =

Canadian film director (born 1963)

François Rotger is a Canadian independent film director born in 1963.

Former music video director, his first feature film The Passenger debuted at the 2005 Locarno International Film Festival.

From his early work, 74km avec elle (8 min, France, 35mm color) and Jan (21 min, France, HDcam color) author/director François Rotger explores the themes of deception and betrayal within the family circle, often leading to sudden and extreme violence.

== Works ==
Rotger's first short film, made in 2001, was 74km avec elle (8 min, 35mm color) featuring Bambou (Caroline von Paulus) as the main character, a desenchanted wife sleeping with a man she's met on the road just to find her husband's car wrecked in a terrible car accident.

In 2003, his second short film, Jan (22 min, Hdcam, color), with the French actor Jeannick Gravelines, was produced in France by Tom Dercourt.

In 2004/2005, a first feature film, The Passenger (88 min, 35mm color), was shot in Canada and Japan. The extremely severe weather conditions in north Canada delayed completion of the film, finally edited and ready for the 2005 Locarno International Film Festival. It was produced in France, Canada, and Japan; and has dialogue in French, Japanese and English.

After Locarno, The Passenger was selected for Tokyo International Film Festival, and Angers's Premiers Plans European Film Festival. Since November 2009, a DVD has been released for The Passenger.

During the shooting of the second half of the film, on location in Tokyo, Rotger started to work on a new project, initially intended to be published as a novel. Working on some friend’s biographical material, he soon realised this would become his next film. Based on both accurate events and fictional material, Story of Jen is presented as a reconstruction of a personal experience «It was like I was writing, feeling my distant friend’s hand on my shoulder».

Story of Jen was shot in 2008, in Canada, starring Laurence Leboeuf, a young Canadian actress winner of 2009 Jutra award, Cesar-awarded French actress Marina Hands, and Tony Ward, an underground icon previously starring in Bruce LaBruce’s controversial Hustler White. Once again, Rotger weaves fact and fiction, reporting on a «war zone» mostly set within the family circle. Distortion of reality goes as far as an evocation of Tony Ward’s character’s last esoteric vision as he passes away. Story Of Jen proved to be as controversial as The Passenger, dividing both the public and the press. Cahiers du cinéma praised the "unique uncompromised vision", when others were just appalled by the graphic violence and the "disturbing description of a distressed adolescent psyche".

Story of Jen premiered on 10 June 2009 and a DVD was released on November of the same year. It has been nominated to several international festivals, starting in August 2008 for the Locarno Festival, in official competition.

François Rotger is also credited for Story of Jen's original soundtrack, both as composer and performer] of the score.

Rotger is currently working on EVLYXES, a modern epic based on both James Joyce and Homer's Odyssey.

== Filmography ==
=== Director and writer ===
- 2001 74km avec elle (France, 8 min, 35mm color)
- 2003 Jan (France, 22 min, Hdcam, color)
- 2005 The Passenger (Canada, Japan, 88 min, 35mm color)
- 2008 Story of Jen (Canada, 110min, 35mm color)
