= Oberhuber =

Oberhuber is a surname. Notable people with the surname include:

- Günter Oberhuber (1954–2021), Austrian ice hockey player
- Hans-Peter Oberhuber (born 1962), German speed skater
- Konrad Oberhuber (1935–2007), American curator
- Oswald Oberhuber (1931–2020), Austrian painter, sculptor, and graphic artist
- Veronika Oberhuber (born 1967), Italian luger
