= Andreas Pannonius =

Hungarian Carthusian friar and theological writer

O.Cart. Andreas Pannonius
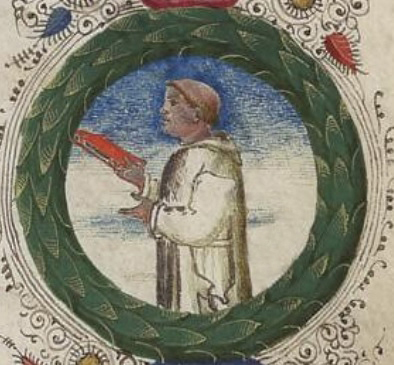
- Miniature depicting Andreas Pannonius (Libellus de virtutibus Matthiae Corvino dedicatus, 1467)
- Born: c. 1420; Hungary
- Died: after 1472; Rome (?), Papal States
- Education: University of Padua
- Occupations: Theologian; friar
- Writing career
- Language: Latin
- Period: 1450s–1471
- Notable works: Expositio super Cantica canticorum Salomonis, Libellus de virtutibus Matthiae Corvino dedicatus, Libellus de virtutibus Herculi Estensi dedicatus

Andreas Pannonius or Andreas Ungarus (Hungarian: Magyarországi András; c. 1420 – after 1472) was a 15th-century Hungarian Carthusian friar and theological writer. He is the first author of medieval Hungarian theological literature who also created something noteworthy for international theological literature.

Among his works, a commentary on the Song of Songs (Canticle of Canticles) and two mirrors for princes dedicated to Matthias Corvinus and Ercole I d'Este were preserved. His writings are considered to form a transition from medieval Scholasticism to Renaissance humanism.

== Biography ==
=== Early life ===
Andreas Pannonius was born around 1420 in the Kingdom of Hungary. His parentage is unknown. Based on sporadic Hungarian phrases and sentences in his Latin works, he was of Hungarian ethnicity. Historian Vilmos Fraknói considered that he was born into a wealthy noble family.

In his youth, Andreas entered military service and was a soldier in the army John Hunyadi for five years. He was present when Matthias, Hunyadi's son and the future king of Hungary, was baptized in Kolozsvár (present-day Cluj-Napoca, Romania) sometime after February 1443. Andreas participated in the Battle of Varna in November 1444. It can be concluded from his works that he may have belonged to Hunyadi's closest entourage. Based on personal experience, he recalled the governor's family relationships, judicial practice, night prayers, and military activities.

=== In Italy ===
He left Hungary for unknown reasons, perhaps on a pilgrimage to the Holy Land. Prior to his journey to Jerusalem, he joined the Order of Carthusians in Venice in 1445. He chose the Carthusians despite his former contact with the Franciscans in Hunyadi's army. Andreas praised them for their dignified asceticism, their "sublime contemplation of divine dignity and meditation on heavenly things". It is conceivable that the cataclysm of the Battle of Varna had a great impact on him, causing his life to completely change.

Andreas lived in the St. Andrew charterhouse (Sant'Andrea del Lido) in Venice for the next decade and a half, until 1459. After finishing the Scuola di Rialto, it is possible that he studied theology at the University of Padua sometime during this period, as evidenced by his Thomist qualification. Within the walls of the Carthusian charterhouse, he had access to numerous theological, scholastic, and humanist manuscripts and codices, which he was then able to utilize in his later works. In Padua, he got acquainted with fellow Hungarian cleric Stephen Várdai, who studied there from 1447 to 1450. As a confessor and teacher, Andreas came into contact with the patrician families of Venice. According to his own statement, many of them joined the Carthusians under his influence, including a wealthy merchant Giorgio Calordano. He maintained a friendly relationship with Candiano Bollani, a Venetian statesman and diplomat, and also a lay theologian. When Bollani compiled his Hexaemeron commentary in the 1460s, he sent and dedicated it to Andreas, who lived in Ferrara by then.

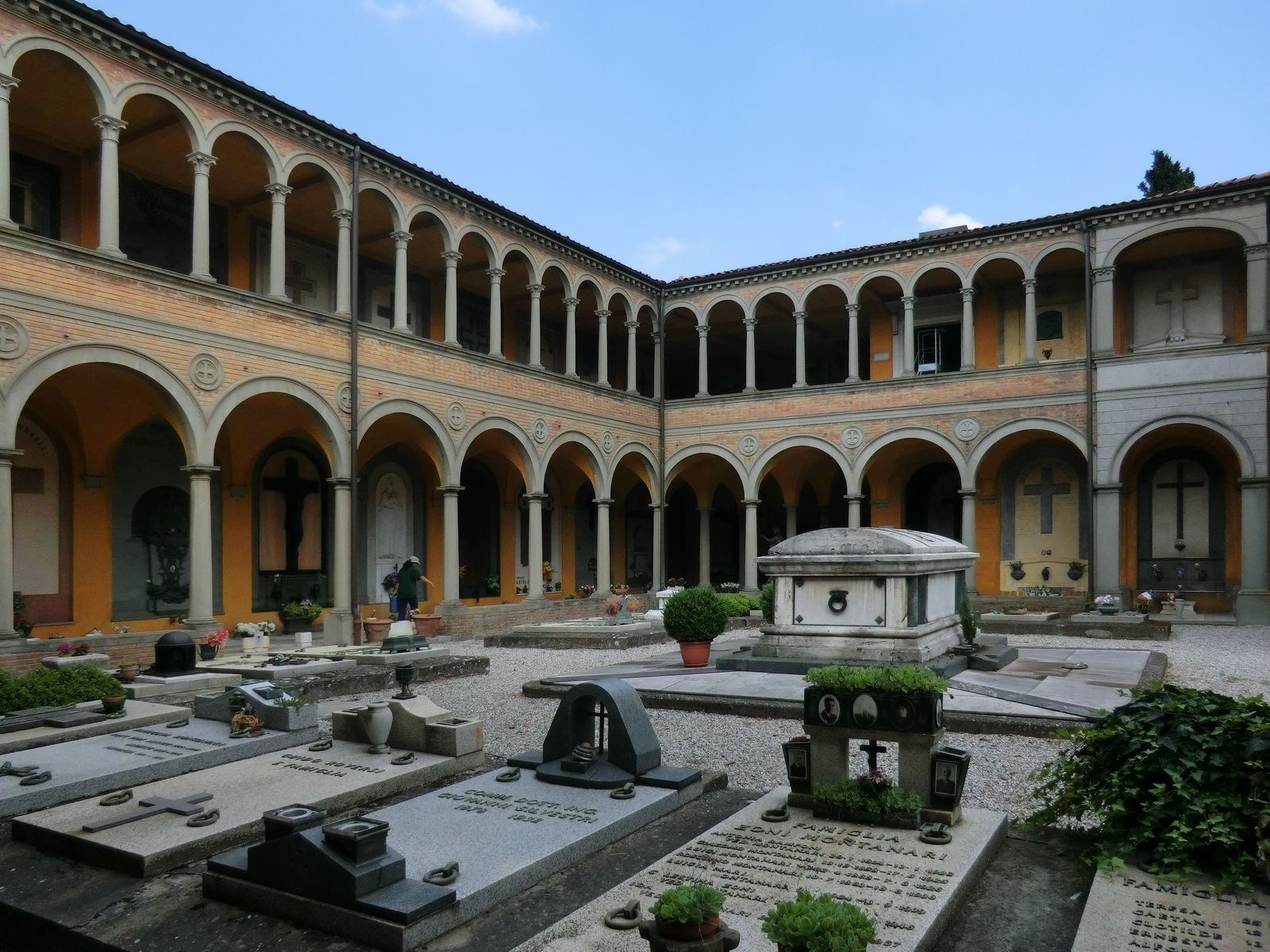
The courtyard of the Certosa di Bologna (now a cemetery)

Andreas was transferred by his order to the Saint Jerome charterhouse of Bologna in 1459. Here he continued to write his theological works. So far, he was done with various speeches, a treatise on the Holy Spirit, and commentaries on the Sentences written by Peter Lombard, the Book of Psalms and the Song of Songs. This list was preserved by the necrology of the Certosa di Bologna under the year 1460, 1464 or 1469, which previously suggested that Andreas died there. In Bologna, Andreas got acquainted physician Geronimo Ranuzzi and his lord Angelo Capranica, who was governor of the city and cardinal-protector of the Carthusians at the Holy See. Capranica was advocate to launch a new crusade against the Ottoman Turks, as well as Andreas. It is possible he also met Galeotto Marzio, then a professor of the University of Bologna. He developed the closest relationship with legal scholar Bornio da Sala. In 1459, Bornio was asked to deliver a welcome speech on the occasion of the arrival of Pope Pius II in Bologna. Instead of this, Bornio pronounced an invective against corruption and depravity addressed to his fellow city inhabitants. The legal scholar dedicated his work Contra impietatem Iudeorum to Andreas, whom he also asked to provide professional, theological proofreading of the dissertation ("censor et iudex") citing his "strict lifestyle, moral holiness", in addition to his literary and theological knowledge "outshining everyone else".

By 1464, Andreas already resided in the Ferrara Charterhouse, which was consecrated a few years ago. In that year, Francesco Ariosti, a court scientist of Duke Borso d'Este visited him in his cell which was filled with manuscript collections. He described Andreas as a "man who is among the foremost in knowledge, perfectly trained in the scriptures", who was also "a unique and admirable example of monastic discipline". In the spring of 1465, Andreas stayed in the Florence Charterhouse, when a Hungarian diplomatic mission led by Janus Pannonius arrived the city to negotiate to gain financial support for a campaign against the Ottoman Empire. Shortly after, he was installed as prior of the Certosa di Bologna, succeeding Giovanni Montefortino.

=== Vicar and prior ===
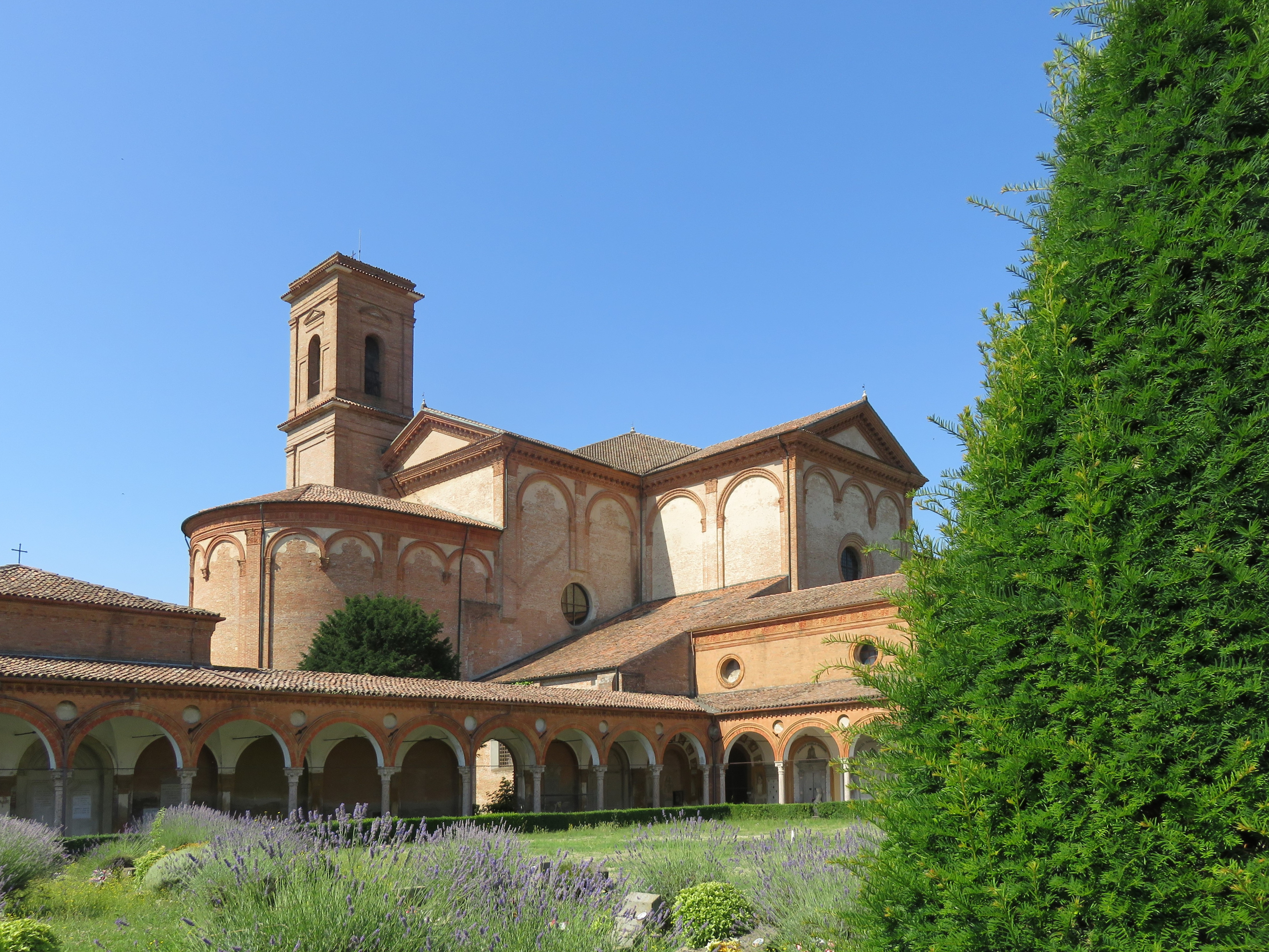
The Ferrara Charterhouse, where Andreas served as vicar (1466–69) then prior (1469–70)

In May 1466, he was again transferred to Ferrara to become vicar of the local charterhouse, serving under newly appointed prior Montefortino. When Andreas compiled his speculum regum to Matthias Corvinus, he dedicated his work as vicar of Ferrara in September 1467. In that time, the Carthusians was actively patroned by Borso d'Este. During his stay in Ferrara, Andreas maintained contact with the local Hungarian students who attended the university – for instance, Benedict Lővei, Ladislaus Geréb de Vingárt, Sigismund Pálóci and Nicholas Perényi. In his aforementioned work, Andreas called Ferrara as a "second Athens", where Greek eloquence flourishes alongside Latin. Academics of the university, such as Michele Savonarola, Tommaso dai Liuti, the young Giorgio Benigno Salviati and Giovanni Gatti influenced Andreas' specula. In addition to other parts of the charterhouse, Andreas' cell was also decorated with frescoes by famous painters, including Bongiovanni da Geminiano.

Following the death of Montefortino, Andreas was elected prior of the Ferrara Charterhouse in 1469, with the consent of their patron Borso d'Este. However, by that time, Andreas was embroiled into conflict with the Carthusian leadership. According to the accusations, he brought the order into disrepute and reported certain leaders to the cardinal-protector Angelo Capranica, while revealing the secrets of the order to outsiders. Therefore, the chapter did not acknowledge Andreas' election. As early as 1467, internal conflicts were plaguing the operation of the Ferrara Charterhouse, there were even imprisonments. In 1468, the Grande Chartreuse nominated their candidate to the position but the monks went against the central will and elected Montefortino again. In the same year, the Grande Chartreuse called upon Andreas to obey. Therefore, Andreas' election as prior in 1469 was part of a resistance by some monks. In early 1470, the Grande Chartreuse dismissed him and appointed Joannes Nicolai instead.

In November 1470, Borso d'Este intervened with the cardinal-protector on behalf of Andreas. In his letter, the duke wrote that he had agreed with the election of Andreas because of his "virtues", but he was dismissed by grand prior Jean Zeewen de Roosendael "to the astonishment of himself [Borso] and the monastery". Borso petitioned to Angelo Capranica to deliver all documents which proves the innocence of Andreas, who wishes to personally clear himself before the Grande Chartreuse. In the same time, Andreas sent a letter to his old friend Geronimo Ranuzzi (Capranica's confidant), in which he writes, he struggles to reinstate his position of prior due to only obedience and Borso's insistence. Andreas expresses that he does not want the duke – to whom he owed a lot – to have his honor and reputation tarnished because of him, so he is fighting for the truth to be revealed.

=== Later life ===
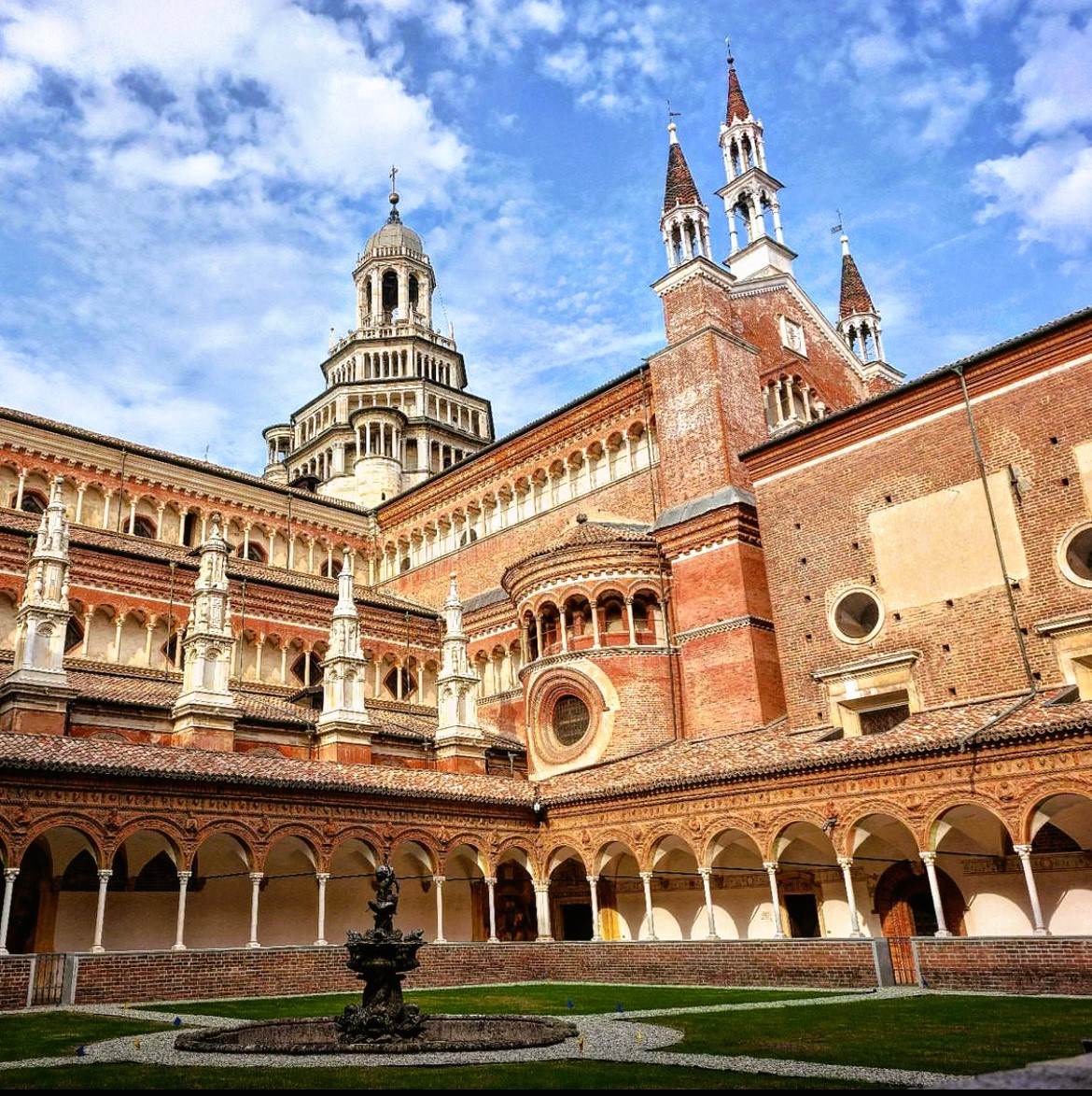
The Certosa di Pavia, where Andreas lived in "exile"

Andreas traveled to the Grande Chartreuse and successfully cleared himself of the charges in 1471. However, Borso d'Este died soon, in August of that year. In order to resolve the conflict, Andreas was transferred to the Certosa di Pavia (Santa Maria delle Grazie) with immediate effect (he did not even have the opportunity to return to Ferrara after his journey to the Chartreuse Mountains). Effectively, Andreas and his partisans were removed from Ferrara. Andreas was also forbidden from attending Borso's funeral. Andreas wrote his speculum regum to the new ruler Ercole I d'Este during his "exile" in Pavia. The portrait of Ercole on the cover was painted by Guglielmo Giraldi in Ferrara. The newly crowned Pope Sixtus IV (Francesco della Rovere) became Andreas' new parton – maybe they have known each other since Bologna, and both were committed believers in the dogma of the Immaculate Conception. In early 1472, the pope intervened with the Grande Chartreuse to allow Andreas to return Ferrara. This is the last information about Andreas' life.

Since his commentary on the Song of Songs was discovered in a library of the Santo Stefano del Bosco monastery near Vibo Valentia in Calabria, it is possible he moved to Southern Italy after Pavia. In contrast, an early 16th-century redaction of the primary Carthusian chronicle (a manuscript from the library of Grenoble) mentions the life and activity of Andreas (as the only friar beside Werner Rolevinck, who was not a general prior of the order). The text emphasizes Andreas' immersion in contemplation and theological expertise. The compilator also mentions that Andreas "died in Rome during the time of Pope Paul, in the penultimate year of his papacy [i.e. 1470]". Although the date is certainly incorrect, it is possible that Andreas left the Carthusian order at the end of his life and sought protection and patronage in the entourage of Pope Sixtus.

== Works ==
=== Expositio super Cantica canticorum ===
==== Manuscript ====
Andreas Pannonius wrote his commentary on the Song of Songs (full title: Super cantica canticorum Salomonis expositio devotissima) plausibly during his stay in Bologna in the early 1460s. Sándor Bene considered that the friar began to write the work already in Venice based on the literature there. He finished the text in Florence, where the Song of Songs and its explanations were the most current liturgical topic during that time, putting the theme of beatitudo into a new context. In the subtitle, Andreas Pannonius referred to his work as "nova compilatio"; although the text is full of quotes from earlier authors but it is not a mere compilation since the writer provides a new understanding and a new possibility of explanation.

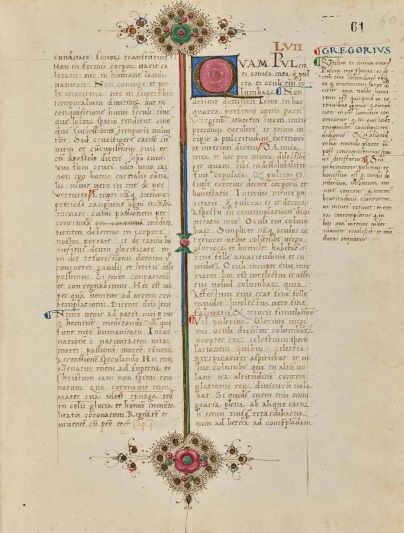
A page of Andreas Pannonius' Song of Songs commentary (OSZK Cod. Lat. 443 61r)

The only surviving copy of Andreas' work (115 folios) was copied by a Carthusian friar Augustinus in 1505–1506 within the walls of the Ferrara Charterhouse. Later, this codex was kept in the Santo Stefano del Bosco monastery near Serra San Bruno in Calabria. The single surviving copy and its good condition suggest that, if it was used, it was only in a narrow circle, in the Ferrara monastery, and rarely. There is no entry related to the commentary from anyone else outside the scriptore, and apart from the first page, which is dirtier from the first few uses, and the lost sixth folio, there is no trace of regular use. The scriptor copied the manuscript in two main columns and, as an addition, in one side column on the outer margins. The two main columns contain the text of Andreas' commentary itself, supplemented in places by a narrower and smaller font column on the outer margin, which contains excerpts from authoritative and popular authors of the Song of Songs literature. The decoration of the codex consists of red, green and blue pen-drawn, floral fleuronnée initials, gold, blue and red overpainting initials at the preface and at the beginning of the chapters of the Song of Songs, leaf margin decoration made of floral ornamentation and gold specks, and intercolumnar decorations. The binding of the codex – which contains some brief Latin and Italian notes apart from Andreas' work too – dates from the 18th century.

During the reign of Joseph Bonaparte (1806–1808), the Carthusians had to leave the Santo Stefano del Bosco monastery, and subsequently a part of the book collection was transported to Naples, but another part was destroyed and looted. In 1828, Count Vito Capialbi bought some codices, including Andreas' work, which then became part of his family's library in the nearby Monteleone (present-day Vibo Valentia). Francesco Carabellese cataloged the pieces of the private collection in the late 19th century. Hungarian scholar József Huszti discovered the description and made serious efforts to copy the text of the codex from 1925 to 1929. With the assistance of the Collegium Hungaricum Roma, the codex was copied by Italian scholars. In July 1938, when Hungarian Prime Minister Béla Imrédy visited Italy, Benito Mussolini donated the codex to the Hungarian state. It became part of the collection of the National Széchényi Library (OSZK) under Cod. Lat. 443.

József Huszti prepared the publication of the codex, and his manuscript was completed by the spring of 1940. The publication was postponed even though proofreading and page numbering had already been completed. The text edition was ultimately not published and its manuscript was lost due to the World War II. Since the 2010s, Csilla Bíró is preparing a critical edition of Andreas' commentary.

==== Content and sources ====
According to the typologies of the Song of Songs commentaries, Andreas Pannonius' work belongs to the Mariological type. He follows the concept of Rupert of Deutz – the bride is Mary as the Virgin Mary herself, not as an allegory of the church, the groom is Christ, and their wedding is the incarnation of Christ – with some restrictions. Andreas, however, did not take Rupert's theses literally. Andreas explicitly identifies only the events of the Annunciation from the Gospel of Luke with the text of the Song of Songs – he completely omits the figure of Saint Joseph and Mary's visit to Elizabeth. Although both commentaries deal with the Incarnation, but while Andreas Pannonius wrote his work in defense of the Immaculate Conception, the question does not even arise in Rupert's work. The latter topic was popular in the second half of the 15th century. The central issue of the debate was whether Mary was free from original sin at the moment of her conception. In the debate, which flared up again and again, the Franciscans and hermit orders, such as the Carthusians, represented the doctrine of the Immaculate Conception, sharing the view of Duns Scotus. As Andreas emphasizes "Mary, whose purpose in life was to bring forth the Savior, was preserved from original sin at the moment of his soul's conception". Andreas Pannonius was the first and only scholar who aimed to support the concept of the Immaculate Conception with the Song of Songs through his commentary.

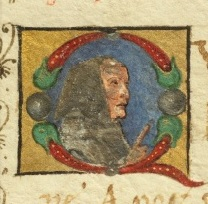
Andreas Pannonius depicted by a miniature of Expositio super Cantica canticorum, OSZK Cod. Lat. 443 5r

For this part (verse 2, Song of Songs 2), Andreas utilized the treatise of 14th-century Franciscan theologian Petrus Aureoli (Tractatus de immaculata conceptione), the structure of the two works is roughly the same (a prologue and six chapters). The Mystical Theology of Pseudo-Dionysius the Areopagite was a guiding thread of Andreas' ideas. It is also possible that a catalog of recommended readings (De libris legendis apud Carthusienses) for his contemporary Carthusian friars compiled by Jean Gerson was also a source for inspiration for Andreas. Based on this, Andreas plausibly utilized William of St-Thierry's Epistola ad fratres de Monte Dei, Bernard of Clairvaux's Sermones super Cantica canticorum (who contradicts him on almost every point), Pope Gregory the Great's Moralia in Job, Robertus de Tumbalenia's Expositio super Cantica canticorum, Richard of Saint Victor's De duodecim patriarchis and De arca mystica, Hugh of Saint Victor's De oratione, in addition to Bonaventure's Breviloquium and Itinerarium mentis in Deum. Beside the works included in the list, Andreas also used Ludolph of Saxony's Vita Christi and the tractates of Jean Gerson himself. In his prologue, Andreas used the prologues of Haimo of Auxerre's Commentarium in Cantica canticorum and Nicholas of Lyra's Postilla super Cantica canticorum.

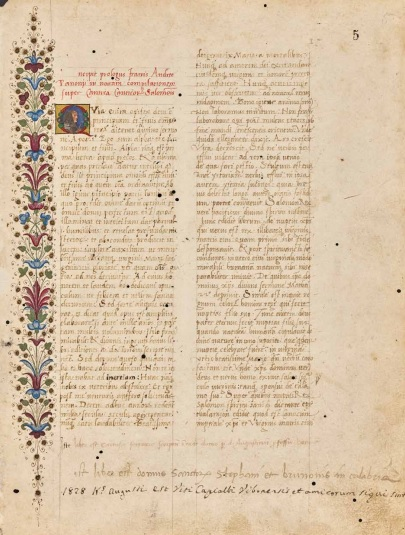
A page of Andreas Pannonius' Song of Songs commentary (OSZK Cod. Lat. 443 5r)

In addition to the medieval scholastic theologians, Andreas' commentary was affected by the ideology of Renaissance humanism which aimed to Christianize the love concept of Plato through the new interpretations of the Song of Songs. This idea centered around Marsilio Ficino and his Platonic Academy in Florence. In this context, Lorenzo Pisano's lost commentary on the Song of Songs maybe influenced Andreas' thoughts. Sándor Bene argued that the Carthusian friar, instead of representing the scholastic commentary tradition blending with mysticism (as previous literature had believed), he compiled a work that fit into the context of the most contemporary Renaissance scholarship. In Andreas' interpretation, the Song of Songs is simply about the pure, holy embrace of souls, the union of hearts, and the fusion of emotions, thus it is about love, and there is no place for any allegorical interpretation here. Sándor Bene also assumed the influence of Candiano Bollani and his commentary on the Book of Genesis. Their regular Humanist theological dialogues influenced each other's thoughts and works since Andreas' early monastic years in Venice. The influence of Petrarch (the letters of Familiares, possibly through the Bollani family in addition to monastic antecedents) on Andreas Pannonius already appears in his Expositio. In his work, he quoted or paraphrased Petrarch at least three times.

Andreas Pannonius discusses the soul's ascent to God in a complex allegorical framework. He describes the epithalamium as a mystery of the loving union of divine and human essence which results in the birth of Christ. Andreas writes that this nuptials take place in the virginal womb of Mary, from which Christ emerges as the incarnation of the Logos, without compromising her virginity. Andreas connects this thesis to the Trinity doctrine; "the human essence is united with the person of the Son in the womb of the glorious Virgin". Andreas followed the concept of Nicholas of Lyra regarding this section. According to Andreas, the primary meaning (the betrothal and nuptials of Mary and Christ) is told through mutually incompatible metaphors (a kind of "double literal sense"), which make the literal interpretation (early Jews) and the traditional allegorical interpretation (Judaism and Scholastics) of the Song of Songs untenable.

In his commentary, Andreas also seeks to find the way and how to achieve beatitude based on motifs determined by Origen. He advocates the principle of mandatory gradualism. He regards the law as a necessary tool for achieving beatitude. Human law leads to political beatitude, which is a peaceful and tranquil state in this temporal life, but the path to eternal beatitude is shown by the divine law. These ideas form a part of Andreas' mystical theology. Unlike his contemporary Denis the Carthusian, Andreas believes that the divine essence (caritas, the beatitude which connects humans to God) cannot be reached, it can only be reached to its limits. The author considers "love pacifies the heart, elevates the mind through divine and heavenly things, and inseparably connects it to God the Creator". Andreas develops an individual ascension model, the essence of which is contemplation. The soul must overcome repentance and solitude, and then, by perfecting purity, it can reach the highest level of contemplation. For Andreas, the right way of life and result of a moral decision become decisive instead of forcing a mystical experience. Petrarch' De vita solitaria again appears in his argument, demonstrating the ideal of contemplative life which leads to the third, highest form of caritas.

=== Libellus de virtutibus Matthiae Corvino dedicatus ===
==== Manuscript ====
Also titled as De regiis virtutibus ad Matthiam Hungariae regem, Andreas Pannonius finished his mirror for princes (speculum regum) for Matthias Corvinus, King of Hungary on 1 September 1467, when he was already vicar in Ferrara. The contemporary autograph is kept in the Vatican Library under accession number Cod. Vat. Lat. 3186. The manuscript, a red membrane codex, consists of 107 folios (21x14 cm) each of them is filled with 25 lines of writing. The handwriting is in Humanist Italian-style.

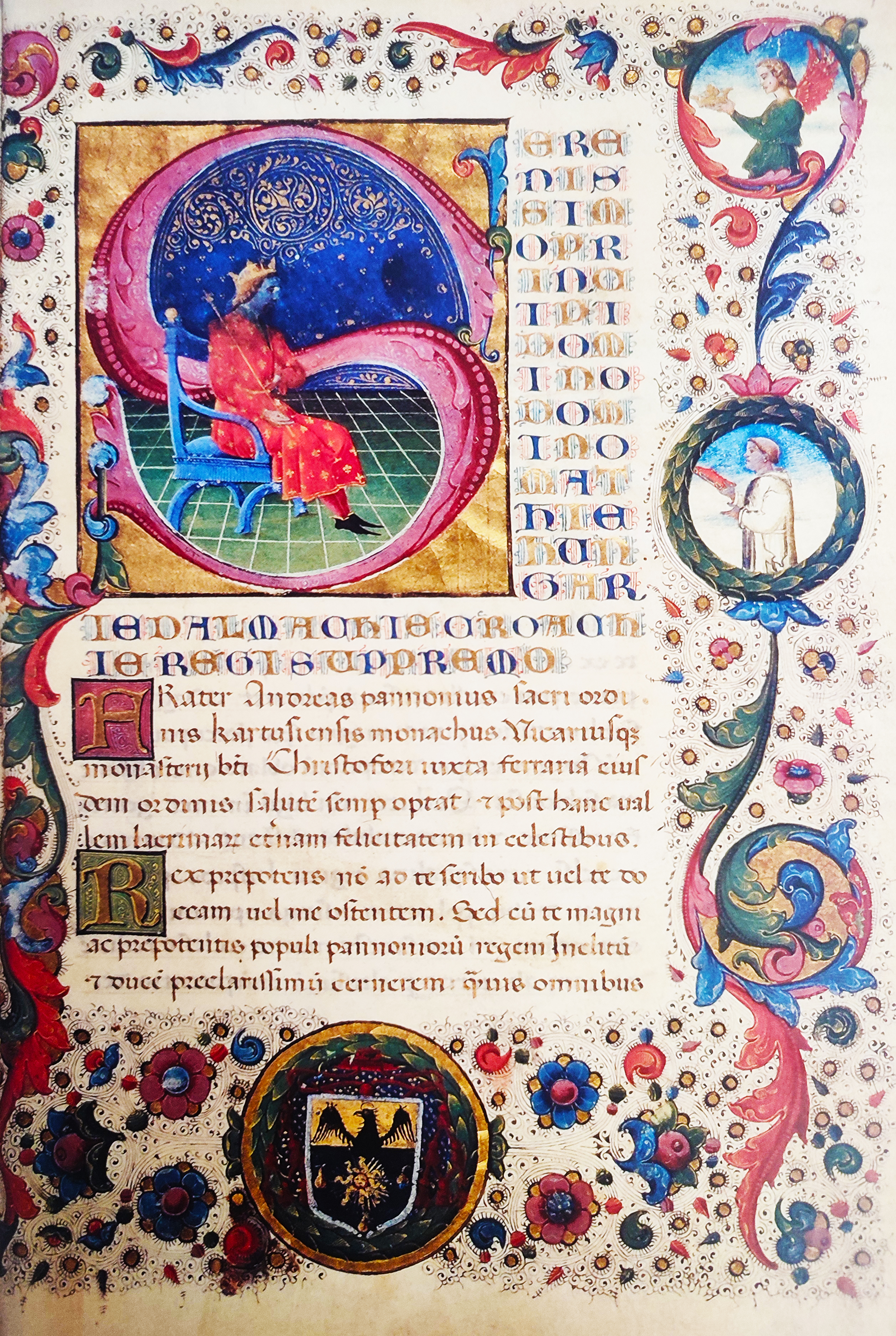
Front page of Andreas Pannonius' De regiis virtutibus ad Matthiam Hungariae regem (Cod. Vat. Lat. 3186 1r)

Its cover (1 recto) is highly decorated: all four sides are surrounded by flowers and leaves. On the right edge there are miniatures in two medallions. The top miniature depicts an angel wearing a green robe and holding a crown. The lower miniature depicts a Carthusian monk with gentle features, the author himself, Andreas Pannonius, holding a book bound in red leather (i.e. the work itself). The central initial "S" on the cover depicts Matthias Corvinus, the angel and the monk both extend the crown and the work towards him, respectively. The depiction of Matthias is very different from the images created by his contemporaries and those created in the king's environment: it is clear that the illustrator was not familiar with the king's appearance, so he used his imagination to depict a ruler similar to Italian princely figures (e.g. clothing). Most of the art historians – e.g. Ilona Berkovits, Konrad Oberhuber and Dániel Pócs – identified the illustrator with Early renaissance manuscript illuminator Guglielmo Giraldi, who was active in Ferrara in those years. Outside the cover, Andreas' work is decorated with only a few initials. Another folio (60 verso) depicts a divina iustitia miniature in initial "A".

Andreas' mirror of prince is considered one of the earliest corvinae, i.e. it was once part of the collection of the Bibliotheca Corviniana, Matthias' renowned Renaissance-era library in Buda, the capital of the Kingdom of Hungary. It is possible that Hungarian cleric and diplomat Nicholas Nyújtódi (the bishop of knin), who left Rome for Hungary through Ferrara in 1467, brought the codex from Ferrara to deliver it to his king. In his text, Andreas recommended Nyújtódi, in addition to Janus Pannonius, the bishop of Pécs and Benedict Lövői, the bishop of Bosnia, as the readers of the work. Andreas also named the intermediary for the transmission of the codex, a certain "Marchus", a magister and clarus philosophus. Scholars identified this person with Italian humanist Galeotto Marzio. Originally, the bottom of the cover depicted Matthias' coat of arms featuring the raven with a ring, symbol of the Hunyadi family. Later this was scraped off and replaced with the coat of arms of French cardinal Raymund Pérault, who was Bishop of Gurk (in the Duchy of Carinthia) until his death in 1505. It is possible, Pérault bought or "borrowed" the codex after the death of Matthias in 1490, and took it with him to Rome, where it later became part of the Vatican Library. The existence of codex was discovered by Vilmos Fraknói in the 1870s, through Bernard de Montfaucon's Bibliotheca bibliothecarum. His colleague Jenő Ábel copied it when he was in Rome for research in 1879. Fraknói published the Latin text in 1886. It was translated into Hungarian by Iván Boronkai in 1984.

==== Content and sources ====
Andreas Pannonius' De regiis virtutibus consists of 37 chapters. The 1–27th chapters are organized around the virtues of rulers according to the definition of the genre, in the following order: Andreas – in the footsteps of Saint Paul – explains the importance of faith in the 1st chapter. Thereafter, he discusses unbelief, breach of faith, and in this regard, oaths in the 2nd chapter. Exhorting Matthias to conscientiously keep his oath, he refers to the violation of the Peace of Szeged and the subsequent defeat at Varna, where he lists George Pongrác of Dengeleg and Gregory Bethlen among the dead. Andreas' personal involvement and lasting pain over what happened is palpable. The author speaks of hope (3rd chapter) and charity (4th chapter). Andreas writes that the one who possesses the greatest measure of the virtue of love (or charity) is the one who sacrifices himself for his friends, and he emphasizes that this measure of love was present in John Hunyadi (Matthias' father), who so often risked his life for his homeland. These first four chapters cover the general theological virtues (faith, hope, charity), the conditions of religious life and the guarantees of heavenly beatitude.

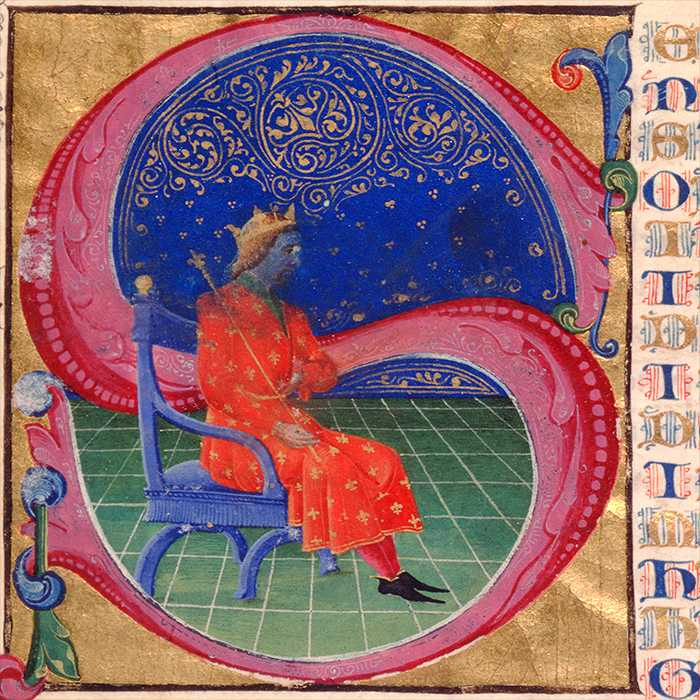
Matthias Corvinus depicted in a miniature of the front page of Andreas' De regiis virtutibus, illustrated by Guglielmo Giraldi (Cod. Vat. Lat. 3186, 1r)

The 5–27 chapters contain the criteria for political beatitude, the moral and political aspects of the cardinal virtues. Andreas Pannonius discusses the good governance of the state within a theological framework. The political beatitude (cardinal virtues) of the monarch affects the satisfaction of subjects, peace and security of the state, which also leads to the divine heights (fruitio Dei). Andreas lists prudence (or wisdom), courage and justice (5–6th chapters). Regarding temperance (7th chapter), Andreas warns Matthias that the victories of the holy kings of Hungary, according to the testimony of history chronicles, were often preceded by fasting and prayer. Here he refers again to Hunyadi. He presents the sins of drunkenness and lust as the opposites of the virtue of temperance (8–9th chapters). Andreas briefly speaks of marriage and virginity too. He advises the king to live a pure life and recommends Borso d'Este as a model, as a prince with a virtuous and holy life. He then mentions the virtues of generosity, which Matthias has no shortage of, and truthfulness (10–14th chapters). Regarding courage or bravery, Andreas quotes a poet as saying about the Hungarians: "These are open and not deceitful people, who seek to defeat the enemy with valor, not cunning." Based on Aristotle, the Carthusian friar lists the seven types of courage. Andreas discusses wars and the reasons that justify war according to the Scripture, in addition to the qualities of military leaders. He encourages Matthias to go to war with a pure soul and strong faith. Accordingly, Matthias ascended the Hungarian throne through "divine election" following the execution of his brother. "All of Christendom has chosen you [Mathias] as its leader in the fight against the Turkish emperor and the Mohammedans; you, in turn, have chosen the Lord Jesus Christ as your heavenly commander, and his angels as your standard bearers; in your camp, set up the standard marked with the holy cross, and turn to it with reverence." Andreas urges that praying monks, especially Carthusians, be present during the campaigns. He also talks about why God allows Muslims to triumph over Christians (15–17th chapters). He places military knowledge at the top of the list of military commander's attributes, recommending that Matthias study Greek and Roman military works. He then encourages him to acquire generosity, gentleness, and piety (18–20th chapters). Regarding Iustitia or justice, Andreas actively speaks against tyrannical arbitrariness. Vilmos Fraknói considered that Andreas perhaps was aware of Matthias' inclination in this direction (from the second half of the 1460s, criticisms of him from humanist advisors increased). He warns against arrogance, pride, wrath and revenge (21–24th chapters). He encourages the king to listen to wise advisors: he mentions John Vitéz and Stephen Várdai by name to whose praise he dedicates separate chapters in his work since he knew both of them personally (25–26th chapters). This section concludes with a brief discussion of peace.

The third section of Andreas' De regiis virtutibus (28–37th chapters) is a discussion of the "ultimate things" that a monarch must contemplate in order to achieve the moral perfection and beatitude required by the great task. Andreas explains Death, Purgatory, Hell and Paradise, the coming and destruction of the Antichrist, the Last Judgment and related theological concepts. At the end of the work, Andreas summarizes his message to Matthias: "be God-fearing, gentle, merciful, courageous, pure, just, generous and noble-minded, so that you may be found worthy of the imperial dignity in every respect!" besides the fact that the Carthusian monk here clearly refers to Matthias's ambition to obtain the title of Holy Roman Emperor, his remark also reflects an anti-papal branch of the pseudo-Joachimite traditions ("iustus et pius imperator"). Andreas' work never mentions the role of popes and the clergy. Andreas presents holy kings Stephen and Ladislaus as examples for Matthias to follow, in addition to his father John Hunyadi, who "prayed night and day, and afflicted himself with fasting and other practices of self-denial."

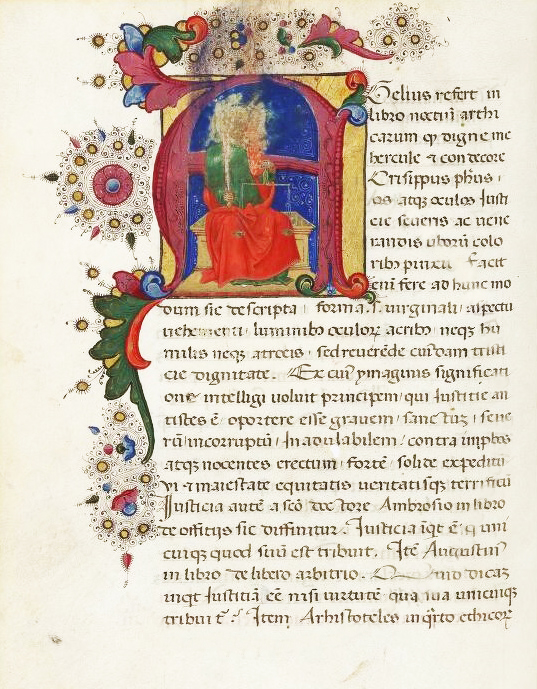
A miniature depicts Iustitia in Andreas Pannonius' De regiis virtutibus ad Matthiam Hungariae regem (Cod. Vat. Lat. 3186 60v)

Andreas' work draws heavily on mystical traditions. He definitely utilized the work of Bernard of Clairvaux who psychologized the doctrine of virtues, considering them as emotions given by divine grace, and linked the four cardinal virtues to the four basic emotional states: love, joy, fear, sadness. Experiencing and directing these turns into virtues or vices, as this concept appears in Andreas' work (contrary to the interpretation of the Stoic tradition). Andreas' work represents the contact between Franciscan, Dominican and mystical-devotional thought. Andreas' main source of inspiration was Giles of Rome's De regimine principum, who attempted to harmonize the teachings of Thomas Aquinas (intellectualism) and Duns Scotus (voluntarism). Accordingly, the two virtues of a prince's political beatitude are wisdom (prudentia) and love (caritas). Andreas writes that the goal of political governance is the peace of the state and the tranquility of the subjects, which the ruler can achieve based on these two main virtues. Andreas borrowed several chapters verbatim from Giles' work, especially regarding the exposition of the various types of justice. For the explanation of caritas, Andreas used the texts of Giles to argue against Thomas's assertions. In addition to represent Giles' concordist views through the influence of the aforementioned Platonic Academy, Andreas embedded the central, political philosophical unit of the work in a theological framework to resolve the monarch' spiritual beatitude (since Giles provided only a philosophical explanation omitting the theological one). In order to fulfill this effort, Andreas highly utilized the De proprietatibus rerum written by Franciscan friar Bartholomaeus Anglicus, following the Franciscan and Platonic theological patterns.

Aside from Dominican (Thomas Aquinas) and Franciscan (Bartholomaeus Anglicus) traditions, Andreas Pannonius also turned to the mystical-devotional thought. Andreas' work brings the person of the secular ruler closer to the sphere of holiness, complementing the cardinal virtues with the virtues of faith (unlike his contemporary Denis the Carthusian), which was a rare procedure at the time. The soul of the monarch is given special importance regarding the subject of beatitude. For this purpose, Andreas used Michael the Carthusian of Prague's De quatuor virtutibus cardinalibus pro eruditione principum, taking over from him the grouping of virtues. He possibly knew De virtutibus moralibus et theologicis by Venetian philosopher Giovanni Caldiera, who also connected the transcendent beatitude of the individual with the well-being of the state, "political beatitude". The direct influence of the monastic order (Carthusian mysticism) was more important than Humanist thought in Andreas' mirror for princes. For instance, he used Columba. Tractatus asceticus written by Giovanni, a Carthusian friar from Venice, and Lorenzo Giustiniani's Lignum vitae; both works incorporated the cardinal virtues into their discussion of the three virtues of faith. Andreas also wants to provide a theological explanation of "ultimate things" and emphasizes that he tries to keep his distance from extremes, referring to Richard the Sophister (and Occamism) and Duns Scotus. Andreas expanded his text with the narrations of Martin of Braga's De quattuor virtutibus. By including contemplation as the path to monarchical beatitude, Andreas represented the Carthusian orientation. For this, his model was Jean Gerson's mirror of prince dedicated for Louis, Duke of Guyenne (the son of Charles VI of France). Andreas uniquely gives a political function to meditation and contemplation. Consequently, Matthias can only be suitable for defending Christian Europe if his meditation is sufficiently deep and experienced, which also leads to his personal spiritual and devotional beatitude (fruitio Dei). There, Andreas adopted elements from Gerard van Vliederhoven's Cordiale quattuor novissimorum, an influential teaching of the Devotio Moderna.

In addition, there are 27 quotes from Petrarch's works in De regiis virtutibus (seven from De otio religioso, nineteen from Seniles and one from De viris illustribus). Andreas quotes at length Petrarch's letter to Luchino Dal Verme regarding qualities of an ideal military general and causes of wars (Seniles IV.1), inserted in collections of quotations from medieval authors (for instance, Augustine of Hippo's De civitate Dei, the Gesta Romanorum, Ramon Llull's Ars, Bernard of Clairvaux's sermons on the Blessed Virgin Mary and the letter of Pope Alexander IV to the Carthusians). Andreas often re-arranges Petrarch's sentences, supplementing them with specific examples related to Hungary. He includes John Hunyadi among the greatest generals of history listed by Petrarch. Andreas found a literary sample for the joint glorification of father and son (Hunyadi and Matthias) in Petrarch's letter to Francesco I da Carrara. Andreas adopted the quote from Cicero through Petrarch regarding the love and goodwill of citizens as the supreme protection of the ruler. Andreas was inspired by the poet's requirement of caritas-centered politicization, the hoped-for consequence of which is the peace of the state. Based on Petrarch, Andreas Pannonius considered the genre of his mirror of prince dedicated to Matthias as a rhetoric epistolarum (collection of letters). According to Sándor Bene, his work marks an era boundary balancing between Thomist intellectualism and Scotist voluntarism, adopting the structural scheme of Giles of Rome which is varied with Petrarch's letters, which are considered the first Humanist mirror of prince.

==== Hungarian phrases ====
Hungarian phrases and sentences
Location	Text	Present-day orthography	Interpretation
Prologue	"nemabarath"	"néma barát"	lit. "silent friar", the phrase refers to the Carthusians
16. cap.	"Nemabarath scerzeth"	"Néma barát szerzete"	lit. "order of silent friars", the phrase refers to the Carthusians
29. cap.	"Michepen meghal a nagij wr, azoncheppen meghal az scegen ember"	"Miképpen meghal a nagyúr, azonképpen meghal a szegény ember"	lit. "As the lord dies, so the poor man dies", Andreas Pannonius refers to the sentence as a Hungarian ("Pannonian") proverb. It is possible that it is the author's own invention; the Latin and Italian versions were quite common in Italy at the time. Andreas possibly borrowed the proverb from Dutch theologian Gerard van Vliederhoven's Cordiale quattuor novissimorum.
31. cap.	"lidrez hewnach"	"lidérc árnyak"	Andreas writes that evil spirits, whom they commonly call incubi and in the language of the Pannonians (i.e. Hungarians) "lidrez hewnach", often appear to wicked women and desired and carried out their sexual intercourse, etc.

=== Libellus de virtutibus Herculi Estensi dedicatus ===
==== Manuscript ====
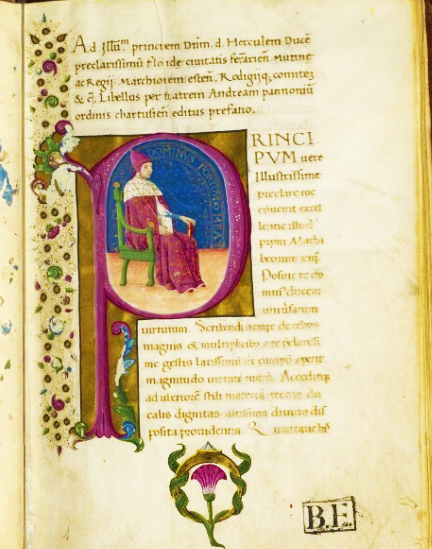
Front page of Andreas Pannonius' Libellus de virtutibus Herculi Estensi dedicatus (Lat. 108, α.Q.9.12 1r)

Andreas Pannonius wrote his final known work during his "exile" in Pavia, in the second half of 1471. He dedicated his speculum regum to the new duke Ercole I d'Este, half-brother and successor of Borso d'Este, Andreas' most influential patron. Its full title is Ad illustrissimum principem dominum dominum Herculem, ducem preclarissimum floride civitatis Ferrariensis, Mutine ac Regii, marchionem Estensem, Rodigiique comitem etc. libellus per fratrem Andream Pannonium ordinis Chartusiensis editus.

Its only known manuscript is located in the Biblioteca Estense (Lat. 108, α.Q.9.12) in Modena. The red membrane codex consists of 116 folios (20x14 cm) each of them is filled with 24 lines of writing. The handwriting is in angular Gothic letters, which was typical of works compiled in monasteries in the second half of the 15th century. The title page is ornately displayed, a flower garland runs along its left side. Flowers are also painted on the lower edge. The capital initial of the dedication ("P") depicts a figure of a prince (undoubtedly Ercole) dressed in purple, with the following inscription: "Dominus fortitudo mea." The illumination was painted by Guglielmo Giraldi, which indicates that Andreas was able to maintain his connections in Ferrara even after his "exile". This manuscript is probably an autograph that the author offered to the prince, whose library the work was then included in.

The manuscript was discovered by Vilmos Fraknói in 1878. He published its Latin text in 1886. There are no Hungarian or Italian translations yet.

==== Content and sources ====
The Ad Herculem consists of 43 chapters. In comparison to his mirror for prince dedicated to Matthias Corvinus, Andreas Pannonius' work dedicated to Ercole has a much more Humanist literary character; the first section of the writing (1–3rd chapters) contains the glorification of the House of Este narrating its origin, rising and Ercole's accession to the throne, in this section, classical antique references increase compared to his previous works. Andreas also mentions the previous connections between the family and Hungary, for instance, the marriage of Andrew II of Hungary and Beatrice d'Este. The friar incorrectly claims that their son Stephen the Posthumous ascended the Hungarian throne after the death of Béla IV, confusing his person with Stephen V. In discussing the virtues of a ruler, Andreas drew heavily from his previous work, adopting the division of the chapters. 22 of the 43 chapters can also be found in the mirror of prince dedicated to Matthias, however, Andreas makes numerous stylistic changes (abbreviations, expansions, omissions, insertions). In addition, the Ad Herculem differs from the previous work in its fundamental philosophical and theological concept, so it is clearly a new work and not a recycling of the previous one. Andreas divided his work into two books. The second one (a letter of consolation or epistola consolatoria), titled Super decessu divi Borsii ducis, reflects on the death of Borso d'Este, dealing with the soul, and primarily with what happens to the soul after death.

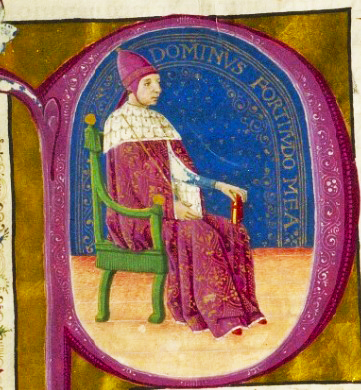
Ercole I d'Este depicted in a miniature of the front page of Andreas' Ad Herculem, illustrated by Guglielmo Giraldi (Lat. 108, α.Q.9.12, 1r)

Andreas' primary goal is to prove that the political virtues of a prince are sufficient in themselves to achieve eternal beatitude, and that salvation can also be achieved through good politics. This is the largest difference from the previous position, when contemplation and meditation were essential for this. In line with this, the work is much more realpolitik. Regarding the conquer of Jerusalem, Andreas omits the eschatological interpretation, and encourages Ercole with the example of great generals Godfrey of Bouillon and Scipio Africanus. He also refers to the De civitate Dei as Celestis civitas, making a difference between political and theological concepts. The goal remains a holy war against the Ottoman Empire, but from a realpolitik, diplomatic approach: instead of the praying Carthusian monks, he now recommends to Ercole the alliance of Venice, Hungary, and Pope Sixtus IV. Andreas' work describes and glorifies the military exploits of Ercole (27–28th chapters). He urges the start of a campaign against the Turks, who have caused much damage to Christianity (32–33th chapters). He lists the aforementioned powers whose support he can count on (34–36th chapters). At the end of his book, Andreas devotes another chapter (43th chapter) to the war to be launched against the Turks, opening up to Ercole the horizon of glorious military feats and great conquests, ensuring that the path to the interior of Asia is open to him, that he can take Jerusalem under his control, and at the same time, with his victorious campaign, he can open the gates of the land of eternal glory, the kingdom of heaven.

Andreas attempts to theologically outline the relationship between political virtues and beatitude, following the afterlife journey of the deceased Borso's soul in the aforementioned second part of his work. Political virtues become equal to the virtues of contemplative lifestyles, abandoning the principle of gradualism shared by humanists and previously himself. Consequently, with both sets of virtues, ultimate and eternal beatitude is possible. According to Sándor Bene, Andreas left his former Thomist and Aristotelian ideas and turned to Platonism. The 13th-century Hugh Ripelin of Strasburg's Compendium theologiae influenced his thesis, regarding the hierarchy system of virtues. Andreas corresponds the nine orders of Beatitudes to the political virtues of the late Borso, for whom the kingdom of heaven thus awaits. Andreas also used the De spiritu et anima compiled by a pseudo-Augustine author (possibly Alcher of Clairvaux), who believes that the soul retains all its faculties even in its state of anima separata, separated from the body, which Thomas Aquinas sharply disputed. With this, Andreas also took a stand on the current theological issues of his time, namely the question of the primacy of will and reason, and the abilities found in the anima separata, which became an important theme of the developing Platonism, and it was the De spiritu et anima that helped him find an original solution to the political contexts of the philosophy of the soul. Sándor Bene argued, Andreas knew the De spiritu et anima only indirectly through the encyclopedia of Bartholomaeus Anglicus. As a result of his Andreas' new (anti-Thomist) concept, which calls the will the noblest and most perfect faculty of the soul, the Ad Herculem is full of quotes and interpretations from Duns Scotus (voluntas). By 1471, Andreas, becoming a Scotist, completely omits the mystical-devotional parts containing meditation, which he had still explained in his previous work written in 1467. The catalogue of virtues remains, but their theological explanation and basis undergo a shift in emphasis.

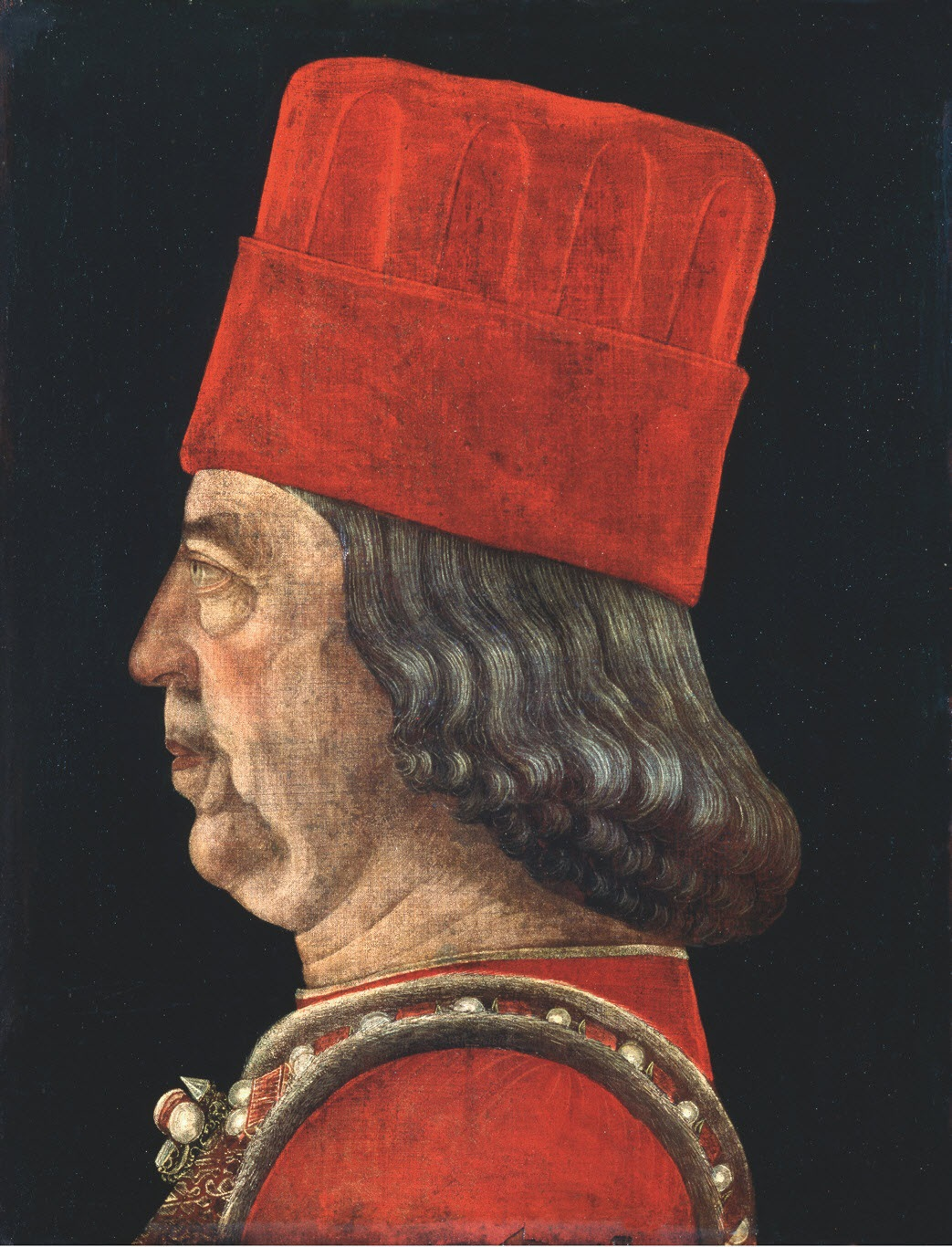
Portrait of Borso d'Este, painted by Baldassare Estense

In order to develop his new concept, Andreas used a commentary of Peter of Aquila (also known as Scotellus) on the four books of Sentences; a codex of that is held in the Biblioteca Comunale Ariostea in Ferrara, which Andreas Pannonius had sold to theologian Giovanni Battista Panetti through the mediation of its illuminator Guglielmo Giraldi in February 1470. The structure of the Super decessu divi Borsii ducis is completely based on Scotellus' commentary, but excerpts from that can also be found in the catalog of virtues of the princely mirror intended for Ercole. However, Andreas does not adopt Scotellus' view that moral virtues can exist independently, without theological virtues, thus he stops at the "border" that leads to the secular modernist position. Andreas' work is permeated by political theory works written in Ferrara's intellectual sphere of influence (e.g. Michele Savonarola, Tommaso dai Liuti and Bornio da Sala), which pay particular attention to the political dimensions of theology and are characterized by genre eclecticism. There are literal correspondences between both of Andreas' mirrors for princes and Bornio da Sala's De principe; it is likely that the two authors influenced each other through active correspondence.

In the second half of the 1460s, Andreas Pannonius gradually came under the intellectual influence of Petrarch. His mirror for prince dedicated to Ercole contains several quotes from Petrarch's works. He again utilized De otio religioso (three quotes) and Seniles (ten), but, since 1467, he also discovered other works from the poet: Invective contra medicum, Secretum, De gestis Cesaris (each one) and three biographies from the De viris illustribus (Alexander the Great, Scipio Africanus and Hannibal; altogether ten quotes). With these, the author glorifies Ercole using humanistic means. In addition, Andreas quotes twenty times from fourteen letters of the Epistolae familiares, mostly from two letters written to Marco Portonario, Petrarch's young correspondent from Genoa, who wished to become a cleric, but had been forced by his parents to study law. Petrarch comforts his friend by writing that the political virtues make it possible to practice the vita activa so as to find salvation and join the blessed, the beati. The young and radical Petrarch had a great influence on Andreas' political thought, which thus had a decisive influence on the change in the concept of Ad Herculem. Sándor Bene considered that Andreas Pannonius subsequently searched for a philosophical tradition for this idea that theologically justified Petrarch's position. He found this in Scotism through Peter of Aquila's commentary.

=== Lost works ===
1. De ordinibus ecclesiasticis libellus – its title appears in a list of books compiled at the turn of the 16–17th centuries in the Vatican Library. The work was a commentary of the Corpus Dionysiacum. The author is referred to as "Andreas Cartusianus".
2. Super quartum Sententiarum – a commentary on Peter Lombard's Sentences. This work is listed by the necrology (annals) of the Certosa di Bologna and the manuscript from Grenoble. Andreas later reused some of its parts in his speculum regum dedicated to Matthias Corvinus.
3. Paraphrasis in psalterium – a commentary on the Book of Psalms. This work is listed by the necrology of the Certosa di Bologna and the manuscript from Grenoble.
4. Tractatus de spiritu sancto – a treatise on the Holy Spirit. This work is listed by the necrology of the Certosa di Bologna and the manuscript from Grenoble. It is possible that Andreas utilized its text regarding the narration of the Trinity in his commentary on the Song of Songs. Andreas perhaps analyzed Filioque, a major theme of the Council of Florence, based on Augustine of Hippo's De Trinitate.
5. Varii sermones – also called Sermones quamplures, the existence of these written sermons is mentioned by the necrology of the Certosa di Bologna and the manuscript from Grenoble.
6. Res gestae virtutesque praeclarae divi Borsii Ducis – an encomiastic account of the reign of his patron Borso d'Este, it was written during his stay in Ferrara sometime between 1466 and 1470. Andreas himself mentioned this work in speculum regum dedicated to Ercole I d'Este. According to his own words, he was unable to finish the work due to his forced departure, but he hopes that if his fate is resolved by the duke's grace, he will be able to finish it.

== Legacy ==
The scientific treatment of Andreas Pannonius' life and work began at the end of the 19th century, when Vilmos Fraknói published his two mirrors for princes in the original Latin language in 1886. Fraknói stated that Andreas' works represent a transition between scholastic science and the Renaissance. His dogmatic expositions and moral teachings are influenced by the old scholastic traditions of the Carthusian order. On the other hand, his historical narratives and political digressions bear the character of Humanism. József Huszti (1939), who discovered Andreas' commentary on the Song of Songs, considered that the Carthusian friar "has a worthy place in the history of Hungarian and international Christian humanism".

In contrast, literary historian János Horváth, Jr. (1942) classified his works under scholastic traditions, which are permeated by "mystical correlate". Although this did not constitute a value judgment for Horváth, it was this opinion that "exiled" Andreas from the perspective of researchers of Hungarian Renaissance literature for a long time. Hungarian literary historian Tibor Klaniczay (1964) argued that Andreas Pannonius was the first author of medieval Hungarian theological literature who also created something noteworthy for international theological literature. However, as Klaniczay noted, it was too late by then, "the time for medieval theology had passed, and its criticism and destruction, not its development, was now on the agenda." Klaniczay considered Andreas' works are "scholastic" and "theological treatises". Italian historian Raoul Manselli (1975) argued that Andreas' works are profoundly medieval, lacking any novelty or originality, and his quotations from classical authors are merely superficial embellishments. As a result of these evaluations, Andreas' works found themselves in a real scholarly no-man's land in terms of reception since the mid-20th century: medieval scholars have no longer dealt with him, and Renaissance scholars have not yet. When the mirror for prince dedicated to Matthias Corvinus was translated into Hungarian in 1984, the work was included in an anthology of medieval texts. Zoltán Frenyó analyzed that Andreas Pannonius is not discussed at all in works on the history of Hungarian philosophy, regarding any direction or era of the Hungarian philosophical literature. Only Ince Dám dedicated a chapter to Andreas Pannonius when he published his monograph on the history of the Immaculate Conception in Hungary in 1956.

The "rediscovery" of Andreas Pannonius began at the end of the 20th century. Mária Róza Dellamartina (1996) wrote his doctoral thesis on the influence of Bernard of Clairvaux's Sermones super Cantica Canticorum on Andreas Pannonius and Gregorius Coelius Pannonius. Csilla Bíró and Sándor Bene simultaneously began to strive for a more comprehensive understanding of the monk since the 2000s. Critical editions of all three works are in preparation. Béla Kiss (2005) examined the relationship between philosophy of the soul and politics in Ad Herculem, while Zoltán Frenyó (2007) analyzed the Augustinianism of Andreas Pannonius. Art historian Dániel Pócs (2008) identified Guglielmo Giraldi as the illustrator of Andreas' two mirrors for princes.

Sándor Bene, who published the first monograph on Andreas in 2023, argued that Andreas Pannonius was "medieval Renaissance" writer, who, however, cannot be considered a Humanist since he was not a poet, rhetorician, historian or philologist, but his work belongs to a new cultural paradigm moving away from Scholasticism. He was among those monks who responded to the change in style of Humanism, adopting certain forms, but at the same time remaining steadfastly faithful to their faith. While earlier Hungarian scholars – József Huszti and Tibor Kardos – attributed the "Hungarian Quattrocento" and the beginning of Humanism to the influence of Petrarch via Giovanni Conversini and Pier Paolo Vergerio the Elder to John Vitéz and Janus Pannonius (which could also affect Andreas Pannonius' "classification"), however the early humanists from Italy (Guarino da Verona) did not take on Petrarch's intellectual legacy for nearly a century in Italy, thus Vergerio, who stayed in Hungary until his death, could not spread the influence of Petrarch in his new homeland. Consequently, the Hungarian scholarship omitted Petrarch from the narration of Hungarian Humanism since the 1960s. Andreas Pannonius falls outside this circle and embodies in one person the processing of Petrarch that was carried out in other regions (Germany and Central Europe) over two or three generations. He was present in Pavia, when Rodolphus Agricola "rediscovered" Petrarch for Europe (outside Italy) in the 1460s. Andreas' works constitutes an unknown early chapter of the new Petrarch cult, surpassing the humanists in this respect in both Italy and Hungary.

== Sources ==
- Bene, Sándor (2023). Egy reneszánsz magyar író: Andreas Pannonius [A Hungarian Renaissance Author: Andreas Pannonius] (in Hungarian). Károli Gáspár Református Egyetem – L'Harmattan Kiadó. ISBN 978-963-646-101-0.
- Bíró, Csilla (2024). "Andreas Pannonius és az Énekek énekéhez írt kommentárja [Andreas Pannonius and His Commentary on the Song of Songs]". In Bíró, Csilla; Klima, Gyula; Nagy, József (eds.). Magyar keresztény gondolkodók az Árpád-kortól napjainkig (in Hungarian). Magyarságkutató Intézet. pp. 65–90. ISBN 978-615-6117-75-5.
- Dám, Ince (1956). "Andreas Pannonius ferrarai priorságának viszontagságai [The Circumstances of the Ferrara Priorship of Andreas Pannonius]". Civitas dei (in Hungarian). 1: 101–110.
- Fraknói, Vilmos (1886). "Andreas Pannonius élete és munkái [The Life and Works of Andreas Pannonius]". In Fraknói, Vilmos; Ábel, Jenő (eds.). Két magyarországi egyházi író a XV. századból: Andreas Pannonius, Nicolaus de Mirabilibus (in Hungarian and Latin). Irodalomtörténeti emlékek 1., Hungarian Academy of Sciences Literary History Committee. pp. v–xxii, 1–287.
- Frenyó, Zoltán (2007). "Andreas Pannonius augusztinizmusa. A De civitate Dei eszméi Andreas Pannonius Libellus de virtutibus című művében [The Augustinianism of Andreas Pannonius. The Ideas of The City of God in Andreas Pannonius' Libellus de virtutibus]". In Havas, László; Tegyey, Imre (eds.). Classica–Mediaevalia–Neolatina II (in Hungarian). Debreceni Egyetem Bölcsészettudományi Kar, Klasszika-filológiai Tanszék. pp. 151–167. ISBN 978-963-473-076-7.
- Haraszti Szabó, Péter; Kelényi, Borbála (2019). Magyarországi diákok francia, angol, itáliai és német egyetemeken a középkorban, 1100–1526 [Students from Hungary at the Universities of France, England, Italy and Germany in the Middle Ages 1100–1526] (in Hungarian). ELTE Egyetemi Könyvtár és Levéltár; MTA ELTE Egyetemtörténeti Kutatócsoport. ISBN 978-963-489-098-0.
- Horváth, Jr., János (1942). "Andreas Pannonius Cantica canticorum kommentárjának forrásai [Sources of Andreas Pannounius' Commentary on Cantica canticorum]". Egyetemes Philologiai Közlöny (in Hungarian). 66: 257–287.
- Huszti, József (1939). "Andreae Pannonii Expositio super Cantica canticorum". Magyar Könyvszemle (in Hungarian). 63 (2): 97–104. ISSN 0025-0171.
- Kiss, Béla (2005). "Lélekfilozófia és politika (Andreas Pannonius forrásaihoz) [Philosophy of the Soul and Politics (to the Sources of Andreas Pannonius)]" (PDF).
- Pásztor, Edit (1961). "ANDREA Pannonio". Dizionario Biografico degli Italiani (in Italian). Vol. 3. pp. 109–110. ISBN 9788812000326.
- Pócs, Dániel (2008). "Andreas Pannonius Mátyás királynak ajánlott királytükre [Mirror for Princes by Andreas Pannonius, Dedicated to Matthias Corvinus]". In Farbaky, Péter; Spekner, Enikő; Szende, Katalin (eds.). Hunyadi Mátyás, a király: hagyomány és megújulás a királyi udvarban 1458–1490. Kiállítási katalógus. Budapest Történeti Múzeum, 2008. március 19 – június 30 (in Hungarian). Budapest Történeti Múzeum. pp. 486–488. ISBN 978-963-9340-68-8.
- Révész, Mária (1935). "Andreas Pannonius és Bornio da Sala [Andreas Pannonius and Bornio da Sala]". Egyetemes Philologiai Közlöny (in Hungarian). 59: 79–81.
