= Graham David Smith =

British artist and writer (1937–2021)

Graham David Smith (1937–2021) was a British artist and writer. He also worked in the USA under the name Paul Cline.

== Biography ==
Born in the East End, Smith attended Walthamstow College of Art where in 1956 he met and became the lover of Eric Hebborn, who was to become a notorious art forger. Smith moved on to the Royal College of Art and Hebborn to the Royal Academy, but the couple stayed together for the next 13 years.

Upon Hebborn's return from a two-year stay in Italy after winning the Academy's Prix-de-Rome, the couple lived together in the run-down Cumberland Hotel in Highbury. They set up business buying and selling art, and spent many hours scouring junk shops for bargains. They befriended Marie Gray, who owned a shop near Leicester Square, and it was at her suggestion and from her stock that they used blank sheets of period paper upon which Hebborn could create original drawings, while Smith 'antiqued' them.

In 1963 they moved to Italy and opened a gallery, which attracted the attention of several of the art cognoscenti of the day. Notable amongst them was Sir Anthony Blunt, who often stayed with the couple when visiting Rome.

Smith and Hebborn grew apart and in 1969 Smith returned to London. He moved into fabric and wallpaper design, creating stylised designs of trees, flowers, birds and animals for Jean Muir and Osborne & Little, amongst others.

In the late 1970s Smith relocated with his lover John Elliker to California, and again changed artistic direction, now working in book illustration under the name Paul Cline.

After Elliker died in 1987, Smith began to create a series of erotic drawings influenced by the medieval Dance of Death, and the resurrection of the genre by the Mexican artist José Guadalupe Posada. These reflected his horror at the impact of AIDS on the homosexual community. Geraldine Norman, in her article in The Independent refers to them as 'terrifying' and states that they use 'a highly finished academic style, reminiscent of the fine drawing taught by 19th century French academies'. They were exhibited in the Rita Dean gallery in San Diego.

At this time Smith also lived a parallel life on the fringe of the hustler community in Los Angeles. He became friendly with Rick Castro and memorably appeared as Ambrose Sapperstein in his 1996 movie Hustler White.

Smith's autobiography was published in 1996, which, he said, he wrote partly to refute some of the claims of Hebborn's own autobiographical work.

In 1997 Smith returned to London. He continued to write, mainly poetry, and to create further tableaux drawings on death and homo-erotic themes, until his death in 2021.

== Works ==
- Fools, clowns and jesters by Paul Cline, Green Tiger Press, 1984 ISBN 0-914676-88-1
- Mama, were you ever young? by John Williams Hay, Paul Cline and Judythe Sieck, Little Simon Press, 1989 ISBN 0-88138-134-9
- Amy and Nathaniel by Welleran Poltarnees and Paul Cline, Simon & Schuster, 1989 ISBN 0-88138-118-7
- Booboo's dream by Paul Cline and Judythe Sieck, Simon & Schuster, 1990 ISBN 0-9625261-1-8
- My mothers' hands by Paul Cline and Sheila McGraw, Aladdin Paperbacks, 1991 ISBN 0-9625261-2-6
- Ginger's moon by Paul Cline and Judythe Sieck, Green Tiger Press, 1991 ISBN 0-9625261-0-X
- Grummit's day by Paul Cline and Patricia Graham Rogers, Simon & Schuster, 1991 ISBN 0-9625261-3-4
- My father's hands by Sheila McGraw and Paul Cline, Aladdin Paperbacks, 1992 ISBN 0-9625261-6-9
- The Angel who forgot by Elisa Bartone and Paul Cline, Simon & Schuster, 1992 ISBN 0-671-76037-8
- A Most memorable birthday by Welleran Poltarnees, Paul Cline and Judythe Sieck, Simon & Schuster, 1993 ISBN 0-671-77862-5
- Celebration: the autobiography of Graham David Smith by Graham David Smith, Mainstream, 1996 ISBN 1-85158-843-4
