= Tony Ward (model) =

American model and actor (born 1963)

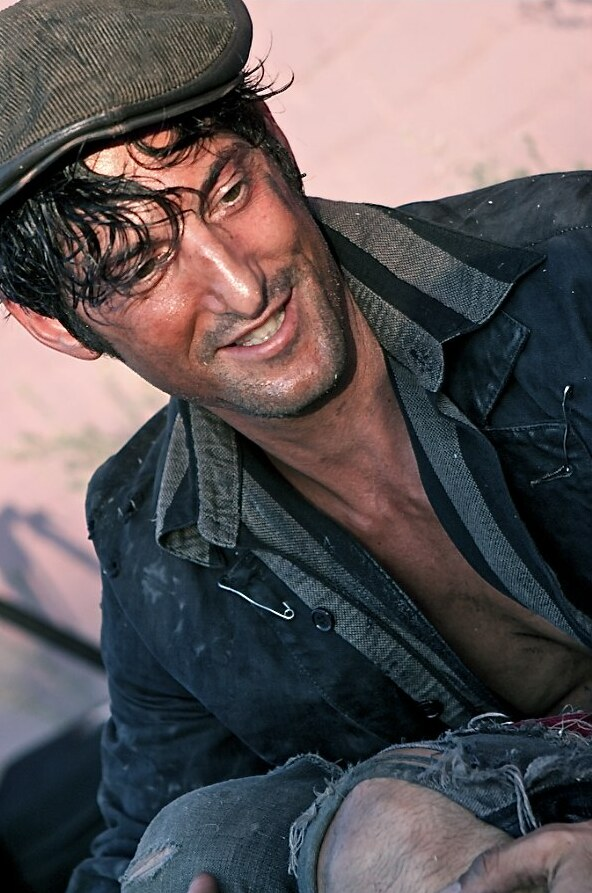
- Tony Ward, photo from a movie
- Born: Anthony Borden Ward; June 10, 1963 (age 63); Santa Cruz, California, U.S.
- Occupations: Model; actor
- Years active: 1981–present

Anthony Borden Ward (born June 10, 1963) is an American model and actor.

== Early life ==
Tony Ward was born in Santa Cruz, California, on June 10, 1963, to Robert Borden Ward, from Kansas, and Karen Elizabeth Castro. He is of English, Scottish, Irish, Swedish, and Portuguese descent. Ward is the second of three sons and spent his childhood mostly in San Jose before moving to Sonora where he graduated from high school. From there he moved to Los Angeles to pursue his dream of being an actor/model/dancer. Tony was discovered by a scout while attending West Valley College in Saratoga and started modeling at age 18.

== Modeling career ==
Ward began his modeling career in 1981, first for Calvin Klein underwear with images by Herb Ritts. Later he worked with photographers including Karl Lagerfeld, Steven Klein, Steven Meisel, and Terry Richardson; and for fashion designers such as Roberto Cavalli, Chanel, Dolce & Gabbana, Diesel, Fendi, H&M and Hugo Boss.

Ward is signed to DNA Model Management in New York City, Why Not Model Agency in Milan, Italy, Premier Model Management in London, Photogenics Model Management in Los Angeles, Unique Models in Copenhagen, and Bananas Models in Paris.

Ward has his own fashion brand SixInTheFace "Hand Ravaged Clothing by Mr. Ward".

Ward also shot for photographer Jim French of Colt Studio Group.

== Acting career ==
In 1996, Ward had his first starring role in the movie Hustler White, directed by Bruce LaBruce and Rick Castro. In 1998, he appeared in Sex/Life in L.A. Jochen Hick's adult documentary about the sex lives of the guys who make L.A. adult movies. Ward reunited with LaBruce playing a homeless junkie in the 2010 zombie thriller L.A. Zombie.

Ward appeared in then-girlfriend Madonna's music videos for "Cherish" (1989) "Justify My Love" (1990) and "Erotica" (1992), with the former casting him in a more prominent role as her lover. The latter shows Ward in quick snippets as the video is an amalgamation of footage shot during the making of the 1992 book Sex. In December 2022, he was reunited with Madonna at Art Basel in Miami Beach, for a beachfront exhibition celebrating the 30th-anniversary re-edition of Sex. In September 2026, he appeared on stage with Madonna at the 2026 MTV Video Music Awards in a live performance of her song "Danceteria".

== Personal life ==
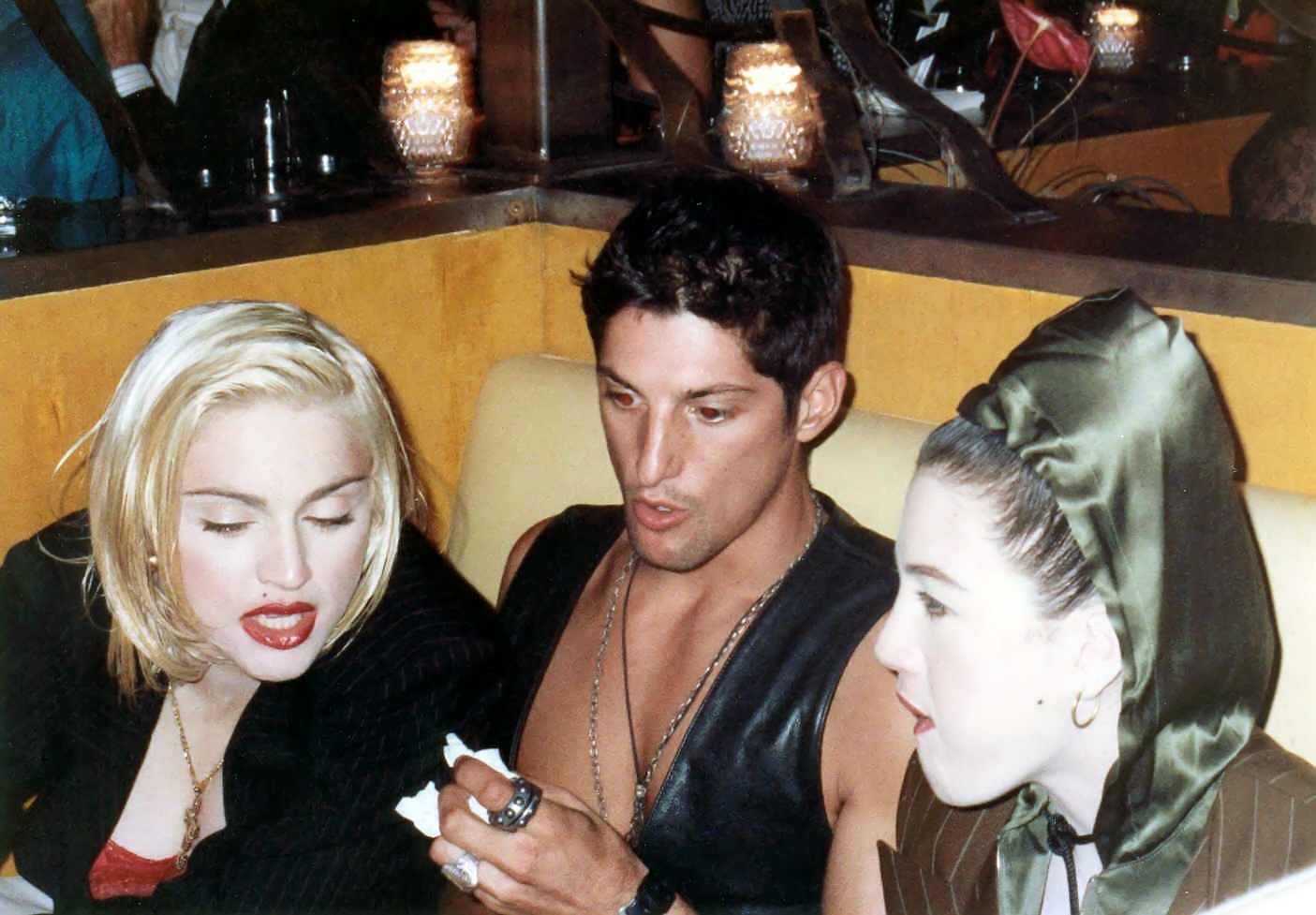
Ward (center) with Madonna (l.) and Madonna's back-up singer Donna De Lory at the AIDS Project Los Angeles benefit concert in 1990

Ward is also a painter and photographer.

Ward was Madonna's boyfriend in the beginning of the 1990s and he appeared in some of her music videos as well as the controversial Sex book in 1992. According to People on April 15, 1991:

"Madonna and male model Tony Ward, 27, her last boyfriend of record and one of the objects of her desire in the 'Justify' video, are no longer an item. It may be a coincidence, but he seems to have dropped from her arm at about the same time tabloids revealed that he had married an old flame, Greek-Australian photographer Amalia Papadimos, 23, in a quickie ceremony in Las Vegas on Aug. 21, 1990—after he had begun dating Madonna."

As of 2016, Ward lived in Palm Springs, California, and was the father of four children "spread across two continents". In a 2020 interview with MEL magazine, he said that he was in the process of divorcing an estranged wife, and was married and divorced several times prior.

== Filmography ==
=== Film ===
| Year | Title | Director | Role | Ref. |
|---|---|---|---|---|
| 1996 | Hustler White | Bruce LaBruce and Rick Castro | Lead role | |
| 1998 | Sex Life in L.A. | Jochen Hick | | |
| 1999 | Out in Fifty | Bojesse Christopher and Scott Leet | | |
| 2002 | All About the Benjamins | Kevin Bray | | |
| 2007 | Story of Jen | François Rotger | Lead role | |
| 2010 | L.A. Zombie | | | |
| 2010 | Out Getting Ribs | | | |
| 2022 | All Man: International Male | | | |

=== Music videos ===
| Year | Artist | Song | Director | Ref. |
|---|---|---|---|---|
| 1987 | ABC | "King Without a Crown" | Vaughan Arnell and Anthea Benton | |
| 1988 | Belinda Carlisle | "I Get Weak" | Diane Keaton | |
| 1989 | Madonna | "Cherish" | Herb Ritts | |
| 1989 | Taylor Dayne | "With Every Beat of My Heart" | David Kellogg | |
| 1990 | Madonna | "Justify My Love" | Jean Baptiste Mondino | |
| 1990 | Tommy Page | "I'll Be Your Everything" | Greg Masuak | |
| 1992 | Madonna | "Erotica" | Fabien Baron | |
| 1995 | Rusty | "Misogyny" | Bruce LaBruce | |
| 1996 | George Michael | "Fastlove" | Vaughan Arnell and Anthea Benton | |
| 1996 | Spice Girls | "Say You'll Be There" | Vaughan Arnell | |
| 1999 | Esthero | "That Girl" | Patrick Hoelck | |
| 2000 | Sinéad O'Connor | "Jealous" | Mike Lipscombe | |
| 2005 | Lisa Marie Presley | "Idiot" | Patrick Hoelck | |

== See also ==
- List of male underwear models
