= The Passenger (2005 François Rotger film) =

- Directed by: François Rotger
- Written by: François Rotger
- Produced by: Ian Boyd; Tom Dercourt; Mariko Hirakawa; David La Haye; Stéphane Raymond
- Starring: Yusuke Iseya; Gabrielle Lazure; François Trottier; Kumi Kaneko; Yosuke Natsuki; Ryō Kase; Veroushka Knoge
- Music by: Dan Levy; Olivia Merilahti
- Release dates: 6 August 2005 (Locarno Film Festival); 12 July 2006 (France)
- Running time: 88 minutes
- Countries: Canada, France, Japan
- Languages: French, Japanese, English

The Passenger is a film written and directed by François Rotger. It was produced in France, Canada, and Japan; and has dialogue in French, Japanese and English.

It was nominated in the 2005 edition of the Locarno International Film Festival, the Tokyo International Film Festival, and Angers's Premiers Plans European Film Festival.

From his early work, 74km avec elle (8 min, France, 35mm color) and Jan (21 min, France, HDcam color) author/director François Rotger explores the themes of deception and betrayal within the family circle, often leading to sudden and extreme violence.

== Synopsis ==
Yakuza Naoki Sando (Yosuke Natsuki) discovers his daughter Hiroko (Kumi Kaneko) in bed with his adopted son Kohji (Yusuke Iseya). Three years later, Kohji is working the streets as a hustler, still yearning for a way to earn his estranged father's approval to continue his borderline incestuous relationship. Hiroko sees a way back to her brother's arms when Sando's shady colleague Marc Tanner (François Trottier) absconds to Canada with gambling funds destined for the big boss. Presumably with her father's permission, she calls Kohji and tells him to hurry to Montréal, recover the money and kill Tanner.
