= Brian Balfour-Oatts =

British art dealer, collector and writer

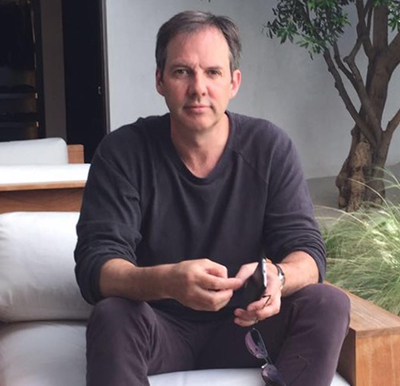

Brian Balfour-Oatts (born 1966) is a British art dealer, collector and writer. He published William Scott: A Survey of His Original Prints, a catalogue of William Scott's graphic work.

== Early life and 1990s ==
Balfour-Oatts grew up in Hawick and was a child carer for his mother, who had Huntington's disease. He attended Hawick High School and, at 18, joined Sotheby's in London.

At 22, Balfour-Oatts sold a portrait of Pablo Picasso’s muse Dora Maar to Heinz Berggruen, the work later entered the National Gallery on loan and is now held by the Berggruen Museum. He also handled a painting from Claude Monet’s Haystack series, acquired after negotiations with Daniel Wildenstein. In 1991, he founded Archeus Fine Art (later Archeus) in London, focusing on German Expressionism.

In 1994, Balfour-Oatts's Archeus Fine Art staged The Difficulties of Attribution, an exhibition of drawings by the art forger Eric Hebborn. Balfour-Oatts acted as Hebborn's agent during the final two years of Hebborn's life and acquired the rights to his 1991 autobiography, Drawn to Trouble. The book was republished in 1997 as Confessions of a Master Forger, with a new epilogue by Balfour-Oatts.

Hebborn's The Art Forger's Handbook was also published in 1997.

== 2000s ==
In 2005, Balfour-Oatts curated William Scott: A Survey of his Original Prints at Archeus Fine Art in London and wrote the accompanying catalogue of the same title. The catalogue has been cited as a reference for Scott's prints by auction houses including Christie's and Whyte's. Other exhibitions included a one-man show of Dan Flavin's work, Nothing As Full As The Air, and The Unseen Hand: Minimalism and Anonymity, featuring works by Donald Judd, Carl Andre, Robert Ryman and Agnes Martin in 2005 and 2006.

In 2004, Balfour-Oatts acquired 22 Brillo Box sculptures from the collection of Swedish curator Pontus Hultén, who had maintained that the works were connected with Andy Warhol's 1968 exhibition at the Moderna Museet in Stockholm. Balfour-Oatts obtained documentation from Hultén and the Andy Warhol Art Authentication Board before selling the works. Ten of the boxes were sold through Christie's for £475,650 to art dealer Anthony d'Offay.

Questions about the boxes' manufacture emerged after Hultén's death. Following an investigation, the Andy Warhol Art Authentication Board concluded that a small group had been produced in Sweden in 1968, while more than 100 others had been manufactured at Hultén's direction in 1990. The Board classified the groups as "exhibition-related copies" and "exhibition copies", respectively. The Board stated that it could neither verify nor invalidate Hultén's claim that Warhol had verbally authorized their production.

== Current Activity ==
In February 2023 Balfour-Oatts co-curated Pierre Soulages: Une Lumière Infinie, the first major posthumous exhibition of the work of the French painter and printmaker at Phillips (auctioneers) in London.

In 2023, Balfour-Oatts's gallery stated that he had been appointed an adviser to the estate of collector Emily Fisher Landau in connection with the sale of her art collection. In November 2023, works from the collection were sold at Sotheby's in New York. The evening auction on 8 November realized $406.4 million, while the evening and day sales together reached $424.7 million, making it the most valuable auction devoted to a woman collector at that time.

The evening sale was led by Pablo Picasso's Femme à la montre (1932), which sold for $139.4 million. Other major results included Jasper Johns's Flags, which sold for $41 million, and Ed Ruscha's Securing the Last Letter (Boss), which brought $39.4 million. The sale also established auction records at the time for Agnes Martin, whose Grey Stone II sold for $18.7 million, and Mark Tansey, whose Triumph Over Mastery II realized $11.8 million.

As of 2013, Brian Balfour-Oatts curates and deals for Archeus / Post-Modern.

== Publications ==
- Balfour-Oatts, Brian (2005). William Scott : a survey of his original prints. London: Archeus Editions. ISBN 0954941802.
