= Bornio da Sala =

Bornio da Sala (beginning of the 15th century, in Bologna – 13 August 1496, in Bologna) was an Italian lawyer, humanist, writer and professor of law at the Bologna University.

== Biography ==
Bornio da Sala was born in the beginning of the 15th century into a noble family in Bologna and would remain attached to his city of birth throughout his entire life. After completing his law studies in 1425, he began an academic career. Due to various talents and abilities, he held many offices and performed important university functions. A strong believer in Pope's rule in Bologna, he never concealed his convictions.

In 1459, Bornio was asked to deliver a welcome speech on the occasion of the Pope's Pius II arrival in Bologna. Instead of this, Bornio pronounced an invective against corruption and depravity addressed to his fellow city inhabitants. In consequence of his listeners' indignation, he had to seek exile from Bologna under the Pope's protection. The exact length of his life in exile is not known. In the 1460s, he finished his work at the university by handing over the law faculty to his sons. He died in Bologna on August 13, 1469 and was buried in St. Francis church.

Bornio da Sala exchanged letter correspondence with the most important humanists of his times, such as: Giacomo Ammanati Piccolomini, Francesco Barbaro, Andreas Pannonius, Giovanni Aurispa, Lodovico Casella, il Panormita, Poggio, Francesco Filelfo and Saint Ambrose Traversari.

Bornio da Sala is the author of numerous works, most of which were lost or have never been published. The most important among his treatises written in Latin include: De patientia or De civili bello, Contra impietatem Iudeorum, and De principe, which was dedicated to the duke Borso d'Este. He also composed poetry in Old Italian, which probably constitutes the most valuable part of his literary output.
