= Eric Hebborn =

English artist and art forger (1934–1996)

- Born: 20 March 1934; South Kensington, London, England
- Died: 11 January 1996 (aged 61); Rome, Italy
- Education: Royal Academy Schools
- Known for: Painting, Sculpture, Drawing, Art forgery
- Movement: Realism

Eric Hebborn (20 March 1934 – 11 January 1996) was an English painter, draughtsman, art forger, and later an author.

== Early life ==
Eric Hebborn was born in South Kensington, London, in 1934. His mother was born in Brighton and his father in Oxford. According to his autobiography, his mother beat him constantly as a child. He stated that at the age of eight, he set fire to his school, and was sent to Longmoor reformatory in Harold Wood; his sister Rosemary disputes this. Teachers encouraged his painting talent, and he became connected to the Maldon Art Club, where he first exhibited at the age of 15.

Hebborn attended Chelmsford Art School and Walthamstow Art School before attending the Royal Academy Schools. He flourished at the academy, winning the Hacker Portrait prize and the Silver Award, and the British Prix de Rome in Engraving, a two-year scholarship to the British School at Rome in 1959. There he became part of the international art scene, establishing acquaintances with many artists and art historians, including Soviet spy Sir Anthony Blunt in 1960, who told Hebborn that a couple of his drawings looked like Poussins. This sowed the seeds of his forgery career.

Hebborn returned to London, where he was hired by art restorer George Aczel. During his employ he was instructed not only to restore paintings, but to alter and improve them. Aczel graduated him from restoring existing paintings to "restoring" paintings on entirely blank canvases so that they could be sold for more money. A falling out over Hebborn's knowledge of painting and restoration destroyed the relationship between him and Aczel.

Hebborn and his lover Graham David Smith also frequented a junk and antique shop near Leicester Square, where Hebborn befriended one of the owners, Marie Gray. In organizing the prints catalogued in the shop, Hebborn began to learn more about paper, and its history and uses in art. It was on some of these blank old pieces of paper that Hebborn made his first forgeries.

His first true forgeries were pencil drawings after Augustus John, based on a drawing of a child by Andrea Schiavone. Smith states that several of these were sold to their landlord Mr. Davis, several to Bond Street galleries, and two or three through Christie's sale rooms.

Eventually Hebborn decided to settle in Italy with Smith. They founded a private gallery there.

== Life as a forger ==
When contemporary critics did not seem to appreciate his own paintings, Hebborn began to copy the style of old masters such as: Corot, Castiglione, Mantegna, Van Dyck, Poussin, Ghisi, Tiepolo, Rubens, Jan Breughel and Piranesi. Art historians such as Sir John Pope Hennessy declared his paintings to be both authentic and stylistically brilliant and his paintings were sold for tens of thousands of pounds through art auction houses, including Christie's and Sotheby's. According to Hebborn himself, he had sold thousands of fake paintings, drawings and sculptures. Most of the drawings Hebborn created were his own work, made to resemble the style of historical artists—and not slightly altered or combined copies of older work.

In 1978 a curator at the National Gallery of Art in Washington DC, Konrad Oberhuber, was examining a pair of drawings he had purchased for the museum from Colnaghi, an established and reputable old-master dealer in London: one by Savelli Sperandio and the other by Francesco del Cossa. Oberhuber noticed that two drawings had been executed on the same kind of paper.

Oberhuber was taken aback by the similarities of the paper used in the two pieces and decided to alert his colleagues in the art world. Upon finding another fake "Cossa" at the Morgan Library, this one having passed through the hands of at least three experts, Oberhuber contacted Colnaghi, the source of all three fakes. Colnaghi, in turn, informed the worried curators that all three had been acquired from Hebborn, although Hebborn was not publicly named.

Colnaghi waited a full eighteen months before revealing the deception to the media, and even then never mentioned Hebborn's name, for fear of a libel suit. Alice Beckett states that she was told '...no one talks about him...The trouble is he's too good'. Thus Hebborn continued to create his forgeries, changing his style slightly to avoid any further unmasking, and manufactured at least 500 more drawings between 1978 and 1988. The profit made from his forgeries is estimated to be more than 30 million dollars.

== Confession, criticism and death ==
In 1984 Hebborn admitted to a number of forgeries – and feeling as though he had done nothing wrong, he used the press generated by his confession to denigrate the art world.

In his autobiography Drawn to Trouble (1991), Hebborn continued his assault on the art world, critics and art dealers. He spoke openly about his ability to deceive supposed art experts who (for the most part) were all too eager to play along with the ruse for the sake of profit. Hebborn also claimed that some of the works that had been proven genuine were actually his fakes. During this period, Hebborn went on record to state that Sir Anthony Blunt and he had never been lovers.

On one page he offers a side-by-side comparison of his forgeries of Henri Leroy by Jean-Baptiste-Camille Corot, and the authentic drawing, challenging "art experts" to tell them apart.

On 8 January 1996, shortly after the publication of the Italian edition of his book The Art Forger's Handbook, Eric Hebborn was found lying in a street in Rome, having suffered massive head trauma possibly delivered by a blunt instrument. He died in hospital on 11 January 1996.

The provenance of many artworks attributed to Hebborn, including some which are alleged to hang in renowned collections, continues to be debated. Both the J. Paul Getty Museum in Los Angeles, California and the Metropolitan Museum of Art in New York City deny that they feature any Hebborn forgeries, although this was disputed by Hebborn himself.

== Legacy ==
A documentary film Eric Hebborn: Portrait of a Master Forger, featuring an extended interview with Hebborn at his home in Italy, was produced for the BBC's Omnibus strand and broadcast in 1991.

The 2014 novel In the Shadow of an Old Master is based on the mystery surrounding Eric Hebborn's death and its aftermath.

In October 2014 it was announced that 236 drawings were to be sold, in individual lots, ranging in price from £100 to £500 each, by auctioneers Webbs of Wilton in Wiltshire. On 23 October 2014 the drawings went on to sell for over £50,000, with one sanguine drawing, after a design by Michelangelo, selling for £2,200, more than 18 times its expected price; Hebborn's modern drawing manual, The Language of Line, complete with pencil corrections and edits, sold for more than £3,000. Although the identity of the successful purchaser of The Language of Line remains unknown, and no further copies are thought to have been in existence, Hebborn's former agent Brian Balfour-Oatts allowed The Guardian to have sight of the manuscript, which had been sent to him by a friend of the artist. Details of the previously unpublished text were published by the newspaper in August 2015.

On 21 June 2025, BBC Radio 4 broadcast a play by Mike Harris about Hebborn's career, under the title Secrets and Lies: Fraud vs Fraud Hunter.

== Hebborn's books ==
- Drawn to Trouble, Mainstream, 1991 ISBN 1-85158-369-6
- Master Faker: The Forging of an Artist, An Autobiography, Pan Books 1992 ISBN 0-330-32620-1
- The Art Forger's Handbook, Overlook, 1997 (posthumous) ISBN 1-58567-626-8
- Confessions of a Master Forger, Cassell, 1997 (posthumous reprint of Drawn to Trouble, with epilogue by Brian Balfour-Oatts) ISBN 0-304-35023-0

== See also ==
- Han van Meegeren
- Tom Keating
