= Hustler White =

- Theatrical release poster
- Directed by: Rick Castro; Bruce LaBruce
- Written by: Rick Castro; Bruce LaBruce
- Starring: Tony Ward; Bruce LaBruce
- Cinematography: James Carman
- Edited by: Rider Siphron
- Distributed by: Strand Releasing, ICA
- Release date: 1996
- Running time: 79 mins
- Country: United States
- Language: English
- Budget: $50,000

Hustler White is a 1996 satirical black comedy film written and directed by Rick Castro and Bruce LaBruce. Starring Tony Ward, Ron Athey, Glen Meadmore, Graham David Smith and LaBruce, the film follows a group of hustlers and their customers on Santa Monica Boulevard in West Hollywood, California.

== Synopsis ==
Montgomery "Monti" Ward, a male hustler in Los Angeles, lies dead in a hot tub. In a voiceover, he narrates the events that led to this fate.

Sometime earlier, Monti steals the wallet of one of his tricks, and in his haste fleeing the scene commits a hit and run that cripples a fellow hustler named Eigil. Monti's bloodied tank top is recovered by Jürgen Anger, a writer conducting research for a book on gay prostitution and pornography. Jürgen becomes infatuated with Monti, and pursues him across the city. His pursuit is interspersed with the stories of various other hustlers, johns, and pornographers in the city, including a coroner with a mummification fetish and a white hustler hired to participate in an all-black gang bang.

Monti ultimately agrees to act as Jürgen's guide, and takes him to various locations in Hollywood's gay cruising and hustling scenes. They end up at Jürgen's apartment, where Monti slips on a bar of soap and knocks his head against the side of his hot tub. Believing that Monti is dead, Jürgen brings him to the beach to dump his body in the ocean, but Monti wakes up. The two kiss and run hand-in-hand down the beach.

== Cast ==
- Tony Ward as Montgomery Ward
- Bruce LaBruce as Jürgen Anger
- Alex Austin as Alex
- Kevin Kramer as Kevin
- Ron Athey as Seymour Kasabian
- Glen Meadmore as Stew Blake
- Ivar Johnson as Piglet
- Kevin P. Scott as Eigil Vesti
- Graham David Smith as Ambrose Sapperstein
- Miles H. Wildecock II as Peter Festus
- Bud Cockerham as Bud Cockram
- Michael Glass as Mrs Glass
- Vaginal Davis as Buster Boote
- Joaquín Martínez as Ryan Block
- Darryl Carlton as Divinity Fudge
- Tony Powers as himself
- Paul 'Superhustler' Bateman as Billy Ray Jaded
- Barry Morse (credited as Dimitri Xolt) as Roger V. Deem
- Paul Bellini as Roger's Secretary
- Matt Johnstone as UCLA Student Driver
- Max Millan as Amerikka
- Sean McAndrew as Hustler Twin #1
- Ryan McAndrew as Hustler Twin #2
- Stephen Mounce as Daddy's Boy Hustler
- Brent Hoover as Hustler
- Merie Morris as Hustler
- Billy Mauro as JFK Jr. Lookalike Hustler
- Rocco Haze as Monti's Baby
- Antonio Lee Klatt as Slave Hanging from Ankles
- Chris Berry as Porno Mexican Wrestling Extra
- Rick Castro as Clumsy Porno Cameraman

== Background and production ==
Castro says he had been chronicling the lives of male street hustlers along Santa Monica Boulevard since the late 1980s, and he shared that footage with LaBruce, telling him of his plans for a documentary called Hustler White. The title came from the hustlers preference for white jeans, which Castro recalled was; "because white made their baskets look bigger when illuminated by car headlights." Castro said the script is derived from his experiences while filming the hustlers, and the majority of the sex in the movie is unsimulated.

The film contains multiple cinematic references, with some lines read verbatim, including quotes and scenes from: Sunset Boulevard, Easy Rider, Trash, 3 Women, Rosemary’s Baby, The Killing of Sister George, What Ever Happened to Baby Jane? and Death in Venice. Castro said despite the film receiving a negative reception from the traditional LGBTQ community like GLAAD, the movie turned out to be a queer cult classic; listed on the top 100 underground art films of all time by American film critic Manohla Dargis; former French Minister of Culture Jack Lang classified the film as a work of art, and it is a personal favorite of filmmaker John Waters.

Castro cast real male hustlers and models he had previously worked with, including Ward. They also used the hustlers' homes, and other cast members' including Ron Athey's house in Silver Lake Hills, as location spots for filming. Portions of the film appear in the music video for "Misogyny" a track by Canadian rock band Rusty which appeared on MuchMusic and Musique Plus in the 1990s.

== Reception ==
Time Out observed "there are no women, no drugs, and no AIDS-consciousness in this sideways spin on the rituals of meeting cute, and it's on the level of mid 1970s John Waters, delighting more in shock value than technical accomplishment." In her review for The Austin Chronicle, Marjorie Baumgarten wrote, "LaBruce seems to be trying for more of a streetwise, Andy Warhol type aesthetic, than any type of pornographic pay-off." She concludes the film "layers its seamy walk on the wild side with a vivid portrait of a day in the life."

Daniel Mangin wrote in The Advocate that the film consists of a "series of kinkily comic setups wrapped around a flimsy variation on the Sunset Boulevard theme; it has plenty of wacky moments and a hallucinogenic swirl of pop-culture references, but only in a few vignettes does the payoff truly match the buildup." José Arroyo of Sight and Sound says the film "has a very loose structure, somewhat similar to Slacker, which makes the story really a collection of episodes which happen in the same milieu but don't neccesarily connect." He also notes that the film "has scenes that some may find shocking, but as each episode has a different protagonist, these scenes are neither judgemental nor immoral."

In his review for the Boston Globe, Matthew Gilbert opined that it is a "humorous day-in-the-life movie about a community of male prostitutes and porn actors and this is a Bruce LaBruce spectacular: lots of camp film references, nonstop carefree (though sometimes painful) sexual encounters, profuse narrative looseness and plenty of underground, insider, outrageous, post-punk, post-queer attitude." Barry Walters wrote in the San Francisco Examiner, "LaBruce takes a giant step forward in terms of plot development and cinematography." He also singled out Tony Ward, saying; "he's perfect to play a hustler named Montgomery Ward, and his chiseled physique and blank expression suits Santa Monica Boulevard just fine."

Film critic Stephen Holden quipped that "there are those who will not want to miss Hustler White for its scene in which a male prostitute removes his prosthetic leg extension to service a client who has been shown devouring a publication called Amputee Times. There are many, many more who will want to make sure to miss it." Overall, he concludes that "it is not a pornographic film, strictly speaking, and any movie that conveys this much detailed information on the geography and social terrain of Santa Monica Boulevard must have some redeeming social value."

== See also ==
- List of LGBTQ-related films
- List of feature films with gay characters
- Homoeroticism
