= Gregorius Coelius Pannonius =

16th-century Hungarian Pauline monk and theological writer

- Died: 1552; Rome, Papal States
- Occupations: Theologian; friar
- Writing career
- Language: Latin; Hungarian
- Period: 1530s–1540s
- Notable work: Commentaria in Cantica Canticorum Salamonis

Gregorius Coelius Pannonius (Hungarian: Coelius Gergely; died 1552) was a 16th-century Hungarian Pauline monk and theological writer.

== Biography ==
Earlier historiography mistakenly identified him with Gergely Gyöngyösi and/or Gergely Bánffy. His Humanist surnames Coelius and Pannonius refer to the Caelian Hill (where he served as prior, see below) and the Kingdom of Hungary (country of origin), respectively.

Coelius took the monastic vows in the Monastery of St Lawrence at Buda, before its vicar Gáspár Pesti. By January 1534, Coelius functioned as secretary of Bálint Hadnagy, who was general prior of the Pauline Order from 1532 to 1536. He regularly corresponded on religious matters with Gergely Simontornyai, one of the earliest Protestant Reformers in Hungary. Their harsh correspondence survives from 1534, preserved by the Paulines' Formularium maius. Simontornyai recommended an undetermined postil of Martin Luther (possibly regarding the Bible translation of Martin Bucer) to Coelius to read. In response, Coelius – who stayed in the Pauline monastery of Gombaszög then – wrote that "I fear the Lord, who did not recommend to me the fugitive Luther, but rather the shepherd Peter, and said to him: Feed my sheep. I am one of these sheep, who feeds on the institutions of Christ and his shepherd." Despite all of Simontornyai's theological arguments, Coelius persisted in his Catholic faith throughout the correspondence, adding "may the earth swallow me up if I ever think of agreeing with Luther's schism".

Coelius served as prior of the Pauline monastery at Santo Stefano al Monte Celio (Santo Stefano Rotondo) in Rome from 1537 until his death in 1552. In the late 1530s, he had his monastery's various documents compiled into a collection and authenticated. The income from the monastery in Rome was used to cover the cost of the Pauline Breviary printed in Venice in 1540. Gregorius was also responsible for having four large psalm books prepared in 1546 for the completion of the choral prayer. Various printing orders are also related to his priory.

== Works ==
=== Annotationes in regulam divi Augustini episcopi (1537) ===
His commentary on the Rule of Saint Augustine together with its Hungarian translation was published by the print house of Ioannes Patavinus and Venturinus Roffinelli in Venice in 1537. The work was printed several times in the 17th and 18th centuries (for instance, in Kraków and Vienna in 1642 [without the Hungarian translation], Pressburg in 1742, Nagyvárad in 1743 and Częstochowa in 1756), which indicates its frequent use within the Pauline order. The only surviving copy was kept in Csíksomlyó (present-day Șumuleu Ciuc, Romania) since the mid-17th century. It was discovered by Lajos Dézsi in 1900 and re-discovered by Erzsébet Muckenhaupt in 1982. Its facsimile edition was published by Gábor Sarbak in 2001. Currently, the manuscript is located in the Muzeul Secuiesc al Ciucului in Miercurea Ciuc. It originally contained 104 folios, but three of them were lost.

Coelius dedicated his work to Gáspár Pesti, general prior of the order, with the date 12 March 1537 in Venice. The preface is almost verbatim identical to a treatise of Tamás Szombathelyi (Aliud thema regule), a fellow Pauline friar from the late 15th century, who himself utilized the works of Hugh of Saint Victor and Humbert of Romans. Coelius' work consists of two parts: firstly, the Rule of Saint Augustine with its translation to Hungarian and the author's commentary, secondly, the translation of the text of the monastic vows and reflection on its content. The first part contains about one and a half hundred quotes from the Bible, one third of which are from the Old Testament. There are also quotations from scholastic authors, including Bonaventure (1), Jerome (1), Bernard of Clairvaux (3), the Corpus Juris Canonici (1), Saint Gregory the Great (7), the Glossa ordinaria (1), Haimo of Auxerre (1), Basil of Caesarea (1), the Vitae Patrum (1) and the constitution of the Pauline Order (1). Coelius' intention was to compile a manual that was transparent and useful in content and scope for his fellow monks; each discussion concludes with a short summary of the main points.

The second part (with the title De recognitione professionis) analyzes the monastic vow by utilizing the texts of the Bible, Saint Gregory the Great, Jerome, Ambrose, Bernard of Clairvaux and Ovid. The part also contains the Latin and Hungarian versions of the Paulines' monastic vow.

=== Collectanea in sacram Apocalypsin d. Ioannis apostoli et evangelistae (1547) ===
Coelius wrote his Latin-language commentary on the Apocalypse of John for the Pauline monks with theological expertise. It was published in 1547 by the printing house of Petrus Liechtenstein in Venice. It was re-published several times in the 16th century (for instance, in Paris in 1571). The work was re-published in Nagyszombat (present-day Trnava, Slovakia) in 1682. Based on this variant, Coelius' commentary was translated into Hungarian by Pauline friar Mihály Török in the mid-18th century, which is a sign of connection between late medieval mysticism and the ecclesiastical national consciousness-bearing spirituality of the 18th century Hungarian Baroque.

In his work, Coelius applies the prophecies of the Book of Revelation to his own time and warns of the impending dangers. He especially fears the Turkish conquest of Europe: he describes Battle of Mohács, the fall of Buda, the Turks heading towards Vienna, and after that no one in Europe will stop them. Based on the researches of Sándor Ritz it is known that the rich symbolism and building structure of the Santo Stefano Rotondo follows the description of the heavenly Jerusalem in the Book of Revelation, which inspired Coelius' work.

=== Commentaria in Cantica Canticorum Salamonis (1548) ===
Gregorius Coelius wrote his commentary on the Song of Songs in 1548, during his stay in Rome. Its earliest known copy was printed in Vienna in 1681 by the printing house of Leopold Voigt, with the contribution of Pauline and Jesuit friars. According to the letter of recommendation to György Szelepcsényi, the Archbishop of Esztergom, the manuscript was known to the Pauline Order, but due to unfavorable circumstances – the Ottoman conquest and the Reformation in Hungary –, it took 133 years for it to be printed. No manuscript copies are known. According to Croatian Jesuit friar Laurentius Chrysogonus, who utilized its text, a copy was kept in the Pauline monastery in Lepoglava around 1646. After its print in 1681, copies were kept in the Pázmáneum, the episcopal libraries of Eger and Győr, in addition to the Jesuit college at Nagyszombat (present-day Trnava, Slovakia).

Coelius provides the ecclesiological interpretation of the Song of Songs, which is viewed it as an allegory of Christ and his bride, the Church, with the elements of Mariology. The structure of the prologue resembles with Origen's prologue, which served as a model for many other Song of Songs commentaries too. Coelius uses the method of typology analyzing the persons of Solomon and the bride (who is equivalent to either Mary or the Church). In the Song of Songs, Coelius sees it as an abbreviated version of the entire Gospels, a kind of allegorical extract. Coelius used a broad source base for his commentary, from classical antique authors (e.g. Virgil, Cicero, Tibullus) to contemporary poets (Jacopo Sannazaro's De partu Virginis), and illustrates several events in Roman history in his commentary, in addition to the in-depth knowledge of Roman banquet ceremonies. Regarding the latter, Coelius utilized Lectionum antiquarum libri compiled by Caelius Rhodiginus in Venice. By listing these, Coelius analyses 5:1 verse of the Song of Songs and illustrates the incomparable sublimity of the Last Supper, and, thus, Eucharist, which makes amends for original sin, and feeds the heart, soul and mind instead of the body, flesh and belly. Prior to that, only Paschasius Radbertus, Hildegard of Bingen and Andreas Pannonius used the 5:1 verse as an argument to interpret Eucharist.

The list of Coelius' sources does not only include established sources from the medieval Christian Song of Songs textual interpretation tradition (Augustine of Hippo, Bernard of Clairvaux or Rupert of Deutz), but also Ancient Greek and Roman authors, for instance, Apuleius, Cicero, Claudian, Columella, Ovid, Plutarch or Plautus, in addition to the contemporary Neoplatonist, Hebraist and Christian Kabbalist philosophers. Among them, Agazio Guidacerio and Francesco Giorgi influenced Coelius' theses on high impact. He used the triple translation of Guidacerio and his Hebrew sources (Abraham ibn Ezra). Coelius was acquainted with Zohar through Giorgi's In Scripturam Sacram Problemata.

== Sources ==
- Balázs Kovács, Sándor (2023). K. Németh, András (ed.). "Egy írásbeli hitvita a reformáció korai időszakából: Simontornyai Gergely és Gregorius Coelius Pannonius [A Religious Debate in Writing from the Period of the Early Protestant Reformation: Gergely Simontornyai and Gregorius Coelius Pannonius]". A Wosinszky Mór Múzeum Évkönyve (in Hungarian). 45: 195–218. doi:10.55022/WMME.2023.6. ISSN 0865-5464.
- Bíró, Csilla (2017). "Gregorius Coelius Pannonius Énekek éneke-kommentárja [Gregorius Coelius Pannonius' Commentary on the Song of Songs]". OSZK Tudományos Ülésszak, 2016. november 24–25 (in Hungarian). National Széchényi Library. pp. 123–131.
- Bíró, Csilla (2018). "Az Énekek éneke 5,1 verse mint az Eucharisztia előképe Andreas Pannonius és Gregorius Coelius Pannonius kommentárjában [Song of Songs 5.1 as a Type of the Eucharist in the Commentaries of Andreas Pannonius and Gregorius Coelius Pannonius]". In Szelestei N., László (ed.). Eucharisztia és Úrvacsora a 16–18. századi Magyarországon [Eucharist and Lord's Supper in 16th–18th-century Hungary] (in Hungarian). MTA–PPKE Barokk Irodalom és Lelkiség Kutatócsoport. pp. 33–43. ISBN 978-963-508-898-0.
- Bíró, Csilla (2025). "Gregorius Coelius Pannonius pálos szerzetes hebraista forrásairól [On the Hebraist Sources of Pauline Friar Gregorius Coelius Pannonius]". In Papp, Ingrid (ed.). A könyv a kora újkori Kárpát-medence művelődésében. Kiadás, befogadás, használat [The Book in the Culture of the Early Modern Carpathian Basin. Release, Reception, Usage] (in Hungarian). MTA Könyvtár és Információs központ & HUN-REN BTK Irodalomtudományi Intézet. pp. 181–188. ISBN 978-615-6792-08-2.
- Bojtos, Anita (2016). "Epizód a magyar vonatkozású bécsi könyvkiadás XVII. századi történetéből: Gregorius Coelius Pannonius Énekek éneke-kommentárja, 1681 [An Episode from the 17th-century History of Hungarian-related Viennese Book Publishing: Gregorius Coelius Pannonius' Song of Songs Commentary, 1681]". In Baráth, Dóra; Kiss, Alpár (eds.). Habitus: Tanulmányok a Colloquium Officiale II konferencia előadásaiból (in Hungarian). Mika Sándor Egyesület. pp. 111–142. ISBN 978-963-899-952-8.
- Sarbak, Gábor, ed. (2001). Gregorius Coelius Pannonius: Annotationes in regulam divi Augustini episcopi Hungarico sermone luculentissime donatam in gratiamfratrum eremitarum ordinis sancti Pauli primi eremite ... Venetiis 1537 (in Latin and Hungarian). Státus Könyvkiadó. ISBN 973-831-105-5.
- Sarbak, Gábor (2005). "Gregorius Coelius Pannonius". In Kőszeghy, Péter (ed.). Magyar Művelődéstörténeti Lexikon. Középkor és kora újkor III. falkonéta – halászat [Hungarian Cultural History Lexicon. Middle Ages and Early Modern Period III. falconet – fishing] (in Hungarian). Balassi Kiadó. p. 363. ISBN 963-506-605-8.
