= Raoul Manselli =

Italian historian

Raoul Manselli (1917–1984) was an Italian historian.
