= Rick Castro =

American photographer (born 1958)

- Born: July 20, 1958 (age 68); Los Angeles, California
- Known for: Photography

Rick Castro (July 20, 1958) is an American photographer, motion picture director, stylist, curator and writer whose work focuses on fetish and desire.

== Early life ==
Born and raised in the suburbs of Monterey Park, California, Rick Castro grew up inspired by pre-code and film noir productions such as Frankenstein (1931), Dracula (1931), and Mildred Pierce (1945). As a teenager fresh out of high school, Castro briefly attended Art Center and Los Angeles Trade Tech in classes related to fashion illustration, pattern making and later photography. Soon after, he began to work as a fashion stylist and clothing designer for his independent clothing and millinery brand I Love Ricky.Over the years, he worked for as a stylist and costume designer for Marlene Stewart, Toni Basil, Tina Turner, John Leguizamo, Bette Midler, David Bowie, Herb Ritts, George Hurrell, Interview, GQ, Vanity Fair, Rolling Stone, I-D, and the style agency Cloutier. Castro was the designer for Michèle Lamy's first menswear collection, Lamy Men from 1986–1989. During his time working for Lamy, Castro introduced Rick Owens into the brand as the pattern maker.

== Photographic career ==
In 1986, photographer Joel-Peter Witkin took him to purchase his first camera in Albuquerque. Working under Joel as the model scout, wardrobe stylist and photography assistant, Rick helped create a number of Joel's iconic photographs, such as Leda, Los Angeles (1986) featuring The Goddess Bunny. During that year, Rick took his first photograph of an unknown model, Anthony Borden Ward. In 1988, at the age of 30, Castro became a freelance photographer, and his work appeared in the Los Angeles gay news magazines Frontiers, Drummer and the national gay news magazine, The Advocate. His first photography exhibition "Mass Murder and a Cute Boy" was in 1989 at the historic A Different Light bookstore in Silverlake, Los Angeles.

His 1993 VHS footage inspired Bruce LaBruce to film Hustler White with Tony Ward. Castro collaborated on the film as writer and co-director with LaBruce. In 1998, he appeared in Jochen Hick's adult documentary Sex/Life in L.A. about the sex lives of the filmmakers in the Los Angeles adult film industry. Castro has directed a number of other short films and a documentary, Plushies & Furries, (2001) for MTV.

Castro's first gallery opened at Michèle Lamy's Les Deux Cafés in 2002, with the first furry themed art show. In 2005, Castro founded Antebellum Gallery, claimed as the only fetish gallery in the world, which he ran from 2005 to 2017.

Working primarily in black and white photography, Castro's lighting and posing style is influenced by his early career working with Greg Gorman, Joel-Peter Witkin, Herb Ritts and George Hurrell. In addition to his fetish photography, he has captured the portraits of figures such as Gore Vidal, Holly Woodlawn, Kenneth Anger, Alice Bag, Ron Athey, Tony Ward, Guillermo Diaz, Christeene and the 14th Dalai Lama. Castro has created editorial photos for Christian Dior Homme, Cartier, Bottega Venta, Versace, and numerous projects for Rick Owens. In 2014, Rick shot the F/W look book for his former boyfriend, designer Rick Owens using his 93-year-old father Al Castro as the featured model. In 2023, the anthology S/M Boulevard was published, featuring historical portraits of street hustlers on Santa Monica Boulevard from 1986 to 1999. These photographs show the end the era of male sex work prior to the internet boom and became the inspiration for the film Hustler White. In 2024, the presentation "The Photographer's Eye: Rick Castro S/M Boulevard" was presented at the Los Angeles Central Library. Castro was a contributing photographer and writer for AnOther and AnOther Man Magazines UK from 2019 to 2021.

In October 2023, the solo retrospective "Rick Castro Forever" opened at the Hollywood Forever Cemetery in its historic columbarium. Being the first art exhibition of its kind, Castro's photography brought queer sensibility to the famed cemetery. As of February 2024, "Columbarium Continuum: by Rick Castro", is an ongoing photography exhibition hosted in the Hollywood Forever Columbarium.

== Critical Assessment ==
Castro's photography also stands squarely in the quasi-religious tradition of most BDSM photography. The art historian and critic Edward Lucie-Smith has pointed out that Castro's work is deeply rooted in religious art, especially Catholic art of the Baroque period. The believer, suffering for his beliefs, is mimicked by the gay man, suffering for his homosexuality. The ecstasy of martyrdom is mimicked by the ecstasy of sex. These themes were explored by the great Christian Baroque painters, and Castro's bondage photography—like most bondage photography—draws heavily on these paintings for its poses. While religious imagery is not Castro's intention, he can see the relationship between fetish and religion due to the timeless quality of his photographs.

Writer Mark Christopher Harvey notes that Castro's photography 'can be viewed as a long form of meditation—not only on the aesthetic virtues of bondage but also on the psyche of sex itself...' Harvey points to the 'wry humor' that is often missing in more commercially-inspired or less artistic BDSM photographs.

== Awards and Collections ==
In October 2015, Rick Castro received an Artist Lifetime Achievement award from the Tom of Finland Foundation. Castro's work is collected by the Kinsey Institute for Research in Sex, Gender and Reproduction, ONE National Gay & Lesbian Archives at the USC Libraries, Leslie-Lohman Museum of Art, The Getty Institute and the Tom of Finland Foundation.

== Select Exhibitions ==
Group Exhibitions

- Verzabert: Proud to be Proud, Semjon Contemporary, Berlin, 2026.
- Vaginal Davis: Magnificent Product, MoMA PS1, New York, 2025.
- Phallus :: Fascinum :: Fascism, The Box, Los Angeles, 2025.
- Rick Owens: Temple of Love, Palais Galliéra, Paris, 2025.
- Queer Lens: A History of Photography, The Getty Center, Los Angeles, 2025.
- Copy Machine Manifestos: Artists Who Make Zines, Vancouver Artgallery, 2024.
- Copy Machine Manifestos: Artists Who Make Zines, The Brooklyn Museum, New York, 2024.
- Vitam Picturarum (A Life in Pictures), West Hollywood Art Fair, 2024.
- Rick Castro S/M BLVD, Tom of Finland Art & Culture Festival, Halle am Berghain, Berlin, 2024.
- Queer-ish: Photography and the LGTBQ+ Imaginary, Scripps College, Claremont, 2023.
- Rick Owens: Subhuman, Inhuman, Superhuman, La Triennale di Milano, 2017.
- Furotica: It Ain't Exactly Bambi, Track 16 Gallery, Los Angeles, 2003.

Solo Exhibitions

- Columbarium Continuum: by Rick Castro, Hollywood Forever Cemetery, 2024 - ongoing.
- Rick Castro: Would You Like Some Tea?, Galeria HGZ, Querétaro, Mexico, 2025.
- Rick Castro: Braver New World, Galeria HGZ, Mexico City, 2025.
- Rick Castro: BAAL. 1986-2025, Semjon Contemporary, Berlin, 2024.
- Las Trece Vidas de Rick Castro, Galeria HGZ, Querétaro, Mexico, 2024.
- Rick Castro: Fetish King, Tom of Finland Foundation, Echo Park, 2019.
- Rick Castro: Masterworks, Antebellum Gallery, Hollywood, 2014.

Installations

- Collective Memory Installation by Illuminate LA, Grand Park, Los Angeles, 2023.

== Published books ==
- Sweet, Sam (2024-06-24). Rick Castro S/M Blvd: Photographs of Hustlers & Remembrances 1986-1999. All Night Menu. ISBN 978-0-9992682-1-6.
- Castro, Rick (2004). 13 Years of Bondage: The Photography of Rick Castro. Bondage Series. Los Angeles: Fluxion Editions. ISBN 0-9672129-4-4.
- Castro, Rick; Olley, Michelle; Childers, Michael; Flynt, Robert (2000). Homme. Masterpieces of Erotic Photography (in German). Edition Olms. ISBN 3-283-00368-8.
- Castro, Rick (1991). Castro. Bondage Series. Los Angeles: Tom of Finland Foundation. ISBN 1-879055-27-9.

He has also self-published the following hand-made books:

- Zack 1991
- The Bondage Book #1. 1992.
- The Bondage Book #2. 1993
- The Bondage Book #3. 1994
- The Bondage Book #4. 1996

== Filmed works ==
- 1992: Automolove
- 1993: Fertile Latoyah Jackson Video Magazine #1
- 1994: 45 Minutes of Bondage
- 1994: Fertile Latoyah Jackson Video Magazine#2 The Kinky Issue
- 1994: Three Faces of Women
- 1996: Hustler White
- 1997: Another 45 Minutes of Bondage
- 2001: Plushies and Furries
- 2013 ANTEBELLUM2013
- 2014: ANTEBELLUM2014
- 2015: ANTEBELLUM2015
- 2016: ANTEBELLUM2016
- 2017: The Dark Waters of Hotel Cecil
