= Konrad Oberhuber =

Art curator

Konrad Johannes Oberhuber (March 31, 1935 – September 12, 2007) was a curator at the National Gallery of Art in Washington, D.C.

Oberhuber is known for being the individual who first raised suspicion about subsequently renowned art forger Eric Hebborn when he noticed distinct similarities in style and types of paper used for two works supposedly by two different artists. After alerting the Morgan Library & Museum, further issues were noted in other works they had purchased from Hebborn.

Oberhuber was Curator of Drawings at Fogg Art Museum and Professor of Fine Arts at Harvard University’s Department of History of Art and Architecture from 1975-1987.

== Biography ==
Oberhuber was born in Linz, Austria and graduated from the University of Vienna.

Originally a curator at the Albertina graphic arts museum in Vienna, he served as director from 1987 to 2000.

Oberhuber died of brain cancer September 12, 2007, in San Diego.
