= Death Scenes 2 =

1992 film by Nick Bougas

Death Scenes
- Cover of the VHS tape
- Directed by: Nick Bougas
- Written by: Nick Bougas
- Produced by: Nick Bougas
- Starring: Anton LaVey
- Narrated by: Harold Wells
- Music by: Peter H. Gilmore
- Production company: Wavelength Productions
- Release date: 1992
- Running time: 82 minutes
- Country: United States
- Language: English

Death Scenes 2: Manson (released on DVD as Death Scenes 1: Manson) is a 1992 American mondo film directed and produced by Nick Bougas. The film was released on VHS by Wavelength Productions in 1992. It is the sequel to Bougas's film Death Scenes (1989), and received a follow up the next year, Death Scenes 3 (1993). The film focuses on graphic depictions of death, including war footage, the Twilight Zone: The Movie accident, the Manson murders, and the suicide of American politician R. Budd Dwyer.

== Background ==
Death Scenes 2: Manson is the sequel to Death Scenes. The film received another sequel, Death Scenes 3, the next year. It and its predecessor were directed, written, and produced by Nick Bougas. Its soundtrack was done by Peter H. Gilmore. Its executive producer was Ray Atherton. The voiceover was done by Harold Wells.

The film was released on VHS by Wavelength Productions in 1992. It is 82 minutes in length. It took its depictions of the Manson murders from recently released Los Angeles Police Department material. Outside of the general focus on violence, it is different in tone from its predecessor, with a greater focus on video rather than still image.

With its predecessor and its sequel, Death Scenes 2 was released on DVD by Anthem Pictures. Anthem, however, took "considerable liberties" with the ordering, and the numbering scheme was flipped: Death Scenes became Death Scenes 3: Los Angeles, Death Scenes 2 became Death Scenes 1: Manson, and Death Scenes 3 became Death Scenes 2: Uncensored Scenes of Death.

== Synopsis ==
Death Scenes 2 provides an inside look at the history of death, particularly war between the United States and other foreign conflicts. A short introduction of the horrors of war begins with the ideological findings from Ernst Friedrich. Friedrich was a German pacifist who wrote and published a book called War Against War. To illustrate his point of view on war, Friedrich displayed hundreds of disturbing photographs which fully revealed the horrors of World War I.

Next the film settles in a more national concern dealing with death: the mafia and urban gang violence. Going back to the 1920s and into the present day, some notable mentions in this chapter include Murder, Inc. from the 1940s and 50s. Photos of the murders taken place at the gang-run barber shop is shown, including the body of Albert Anastasia. Another national historic event talked about in the film is acts of political violence, briefly mentioning the 1950 assassination attempt of President Harry S. Truman and the 1954 US Capitol shooting.

The film goes into the "restless sixties", showing the graphic assassination of John F. Kennedy and several other politicians, both in pictures and in the Zapruder film. It features the video footage from the Twilight Zone: The Movie accident in 1982, where three actors were killed during an accident on a film set, as well as car crash footage from Signal 30, mass murder footage, footage of the Holocaust, and the suicide of R. Budd Dwyer.

== Reception and analysis ==
Several sources noted its inclusion of footage of the Twilight Zone accident. Rovi reviewer Robert Firsching called it "nauseating", with "the same war-atrocity footage already overused in dozens of other mondo films". However, he said the last 20 minutes were interesting, especially in its footage of R. Budd Dwyer's suicide, Manson murders crime and autopsy footage, and the Twilight Zone: The Movie disaster. A 2014 scholarly analysis considered Death Scenes and Death Scenes 2 some of the notable American "death films" of that era, alongside the Faces of Death films. A review in The Psychotronic Video Guide to Film described it as "disgusting" and "unlike many Mondo movies [...] all too real".

David Kerekes and David Slater noted it as a more traditional approach to the mondo film genre than the first film, with its focus on video rather than images, describing its major selling point as the Manson footage. Mikita Brottman described it as "neo-mondo" and, in its emphasis on video rather than still images as in the first film, "rather more voyeuristic than its predecessor, more gratuitously violent and explicit, and less of a studied essay on the inevitability of death." However, she wrote that it continued to be a "fierce and powerful film". She wrote that the voiceover was far less effective in this film than in the first. Christopher Seelinger found the film to be, in some ways, counter to the basics of the Mondo genre in its "absolute arbitrariness"; in comparing it to the other two films, he wrote that it instead had a "diachronic trajectory that progresses through a thanatological media culture". He said that it, in a way, "illustrates Baudrillard's thesis of the collapse of the boundary between physical reality and simulation" with its "boundless stream of death and death images".
