= Ben Garrison =

American political cartoonist (born 1957)

- Garrison in 1978
- Born: February 26, 1957 (age 69)
- Education: Angelo State University (BA)
- Occupation: Political cartoonist
- Years active: 1978–present
- Spouse: Tina Norton
- Children: 1
- Website: GrrrGraphics.com

Benjamin R. Garrison (born February 26, 1957) is an American political cartoonist and artist often considered part of the alt-right. Several of Garrison's cartoons have been controversial; critics have called him sexist, racist, anti-feminist, xenophobic, anti-government, and conspiratorial. Garrison has also been accused of antisemitism by the Anti-Defamation League (ADL). His cartoons often lionize American conservative figures and politicians, such as President Donald Trump and Rand Paul and often express favorable views of Trumpism and its political positions, and demonize liberal, moderate, and Never Trump movement figures such as former President Joe Biden and Hillary Clinton. Some alt-right activists and Internet trolls have edited Garrison's comics to incorporate further offensive content, including the antisemitic "Happy Merchant" caricature (actually by Nick Bougas).

In a 2015 interview with Breitbart News, he said he did not support any presidential candidate in the 2016 United States presidential election, but said he admired Trump for "shaking up the neocon-controlled Republican Party." Garrison has described himself as a libertarian.

== Early life and education ==
Garrison is the son of U.S. Navy member Benjamin C. Garrison. As a boy, he lived in Bremerton, Washington, moving with his family to San Angelo, Texas, in 1972 when his father retired. Garrison first began drawing when he was a child. He graduated from Central High School, San Angelo, in 1975 and attended Angelo State University, completing a Bachelor of Arts degree, majoring in art, and graduated magna cum laude in 1979. During university, he worked in a bakery and made donuts.

== Career ==
Garrison originally wanted to pursue a career in the fine arts, but later began working as a graphic artist at the daily newspaper San Angelo Standard-Times instead from 1978 to 1983, where his first editorial cartoon was published in 1980. In 1984, Garrison began working as an artist for the Seattle Post-Intelligencer until that newspaper switched to an online-only format in 1997. He then worked as a freelance illustrator, graphic designer and photographer. Garrison and his wife moved to Montana in 2009, and shortly after that, inspired by the 2008 financial crisis and the subsequent bank bailouts by the Bush and Obama administrations, he began drawing political cartoons after a 20-year hiatus. At the time, Garrison considered himself a libertarian and supported presidential candidate Ron Paul. Beforehand, Garrison did not know where he stood politically. Garrison posted his cartoons on his website and on libertarian message boards.

In 2010, Garrison uploaded a cartoon to the Internet called "The March of Tyranny," depicting global elite bankers as the Eye of Providence kicking members of the public with its legs, corresponding to both the Democratic and Republican parties, while barking orders from the mainstream media. The cartoon was his first to go viral and has since been translated into multiple languages. Subsequently, an Internet troll on 4chan posted an edited version of the cartoon in which the Eye of Providence has been replaced by an antisemitic caricature of a Jewish man ("Happy Merchant" by A. Wyatt Mann). Internet trolls later edited some of Garrison's other cartoons in a similar fashion, and he has since been called "the most trolled man in internet history" by alt-right political commentator Milo Yiannopoulos and the "most trolled cartoonist in the world" by online comics publication The Nib. Garrison threatened legal action against the trolls and put a disclaimer on his website. The trolls also gave Garrison many nicknames, the most used being "Zyklon Ben", a reference to Zyklon B, the gas used in Nazi concentration camps. Garrison is often linked to white supremacy and antisemitism, resulting in him being falsely included on a list of Ku Klux Klan (KKK) members by Anonymous. In 2014, Garrison spent more than 100 hours trying to remove libel on the Internet, but said it was "like trying to sweep the tide out with a broom."

From the summer of 2015 to January 2016, Garrison relied solely on his Patreon supporters and his political cartoons for income. In November 2015, Garrison uploaded a cartoon called "Attack of the Cry Bullies", which depicts college students as giant babies, with one of them in a "safe space" playpen. Books on logic and reason are shown burning in a fire in the foreground. After an image of the cartoon posted on Facebook was mass reported, the image was removed and Garrison's Facebook account received a 24-hour ban.

In 2016, Garrison said "I do cartoons that are anti-political correctness, anti-social justice warrior, because really what political correctness is is fascism with manners". In May 2016, a cartoon of Garrison's comparing Michelle Obama and Melania Trump drew national attention. The cartoon showed a "scowling, masculine and dowdy" Obama contrasted against a smiling and feminine Trump, with the caption "Make the first lady great again!". Mic called the cartoon "Antifeminist". In June 2016, Garrison uploaded a cartoon about the Brexit referendum called "Abandon Ship", which drew criticism from The Guardian for its portrayal of Muslims and was retweeted by British-Belizean businessman Lord Michael Ashcroft.

As of 2017, Garrison's cartoons regularly appeared on InfoWars, a far-right conspiracy theory and fake news website. His online attacks on survivors of the 2018 Stoneman Douglas High School shooting have also drawn criticism. In January 2021, following his support for the storming of the United States Capitol, Garrison was banned from Twitter, and has been reinstated, and temporarily suspended from Facebook.

Garrison's cartoons have lampooned several figures for their positions on the COVID-19 vaccines. In December 2021, Garrison drew a cartoon of Trump on the "Big Pharma Vaccine Bandwagon" being booed by his supporters. In January 2023, cartoonist Scott Adams announced that he was considering taking legal action regarding a Garrison cartoon about his views on vaccines. As Garrison's cartoons became more widespread, they have been regularly edited online including by Advance New Zealand and critics of the Bharatiya Janata Party and Indian National Congress in India.

Aside from political cartoons, Garrison does Cubo-Futurist paintings. For several years, he was represented by Bigfork's ARTfusion gallery, until Internet trolls began harassing the owners of the gallery.

=== 2017 antisemitic cartoon controversy ===
The Anti-Defamation League found Garrison's 2017 cartoon which was commissioned by Mike Cernovich, that depicted a withered green hand, coming out of a coat sleeve labeled "Rothschilds" with a yellow-triangle cufflink, as puppet master to George Soros who in turn controls puppets H. R. McMaster and David Petraeus, to be antisemitic. Garrison replied "All of this is not conspiracy theory, it is historical fact. Yet nowadays anyone who even mentions the 'R' word is smeared as anti-Semitic. Now they want any criticism of George Soros to be silenced by the same means."

On July 7, 2019, Garrison was invited to the White House for a "Social Media Summit", but following complaints from the Anti-Defamation League and others over the 2017 comic, he was then subsequently uninvited four days later (July 11). In July 2020, Garrison sued the ADL for defamation claiming the situation over the 2017 comic cost him "embarrassment, humiliation, mental suffering, anguish, injury to his name and professional reputation." Garrison was seeking $10.35 million in damages from the ADL. One of ADL's defences was that a Virginia court had no jurisdiction, as it was domiciled in the District of Columbia. The suit was ordered dismissed on April 15, 2021, after the parties had stipulated and agreed to dismissal of the action with prejudice, with each party to bear its own costs.

== Personal life ==
Garrison married Christine (Tina) Norton, an artist and illustrator, in 1982. In 2009, Garrison and his wife moved to Lakeside, Montana from Seattle. As of 2016, Garrison resides in Lakeside. In late September 2021, Tina Garrison revealed that the couple had had COVID-19 for several weeks, characterizing it as a "rough time", but both refused to seek professional medical treatment or hospitalization, instead choosing to treat it with ivermectin and beetroot juice.

== See also ==
- List of editorial cartoonists
- David Dees
