= Secret government =

Secret government may refer to:

- Shadow government (conspiracy)
- State within a state
- Deep state in the United States, alleged system
- Éminence grise
- Power behind the throne
