= Glen Meadmore =

Canadian musician, actor

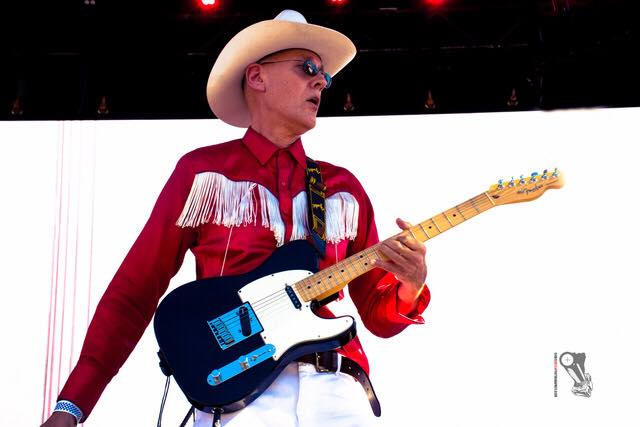
- Meadmore in 2016

Background information
- Also known as: Cowpunk
- Born: Winnipeg, Manitoba, Canada
- Genre: Cowpunk
- Occupations: Performance artist, musician, actor
- Years active: 1987–present
- Labels: Amoeba, Pervertidora

Glen Meadmore is a Canadian musician, actor, and performance artist currently residing in Los Angeles, United States. His music is often described as Cowpunk.

== Biography ==
Glen Meadmore was born in Winnipeg, Manitoba, Canada. As a teenager, Meadmore played bass and sang with Winnipeg punk band The Psychiatrists. He later became involved in performance art, and appeared on local community television on his own cable show. Meadmore is 6'8" tall.

Meadmore moved to Los Angeles in the early 1980s. He continued to work as a performance artist, appearing at the nightclub the Anti-Club where he became renowned for his outrageous performances. During this time, he met African American queer political performance artist Vaginal Davis and the two formed the band Pedro, Muriel and Esther, also known as PME, one of the earliest queer punk bands. Both Meadmore and "Vag" performed with the band in drag. Meadmore also used his drag persona for underground films he was making with director John Aes-Nihil, such as The Drift. He abandoned this persona in his later films, once again playing male roles.

Meadmore developed a "country punk" persona for solo albums he began recording in 1985. Glen's first two albums blended country stylings and country-style "yodeling" with new wave synthpop production popular at the time, which proved to be an odd and striking mélange. Drag superstar RuPaul performed as a backup singer to Meadmore, along with Vaginal Davis.

Meadmore's third release, the seminal country punk album Boned, dropped the synths and created the sound for which he is best known.

His fourth album, Hot, Horny and Born Again, was produced by Jack Curtis Dubowsky. Three of these songs were included in the Bruce LaBruce and Rick Castro film Hustler White, with Glen playing the role of Stew. During the 1980s, Meadmore corresponded with serial killer John Wayne Gacy who painted several portraits of Meadmore, one of which appears on the cover of Hot, Horny and Born Again.

Meadmore's most recent recording, Cowboy Songs For Lil Hustlers, produced by Steve Albini, continues in the vein set by Hot, Horny and Born Again.

Meadmore has performed and recorded with other artists and performers, including Helot Revolt. Meadmore's band includes Dave Kendrick a former drummer of Devo.

June 2007 saw the reissue of Meadmore's first two LPs on CD.

In February and March 2008 Meadmore toured Germany, Austria and Switzerland.

== Obscenity trial ==
Glen was arrested February 3, 1989 in Santa Barbara for obscenity related to a performance at UCSB's Pub as part of UCSB's Gay Awareness Week. He was initially charged with indecent exposure, but this was reduced to Disorderly Conduct pertaining to "Lewd and Dissolute Behavior," according to the newspaper The Independent. His attorney was Public Defender Rick Barron. The case was heard by Municipal Court Judge Frank Ochoa. Glen was found not guilty. This was during the 1980s when many queer performance artists were being tried for their work and having their grants taken away.

== Recordings ==
=== Albums ===
- Chicken & Biscuits, 1987, Amoeba Records; 2007 Pervertidora Records (reissue)
- Squaw Bread, 1988 Amoeba Records; 2007 Pervertidora Records (reissue)
- Boned, Amoeba Records
- Hot, Horny, and Born Again, 1993 Pervertidora Records
- Cowboy Songs for Lil Hustlers, 2002 Pervertidora Records

=== Singles ===
- "Just a Girl" / "Arco Plaza", 12" single, 1988, Overzealous Editions
- "Slurp Ramp" / "You're The One", Tape, 2015, Idiosyncratics

=== Compilations ===
- The Ma Barker Story Soundtrack & Compilation, 1990
- Keep on the Sunny Side: A Tribute to the Carter Family CD, Amoeba Records, 1993
- Prayer Is The Answer cassette, 777 was 666, 1998
- God Came Between Us limited edition CD, 777 was 666, 2005

=== As PME ===
- "PME", 7" vinyl EP, Amoeba Records, 1991
- The White To Be Angry CD, Spectra Sonic Records, 1998

=== Also appeared on ===
- Helot Revolt, In Your Face, Up Your Butt (guitar), De Stijl Records (1992)
- Songs from Hot, Horny and Born Again are used in the film Hustler White (soundtrack unreleased)

== Films ==
- Americans, by Chris Mullington, 1987
- The Drift, by John Aes-Nihil, 1989
- The Goddess Bunny Channels Shakespeare, by John Aes-Nihil, 1989
- Lovin In My Oven ( music video ) by Keith Holland and John O'Shea
- No Money, No Honey ( music video ) by Keith Holland and John O'Shea
- The Ma Barker Story, by John Aes-Nihil, 1990
- Hustler White by Bruce LaBruce and Rick Castro, 1996
- The Goddess Bunny, by Nick Bougas, 1998
- The White To be Angry by Vaginal Davis, 1999

== Sources ==
- Ciminelli, David; Knox, Ken (2005) HomoCore: The Loud and Raucous Rise of Queer Rock, Alyson Books, ISBN 1-55583-855-3, ISBN 978-1-55583-855-3
- Young, Paul (2002) L.A. Exposed: Strange Myths and Curious Legends in the City of Angels, p. 130, St. Martin's Griffin, ISBN 0-312-20646-1, ISBN 978-0-312-20646-8
- Mullen, Brendan (2006) Whores: An Oral Biography of Perry Farrell And Jane's Addiction, p. 186, (Glen as Performance artist.) Perseus Books Group, ISBN 0-306-81478-1, ISBN 978-0-306-81478-5
- The Independent May 18, 1989. Page 7. Article title: "Do the Funky Chicken." (On obscenity charge and trial.)
- Goldberg, Dan, "Performer Arrested in Pub for Overexposure" Daily Nexus February 6, 1989
