= Goddess Bunny =

American actress and drag queen (1960-2021)

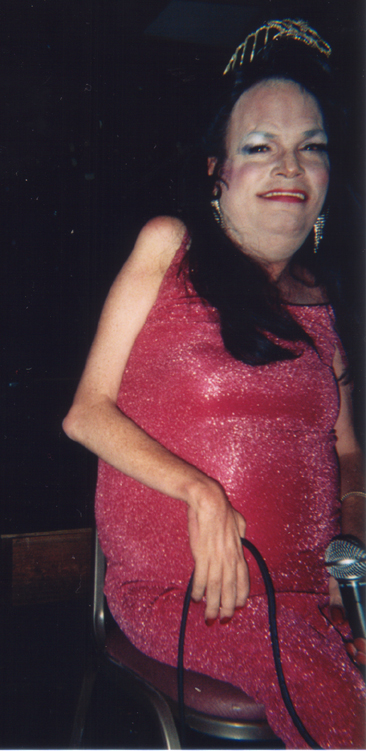
- Crisp in 2007
- Born: January 13, 1960; Santa Monica, California, U.S.
- Died: January 27, 2021 (aged 61); Los Angeles, California, U.S.
- Other names: Sandra Crisp; Sandy Crisp; Sandie Crisp
- Occupations: Drag queen; actress; model
- Years active: 1986-2021
- Known for: The Goddess Bunny

Sandie Crisp (January 13, 1960 – January 27, 2021), better known by her stage name The Goddess Bunny, was an American entertainer, drag queen, actress, and model. Footage of her tap dancing, originally recorded around 1987, was the subject of one of the first viral videos uploaded on YouTube mostly known as "Obey The Walrus". The original footage was posted on YouTube by user contron as part of his "mentally disturbing" series.

== Early life ==
Sandie Crisp was born on January 13, 1960, in Santa Monica, California, to John Wesley Baima, an Italian lawyer, and Betty Baima, a half-Cherokee secretary. Much of what is known of Crisp's life comes from her own retellings of events, some of which were fabricated. For instance, in 2018, Crisp claimed to have participated in the first Paralympic Games in 1974, but no such event took place that year in Los Angeles, where Crisp was based at the time.

Crisp contracted poliomyelitis soon after birth, resulting in lifelong disfigurement which necessitated Crisp using a wheelchair. Crisp was a transgender woman, transitioning in the late 1970s. After Crisp's parents divorced, Crisp lived in various foster homes for disabled children. These homes routinely subjected Crisp to physical and sexual abuse, largely due to Crisp's gender identity and disability. As a teenager Crisp went to live with her mother, coming out as a trans girl aged 14.

== Career ==
She performed as a drag queen during evenings. After meeting fellow drag queen Glen Meadmore on the set of Hollywood Vice Squad, Crisp would become his friend and collaborator.

Crisp began pursuing a career in the entertainment industry immediately after graduating from high school. She made her acting debut as Charlene in the 1986 film Hollywood Vice Squad. She later made an appearance in the music video for "The Dope Show" by Marilyn Manson. Crisp claims she was "paid nothing from the start" for her roles in music videos.

In 1994, she was the subject of a documentary titled The Goddess Bunny, directed by Nick Bougas; the film resulted in new popularity for Crisp. Biographers Harry James Hanson and Devin Antheus wrote that it "catapult[ed] her from underground it girl to underground star". Footage of her tap dancing, originally recorded around 1987, was the subject of one of the first viral videos uploaded on YouTube mostly known as "Obey The Walrus". Another documentary about Crisp, titled Bunny and made by Hunter Ray Barker, was released in 2019. The film is based in the assisted living facility Crisp resided in during her later years.

The Louvre has The Goddess Bunny as Leda (1986), a nude photo of Crisp taken by Joel-Peter Witkin, as part of its permanent collection.

== Personal life ==
Crisps's mother was deeply religious and rejected her gender identity, insisting on calling Crisp by her birth name, although Crisp would return to live with her mother at times during her adult life.

Although Bunny had no biological children of her own, she informally 'adopted' fans. She reportedly met one of her sons, film director Hunter Ray Barker, in a Mexican restaurant. Crisp acted as a muse for Barker, who made a short documentary film about her.

== Death ==
Crisp lived at an assisted living facility in Inglewood, California, towards the end of her life. She died of COVID-19 in Los Angeles, on January 27, 2021, 14 days after her 61st birthday.

Crisp's son, Hunter Ray Barker, created a GoFundMe appeal to raise money to cover Crisp's funeral expenses, seeking to honor her wish to be buried at the Hollywood Forever Cemetery.

== Filmography ==
=== Films ===
Title	Year	Role(s)	Director(s)	Notes	Ref.
Hollywood Vice Squad	1986	Charlene	Penelope Spheeris	Credited as Sandy Crisp	
The Drifter	1989	The Countessa	John Aes-Nihil		
The Goddess Bunny Channels Shakespeare	1989	Herself	John Aes-Nihil		
The Goddess Bunny	1994	Herself	Nick Bougas		
Sugar & Spice	1995	Herself	Larry Wessel		
God Is in the T.V.	1999	Herself	Various Samuel Bayer; Rod Chong; Paul Hunter; Dean Karr; Richard Kern; Marilyn Manson; E. Elias Merhige; Matthew Rolston; Floria Sigismondi; Tom Stern; Wiz		
S	2002	Herself	Athanasios Karanikolas	Short film	
The Three Trials	2006	Diner	Randy Greif		
Scumbag	2017	Gina	Mars Roberge		

=== Television credits ===
Title	Year	Role(s)	Notes	Ref.
Lou Grant	19??	Copy Boy	Unknown episode	
Americans (Mer-Kins)	1988	Unknown	1 episode	
Rage	2008	"Rage 'Ready for My Close Up' Special".	1 episode	

=== Music video credits ===
Title	Year	Notes
"Puppet Master"	1997	Soul Assassins (featuring Dr. Dre) music video
"The Dope Show"	1998	Marilyn Manson music video
"Fallen Leaves"	2006	Billy Talent music video
