= The Redneck Manifesto =

The Redneck Manifesto may refer to:

- The Redneck Manifesto (band), instrumental rock band based in Dublin, Ireland, formed in 1998
- The Redneck Manifesto (book), a 1997 book by American author Jim Goad
