= Death Scenes =

1989 film by Nick Bougas

- Cover of the VHS tape
- Directed by: Nick Bougas
- Written by: Nick Bougas; F.B. Vincenzo
- Produced by: Nick Bougas
- Starring: Anton LaVey
- Edited by: Sandy Weinberg
- Production company: Wavelength Productions
- Release date: 1989
- Running time: 82 minutes
- Country: United States
- Language: English language

Death Scenes (released on DVD as Death Scenes 3: Los Angeles) is a 1989 American mondo film starring Church of Satan founder Anton LaVey and directed and produced by Nick Bougas. The film was released on VHS by Wavelength Productions in 1989. It focuses on graphic photographs of death, taken from the notebooks of Jack Huddleston, an early 20th-century crime photographer. It received two sequels, both also directed by Bougas, Death Scenes 2 (1992) and Death Scenes 3 (1993).

== Background and production ==
The images in the film are taken from the scrapbook of Jack Huddleston, an early 20th-century Los Angeles crime photographer; he collected his crime photographs, taken in the 1930s and 1940s, into a large scrapbook. The scrapbook was sold to a bookstore that Nick Bougas worked at; Bougas, self-described as a "gore hound", was given the book. Fascinated, he kept it as a coffee table book; when the scrapbook started to deteriorate, he decided to develop it into a film in order to preserve it.

It was directed, written, and produced by Nick Bougas, also written by F.B. Vincenzo. It was produced by Bougas. Its executive producer was Ray Atherton and it was edited by Sandy Weinberg, with special photography by Tim Armstrong and music by Richard Gibson. The film was released on VHS by Wavelength Productions in 1989. It has an 82 minute run time.

It was influenced by another mondo film, Faces of Death. With its two sequels, it was released on DVD by Anthem Pictures. Anthem, however, took "considerable liberties" with the ordering, and the numbering scheme was flipped: Death Scenes became Death Scenes 3: Los Angeles, Death Scenes 2 became Death Scenes 1: Manson, and Death Scenes 3 became Death Scenes 2: Uncensored Scenes of Death. The film was later released as Faces of Death VII.

== Synopsis ==
Anton LaVey, founder of the Church of Satan, hosts the film, and narrates over a succession of Huddleston's crime photographs taken from the scrapbook. In an introduction, Lavey discusses the police scrapbook where the photos featured in the film originate, and the nature of death itself. In the introduction, he describes the film as:

a road map featuring the many avenues by which we encounter death [...] a brutally graphic collection of crime scene photographs [...] a tattered collection of horrid indiscretions, a true necronomicon.

LaVey's narration gives context on the events and circumstances leading up to the photos. In addition to the still death photos, the film is frequently intercut with footage from old Hollywood films. The first section of the film focuses on suicides and murder-suicides, then murders, with sections on lovers' quarrels and gang murders. It then considers deaths among Hollywood stars, including the deaths of, among others, Thelma Todd, Paul Bern, William Desmond Taylor, the Black Dahlia, David Bacon, Marie Prevost, Ross Alexander, Carole Landis, Lupe Vélez, Lou Tellegen, and Alma Rubens.

The murders of officers and criminals, like gangsters, are covered. LaVey discusses the specific cases and the broader societal circumstances, as well as the depiction of violence in film, the romanticization of criminals by the public, and the display of gangsters' corpses in contemporary newsreel footage, including John Dillinger, Bonnie and Clyde, Pretty Boy Floyd, and Baby Face Nelson. The next section focuses on pictures from fatal accidents, including fires and car crashes. Following that, the film devotes attention to child murders and sexual killings, including killings of prostitutes, rape-turned-murders, consensual sex gone wrong, and sexually motivated serial killers. Concluding with a series of graphic war footage, the film ends with LaVey's reflection on the meaning of death.

== Reception and analysis ==
Rovi reviewer Robert Firsching called the film "morbidly fascinating", and compared the film positively against its two sequels. He described Death Scenes as unusual among mondo films, with its focus on still images, with informative and "dry, witty narration" that was less vulgar than films like Faces of Death or Traces of Death, and which helped to balance the violence. He said the sequels lacked this and were more traditional mondo films. It was frequently compared to Faces of Death by reviewers and analysts.

A 2014 scholarly analysis considered Death Scenes and Death Scenes 2 some of the notable American "death films" of that era, alongside the Faces of Death films. James Aston considered it "more depraved and callous" than those films. A 2013 analysis characterized it (alongside Faces of Death) as a "shockumentary", showing "sequences of executions and accidental news footage", in contrast to a film like Cannibal Holocaust that has a narrative. Mikita Brottman classified it as "neo-mondo"; she considered it to be superior to the similar film The Killing of America in its "unflinching attitude" towards the subject matter, without even bothering to condemn the subject. She noted it as having "a deliberate and parodic kind of bad taste". Christoph Seelinger noted its approach to the material as at times humorous, finding it to lack the kind of narrative arc found in many mondo films; he found the film to become increasingly graphic as it progressed. He compared it to the film Inhumanities. David Kerekes and David Slater considered it one of only a few later mondo films that "have even attempted to be anything other than assimilation of real gore and despair". They considered its value to be in the snapshot quality, rather than the videos.

== Sequels and adaptions ==
The film was followed by two sequels also directed by Bougas, Death Scenes 2 in 1992 and Death Scenes 3 from 1993. The third volume was less popular than the first two. The sequels contained actual footage of death, and other than the focus on gore are largely dissimilar in tone. Bougas later directed other films on similar topics, including Death in Hollywood (1990). The film Faces of Death 5 takes a substantial portion of its footage from this film, as did the 1992 mondo film Mondo Cane IV. Later films of Bougas's also utilized clips from Death Scenes.

Bougas said at the time of the film's release that he intended to make a proper coffee table book out of the original scrapbook. The scrapbook was published as its own book, edited by Sean Tejaratchi and with an introduction by Katherine Dunn, published by Feral House in 1996: Death Scenes: A Homicide Detective's Scrapbook.
