= Mansfield Merriman =

American civil engineer (1848–1925)

Mansfield Merriman (March 27, 1848 – June 7, 1925) was an American civil engineer, born in Southington, Connecticut.

He graduated from Yale's Sheffield Scientific School in 1871, was an assistant in the United States Corps of Engineers in 1872–73, and was an instructor in civil engineering at Sheffield from 1875 to 1878. He was professor of civil engineering at Lehigh University from 1878 to 1907 and, thereafter, a consulting civil and hydraulic engineer.

From 1880 to 1885, Merriman was also an assistant at the United States Coast and Geodetic Survey. His research in hydraulics, bridges, strength of materials, and pure mathematics are important. He was elected as a member to the American Philosophical Society in 1881.

Merriman's chief publications, many of them widely used as textbooks, are:

- Method of Least Squares (1884; eighth edition, 1901)
- Mechanics of Materials (1885; tenth edition, 1912)
- with Jacoby, A Text-Book on Roofs and Bridges (four volumes, 1888–98; fifth edition, 1912)
- Treatise on Hydraulics (1889; ninth edition, 1914)
- Handbook for Surveyors (1895; third edition, 1903)
- Strength of Materials (1897; sixth edition, 1913)
- Precise Sanitary Engineering (1898; third edition, 1906)
- The solution of equations (1906)
- Elements of Hydraulics (1912)
- "American Civil Engineers' Handbook", Mansfield Merriman, editor-in-chief (fourth edition, 1920)
- Recreations in Mathematics (1917), under the pseudonym of H. E. Licks

In addition, he was editor-in-chief of the American Civil Engineers' Pocket Book (1911).

He published Recreations in Mathematics in 1917 under the pseudonym H. E. Licks, which included a story, "The Diaphote Hoax", a republication of a detailed newspaper report from February 10, 1880, which purported to describe the scientific demonstration of a device that transmitted images by electricity. The report is peppered throughout with scientific jokes including mentions of "Dr. H. E. Licks" ('helix'), "Prof. M. E. Kannick" ('mechanic'), "Col. A. D. A. Biatic" ('adiabatic'), and "Prof. L. M. Niscate" ('lemniscate').
