= Hollywood Vice Squad =

- Directed by: Penelope Spheeris
- Written by: Kenneth Peters (as James J. Docherty)
- Produced by: Sandy Howard; Arnold H. Orgolini
- Starring: Ronny Cox; Carrie Fisher
- Cinematography: João Fernandes
- Edited by: John R. Bowey
- Music by: Michael Convertino; Keith Levene
- Distributed by: Concorde Cinema Group
- Release dates: February 28, 1986 (U.S.); October 2, 1986 (Australia)
- Running time: 101 minutes
- Country: United States
- Language: English

Hollywood Vice Squad is a 1986 American sex comedy film directed by Penelope Spheeris with music by Keith Levene of Public Image Ltd. It marked Robin Wright's film debut.

== Plot ==
Pauline Stanton, a mother, travels to Hollywood to find her daughter, Lori, working in the porn industry.

== Cast ==
- Ronny Cox as Captain Jensen
- Frank Gorshin as Walsh
- Trish Van Devere as Pauline Stanton
- Carrie Fisher as Betty Melton
- Evan C. Kim as Chang
- Joey Travolta as Stevens
- Cec Verrell as Judy
- Leon Isaac Kennedy as Hawkins
- Julius Harris as Jesse
- Marvin Kaplan as Man With Doll
- Beau Starr as Farber
- Tom Everett as Miller
- Robert Miano as Luchessi
- Robin Wright as Lori Stanton
- Sandie Elizabeth Crisp as Charlean
- H.B. Haggerty as Tank
- Richard L. Duran as Nasty Man

== Reception ==
The film received mixed reviews. Janet Maslin of The New York Times described it as "decent, but dull."
