= Answer Me! =

American magazine

- Cover of issue 2, drawn by Nick Bougas
- Editor: Jim Goad; Debbie Goad
- Categories: Social pathology
- Frequency: Annual
- Circulation: 13,000
- Publisher: Jim Goad; Debbie Goad
- First issue: 1991
- Final issue: 1994
- Country: United States
- Based in: Los Angeles, Portland
- Language: English
- OCLC: 32916986

Answer Me! (typically rendered ANSWER Me!) was an American magazine edited by Jim Goad and Debbie Goad and published between 1991 and 1994. It focused on the social pathologies of interest to the couple. It printed only 4 issues, the first three being collected into a book, Answer Me! The First Three, published in 1994 by AK Press. Issue 4 of Answer Me! was the subject of a high-profile obscenity trial against two booksellers whose magazine store carried the issue.

== Background ==
The magazine was created, published, and edited by Jim Goad and Debbie Goad, then a couple, originally based in Los Angeles, later moving to Portland, Oregon. The couple later divorced.

Jim Goad had previously written for Los Angeles music magazines, as well as Playboy and Details; he was criticized for being insufficiently objective in his journalism, leading to the creation of Answer Me!, a publication aiming to lack any objectivity.

== Contents ==
The magazine was anti-"political correctness", and had a misanthropic ideology. It focused on morbid and strange topics, including serial killers, mass murderers, sexual perversion, and general bizarre behavior. It described its goal as to "inspire hatred both in those who love it and those who hate it".

The magazine featured artistic contributions from a variety of artists, including cartoonist Nick Bougas, Coop, Frank Kozik, and Jim Blanchard. It was originally published in Los Angeles, later in Portland. There were no advertisements included in Answer Me! It was one of several "hate literature zines" of the time.

The title of the magazine, Answer Me!, relates to a question asked by Jim Goad in the first issue: "why are you so fucking stupid?"

== Issues ==
=== No. 1 ===
Released 31 October 1991.

Several articles in the first issue were re-edited versions of pieces Jim Goad had written for other publications, only to have them rejected.

Featured interviews with Russ Meyer, Timothy Leary, Holly Woodlawn, Kid Frost, Public Enemy, Iceberg Slim, and pieces on Bakersfield, California, Sunset Boulevard, masturbation in literature, and Twelve-Step programs.

=== No. 2 ===
Released 17 July 1992.

Featured Anton LaVey, David Duke, Al Goldstein, El Duce of The Mentors, the Geto Boys, Ray Dennis Steckler, 100 serial killers and mass murderers, Vietnamese gangs, and Mexican murder magazines.

=== No. 3 ===
Released 19 July 1993.

Featured Jack Kevorkian, Al Sharpton, NAMBLA, the Kids of Widney High, Boyd Rice, Suzanne Muldowney, 100 suicides, guns, Andrei Chikatilo, pedophilia in Steven Spielberg's work, "Mexican deformity comics" (the series Casos de Insolito), paintings and drawings by murderers collected by Nick Bougas, and a prank call to a suicide hotline.

The editorial is signed in Jim Goad's blood.

=== No. 4 ===
Released 1994.

Known as "The Rape Issue", features a teen-mag-style interview with Richard Ramirez, Donny the Punk, work by Molly Kiely, Boyd Rice, Randall Phillip, Shaun Partridge, Adam Parfrey (on Andrea Dworkin), Peter Sotos (with illustrations by Trevor Brown), pieces on amputation, the police, racist country & western music, and Chocolate Impulse.

The magazine ceased after this issue.

=== Chocolate Impulse ===
Chocolate Impulse was a "hoax zine" created by Jim and Debbie Goad during their operation of Answer Me! Wanting to address the negative feedback they'd received from the zine community, the Goads wrote and distributed a zine, including a series of pseudonymous screed against themselves (in which they claimed to be the lesbian couple "Valerie Chocolate" and "Faith Impulse"), going so far as to set up a fake address for it in Kentucky. The zine received some positive response from the publishers of Feminist Baseball and other zines that had negatively reviewed the Goads. Factsheet Five described it as "strange" and "definitely not for the squeamish". In issue #4 of Answer Me!, Jim Goad revealed the prank and insulted those who had taken the bait.

=== Collections ===
The first three issues (which had gone almost immediately out of print) were collected as Answer Me! The First Three, published in 1994 by AK Press. They contain autobiographical introductory pieces by Debbie and Jim. AK Press refused to distribute the fourth issue. It was reissued, along with 60 pages of new material, by Scapegoat Publishing (ISBN 0-9764035-3-6) in 2006. He later released a new collection, ANSWER Me!: All Four Issues.

== Obscenity trial ==
In 1995, a complaint about issue no. 4 being sold at a Bellingham, Washington magazine store known as The Newsstand resulted in owners Ira Stohl and Kristina Hjelsand being tried on charges of distribution of obscenity. Charged with one felony count of promoting pornography, they faced a maximum sentence of five years in jail and a $10,000 fine. The defendants were found not guilty. A later lawsuit against the City of Bellingham by Stohl and Hjelsand resulted in the City paying $1.3 million to the plaintiffs on the grounds of violation of First Amendment rights and infliction of emotional distress. Goad expressed pleasure at the suit, saying it would only make him more famous.

== Reception ==
Factsheet Five described it as "the greatest zine on the planet". Suroosh Alvi described it as "intelligently written and sinfully alluring", considering it to be exceptional among magazines focusing on the subject matter for the high quality of its writing and production, writing that it could "easily take on the best of the mainstream press". The Guardian said of Answer Me! that "somewhere amidst this often brutal theatre of hate there is, bizarrely, romance. In their played-up whitetrash domesticity the Goads are the Richard and Judy of psychotics and sociopaths". A 1993 review in Maximum Rocknroll praised the magazine and Goad's writing for it.

Writing in 2015, BuzzFeed News described it as a "proto-Vice" magazine. Spin magazine retrospectively considered it one of the 50 worst moments of the 1990s, calling it a "fuck-your-feelings, catch-all zine" with an "undeniably ferocious vigor"; they wrote that it "seemed more like a proto-Tea Party circle jerk than some noble attack on 'good taste.'"

The magazine was found in the possession of a man who attempted to kill Bill Clinton.
