= Debbie Goad =

American journalist (1954–2000)

- Goad's senior yearbook photo, 1971
- Born: Debra Susan Rosalie; February 13, 1954; Coney Island, Brooklyn, New York, United States
- Died: July 20, 2000 (aged 46); Multnomah County, Oregon, United States
- Occupations: Journalist, editor
- Spouse: Jim Goad (m. 1987–1997)

Debra Susan Goad (née Rosalie; February 13, 1954 – July 20, 2000) was an American journalist and assistant editor of the magazine Answer Me! Her husband, Jim Goad, was the magazine's primary writer and editor. She also contributed to the zine Temp Slave!

Born Debra Susan Rosalie, she grew up in a Jewish family in the Sea Gate neighborhood of Coney Island in Brooklyn. She graduated from the State University of New York, meeting Jim Goad in 1986 while he was living in New Jersey. They married in 1987.

Jim and Debbie Goad divorced in December 1997, around the same time she was diagnosed with ovarian cancer. Her mother had died of the same cancer. Debbie Goad created a tract called Cancer Me! in response. She went into remission, but the cancer came back. She died July 2000, aged 46, from ovarian cancer in Multnomah County, Oregon.

== Works ==
- Best of Temp Slave!, edited by Jeff Kelly (1997), ISBN 1-891053-42-6.
