= Nick Bougas =

American filmmaker (born 1955)

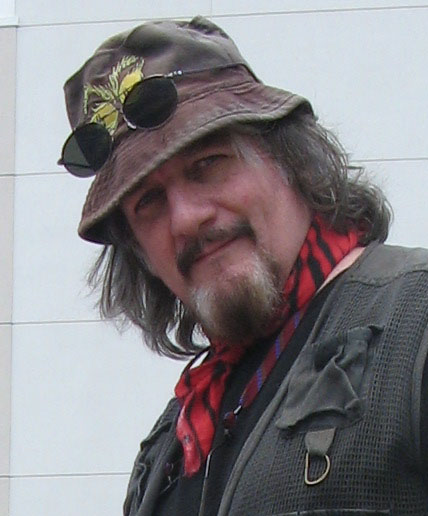
- Bougas in 2008
- Born: Nicholas Arthur Bougas; March 16, 1955 (age 71); Savannah, Georgia, U.S.
- Other name: A. Wyatt Mann
- Occupations: Film director; illustrator; record producer; cartoonist
- Employer: Wavelength Productions
- Notable work: Death Scenes, Death Scenes 2, Happy Merchant, Speak of the Devil, The Goddess Bunny
- Partner: Sandra Weinberg

Nicholas Arthur Bougas (born March 16, 1955) is an American documentary filmmaker and illustrator. Most of his films focused on Hollywood scandal and crime; his films include the 1989 mondo film Death Scenes. He directed two sequels to Death Scenes, as well as a profile of Satanist Anton LaVey in 1993, Speak of the Devil. He also directed a film focusing on the transgender artist Goddess Bunny, titled The Goddess Bunny.

He was an early murderabilia collector, collecting art from murderers, and corresponded with several notorious criminals, including Charles Manson. Bougas was a contributing editor and artist to the 1988 pro-Charles Manson book The Manson File, and directed a 1992 film on Manson. As an illustrator, Bougas worked with writer and publisher Jim Goad on his magazine Answer Me!, and contributed illustrations to the magazines Brutarian, Malefact, The Black Flame, and Exit. In the late 1990s, Bougas created Celebrities... At Their Worst!, a two volume audio collection of celebrity blunders, and featured on LaVey's 1995 studio album Satan Takes a Holiday as a vocalist.

As a cartoonist, he used the pen name A. Wyatt Mann to produce racist and antisemitic cartoons for the white supremacist newspaper WAR in the 1980s and 1990s, though his authorship was not confirmed until the 2010s. These cartoons are widely used as memes by white supremacists. Under the same pseudonym, Bougas illustrated Michael A. Hoffman II's Holocaust denial comic Tales of the Holohoax: A Journal of Satire.

== Early life ==
Nicholas Arthur Bougas was born in Savannah, Georgia on March 16, 1955, to parents Arthur Nicholas and Joyce Bougas (née Catarina). He attended Henderson High School in Chamblee, Georgia, and graduated in 1972.

He was raised in the Greek Orthodox Church; he later left the faith, but retrospectively described church attendance as "very entertaining" in its aesthetics and "Gothic feel". Speaking of the topics of his works, Bougas stated that he had always been interested in the "forbidden", and credited his interests to an early exposure to graphic newspaper tabloids.

== Career ==
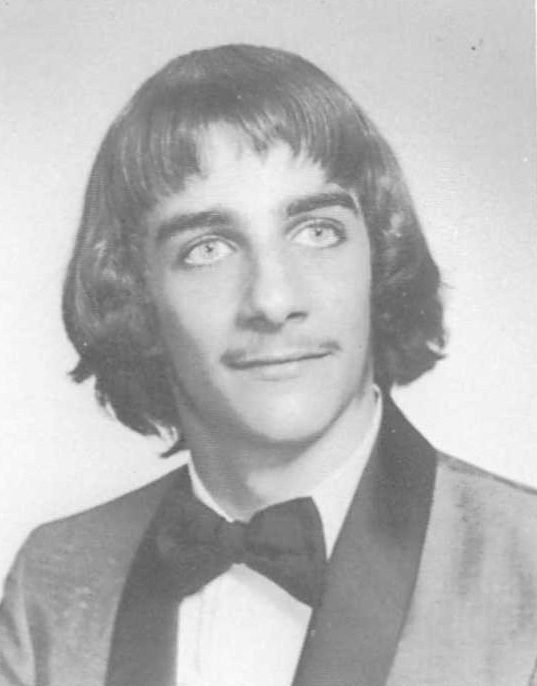
Bougas's 1972 yearbook photo at Henderson High School

In the 1970s, Bougas moved to California. From the 1980s to at least the late 1990s, Bougas was the manager of a film-focused bookstore called Movie World, initially located in the Golden Mall in Burbank, later in San Fernando, California. In 1987, Bougas began working for Wavelength Productions, a Burbank-based movie production company, as a researcher, editor, and later producer. He worked on several television documentaries, and Wavelength released many of his films. Bougas was in a long term relationship with Sandra Weinberg, who worked with him on his movies with Wavelength, including Death Scenes. While living in Los Angeles, Bougas worked as an illustrator for book and album covers.

In California, Bougas started collecting autographs of famous people, and then became interested in collecting the autographs of murderers. He had a large collection of memorabilia related to Hollywood and celebrities, in addition to collections related to serial killers and gangsters. Bougas became interested in collecting the art of killers, including Ottis Toole, Kenneth Bianchi, Henry Lee Lucas, and John Wayne Gacy. He was one of the earliest murderabilia collectors; according to The New Republic writer Alex Heard, Bougas was in large part responsible for starting the serial killer art collection fad. He was pen pals with several notorious criminals. Bougas was part of a network of people interested in the morbid and serial killers, also including Jim Goad, Parfrey, Boyd Rice, among others; they formed what Village Voice writer Devon Jackson described in 1994 as a "salon of death". His associate Jim Goad praised Bougas as the "professor emeritus" of serial killer enthusiasts. He was present at the 8/8/88 Nazi-Satanist rally, alongside several of his associates.

One murderer who responded to him was Charles Manson; Bougas struck up a correspondence with Manson in the early 1980s and befriended him. In 1994, he described Manson as "like a favorite uncle" to him. Manson sent him his art, and Bougas would frequently draw artwork of Manson. He argued in a 1994 interview that Manson was innocent. Writer Doug Brod noted Bougas as an influential figure in circles surrounding Charles Manson at this time. Bougas was a contributing editor for the 1988 pro-Charles Manson book The Manson File, edited by Nikolas Schreck and published by Adam Parfrey's Amok Press. The book included a number of his Manson drawings. He directed a film about Manson, Charles Manson Then and Now, in 1992, and went on a "pilgrimage" to the Manson murder sites.

Bougas was a close associate of Anton LaVey, the founder of the Church of Satan. He met LaVey through his daughter, Zeena LaVey. Bougas was a Satanist for a time. He was secular in his approach to Satanism. In the early 1990s, Bougas, Zeena, and Schreck (Zeena's husband) helped LaVey produce a video, Hail Satan! that explained his ideology to the public. Schreck disavowed the program shortly afterwards (calling it "not good"); it was never released, and Zeena and Schreck later ceased affiliation with the Church of Satan. In part a continuation of this project, in 1993, Bougas directed the documentary Speak of the Devil, a profile of LaVey. Adam Parfrey also assisted in making the film. In 1994 and 1995, Bougas designed cover art for the album release Manson Speaks, a CD of Manson audio.

Bougas described himself as a "gore hound"; while working at the book store, he was given a scrapbook made up of 1930s and 1940s crime photos. He first kept it as a coffee table book, but later created and directed the 1989 mondo film Death Scenes to preserve the photographs. The film was hosted and narrated by Anton LaVey. The photographs found by Bougas were later issued as its own book, edited by Sean Tejaratchi and with an introduction by Katherine Dunn, published by Feral House in 1996: Death Scenes: A Homicide Detective's Scrapbook. The film was followed by Death Scenes 2 in 1992, which focused on the Manson murders, and Death Scenes 3 in 1993.

His films largely focused on Hollywood celebrity scandal and graphic crime. He directed two films that focus on death in Hollywood stars: When the Applause Died and Death in Hollywood, both released in 1990. In 1994, Bougas made a film focusing on depictions of the crimes of serial killers, titled Serial Killers. Bougas created a short film series called Murderers, Mobsters, & Mayhem on similar topics; produced for mainstream television, these were less explicit, though focused on similar subject matter. Bougas directed several other films, such as the 1994 documentary The Goddess Bunny about disabled transgender artist Sandie Crisp. The Internet meme "Obey the Walrus" was created based on footage from this film. The same year, he directed Gay! Gay! Hollywood, a documentary focusing on the lives of gay (or allegedly gay) Hollywood stars. He appeared in the 1994 documentary The Vampire Interviews, a look at cultural depictions of vampires, directed by Ted Newsom.

As an illustrator, Bougas worked with writer and publisher Jim Goad on Answer Me!, an anti-"political correctness" magazine that ran from 1991 to 1994. He also occasionally drew covers for the Church of Satan's magazine, The Black Flame, and contributed illustrations to Adam Parfrey and George Petros's magazine Exit, Tom Crites's magazine Malefact, and the magazine Brutarian. He was the co-creator of illustrations for the neo-Nazi James Mason's 2000 book, When We Were All Jews.

Bougas provided vocals for the track "Thunderball" from S.W.A.T. (Adam Parfrey)'s 1994 album Deep Inside A Cop's Mind, and several tracks on LaVey's 1995 studio album Satan Takes a Holiday. In 1998, Bougas released the first volume of Celebrities... At Their Worst!, a collection of comedic audio blunders by such celebrities as Elvis Presley, Casey Kasem, Paul Anka, and John Wayne. It was released by the label Mad Deadly Worldwide Communist Gangster Computer God. He released a second volume in 1999.

He was a member of the "Unpop Art" movement, an art collective formed in 2003 by Brian Clark, Shaun Partridge, and Boyd Rice; members of the movement shared Bougas's fascination with morbid, racist, and violent topics, including Charles Manson, through the lens of pop culture.

=== A. Wyatt Mann ===
Bougas used the pseudonym "A. Wyatt Mann" (phonetically: 'a white man') to produce overtly racist and antisemitic cartoons in the late 1980s and early 1990s. They were first published in the white supremacist newspaper WAR, operated by Tom Metzger. Besides black people and Jews, his cartoons occasionally targeted other minorities and groups, including gay people and feminists. He began contributing in 1989; by the second issue he contributed to, a whole page was devoted to his cartoons, asking the reader to "Post 'em… Copy 'em... Color 'em… Spread 'em around!". Bougas's cartoons were later collected into booklets and sold through the newspaper. Scholar Uffa Jensen wrote that "all of the images published in WAR are deeply disturbing, radically racist or antisemitic", but that Bougas's were "the most aggressive and derogative".

The Mann cartoons have been widely reused as memes in original context by white supremacists, various internet trolls, and later, the alt-right. One cartoon in particular, a stereotypical caricature of a Jewish person referred to as the "Happy Merchant", became one of the most popular antisemitic images on the internet. It has been reused, modified, and parodied multiple times, eventually becoming part of the visual language of websites such as 4chan. Other Mann cartoons from WAR have also become racist memes. This includes the anti-black phrase "bix nood" (meant to mock black vernacular), which comes from a Mann cartoon featuring a black person talking indecipherable gibberish into a phone. The Mann cartoon "Hey Rabbi, Watcha' Doing?" has also become a meme; it features a Jewish man in a trench coat painting a swastika onto a synagogue wall at night, accusing Jews of committing fake hate crimes against themselves. It is also used as a phrase separate from the cartoon. Both "Hey Rabbi, Watcha' Doing?" and the "Happy Merchant" cartoons are considered hate symbols by the Anti-Defamation League.

Bougas' work as Mann has frequently been combined by Internet trolls with cartoons by political cartoonist Ben Garrison, which Garrison said generates confusion between the two artists. Separate from the WAR cartoons, Bougas also used the A. Wyatt Mann name to illustrate the 1989 antisemitic Holocaust denial comic Tales of the Holohoax: A Journal of Satire, written by Michael A. Hoffman II. Under his own name, Bougas had illustrated Hoffman's 1988 novel, A Candidate for the Order, which focuses on a racial apocalypse.

Bougas being the person behind the pseudonym was suspected, though this was not confirmed for many years. Another suspect was the white supremacist and WAR managing editor Wyatt Kaldenberg (Kaldenberg being a white supremacist involved in the WAR paper, and named Wyatt). Kaldenberg denied this in 2014, saying he had "never drawn a cartoon in [his] life", and that it was "Nick Bogus [sic]". Bougas had until then never confirmed his authorship; however, his identity as Mann was confirmed in 2015 by multiple people who worked with him (including Schreck, Parfrey, and Kaldenberg), and in captions of photos taken at various events. According to a 2025 analysis, Bougas had until then neither confirmed nor denied that he was A. Wyatt Mann. In 1994, his associate Jim Goad said that Bougas's racial views would "peel the paint off any wall", while Adam Parfrey said that Bougas largely agreed with Tom Metzger, the publisher of his cartoons.

On his official website in 2025, "A. Wyatt Mann" gave an interview, stating that he was from Georgia, had moved to Los Angeles, had been in correspondence with various criminals, had illustrated for companies like Feral House, Loompanics, and Answer Me!, and that he was the director of several films, including Speak of the Devil and Death Scenes; he admitted that his "true identity is easy to find online", but he preferred to keep his body of works under both names separate. He wrote that he had begun the A. Wyatt Mann cartoons in the mid-1980s, with them later being picked up by Metzger, and that his purpose in cartooning had been to "tweak the noses of the squishy White idiots who would bristle at in-your-face stereotypical depictions of the hood rats they worshipped". Upon discovering the popularity of his art on the internet, he drew his own new variations and contributed them anonymously on sites like 8chan.

== Works ==
=== Filmography ===
| Year | Title | Functioned as | | | | Notes |
| Year | Title | Director | Producer | Editor | Writer | Notes |
|---|---|---|---|---|---|---|
| 1989 | Death Scenes | Yes | Yes | No | Yes | |
| 1990 | When the Applause Died | Yes | Yes | No | No | |
| 1990 | Death in Hollywood | Yes | Yes | No | No | |
| 1992 | Death Scenes 2 | Yes | Yes | No | Yes | |
| 1992 | Sinatra: An Unauthorized Biography of the Legend | Yes | Yes | No | No | |
| 1992 | Charles Manson Then and Now | Yes | Yes | No | Yes | |
| 1993 | Death Scenes 3 | Yes | No | No | No | |
| 1993 | Burn Baby Burn: Riots and Violence in the Modern World | Yes | No | Yes | No | |
| 1993 | Speak of the Devil | Yes | Yes | Yes | No | |
| 1994 | The Goddess Bunny | Yes | No | Yes | No | |
| 1994 | Serial Killers | Yes | No | No | Yes | |
| 1994 | The Vampire Interviews | No | No | No | No | Interview appearance, credited as himself |
| 1994 | Gay! Gay! Hollywood | Yes | Yes | No | No | |
| 1996 | Blood Slaves of the Vampire Wolf | No | No | No | No | Actor (cameo appearance) |

=== Discography ===
- Deep Inside A Cop's Mind (1994; by S.W.A.T. (Adam Parfrey), featured as a vocalist on "Thunderball")
- Satan Takes a Holiday (1995; by Anton LaVey, with Bougas as a vocalist)
- Celebrities... At Their Worst! (1998)
- Celebrities... At Their Worst! Volume 2 (1999)

=== Bibliography ===
- Schreck, Nikolas, ed. (1988). The Manson File. Associate editors are Boyd Rice, Nick Bougas, Jimmi Rocket, John Aes-Nihil, and Jack Stevenson. New York: Amok Press. ISBN 0-941693-04-X.
  - Aes-Nihil, John; ——; Parfrey, Adam; Rice, Boyd; Rocket, Jimmi; Schreck, Nikolas; Stevenson, Jack, eds. (2011). The Manson File: Charles Manson As Revealed in Letters, Photos, Stories, Songs, Art, Testimony and Documents. Port Townsend: Feral House. ISBN 978-1-936239-36-8.
- Hoffman, Michael A. II (1988). A Candidate for the Order. Illustrated by Nick Bougas. New York; Los Angeles: New Traditionalist Press. ISBN 0-929903-00-5. OCLC 41781073.
- Hoffman, Michael A. II (1989). Tales of the Holohoax: A Journal of Satire. Illustrated by A. W. Mann. Temecula: Wiswell Ruffin House. OCLC 456104664.
- Mason, James (April 2000). When We Were All Jews. Art and graphics by D. M. Worley and Nick Bougas. Denver: Self-published.
