= Jim Goad =

American author and publisher (born 1961)

- Born: James Thaddeus Goad; 1960 or 1961 (age 65–66); Ridley Park, Pennsylvania, U.S.
- Occupations: Author; Publisher
- Known for: Answer Me! The Redneck Manifesto; Shit Magnet; Whiteness: The Original Sin (2018)
- Spouse: Debbie Goad (m. 1987–1997)

James Thaddeus Goad (1960 or 1961) is an American author and publisher. Goad co-authored and published the magazine Answer Me! and The Redneck Manifesto.

== Early life and education ==
James Thaddeus Goad was born in Ridley Park, Pennsylvania in 1960 or 1961. He grew up in Philadelphia, describing himself as a loner, misanthrope and weirdo. He attended a Catholic school run by nuns. He experienced violent treatment from his parents and bullies at his school, eventually learning to fight back.

Goad moved to New York City to study acting and was accepted to study at New York University under Stella Adler. Goad graduated in 1985 with a B.A. in Journalism from Temple University while living in New Jersey. In the early 1980s, Goad met Debbie Rosalie, who was eight years older, in New York. They relocated to Los Angeles and were married in 1987.

== Career ==
=== 1980s–90s ===
Goad worked at the Los Angeles Reader, covering local news, but wished to cover more fringe subjects, so the couple began publishing their own magazine, Answer Me! In 1994, Goad featured on Adam Parfrey's 1994 cop-themed album, Deep Inside a Cop's Mind.

Around 1994, the couple moved to Portland, Oregon and Goad devoted his time to writing. In May 1997, Goad began dating then-stripper Anne "Skye" Ryan about the time that Debbie was diagnosed with the ovarian cancer that later killed her. Goad described Ryan as "Sweet Dracula girl" and as being "...fifteen years younger than me and a thousand times more fucked-up." In November 1997, Debbie was granted a restraining order against Goad, after stating that he had hit, kicked, and spit on her and threatened to kill her. They divorced in December 1997.

In May 1998, Goad and Ryan had a fight in Goad's car outside of Portland. Goad left Ryan by the side of the road and fled to Washington state. When police met Ryan in a hospital emergency room, she had a blackened eye that was swollen shut, "bite marks on her hand and she was bleeding in several places." Goad was charged with assault and kidnapping, facing a potential 25 years in prison. After his arrest, Goad's ex-wife Debbie filed a motion to withdraw her restraining order, stating that Goad "has seeked counseling for three months and we are now friends after our legal divorce…. If I have a relapse from my ovarian cancer, [Jim] will take care of me and help me out."

Goad pleaded guilty to reduced charges and served 2 1/2 years, split between jail and prison. He was released in the fall of 2000. When asked if he had any remorse or guilt about beating Ryan, Goad said, "Absolutely not. I enjoyed it."

While Goad was in prison, author Jim Hogshire started a "Free Jim Goad" website, claiming that Goad told him he was innocent. After his release, Goad disputed the concept of the website, calling Hogshire a "nutty Muslim junkie." He stated that while he had said Ryan was lying, he never claimed innocence, but was not able to speak freely while incarcerated.

=== 2000s ===
Upon his release from prison in 2000, Goad returned to Portland and was on parole for a time. He wrote for Exotic, a free guide to the sex industry of the Northwestern United States and worked as a country music DJ. In 2008 Goad became a father.

== Works ==
=== Writing style and beliefs ===
As a writer, Jim Goad has been called the "poster boy for the transgressive school of writing." Chuck Palahniuk describes Goad's writing style as being "brutally honest without worrying about being correct."

Goad's work examines American culture, often popular and political culture. His early work reads anti-politically correct and as shock value, while his later work, like the Redneck Manifesto, and journalism contributions have marked Goad as a political and societal commentator. In his political commentary he has described conservatives and liberals in the United States as "two asscheeks surrounding the same hairy bunghole," and that politicians know how to take advantage of lower- and middle-class people because of a human's innate tribalism. He has stated his support for Donald Trump.

==== ANSWER Me! ====
From 1991 to 1994, Goad self-published four yearly issues of the zine ANSWER Me!, with then-wife Debbie Goad. It featured illustrations by Nick Bougas. With a circulation of 13,000 the magazine sought to upset politically correct thinkers by covering subjects about race and feminism. The publication was banned and seized by customs officials in several countries, and the final Rape Issue was rejected by some bookstore owners. The zine, called "massively influential" by Bizarre, would also be credited as an inspiration by Francisco Martin Duran, who opened fire at the White House, influencing the suicides of three British neo-Nazis, and a possible influence on Kurt Cobain's suicide.

==== The Redneck Manifesto ====
In 1994, Goad signed a two-book deal with Simon & Schuster for $100,000. The Redneck Manifesto: How Hillbillies, Hicks, and White Trash Became America's Scapegoats was published in 1997. The book explores the idea of poor whites celebrating their heritage similar to poor African Americans, and that discrimination in the United States is focused around social class, not race. His thesis is that the rich elite blind the poor, and cause them to fight one another, instead of working together for their mutual benefit.

==== Shit Magnet ====
Shit Magnet: One Man's Miraculous Ability to Absorb the World's Guilt, is Goad's second book. Major New York publishing houses declined to publish Shit Magnet, and it was published in 2002 by Feral House. The book, written while Goad was in prison, is an autobiography. It examines Goad's childhood, teenage years, his relationships with former wife Debbie Goad and ex-girlfriend Anne Ryan, and reflections about his time in prison and his experience with the judicial system. The book includes great detail about Oregon prison life, including detailed descriptions about fellow prisoners, of whom he writes "forced sterilization maybe wasn't such a bad idea." Writer John Strausbaugh described Shit Magnet as "extremely painful" in detail and comparative in drama to the autobiography of Klaus Kinski. Humor is Dead calls Shit Magnet a "sordid and often shocking personal allegory of guilt and violence." In 2008, a play titled "Torn Between Two Bitches," was produced in Los Angeles by Michael Sargent, based on Shit Magnet.

==== Other work ====
Goad wrote a comic called Trucker Fags in Denial, which was originally published as a comic strip in the Portland-based publication Exotic and was published as a comic book by Fantagraphics in 2004. The comic, written by Goad and illustrated by Jim Blanchard, is about two truckers named Butch and Petey. The two characters are homophobic and beat up gays between trucking. The characters contradict their behavior by having a homosexual relationship with each other. Goad came up with the idea for the comic while in prison, where he frequently observed male prisoners insulting each other as being "fags," and as "fagging off,' despite engaging in homosexual acts themselves while incarcerated. Willamette Week's gay columnist Byron Beck described Trucker Fags in Denial as "twisted, vile, unrepentant ... and absolutely hilarious."

In 2007, Jim Goad's Gigantic Book of Sex was published. The book consists of over 100 articles, op-eds and facts about sex, all written by Goad. Goad has also contributed to Hustler.

== Acting and music ==
Jim Goad released music and performed as Big Red Goad, performing covers of classic and trucker-themed country songs. In 2007 he toured as the opening act for Hank III.

In 2002, Goad acted in The Suzy Evans Story, a film about a police detective who protects a battered woman named Suzy and proceeds to abuse her himself. Goad joked that it was typecasting. The film was never released.

== Political views ==
Goad is referred to as the "godfather of the new right" and is associated with the alt-right movement, with Proud Boys figure Gavin McInnes citing him as one of his favorite writers. Goad does not consider himself part of the alt-right movement, although he has made appearances with various figures commonly associated with the alt-right movement: Goad has previously been a guest on "Rebel Yell", a podcast associated with the neo-confederate propaganda group "Identity Dixie", an organization that helped organize the 2017 Unite the Right rally in Charlottesville, Virginia.

== Works ==
- Goad, Jim. The Redneck Manifesto: How Hillbillies, Hicks, and White Trash Became America's Scapegoats. New York: Simon & Schuster (1998). ISBN 0-684-83864-8
- Goad, Jim. Shit Magnet: One Man's Miraculous Ability to Absorb the World's Guilt. Port Townsend: Feral House (2002). ISBN 0-922915-77-6
- Goad, Jim & Blanchard, Jim. Trucker Fags in Denial. Seattle: Fantagraphics (2004).
- Goad, Jim. ANSWER Me!: The First Three. Baltimore: Scapegoat Publishing (2006). ISBN 0-9764035-3-6
- Goad, Jim. Jim Goad's Gigantic Book of Sex. Port Townsend: Feral House (2007). ISBN 1-932595-20-1
- Goad, Jim & Kopp, Hollister. Gun Fag Manifesto: Entertainment for the Armed Sociopath. Nine Banded Books/Underworld Amusements (2013). ISBN 978-0-9896972-0-0
- Goad, Jim. The Headache Factory: True Tales of Online Obsession and Madness. New York: Thought Catalog Books (2014).
- Goad, Jim. Potatoes on the Moon: I Spent a Week Probing the Alien Landscape of Idaho. (2015)
- Goad, Jim. Life Never Ends Well: A Cavalcade of Murders, Suicides, Accidental Deaths, & Tragic Endings. (2016)
- Goad, Jim. The New Church Ladies: The Extremely Uptight World of "Social Justice" (2017). ISBN 978-0692847213
- Goad, Jim. Whiteness: The Original Sin. (2018)
- Goad, Jim. The Bomb Inside My Brain. (2019). ISBN 978-1089137788
- Goad, Jim. Gender Psychosis. (2020). ISBN 979-8668207374

== Discography ==
- Deep Inside a Cop's Mind (1994, Amphetamine Reptile)
- Truck Drivin' Psycho 1996 (World Serpent)
- "Let's Fight!" with Jim Goad 2001 (Exotic)
- Hatesville, The Boyd Rice Experience, 2009 (Caciocavallo)
