= Henderson High School (Georgia) =

Defunct high school in Georgia, United States

Coordinates: 33.8669°N 84.2522°W

Location
- 2830 Henderson Mill Rd; DeKalb County, Georgia 30341; United States

Information
- Type: Public high school
- Established: 1967
- Closed: 1996
- School district: DeKalb County School District

Henderson High School was a public high school in DeKalb County, Georgia that was converted to a middle school in 1996.

== History ==
In 1967, John C. Portman Jr. designed the building for Henderson High School.

In 1985, a student at Henderson High School was awarded as part of the Presidential Scholars Program.

In 1990, Ruth Marcus of The Washington Post wrote that "Four years ago, officials at Atlanta's Henderson High School told eighth grader Will Hinton that he and his friends in the Fellowship of Christian Athletes would have to drop 'Christian' from the group's name if they wanted to continue holding their prayer meetings and Bible study sessions on school grounds. In the next few years, Hinton said, school administrators cracked down harder -- ordering the students to hold their meetings off campus, barring them from announcing the gatherings over the school's public address system and threatening to kick Hinton off the yearbook if it portrayed the group." In 1990, the Supreme Court ruled on the case Westside Community Board of Education v. Mergens, in which "the court upheld the constitutionality of a 1984 federal law requiring high schools that offer extracurricular activities to provide religious clubs equal access to school facilities -- Henderson administrators approved a poster advertising an off-campus meeting of the Fellowship of Christian Athletes."

In 1996, the Henderson High School building was reopened as Henderson Middle School.

== Notable alumni ==
- Nick Bougas (1955–2026), filmmaker
- Pete Ladd (1956–2023), baseball pitcher
- Thomas Marshburn (born 1960), astronaut
- Eric Boe (born 1964), astronaut]
