= Michael A. Hoffman II =

American author and Holocaust denier

- Born: Michael Anthony Hoffman II; 1957 (age 68–69); Geneva, New York
- Education: State University of New York at Oswego
- Occupation: Author
- Organization(s): Independent History and Research
- Known for: Conspiracy theories; Holocaust denial
- Children: 9
- Website: www.revisionisthistory.org

Michael Anthony Hoffman II (born 1957) is an American author. He has been described as a conspiracy theorist and a Holocaust denier.

== Early life ==
Hoffman was born in 1957 Geneva, New York, to a Catholic family. Hoffman studied at the State University of New York at Oswego in the Finger Lakes region.

Hoffman supposedly was taught about William Morgan, whose disappearance in 1826 resulted in the formation of the Anti-Masonic Party by his maternal grandfather, who told him that elections in the United States were rigged by organized crime. From this, Hoffman was said to have deduced that "[n]othing is as it seems to be", which, in turn, led to a "life-long vocation, researching the subterranean workings of the occult cryptocracy's orchestration of American history".

== Career ==
He worked as a reporter for the Albany, New York, bureau of the Associated Press. In the 1970s, he wrote for the UK-based magazine Fortean Times, before, in the 1980s, writing for Willis Carto's far-right newspaper, The Spotlight. Hoffman was the Assistant Director of the Institute for Historical Review (IHR) in 1986, an organization controlled by Carto, a premier historical revisionist organization with a particular focus on Holocaust denial. He left after a year after getting into a dispute with other IHR members. He proceeded to affiliate with the Australian holocaust denial publisher Veritas Press; soon after, he left after disputes developed with the organization, including a fallout between Hoffman and David Irving.

For a time he worked with the white supremacist Tom Metzger and his White Aryan Resistance group, but then came to have a falling out with him too. In 1996, Hoffman moved with his family to northern Idaho. There, he hoped to establish a museum that would detail the "Communist holocaust against Christians" (i. e., the persecution of Christians in the Soviet Union), "the holocaust against the Germans", (i. e., the bombing of Dresden and other major German cities in World War II), and the "Holocaust against Japan" (i.e., the bombing of Tokyo, and the atomic bombings of Hiroshima and Nagasaki).

He launched several of his own organizations, including Independent History and Research and Campaign for Radical Truth in History. He also started his own web newsletter, Hoffman Wire. In the 2010s, he wrote for the Lutheran newspaper Christian News of New Haven, Missouri.

== Views and works ==
=== Holocaust denial and the Jews ===
His interests include the alleged occult roots of Freemasonry, the ideology of shadow government, Fortean phenomena, and traditional Judaism. Hoffman has been described as a "Holocaust denier and anti-Semitic ideologue" by Michael Barkun of Syracuse University and Michael Whine. Swedish historian of Uppsala University Mattias Gardell has asserted: "Antisemitism is prominent [...] in the worldview of Michael Hoffman II".

Stephen E. Atkins, in his book, Holocaust Denial as an International Movement (2009), wrote that Hoffman's newsletter Revisionist History promotes Holocaust denial, and Hoffman contends that "the real Holocaust of World War II was deaths caused by the Allies". He quotes Hoffman denying the existence of the usage of gas chambers by Nazi Germany: "[T]here is no material scientific proof for the existence of Nazi homicidal gas chambers. There are no autopsies available from any source showing that even one Jew died as a result of Zyklon B (hydrocyanic acid) poisoning, among the millions who are alleged to have been killed in this manner."

The Great Holocaust Trial: The Landmark Battle for the Right to Doubt the West's Most Sacred Relic (1985) is a sympathetic account of the 1980s Canadian trials of Ernst Zündel. At the time, Zündel was required to appear before the Canadian Human Rights Tribunal for "spreading false news", by distributing the Holocaust-denying pamphlet Did Six Million Really Die? in Canada. Hoffman's book argues that Holocaust denial material should be completely legal to publish, which is valid under the First Amendment in the United States, but not necessarily in other countries.

In 1989, he created a comic book that denied the Holocaust: Tales of the Holohoax: A Journal of Satire. It was illustrated by A. Wyatt Mann.

On his YouTube channel in 2016, Hoffman said: "Judaism's focus is on self-worship, people who worship themselves, and this is where I see a corollary with Nazis and with what Hitler was doing." He has claimed that Judaism has a positive view of pedophilia and advocates the hatred of non-Jews. In 2019, he was a co-chair of the Saviour' Day 2019 with Louis Farrakhan, propagating claims that early Jewish texts are equivalent to teachings "from the church of Satan".

=== Irish slavery myth ===
Hoffman is the author of They Were White and They Were Slaves: The Untold Story of Enslavement of Whites in Early America. The book was self-published in 1990.

According to Derrick Jensen, Hoffman is "overtly racist", and "attempts to make the case that the enslavement of whites by commercial interests in Britain and the Americas was worse than the enslavement and genocide of Africans ... perpetrated by those same interests". Jensen said, "Hoffman's analysis is seriously flawed", but that "his scholarship is impressive, and the story he tells is both interesting and horrifying".

The book's espousal of the Irish slaves myth is considered by Liam Hogan (interviewed by the Southern Poverty Law Center in 2016) as persuasive to white supremacists.

=== Cryptocracy ===
Hoffman is the author of Secret Societies and Psychological Warfare, which outlines his conspiracy theory of a shadow government or "cryptocracy" that gains power through manipulation of symbols and twilight language. Examples of such "psychodramas", in Hoffman's view, include Route 66 (which connects various centers of occult significance), and the assassination of President John F. Kennedy, in which Hoffman sees ritualistic elements. The theory of masonic symbolism in the assassination of President Kennedy was first articulated by James Shelby Downard, with whom Hoffman co-authored King/Kill-33, which became the inspiration for a song by Marilyn Manson.

Hoffman also states that this ruling cabal is slowly revealing itself through movies such as They Live, The Matrix, and other symbolic and subliminal communication. Hoffman has appeared on the Alex Jones radio show to discuss his theories. In a 2002 lecture in Sandpoint, Idaho, Hoffman analyzed the 9/11 terror attack in terms of human alchemy and psychological warfare.

In Secret Societies and Psychological Warfare, he focuses on the events of 9/11 as the culmination of a series of occult dates, including the cornerstone placing of the Statue of Liberty's pedestal; the World Trade Center ground-breaking; the Pentagon ground-breaking; the attacks in New York and Arlington/Washington, perceiving that all were connected to Sirius, the Dog Star: "It would be difficult to exaggerate the fanatical degree of attachment the priesthood of Egypt and all subsequent related Hermetic traditions had for Sirius."

== Personal life ==
Hoffman is married, and has 9 children.

== Publications ==
Hoffman is the author of these books, primarily self-published:

- —— (1985). The Great Holocaust Trial. Torrance: Institute for Historical Review. ISBN 0-939484-22-6. OCLC 13397597.
- —— (1988). A Candidate for the Order. Illustrated by Nick Bougas. New York; Los Angeles: New Traditionalist Press. ISBN 0-929903-00-5. OCLC 41781073. A novel.
- —— (1989). Tales of the Holohoax: A Journal of Satire. Illustrated by A. W. Mann. Temecula: Wiswell Ruffin House. OCLC 456104664.
- —— (1990). They Were White, and They Were Slaves: The Untold History of the Enslavement of Whites in Early America. Dresden: Wiswell Ruffin House. ISBN 0-929903-01-3. OCLC 64023303.
- —— (1995). Secret Societies and Psychological Warfare. Coeur d'Alene: Independent History and Research. OCLC 41073851.
- —— (2000). Judaism's Strange Gods. Coeur d'Alene: Independent History and Research. ISBN 0-9703784-0-8. OCLC 48962230.
- ——; Lieberman, Moshe (2002). The Israeli Holocaust Against the Palestinians. Coeur d'Alene: Independent History and Research. ISBN 0-9703784-2-4. OCLC 50660344.
- —— (2008). Judaism Discovered: A Study of the Anti-Biblical Religion of Racism, Self-Worship, Superstition, and Deceit. Coeur d'Alene: Independent History and Research. ISBN 978-0-9703784-5-3. OCLC 607347295.
- —— (2013). Usury in Christendom: The Mortal Sin that Was and Now is Not. Coeur d'Alene: Independent History and Research. ISBN 978-0-9703784-9-1. OCLC 820963146.
- —— (2017). The Occult Renaissance Church of Rome. Coeur d'Alene: Independent History and Research. ISBN 978-0-9909547-2-9. OCLC 1027533508.
- —— (2019). Adolf Hitler: Enemy of the German People. Coeur d'Alene: Independent History and Research. ISBN 978-0-9909547-4-3. OCLC 1139764087.
- —— (2021). Twilight Language. Coeur d'Alene: Independent History and Research. ISBN 978-0-9909547-5-0. OCLC 1344518074.

Hoffman has also written the introductions for modern reprints, which he also published, of:

- The Traditions of the Jews by Johann Andreas Eisenmenger
- The Talmud Tested by Alexander McCaul, D. D.
