= Ernst Friedrich =

German anarchist and pacifist (1894–1967)

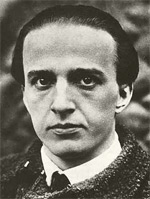
Ernst Friedrich at the age of 30

Ernst Friedrich (25 February 1894 – 2 May 1967) was a German anarcho-pacifist.

== Life ==
=== Childhood and youth ===
Ernst Friedrich was born in Breslau (now Wrocław, Poland) as the 13th child of a cleaning lady and a saddler. After finishing elementary school, he started an apprenticeship as a bookprinter in 1908. Soon after, he quit the apprenticeship and started studying acting. He earned money by working in a factory. He was one of the founders of the Breslau Association for Youth Workers. In 1911, he became a member of the Social Democratic Party of Germany. From 1912 until 1914 he travelled in Denmark, Sweden, Norway and Switzerland. In 1914, he made his acting debut in his hometown and had a performance at the royal theater in Potsdam.

=== World War I ===
He was drafted in World War I and decided to become a conscientious objector. As a result, he was admitted to a mental hospital. He was convicted of sabotage of military activities and imprisoned in Potsdam in 1917. At the end of 1918 he came free due to the German Revolution of 1918–1919.

=== Weimar Republic ===
Friedrich was actively involved in the Spartacist uprising. After the end of the war, he was a member of the youth organisation Freie sozialistische Jugend by Karl Liebknecht and Rosa Luxemburg. After its dissolution in 1920, he founded his own anarchist youth group "Freie Jugend" in Berlin. The group was also founded in Preußen, Sachsen, Thüringen, Rheinland, Westfalen as well as in Austria and Switzerland. The magazine Freie Jugend connected the different groups and was published by Friedrich until 1926. From 1923 on, the group fusioned with the Syndikalistisch-Anarchistische Jugend Deutschlands (SAJD), an anarcho-syndicalist youth movement that promoted antimilitarism. In between the two World Wars, he was an antimilitarist activist. Among other activities, he was a speaker at an anti-war demonstration in front of Berlin Cathedral on 31 July 1921 that had over 100,000 participants.

His flat in Friedrichshain became a meeting place and a commune for young anarchists. In 1925, he founded the Anti-Kriegs-Museum (Anti-War Museum) in Berlin, because he wanted to create a space for peace education. His most famous book Krieg dem Kriege ("War against War"), which was published in 1924, was a direct result of his research for the museum. It shows the atrocities of war in pictures.

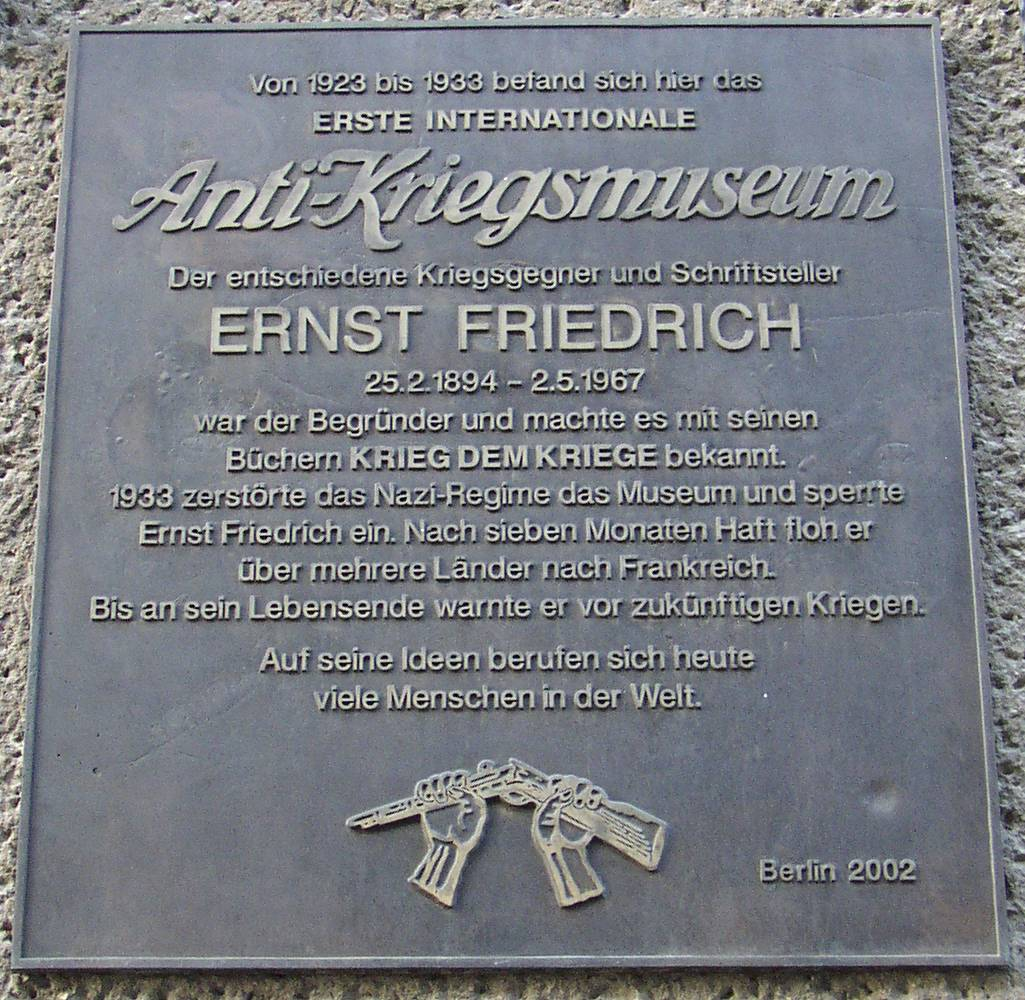
Memorial plate in Berlin-Mitte (Parochialstr. 1–3)

Later he published the weekly magazine "Die schwarze Fahne" ("The Black Flag") which had a circulation of up to 40,000 copies.

Friedrich was close friends with Henry Jacoby and Erich Mühsam. Jacoby called him in retrospect an "apostle of a radical youth movement, prophet of an anti-hierarchical socialism [and] aggressive antimilitarist". As editor of the magazine "Freie Jugend" he dedicated a number of the magazine in 1924 to the political prisoners of the Weimar Republic, among them Erich Mühsam.

His publications were often banned or confiscated and Friedrich was regularly charged with different offences. The lawyer Hans Litten defended him on several occasions. On 14 November 1930, he was sentenced to one year in jail due to his political activities. He was involved in the distribution of antimilitarist texts among police and military.

=== Third Reich and World War II ===
He was a victim of Nazi terror already before Hitler's rise to power in 1933. He was the victim of violent assaults by the Sturmabteilung regularly and the windows of his museum were destroyed so often that he could not find insurance for it anymore. After the Reichstag fire he was arrested on 28 February 1933. The museum was demolished by the Nazis and turned into a Sturmabteilung facility. After his release he escaped to other European countries in December 1933. For some time he was able to hide in the Quaker project Rest Home.

In 1936, he opened a new museum in Brussels, which was again destroyed after the German invasion of Belgium in 1940. Ernst Friedrich escaped with his son, also called Ernst, to France. There he was arrested by the Vichy regime and became a prisoner in the St. Cyprien camp, and afterwards in the Gurs internment camp. After 18 months, he was able to escape. In 1943, he was discovered by the Gestapo. He escaped once more and became a member of the French Resistance. Close to the village Barre-des-Cévennes in the Département Lozère he ran the farm "La Castelle" together with his second wife Marthe Saint-Pierre. Friedrich fought in the liberation of Nîmes and Alès. He was wounded twice. He saved about 70 children of a Jewish children's home from being deported.

=== After World War II ===
After the war, Friedrich became a member of the French Socialist Party. Since 1947, he was working on building up a new anti-war museum in Paris.

He received a grant of 1,000 dollars from an international foundation. He bought a boat and turned it into the peace boat Arche de Noé ("Noah's Ark"). He parked it at the Seine island at Villeneuve-la-Garenne. He published three numbers of the magazine Bordbrief from 1950 until 1953.

In 1954 he received compensation money for losing his property and for his wounds due to the Third Reich. With this money, he bought 3,000 m^{2} of forest on a Seine island close to Le Perreux-sur-Marne. There he built an international youth center in 1954. From 1961 on, it was a youth center for working youth.

Towards the end of his life he was suffering from severe depression. His grave is at the 5th division of the cemetery of Le Perreux-sur-Marne, Val-de-Marne.

== Legacy ==
The island he bought was sold after his death. His literary estate was destroyed.

In 1982, the anti-war museum in Berlin was reopened.

== Writings ==
- Proletarischer Kindergarten. Ein Märchen- und Lesebuch für Kinder. Illustrations by Käthe Kollwitz, Karl Holtz, Otto Nagel and others. Buchverlag der Arbeiter-Kunst-Ausstellung, Berlin 1921.
- Krieg dem Kriege! Guerre à la guerre. War against War. 2 volumes. Verlag Freie Jugend, Berlin 1924 and 1926.
- Festung Gollnow (part of the series Menschen im Käfig). With pictures by Svend Nielsen. Kulturverlag, Berlin 1932.
- Das Anti-Kriegsmuseum. Berlin 1926.
- Vom Friedensmuseum zur Hitlerkaserne. Ein Tatsachenbericht über das Wirken von Ernst Friedrich und Adolf Hitler (autobiography), Schwarz, St. Gallen / Genossenschafts-Buchhandlung, Zurich 1935.

Editor of the following magazines:

- Freie Jugend (1919–1926)
- Die Waffen nieder! (1921)
- Der freie Mensch (1924)
- Schwarze Fahne (1925–1929)
- Bordbrief (1950–1953)

== See also ==
- Anarchism in Germany

== Bibliography ==
- Christian Bartolf, Dominique Miething: Ernst Friedrich (1894–1967). In: Thomas Friedrich (Hrsg.): Handbuch Anarchismus. Springer VS, Wiesbaden 2023.online
- Thomas Kegel: "Krieg dem Krieg!" Ernst Friedrich – Anarchist und revolutionärer Antimilitarist. In: Graswurzelrevolution, Heft 115, June 1986
- Thomas Kegel: Ernst Friedrich. Anarchistische Pädagogik in Aktion. In: Ulrich Klemm (ed.): Anarchismus und Pädagogik. Studien zur Rekonstruktion einer vergessenen Tradition, pp. 126–137. Dipa Verlag, Frankfurt am Main 1991
- Ulrich Klemm: Ernst Friedrich. In: Hans Jürgen Degen (ed.): Lexikon der Anarchie. Verlag Schwarzer Nachtschatten, Bösdorf/Plön 1993 ISBN 3890410081
- Ulrich Linse: Die anarchistische und anarcho-syndikalistische Jugendbewegung, 1918–1933. Dipa Verlag, Frankfurt am Main 1976
- Ulrich Linse: Ernst Friedrich zum 10. Todestag (= Europäische Ideen, Heft 29). Verlag Europäische Ideen, Berlin 1977
- Nicolas Offenstadt: L'image contre la guerre. Autour d'Ernst Friedrich. In: Thérèse Blondet-Bisch, Robert Frank, Claire Lebeau (ed.): Voir. Ne pas voir la guerre. Histoire des représentations photographiques de la guerre, pp. 270–275. Somogy, éditions d'Art/BDIC, Paris 2001 ISBN 2702845622
- Tommy Spree: Ich kenne keine "Feinde". Der Pazifist Ernst Friedrich. Ein Lebensbild. Anti-Kriegs-Museum, Selbstverlag, Berlin 2000
- Bérénice Zunino: Pacifisme et violence. Femmes et enfants dans la pédagogie de la paix d'Ernst Friedrich. In: Les cahiers Irice, ISSN 1967-2713, Jg. 4 (2011), Heft 2, pp. 111–136
