= Henry Sylvester Jacoby =

American educator

Henry Sylvester Jacoby (born 1857, died 1955) was an American educator, born at Springtown, Bucks County, Pennsylvania, He was graduated from Lehigh University in 1877 and during the season of 1878 was connected with the topographical corps of the Pennsylvania Geological Survey. During 1879–85, he was chief draftsman in the United States Engineer's Office in Memphis, Tenn. In 1886, he returned to Lehigh, where until 1890 he was instructor of civil engineering; he then accepted a call to Cornell University, where in 1897 he became professor of bridge engineering. Professor Jacoby was a fellow of the American Association for the Advancement of Science and in 1901 presided over the Section on Engineering, with the rank of vice-president, and was president of the Society for the Promotion of Engineering Education in 1915–16. Besides numerous papers on his specialty of bridge engineering, he was the author of:

- Notes and Problems in Descriptive Geometry (1892)
- Outlines of Descriptive Geometry (Part I, 1895; 2, 1896; 3, 1897)
- Text-Book in Plain Lettering (1897) with Mansfield Merriman
- Text Book on Roofs and Bridges (1890-8) with R. P. Davis
- Foundations of Bridges and Buildings (1914) with Roland Parker Davis
- Structural Details, or Elements of Design in Timber Framing (1919)
