= Shadow government (conspiracy theory) =

Family of conspiracy theories

The shadow government, also referred to as cryptocracy, secret government, or invisible government, is the subject of a family of theories based on the notion that real and actual political power resides not only with publicly elected representatives but with private individuals who are exercising power behind the scenes, beyond the scrutiny of democratic institutions. According to this belief, the official elected government is subservient to the shadow government, which is the true executive power.

Some of the groups proposed by these theories as constituting the shadow government include central banks, Freemasons, communists, Nazis, the Rothschilds, intelligence agencies, think tanks, organized Jewry, the Vatican, Jesuits, or Catholics in general, as well as secret societies, moneyed interests, extraterrestrials, Satanists, and globalist elites and supranational organizations who seek to manipulate policy in their own interest or in order to serve a larger agenda that is hidden from the general public.

== History ==
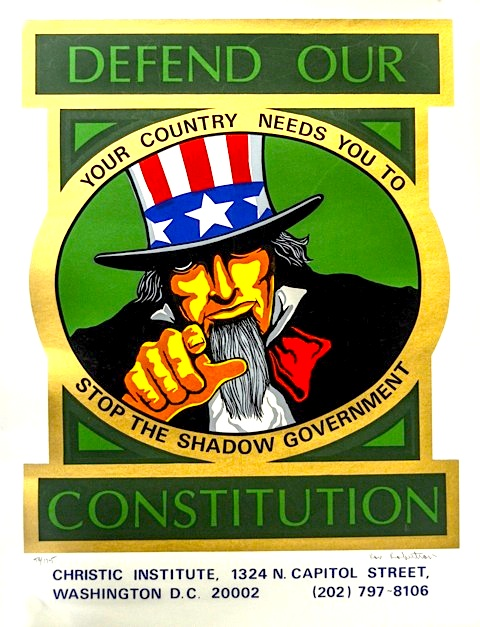
A poster from the Christic Institute, active from 1980 to 1991, that says "stop the shadow government"

Literature on the subject postulates the existence of a secret government which is the true power behind the apparent government. Examples of such literature include works by Dan Smoot, William Guy Carr, Jim Marrs, Carroll Quigley, Gary Allen, Alex Jones, Des Griffin, G. Edward Griffin, David Icke, and Michael A. Hoffman II. Some of these authors believe members of the secret government may represent or be agents for groups such as the Council on Foreign Relations, United Nations, the Royal Institute for International Affairs, Tavistock Institute, the Trilateral Commission, the Club of Rome, the Bilderberg Group, the World Health Organization, George Soros, and the Koch Brothers, in co-operation with international banks and financial institutions such as the World Bank, International Monetary Fund, and the Bank for International Settlements.

Milton William Cooper claimed that the shadow government was in cooperation with extraterrestrial aliens. His 1991 book Behold a Pale Horse, influential among "UFO and militia circles", describes "the doings of the secret world government" and "a variety of other covert activities associated with the Illuminati's declaration of war upon the people of America". Cooper claimed to have seen secret documents while in the Navy describing governmental dealings with aliens. Cooper linked the Illuminati with his beliefs that extraterrestrials were secretly involved with the US government, but later retracted these claims. He accused Dwight D. Eisenhower of negotiating a treaty with extraterrestrials in 1954, then establishing an inner circle of Illuminati to manage relations with them and keep their presence a secret from the general public. Cooper believed that aliens "manipulated and/or ruled the human race through various secret societies, religions, magic, witchcraft, and the occult", and that even the Illuminati were unknowingly being manipulated by them. Also popularizing the idea was the hit US television show, The X-Files, in the series' story arc, Mythology of The X-Files.

During the American Revolution, Committees of Safety were different local committees of Patriots that formed a shadow government to take control of the Thirteen Colonies including New York away from British royal officials. The most popular video game franchise that was created by Ubisoft was Assassin's Creed which is also part of the shadowy organization in all of human history between the Order of Assassins and the Knights Templar for generations.

== See also ==
- Deep state
- Éminence grise
- Fifth column
- New World Order (conspiracy theory)
- Power behind the throne
- Puppet regime
- Secret society
- Shadow cabinet
- Smoke-filled room
- Succession crisis
