= The Redneck Manifesto (book) =

Book by Jim Goad

The Redneck Manifesto — America's Scapegoats: How We Got That Way And Why We're Not Going To Take It Anymore
- Author: Jim Goad
- Language: English
- Publisher: Simon & Schuster
- Publication date: 1997
- Publication place: United States
- Pages: 274
- ISBN: 0-684-83113-9
- OCLC: 36446902
- Dewey Decimal: 305.5/62 21
- LC Class: HD8072.5 .G67 1997

The Redneck Manifesto — America's Scapegoats: How We Got That Way And Why We're Not Going To Take It Anymore is a 1997 book by the American author Jim Goad, in which he delineates some of his views about what he sees to be the disenfranchisement of lower-class White people, and how certain aspects of American society, such as racism and sexism, cover what he sees as a deeper concern relating to class conflict. His thesis is that the rich elite blind the poor, and cause them to fight one another, instead of working together for their mutual benefit.
