= The Goddess Bunny =

1994 film by Nick Bougas

- Cover of the VHS tape
- Directed by: Nick Bougas
- Produced by: Ray Atherton
- Starring: Goddess Bunny; John Aes-Nihil; Glen Meadmore
- Edited by: Nick Bougas
- Production company: Wavelength Video
- Release date: 1994
- Running time: 85 minutes
- Country: United States
- Language: English

The Goddess Bunny is a 1994 American documentary film directed by Nick Bougas, which is about the life of a transgender woman named Sandie Crisp, also known as the Goddess Bunny. The film was released on VHS in 1994 by Wavelength Video.

== Background and production ==
The film was directed by Nick Bougas. It was produced by Ray Atherton and edited by Bougas. The film's subject is Sandie Crisp, better known by her stage name Goddess Bunny, an American drag queen. She had been infected with polio as a child, resulting in disfigurement. It has an 85 minute runtime and was released on VHS in 1994 by Wavelength Video. It had a premiere screening on June 10, 1994.

== Synopsis ==
It is a "shockumentary" or mondo film. It includes archival footage of Crisp. The film depicts a tour of the Los Angeles, California underground transgender, lesbian, and gay nightclub scene, as hosted by Sandie Crisp, the Goddess Bunny. The film also explores the life of Crisp, mainly focusing on her transition, as well as her battle with polio as a child.

== Reception ==
The film resulted in new popularity for Crisp. Biogaphers Harry James Hanson and Devin Antheus wrote that it "catapult[ed] her from underground it girl to underground star". Literary critic Marc Shell noted its depiction of the tap dance scene as "strange", discussing it in the broader context of "the public's wanting to see a disabled person 'dance'".

== "Obey the Walrus" ==
Crisp became more widely known when an edit of a section of the film (archival footage taken in 1987 of Crisp tap dancing), played to a distorted version of "Itsy-Bitsy-Spider", was released in 2006 in the form of an online video on eBaum's World. It was then reuploaded on YouTube by the Mexican YouTube channel OBEYDAWALRUS.

The video, with the Spanish title "Obedece a la morsa", or, in English, "Obey the Walrus", subsequently went viral, reaching more than 8 million views on YouTube as of 2025. Rumors held that the video was supposedly created by a satanic cult. Crisp had a mixed response to the virality, appreciating the attention, but did not receive any commercial benefit from the popularity of the video.
