= David Dees =

American graphic artist and conspiracy theorist (1957–2020)

David Eugene Dees
- Born: July 9, 1957
- Died: May 31, 2020 (aged 62); Ashland, Oregon, U.S.
- Occupation: Commercial artist
- Known for: Art depicting conspiracy theories
- Website: DDees.com (archived August 2, 2020)

David Eugene Dees (July 9, 1957 – May 31, 2020) was an American commercial artist and graphic designer, known for his digital art depicting conspiracy theories. He began creating this type of art around 2003 after seeing photos of 9/11 that were used by conspiracy theorists.

== Career ==
Dees was an illustrator for Sesame Street Magazine. He also did freelance work for Looney Tunes, Mickey Mouse, and other Disney book covers.

Prominent themes in his artwork include chemtrails, anti-vaccine activism, climate change denial, Holocaust denial, as well as the promotion of GMO conspiracy theories, 9/11 conspiracy theories, conspiracy theories regarding the danger of wireless devices, and the Zionist Occupation Government conspiracy theory. He was particularly drawn to the belief that Zionists control the media.

David Dees was the subject of the short documentary Do You See What I See?.

== Reception ==
In 2017, the inclusion of one of Dees's illustrations in a German political textbook caused a controversy. The image, which depicted a Pac-Man-like character devouring Europe over the phrase "Rothschild bank", was widely described as antisemitic. The publisher of the textbook said that inclusion of the image was a "regrettable mistake" and halted printing. They also issued a replacement page for books that were already in circulation and promised to remove the image in the next edition.

Many images created by Dees have been widely purported as antisemitic, presenting the Holocaust as fake and using common Holocaust denial dog whistles, such as "Truth does not fear investigation". One of his images spreads the claim that the gas chambers at the Auschwitz concentration camp were used to kill lice rather than humans.
