= Krieg dem Kriege =

1924 book by Ernst Friedrich

Krieg dem Kriege! Guerre à la Guerre! War against War! Oorlog aan den Oorlog! is a book by Ernst Friedrich, published for the first time in 1924. It examines the human cost of the First World War and shows the true face of war (injuries, mutilations, executions, suffering, misery and death). The original version written in four languages (German, French, English, Dutch) has since been translated into 50+ languages.

== Description ==
The German pacifist Ernst Friedrich aimed to enlighten people with this book by demonstrating the horrors of the First World War. The work became a "pacifist bible" rallying the movement under the slogan "No more war."

Following the principle that a picture is worth a thousand words, the book makes use of images of war. One picture shows toys imitating weapons of war, below a caption reads : "Do not give these toys to your children!" It denounces the euphemistic language of war propaganda by pairing these words with violent photographs from the battlefield. A picture entitled "The field of honour" shows the naked corpse of a soldier dead from typhoid, interred in a hole in the ground. Another shows a mass of bodies collected in a ditch intended to be a mass grave, with the title "The Heroes' Tomb." The juxtapositions turn the jingoistic language into sarcastic commentary.

The book shows soldiers and their battlefield mutilations. It shows a bedridden soldier with the mouth and lower jaw completely torn off. Friedrich quotes Marshal Paul von Hindenburg: "War treats me like a spa bath!" Another quotes the words of Count von Moltke: "The most noble virtues of people are exposed in war!"

== Selected publication history ==
- Krieg dem Kriege! Berlin: Freie Jugend, 1924. First edition.
- Krieg dem Kriege! / Bd. 1 Krieg dem Kriege! = Guerre à la guerre! = War against war! = Vojnu vojně! Berlin: Freie Jugend, 1926. 8th-10th editions. Includes German, French, Dutch, English and Czech. OCLC 773442232
- Krieg dem Kriege! Frankfurt am Main : Zweitausendeins, 1981. Includes German, Dutch, and English. OCLC 313539382
- Krieg dem Kriege. Berlin: Anti-Kriegs-Museum Berlin, 2015. ISBN 9783861538288, 3861538288
