= Sean Tejaratchi =

American graphic designer, art director and writer

- Born: 1970 (age 55–56)
- Occupations: graphic designer, art director, and writer
- Known for: Crap Hound magazine; @ShittingtonUK on Twitter LiarTownUSA on Tumblr

Sean Tejaratchi (born October 1970) is an American graphic designer, art director and writer. He is currently based in Los Angeles, California. Tejaratchi is known for creating the clip art zine Crap Hound, and was voted one of "The 25 Funniest People on Twitter" by Rolling Stone in 2012. He later became known for his Tumblr blog LiarTownUSA.

== Career ==
=== Early years ===
Two years out of high school and living in Eugene, Oregon, Tejaratchi designed his first posters in 1990 for a fictional rock band and posted them around Eugene. He was inspired by the many DIY posters for punk bands he saw posted around the cities of Eugene and Portland. His design got him hired to produce posters for the W.O.W. Hall, a performing arts venue in Eugene.

It was through his work for W.O.W. Hall that he was introduced to Mike King, a screen printer and poster designer who, at the time, also produced Snipehunt, a zine devoted to the music and comic art scenes of the Northwestern United States. Tejaratchi assisted with elements of the page layout, such as paste up and typesetting, but did not contribute any content to the zine.

=== Crap Hound ===
Tejaratchi moved to Portland between the end of 1990 and the beginning of 1991. In 1994, Tejaratchi published his first edition of the graphic art zine Crap Hound. The 8½ × 11 inch zine featured pages of monochrome, high contrast line art and clip art images grouped into themes such as circuses, skeletons, hearts, hands and eyes. Tejaratchi mostly uses images taken from sources printed from the 1920s to the 1960s, such as vintage catalogs, rare books, medical textbooks, pornography and advertisements.

The inspiration for the zine came when Tejaratchi was working on a poster for a Portland-area rock band – he had a particular image of a devil in mind, but was unable to find the exact image. Tejaratchi created the zine as a way of organizing clip art of various topics to make them more easily accessible and he published these collections for the use of other graphic artists. The zine also includes satirical essays and observations on politics and culture written by Tejaratchi. The humor in his work has been described as sardonic and as having a "cheeky wit".

From 1994 to 1998 Tejaratchi published five editions of Crap Hound; he stopped printing due to a lack of funds. Tejaratchi left Portland in 2000 for St. Louis, Missouri, then New York City where he worked as art director for the New York Press, until he left for Los Angeles in 2001. Tejaratchi did not produce another edition of Crap Hound until 2005 when he was approached by Chloe Eudaly, the owner and operator of Reading Frenzy, an alternative bookstore and publishing house in Portland. Eudaly has raised money for each issue using the crowd funding website Kickstarter.

Tejaratchi's essay "Death, Phones, Scissors" – which was published in 1999 in the sixth issue of Crap Hound bearing the same title – was widely distributed via Twitter and Tumblr as part of a four paragraph essay attributed to the artist Banksy. The viral quote came from Banksy's 2004 book Cut It Out and while the book did credit Crap Hound, the attribution was left off when the text was retyped and disseminated online.

However Tejaratchi later wrote in a blog post published on Reading Frenzy's website on March 18, 2012, that he discovered Banksy had mailed a letter and a copy of Cut It Out to the address in Crap Hound in 2002. Tejaratchi stated he had been moving a lot around the same time and never received the items. He added that the attributions in the back of the book, as opposed to cited references for the excerpts, were responsible for the confusion. Tejaratchi also wrote that he did not oppose having his words published in the book and that his main concern was that his words were being wrongly attributed to Banksy via an internet JPEG. The problem was complicated by the fact that the Crap Hound issue containing the essay was about to be reprinted, raising the possibility that Tejaratchi would be accused of plagiarism.

=== Other work ===
Tejaratchi's zine work was displayed as part of The Copyist Conspiracy: An Exhibition of Zine Art, an exhibition of zine art and zine artists held in San Francisco on November 19, 2005. BoingBoing editor Cory Doctorow said that the title of his first published work, the short story Craphound, was inspired in part by Tejaratchi's zine. Doctorow also registered the domain craphound.com for his personal website.

Tejaratchi worked as a graphic designer for the performance artist and filmmaker Miranda July on her films Me and You and Everyone We Know (2005) and "The Future" (2011). He is also a writer for the American variety radio show program Live From Here. He also designs book covers for the Seattle-based book publisher Feral House.

Tejaratchi is active on Twitter under the handle @ShittingtonUK and was voted one of "The 25 Funniest People on Twitter" by Rolling Stone in 2012. He also started a Tumblr blog LiarTownUSA in 2013 that features satirical renditions of magazine covers, wall calendars, billboards and print ads for fictional products. Tejaratchi published a collection of his Tumblr material in a 2017 book titled LiarTown: The First Four Years. He has also created Social Justice Kittens calendars.

== Bibliography ==
- Crap Hound No. 1: Death, Phones & Scissors (1994)
- Crap Hound No. 2: Sex & Kitchen Gadgets Part I (1995)
- Crap Hound No. 3: Sex & Kitchen Gadgets Part II (1995)
- Crap Hound No. 4: Clowns, Devils & Bait (1996)
- Crap Hound No. 5: Hands, Hearts & Eyes (1998)
- Crap Hound No. 5: Hands, Hearts & Eyes (2013), a reprint and expansion
- Crap Hound No. 6: Death, Phones & Scissors, 2nd edition (1999), a reprint and expansion of issue No. 1
- Crap Hound No. 6: Death, Phones & Scissors, 3rd edition (2006)
- Crap Hound No. 6: Death, Phones & Scissors, 4th edition (2012)
- Crap Hound No. 7: Church & State (2008)
- Crap Hound No. 8: Superstitions (2011)
- LiarTown: The First Four Years (2017)
