= Jewish Bolshevism =

Antisemitic and anti-communist conspiracy theory

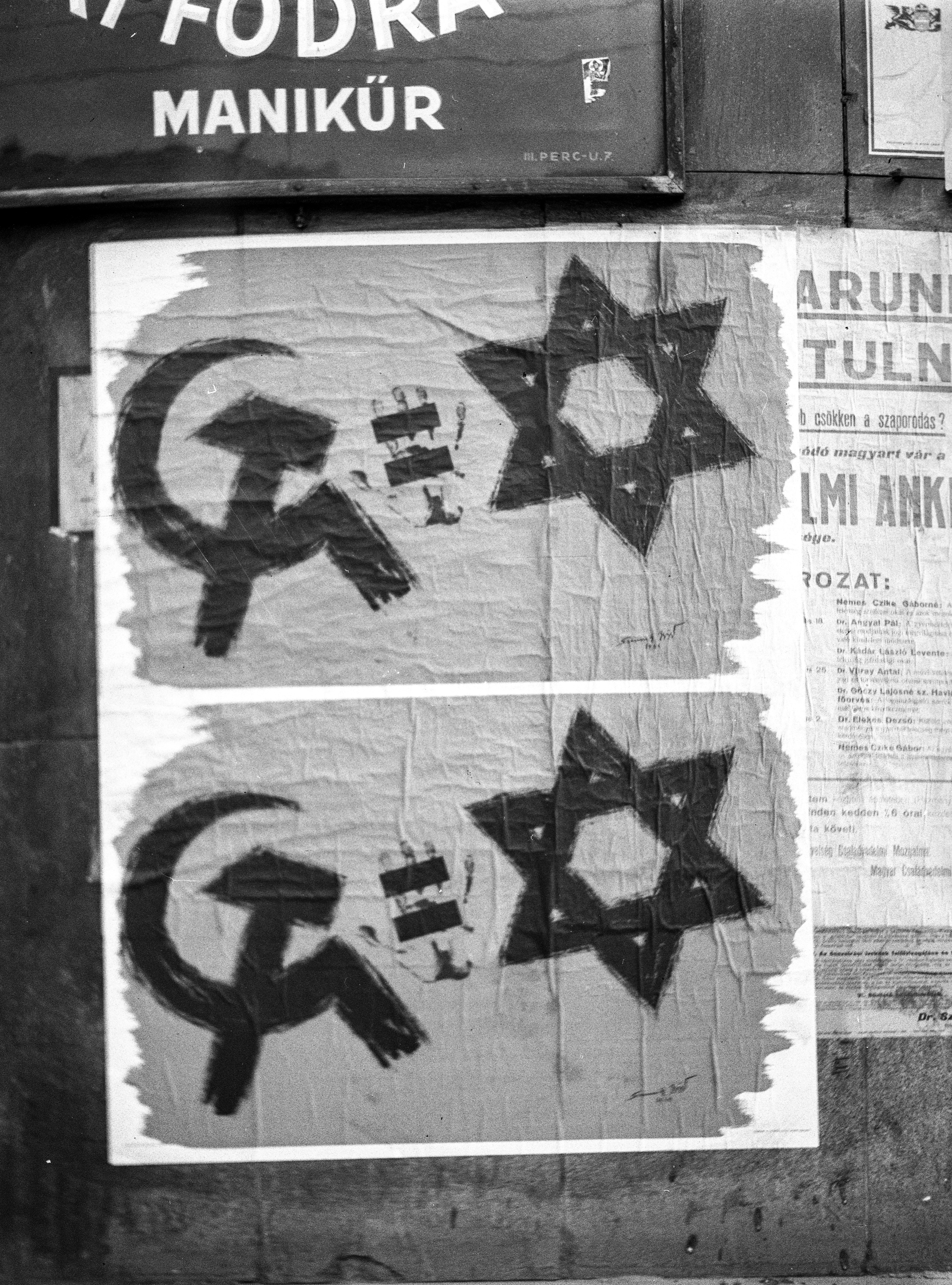
Poster in Budapest, Hungary in 1944 equating the Star of David with the hammer and sickle

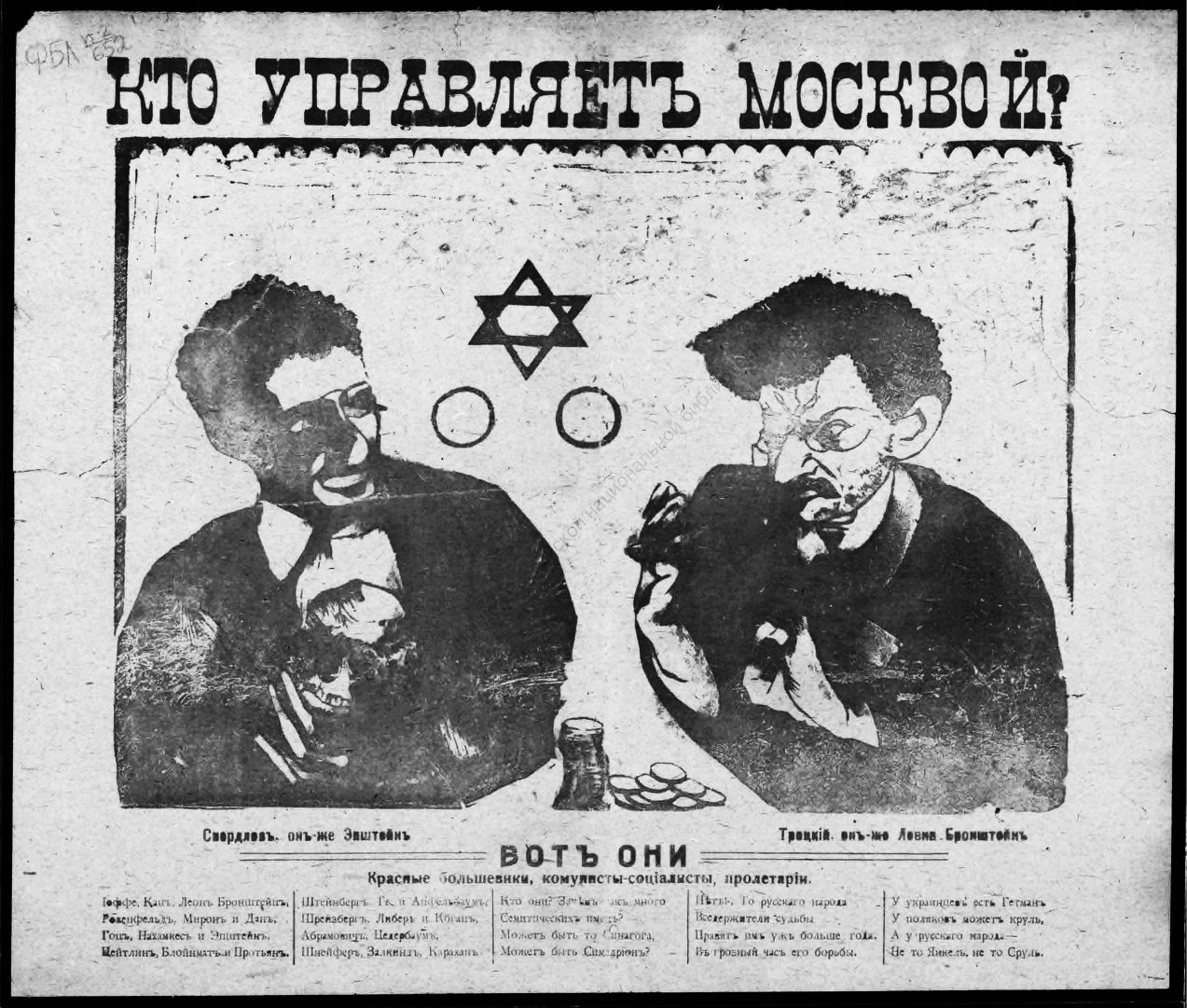
Antisemitic Russian White movement propaganda poster "Who Rules Moscow? Here they are - Red Bolsheviks, Communists-Socialists, Proletarians" (1919), caricatures of Yakov Sverdlov and Leon Trotsky, who was viewed as a symbol of Jewish Bolshevism, with the Star of David, depicting the Bolsheviks as Jews oppressing Russians and striving for money and power

Jewish Bolshevism, also Judeo–Bolshevism, is an antisemitic, anti-communist conspiracy theory and myth that claims that a Jewish conspiracy was behind the Russian Revolution of 1917, controlled the Soviet Union and international communist movements, and had a secret plan to control or destroy Western civilization; or, more generally, it is the antisemitic myth that Bolshevism was fundamentally Jewish. It was one of the main Nazi beliefs that served as an ideological justification for the German invasion of the Soviet Union and the Holocaust.

After the Russian Revolution, the catchword was the title of the pamphlet The Jewish Bolshevism, which featured in the racist propaganda of the anti-communist White movement forces during the Russian Civil War (1918–1922). During the 1930s, the Nazi Party in Germany and the German American Bund in the United States propagated the antisemitic theory to their followers, sympathisers, and fellow travellers. Nazi Germany used the trope to implement anti-Slavic policies and initiate racial war against the Soviet Union, portraying Slavs as inferior humans controlled by Jews to destroy Aryan people.

In Poland, Żydokomuna was a term for the antisemitic opinion that the Jews had a disproportionately high influence in the administration of Communist Poland. Although a sizeable minority of Polish Communists were Jewish, Polish Jews were equally supportive of Communism as Catholics at around 7% by vote, and much of the party's support came from Belarusians and Ukrainians. In far-right politics, "Jewish Bolshevism", "Jewish Communism", and the ZOG conspiracy theory are catchwords asserting that Communism is a Jewish conspiracy.

== Origins ==
The conflation of Jews and revolution emerged in the atmosphere of destruction of Russia during World War I. When the revolutions of 1917 crippled Russia's war effort, conspiracy theories developed far from Berlin and Petrograd. Some commentators in Britain ascribed the revolution to an "apparent conjunction of Bolsheviks, Germans and Jews".

In 1917, many Russian Jews were manual workers, artisans, or petite-bourgeoisie, and most were not Bolsheviks. Most Jewish socialists tended to go for the Jewish Labor Bund or Menshevik gradualism. As epitomized by Simon Dubnow, the majority of Russian Jews believed Leninism would lead to bloodshed. However, in the Soviet leadership, literate, urban Jewish people were able to obtain more representation than in the average European cabinet. By December 1917, five of the twenty-one members of the Communist Central Committee were Jewish, the commissar for foreign affairs, the president of the Supreme Soviet, the deputy chairman of the Council of People's Commissars, the president of Petrograd Soviet, and the deputy director of the Cheka secret police. During the 1920s, 15 to 20 percent of party delegates were Jewish, as were many technocrats such as clerks, researchers, teachers, and administrators. During the Russian Civil War, Jews sought protection from the Red Army as massacres were perpetrated by anti-Bolshevik forces such as Symon Petliura and those carried out by Anton Denikin, even though in some cases the Red Army itself committed atrocities against Jews. But, these were atypical as Lenin issued orders of protection, leading to young Jews volunteering for the military. While Jews were overrepresented in Bolshevism relative to their proportion of the population, so were Latvians and Caucasians. The children of Orthodox priests, generally well-educated and lacking economic opportunities, were also overrepresented in the ranks of the revolutionary organizations. Jews were the most important ethnic group after Russians politically and numerically, but Bolshevism was not "Jewish." The majority of revolutionaries were non-Jewish. Later, Bolshevism Russianized and Jews were among the first of the ethnic minorities in the Soviet Union to suffer from it as Jews, like all non-Russians, were killed disproportionately in Stalin's purges.

The worldwide spread of the Jewish Bolshevism conspiracy theory in the 1920s is associated with the publication and circulation of The Protocols of the Elders of Zion, a fraudulent document that purported to describe a secret Jewish conspiracy aimed at world domination. The expression made an issue out of the Jewishness of leading Bolsheviks, such as Leon Trotsky. Daniel Pipes said that "primarily through The Protocols of the Elders of Zion, the Whites spread these charges to an international audience." James Webb wrote that it is rare to find an antisemitic source after 1917 that "does not stand in debt to the White Russian analysis of the Revolution".

== Jewish involvement in Russian Communism ==
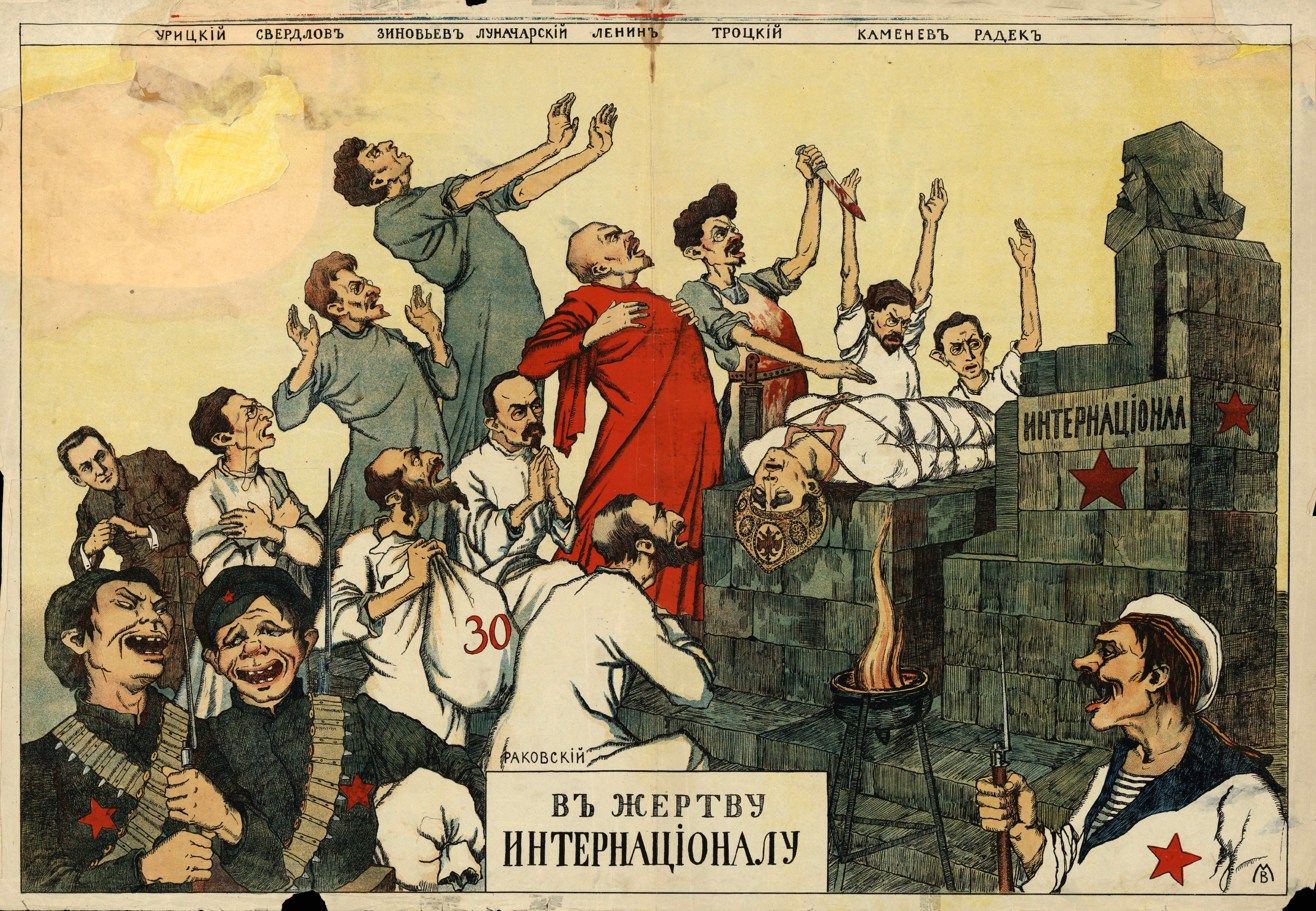
"Sacrifice to the International", an antisemitic White Movement cartoon showing prominent Bolsheviks (L–R: Uritsky, Sverdlov, Zinoviev, Lunacharsky, Lenin, Trotsky, Kamenev, Radek), primarily those with Jewish backgrounds, sacrificing Russia — personified as a woman — to a statue of Karl Marx

Antisemitism in the Russian Empire existed both culturally and institutionally. The Jews were restricted to live within the Pale of Settlement, and they also suffered pogroms.

As a result, many Jews supported gradual or revolutionary changes to the Russian Empire. Those movements ranged among the far left (Jewish Anarchism, Bundists, Bolsheviks, Mensheviks,) and moderate left (Trudoviks) and constitutionalist (Constitutional Democrats) parties. According to the 1922 Bolshevik party census, there were 19,564 Jewish Bolsheviks, comprising 5.21% of the total, and in the 1920s of the 417 members of the Central Executive Committee, the party Central Committee, the Presidium of the Executive of the Soviets of the USSR and the Russian Republic, the People's Commissars, 6% were ethnic Jews. Between 1936 and 1940, during the Great Purge, Yezhovshchina and after the rapprochement with Nazi Germany, Stalin had largely eliminated Jews from senior party, government, diplomatic, security and military positions.

Some scholars have grossly exaggerated Jewish presence in the Soviet Communist Party. According to Alfred Jensen, in the 1920s "75 per cent of the leading Bolsheviks" were "of Jewish origin". According to David Aaronovitch, "a cursory examination of membership of the top committees shows this figure to be an absurd exaggeration".

In 2013, speaking about the Schneerson Collection at the Moscow Jewish Museum and the Center for Tolerance, Russian President Vladimir Putin erroneously said:

"The decision to nationalize the library was made by the first Soviet government, and Jews were approximately 80–85% members".

According to historian Vladimir Ryzhkov, Putin's ignorant statement about the predominance of Jews in the Council of People's Commissars is due to the fact that "during the years of perestroika, he read the low-quality nationalist tabloid press". Some media outlets also criticized the statements of the President of the Russian Federation. So the editors of the newspaper Vedomosti, condemning the head of state for marginality, posted the following statistics:

"If we discard the speculations of pseudoscientists who know how to find the Jewish origin of every revolutionary, it turns out that in the first composition of the Council of People's Commissars of Jews there were 8%: of its 16 members, only Leon Trotsky was a Jew. In the government of the Russian Socialist Federative Soviet Republic of 1917–1922 Jews were 12% (six out of 50 people). Apart from the government, the Central Committee of the Russian Social Democratic Labour Party (Bolsheviks) on the eve of October 1917 had 20% Jews (6 out of 30), and in the first composition of the political bureau of the Central Committee of the Russian Communist Party (Bolsheviks) – 40% (3 out of 7)".— Vedomosti (dated 17 June 2013).

== Nazi Germany ==
"Great War itself then brought about [the last] a further bleeding of Russia's Nordic-German elements, and the last remnants were finally eradicated by the revolution and Bolshevism.. With the help of the Slavic racial instinct, the Jews—pushing toward the upper class and therefore upper leadership—exterminated the previous foreign upper class... with the Bolshevik Revolution, Jews took over leadership in all areas of Russian life, then this is a self evident process, because in and of itself the Slavic people completely lack any organizational capability and thus also any state-forming and state-maintaining power. If one were to pull out of the Slavic people all of the elements that are not purely Slavic, then the state would also immediately break up."

— Adolf Hitler outlining his view of the Bolshevik revolution, in Hitlers Zweites Buch

=== Background ===
Walter Laqueur traces the Jewish-Bolshevik conspiracy theory to Nazi ideologue Alfred Rosenberg, for whom Bolshevism was "the revolt of the Jewish, Slavic and Mongolian races against the German (Aryan) element in Russia". Germans, according to Rosenberg, had been responsible for Russia's historic achievements and had been sidelined by the Bolsheviks, who did not represent the interests of the Russian people, but instead those of its ethnic Jewish and Chinese population.

Michael Kellogg in his Ph.D. thesis argued that the racist ideology of Nazis was to a significant extent influenced by White émigrés in Germany, many of whom, while former subjects of the Russian Empire, were of non-Russian descent: ethnic Germans, residents of Baltic lands including Baltic Germans, and Ukrainians. Of particular note was their Aufbau organization (Aufbau: Wirtschafts-politische Vereinigung für den Osten (Reconstruction: Economic-Political Organization for the East), whose leader was instrumental in making The Protocols of The Elders of Zion available in German. He argues that the early Hitler was rather philosemitic, and became rabidly antisemitic after 1919 under the influence of White émigré convictions about a conspiracy of Jews, an unseen unity from financial capitalists to Bolsheviks, to conquer the world. Therefore, he concluded, White émigrés were at the source of the Nazi concept of Jewish Bolshevism. Annemarie Sammartino argues that this view is contestable. While there is no doubt that White emigres were instrumental in reinforcing the idea of 'Jewish Bolshevism' among Nazis, the concept is also found in many early post–World War I German documents. Also, Germany had its own share of Jewish Communists "to provide fodder for the paranoid fantasies of German antisemites" without Russian Bolsheviks.

Adolf Hitler primarily viewed the October Revolution as an usurpation of power from Nordic-Germanic elites by Jews. Hitler classified Slavs as among the inferior races and believed that they lacked an independent ability for statecraft. Hitler wrote in Mein Kampf that the Russian Empire had been dominated by an Aryan Germanic aristocracy who ruled over Russian masses, whom he viewed as primitive. During the 1920s, Hitler declared that the mission of the Nazi movement was to destroy "Jewish Bolshevism". Hitler asserted that the "three vices" of "Jewish Marxism" were democracy, pacifism and internationalism, and that Jews were behind Bolshevism, communism and Marxism. Nazi propaganda also used the trope to advance anti-Slavic racism, depicting Slavs as primitive hordes controlled by Jews to attack Aryans. Hitler ordered Operation Barbarossa with firm convictions of an inevitable German victory, due to his beliefs that Judeo-Bolshevism had liquidated Russia's Aryan aristocracy, which in his view, made the country into a failed state.

In Nazi Germany, this concept of Jewish Bolshevism reflected a common perception that Communism was a Jewish-inspired and Jewish-led movement seeking world domination from its origin. The term was popularized in print in German journalist Dietrich Eckhart's 1924 pamphlet "Der Bolschewismus von Moses bis Lenin" ("Bolshevism from Moses to Lenin") which depicted both Moses and Lenin as Communist and Jewish. This was followed by Alfred Rosenberg's 1923 edition of The Protocols of the Elders of Zion and Hitler's Mein Kampf in 1925, which saw Bolshevism as "Jewry's twentieth century effort to take world dominion unto itself".

According to French spymaster and writer Henri Rollin, "Hitlerism" was based on "anti-Soviet counter-revolution" promoting the "myth of a mysterious Jewish–Masonic–Bolshevik plot", entailing that the First World War had been instigated by a vast Jewish–Masonic conspiracy to topple the Russian, German, and Austro-Hungarian Empires and implement Bolshevism by fomenting liberal ideas. A major source for propaganda about Jewish Bolshevism in the 1930s and early 1940s was the pro-Nazi and antisemitic international Welt-Dienst news agency founded in 1933 by Ulrich Fleischhauer. Within the German Army, a tendency to see Soviet Communism as a Jewish conspiracy had grown since the First World War, something that became officialized under the Nazis. A 1932 pamphlet by Ewald Banse of the Government-financed German National Association for the Military Sciences described the Soviet leadership as mostly Jewish, dominating an apathetic and mindless Russian population.

=== Under the Third Reich ===
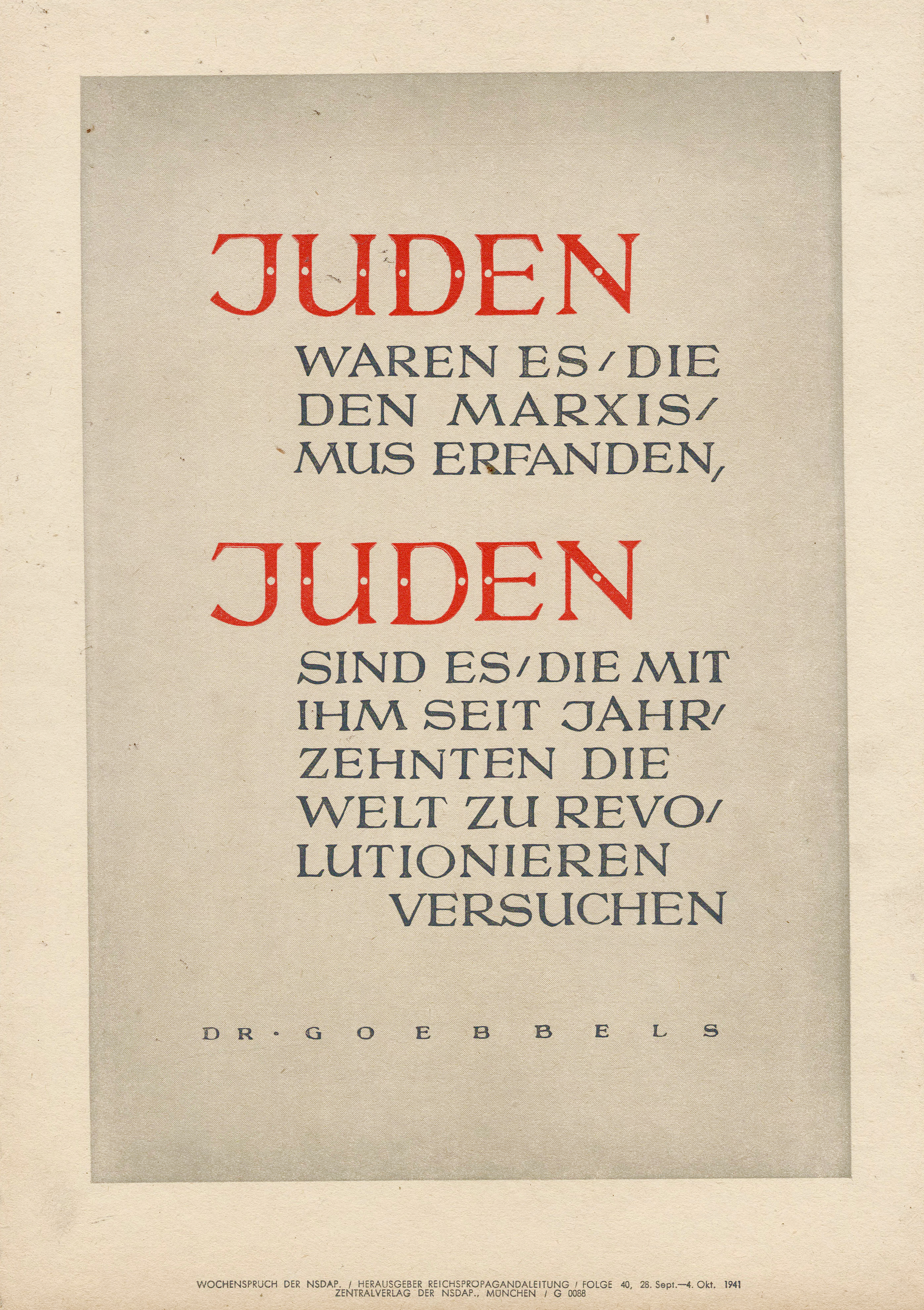
Wochenspruch der NSDAP of 28 September 1941, accuses Jews of creating Marxism

By the mid thirties, the Reich Ministry of Public Enlightenment and Propaganda had created a special agency called the Anti-Komintern, dedicated to creating anti-communist propaganda and heavily publicizing their theory of Judeo-Bolshevism.

Propaganda produced in 1935 by the psychological war laboratory of the German War Ministry described Soviet officials as "mostly filthy Jews" and called on Red Army soldiers to rise up and kill their "Jewish commissars". This material was not used at the time, but served as a basis for propaganda in the 1940s.

Nazi Propaganda Minister Joseph Goebbels speaking at the Nuremberg Party Rally in September 1935 said:

While National Socialism brought about a new version and formulation of European culture, Bolshevism is the declaration of war by Jewish-led international subhumans against culture itself. It is not only anti-bourgeois, but it is also anti-cultural. It means, in the final consequence, the absolute destruction of all economic, social, state, cultural, and civilizing advances made by western civilization for the benefit of a rootless and nomadic international clique of conspirators, who have found their representation in Jewry.

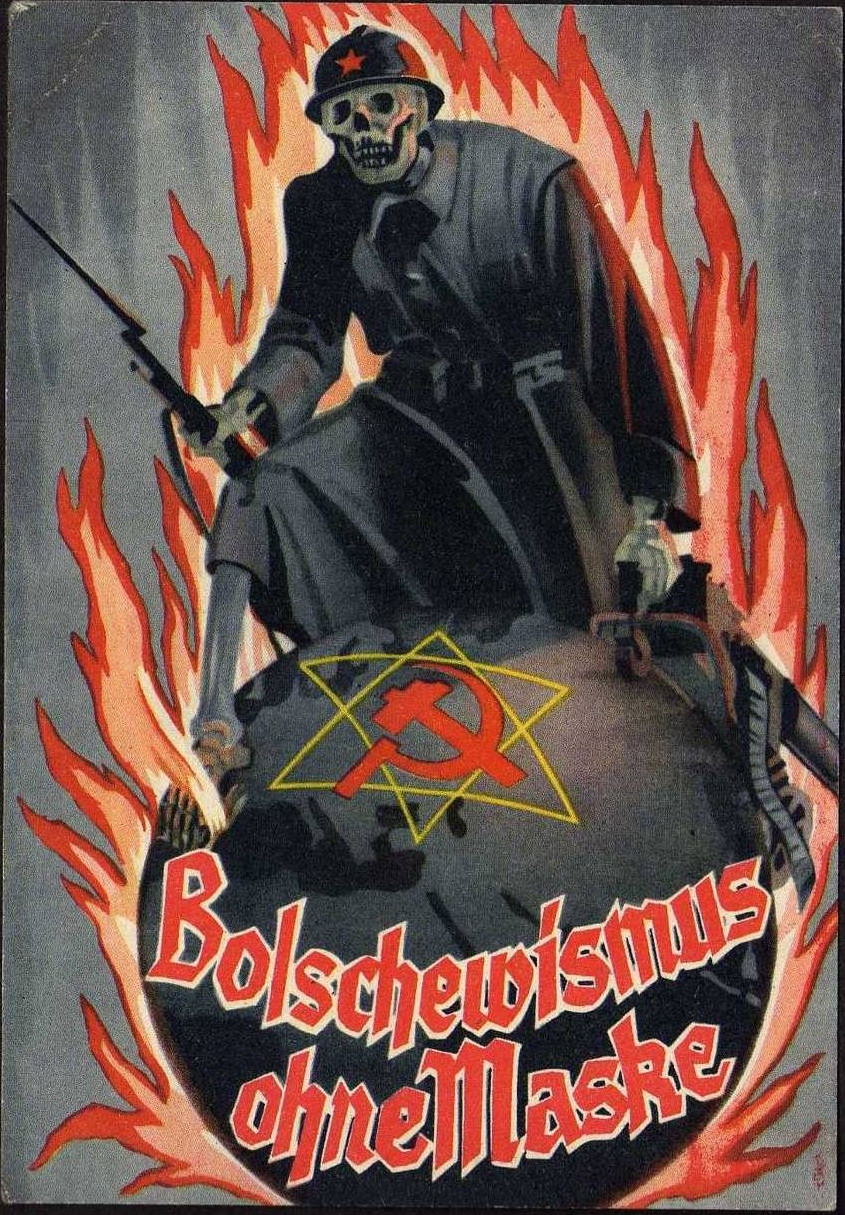
Nazi German propaganda poster "Bolshevism without the Mask", 1937. The "Jewish Bolshevism" conspiracy theory was a major part of Nazi propaganda, and the Holocaust was justified as a part of the anti-Communist struggle.

Members of the Nazi Schutzstaffel (SS) were encouraged to fight against "Jewish Bolshevik sub-humans". In the pamphlet The SS as an Anti-Bolshevist Fighting Organization, published in 1936, Reichsführer-SS Heinrich Himmler wrote:

We shall take care that never again in Germany, the heart of Europe, will the Jewish-Bolshevik revolution of subhumans be able to be kindled either from within or through emissaries from without.

=== During WW2 ===
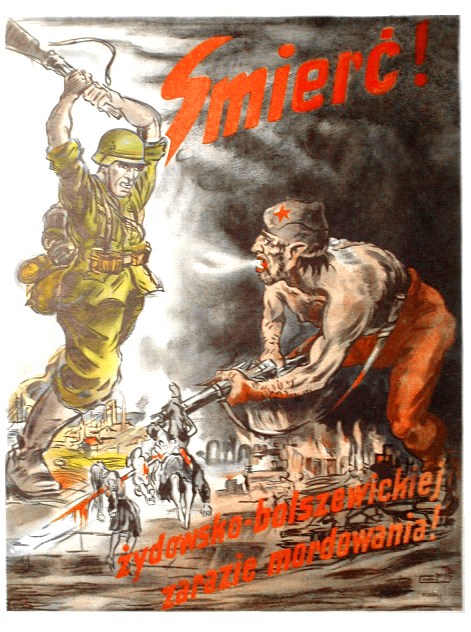
German antisemitic and anti-Soviet propaganda poster, written in the Polish language. The text reads "Death! to Jewish-Bolshevik pestilence of murdering!"

After Operation Barbarossa Nazi propaganda depicted the war as a "European crusade against Bolshevism" and Waffen-SS units consisted largely or solely of foreign volunteers and conscripts. In private conversations held in the 1940s, Hitler also labelled Christianity a Jewish product analogous to Judeo-Bolshevism:

"The heaviest blow that ever struck humanity was the coming of Christianity. Bolshevism is Christianity's illegitimate child. Both are inventions of the Jew. The deliberate lie in the matter of religion was introduced into the world by Christianity. Bolshevism practises a lie of the same nature, when it claims to bring liberty to men, whereas in reality it seeks only to enslave them. In the ancient world, the relations between men and gods were founded on an instinctive respect. It was a world enlightened by the idea of tolerance. Christianity was the first creed in the world to exterminate its adversaries in the name of love. Its key-note is intolerance."

— Adolf Hitler, in Hitler's Table Talk, p. 7,

In his speech to the Reichstag justifying Operation Barbarossa in 1941, Hitler said:

For more than two decades the Jewish Bolshevik regime in Moscow had tried to set fire not merely to Germany but to all of Europe ... The Jewish-Bolshevik rulers in Moscow have unswervingly undertaken to force their domination upon us and the other European nations and that not merely spiritually, but also in terms of military power ... the hour has come, in which it is necessary to confront this plot of the Jewish Anglo-Saxon warmongers, and the equally Jewish rulers of the Bolshevik center in Moscow."

Field-Marshal Wilhelm Keitel gave an order on 12 September 1941 which declared: "the struggle against Bolshevism demands ruthless and energetic, rigorous action above all against the Jews, the main carriers of Bolshevism".

Historian Richard J. Evans wrote that Wehrmacht officers regarded the Russians as "sub-human", and were from the time of the invasion of Poland in 1939 telling their troops the war was caused by "Jewish vermin", explaining to the troops that the war against the Soviet Union was a war to wipe out what were variously described as "Jewish Bolshevik subhumans", the "Mongol hordes", the "Asiatic flood" and the "red beast", language clearly intended to produce war crimes by reducing the enemy to something less than human.

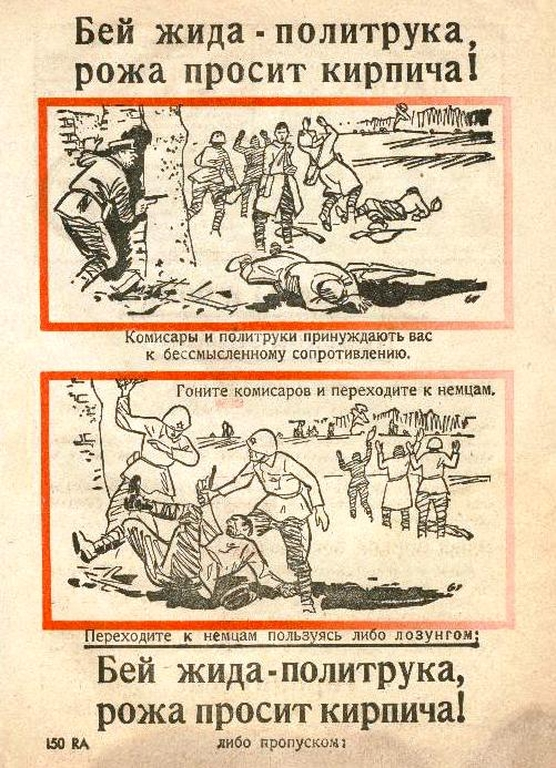
"Kill the Jew - political commissar, the mug asks for a brick!" Nazi propaganda poster for Soviet soldiers

Joseph Goebbels published an article in 1942 called "the so-called Russian soul" in which he claimed that Bolshevism was exploiting the Slavs and that the battle of the Soviet Union determined whether Europe would become under complete control by international Jewry.

Nazi propaganda presented Barbarossa as an ideological-racial war between German Nazism and "Judeo-Bolshevism", dehumanising the Soviet enemy as a force of Slavic Untermensch (sub-humans) and "Asiatic" savages engaging in "barbaric Asiatic fighting methods" commanded by evil Jewish commissars whom German troops were to grant no mercy. The vast majority of the Wehrmacht officers and soldiers tended to regard the war in Nazi terms, seeing their Soviet opponents as sub-human.

== Outside Nazi Germany ==
=== Great Britain ===
In the early 1920s, leading British antisemite Henry Hamilton Beamish stated that Bolshevism was the same thing as Judaism. In the same decade, future wartime Prime Minister Winston Churchill penned an editorial entitled "Zionism versus Bolshevism", published in the Illustrated Sunday Herald. In the article, which asserted that Zionism and Bolshevism were engaged in a "struggle for the soul of the Jewish people", he called on Jews to repudiate "the Bolshevik conspiracy" and make clear that "the Bolshevik movement is not a Jewish movement" but stated that:

[Bolshevism] among the Jews is nothing new. From the days of Spartacus-Weishaupt to those of Karl Marx, and down to Trotsky (Russia), Bela Kun (Hungary), Rosa Luxemburg (Germany), and Emma Goldman (United States), this world-wide conspiracy for the overthrow of civilisation and for the reconstitution of society on the basis of arrested development, of envious malevolence, and impossible equality, has been steadily growing.

Author Gisela C. Lebzelter noted that Churchill's analysis failed to analyze the role that Russian oppression of Jews had played in their joining various revolutionary movements, but instead "to inherent inclinations rooted in Jewish character and religion".

The London Catholic Herald wrote how the Soviet anti-religious campaign was an expression of Jewish hatred for Christianity. Herald concludes that "If every wholesale power were to pass into Jewish hands, similar to Russia, the Russian horrors would be repeated.”

In 1919 the London Morning Post Russia correspondent wrote in the article "The Red Terror in Kiev" about Bolshevism's supposedly alien character, claiming that the Soviet state was run by non-Russian ethnic groups, Jews being a very prominent part of this, although not exclusively so:

In the first place, as Kiev knew the Bolsheviki, they are utter aliens — Letts, Finns, internationalized Jews, Rumanians, anything except actual Russians. Rokowsky, the nominal head of the Bolshevist Government in Kiev, was a Jew, born a Bulgarian, naturalized as a Rumanian; Latsis, head of the Extraordinary Commission for the Suppression of Counter-Revolution in Kiev, and in reality the master of the city, was a Lett — a Lettish Jew — and there were a few Jews in the movement who had been in America long enough to obtain citizenship.

=== Finland ===
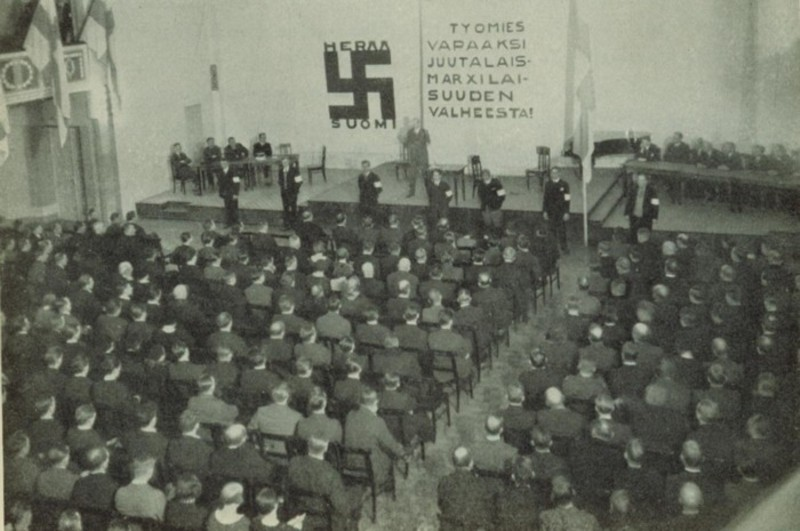
Captain Arvi Kalsta addressing an SKJ meeting; "Liberate the working man from the lie of Judeo-Marxism!", 1933

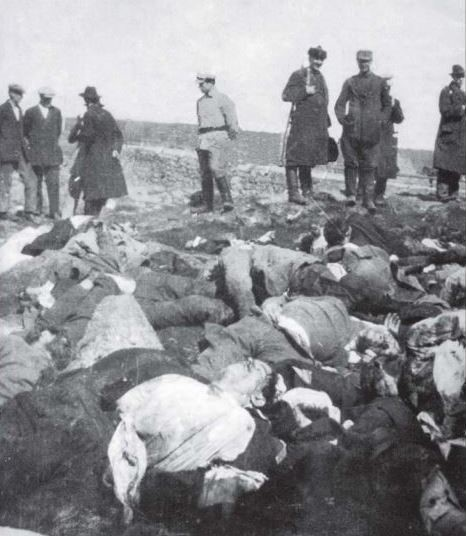
Hundreds of people belonging to ethnic minorities were executed in Vyborg for their supposed Bolshevik leanings.

White Guard associated newspapers spread the myth of Judeo-Bolshevism and a rumor spread among the White Guard that the Jews of Vyborg had aided the Red Guard, and a group of Jägers planned to round up and execute all the Jews living in the city. The plan was never executed in its planned extent, though a number of Jews were executed in the Vyborg massacre.

In 1919, the White Guard-associated propaganda organ Church-National Enlightenment Bureau published "What is Bolshevism", targeted at former Red Guards. The book argued that communism was a Jewish plot and communist leaders were almost exclusively Jewish and Jews were a race "that has a peculiar ability to live without working at the expense of others by swindling".

The founder and the main ideologue of Agrarian League Santeri Alkio subscribed to the Judeo-Bolshevik conspiracy and wrote that the supposed Jewish leaders of the Bolsheviks were "driven by a will to take revenge on Russia, Finland, and all of Europe for the centuries of the suffering of Jews".

Martti Pihkala, White Guard founder and ideologue, Conservative MP and the leader of the strikebreaking organization Vientirauha said in 1919 that 'Bolsheviks, those who are planning a global Bolshevik state, an oligarchy, a dictatorship of thugs who call themselves poor and are, in most cases, Jews'.

In 1920, the chief of the newly established Finnish Security Police advised his personnel on how to proceed with Jews coming from Russia: "One must be very much on one's guard, particularly with the Jews, for according to the received information, at least 80 percent of all Bolshevik leaders are thought to be Jews".

The Finnish charge d'affaires to the USSR and future Prime Minister Antti Hackzell wrote in the 1920s that Jews controlled the state spying and terror apparatus.

Akseli Gallen-Kallela wrote to General and future President Mannerheim in 1920 that the Jews were behind the recent wars and that "[Jews] now swing the Marshal's batons behind the Supreme Soviet", to which Mannerheim replied "we are all becoming tools in the hands of the Jews".

Elmo Kaila, the chairman of the Academic Karelia Society, one of the most prominent nationalist organizations in Finland, stated several times his belief that the Soviet Union was led by the Jews and that "the God-forsaken nation" invented communism:

That is why the Russian has never been able to build a state and to uphold it, it has instead been done by outwardly russified Vikings, Tatars, Germans and the English and others. After the German born royal house has fallen Jews have now taken control and are ruling in the name of Russia, like the Tsars once did.

In the 1930s and 1940s, several far-right newspapers such as Ajan Suunta, Kansallissosialisti and Herää Suomi spread the myth of Judeo-Bolshevism. The Patriotic Citizens of Viitasaari also spread leaflets in prints of tens of thousands, tirelessly trying to prove the Jews sought world domination through communism.

The leader of the Lapua Movement and the Patriotic People's Movement Vihtori Kosola stated that Communism is "insidious and corrupting [because] it was born in the mind of the Jew that is alien to Christianity and all patriotic feeling" and "it aims to destroy patriotic feeling and our democratic republic, religious foundation and love for fatherland and...enslave the country with Jewish shackles."

After the war, Untersturmführer Unto Parvilahti's memoirs made the case the USSR was led by Jews, and Parvilahti's book became a great success, going through 11 editions and being translated into multiple languages. Parvilahti also became a sought after speaker in veterans events and conservative parties speaking tours.

=== United States ===
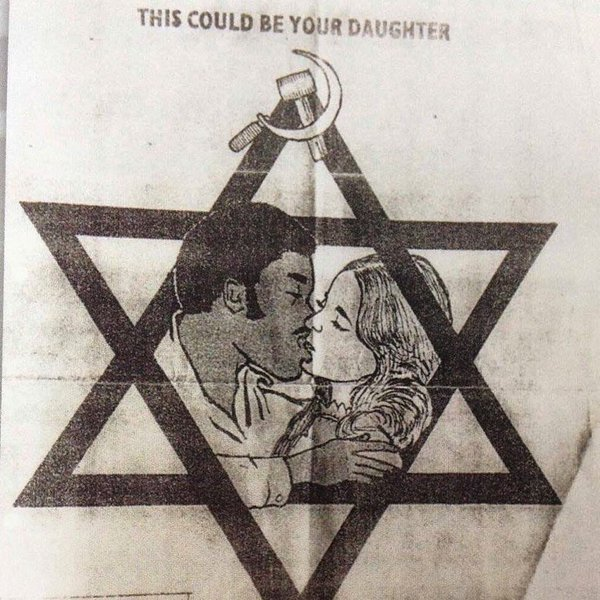
A 1960s poster opposing racial mixing that associates miscegenation with communism and Jews.

The myth also influenced figures such as Henry Ford who invoked it in his 1920 articles in which he referred to Jewish control of the world's finances and the Jewish origins of Bolshevism.

In the 1930s, Father Charles Coughlin a Roman Catholic priest and radio celebrity based outside of Detroit, had as many as 40 million weekly listeners on his weekly radio show. During his radio broadcast on November 20, 1938, while reports of the Kristallnacht pogrom in Germany were still on the front pages of many American newspapers, Coughlin defended the Nazi attacks as justified. Claiming to merely be a “student of history,” he traced “the causes of the effect known as Naziism” [sic] for his listeners, concluding that Nazism had “evolved to act as a defense mechanism against the incursions of Communism.” Coughlin listed supposed communist leaders, claiming that the vast majority were “atheistic Jews.” Therefore, he argued, “Naziism, the effect of Communism, cannot be liquidated in its persecution complex until the religious Jews in high places–in synagogue, in finance, in radio and in the press–attack the cause, attack forthright the errors and spread of Communism, together with their co-nationalists who support it.”

In a 1943 speech on the floor of Congress Mississippi Representative John E. Rankin espoused a conspiracy of "alien-minded" Communist Jews arranging for white women to be raped by African American men:

When those communistic Jews—of whom the decent Jews are ashamed—go around here and hug and kiss these Negroes, dance with them, intermarry with them, and try to force their way into white restaurants, white hotels and white picture shows, they are not deceiving any red-blooded American, and, above all, they are not deceiving the men in our armed forces—as to who is at the bottom of all this race trouble.

The better element of the Jews, and especially the old line American Jews throughout the South and West, are not only ashamed of, but they are alarmed at, the activities of these communistic Jews who are stirring this trouble up.

They have caused the deaths of many good Negroes who never would have got into trouble if they had been left alone, as well as the deaths of many good white people, including many innocent, unprotected white girls, who have been raped and murdered by vicious Negroes, who have been encouraged by those alien-minded Communists to commit such crimes.

In 1971 President Richard Nixon stated that "The only two non-Jews in the Communist conspiracy were [Whittaker] Chambers and [Alger] Hiss...Every other one was a Jew. And it raised hell with us."

=== El Salvador ===
Speaking to West German journalists, Roberto D'Aubuisson told them that "You Germans were very intelligent. You realized that the Jews were responsible for the spread of Communism and you began to kill them."

=== Poland ===
Under the Second Polish Republic, a pejorative stereotype accused Jews of helping the Soviet Union to bring Communism in Poland.

In the 1930s and 1940s, there existed some admiration for fascist movements in Poland. Prominent Polish nationalist Reverend Stanisław Trzeciak wrote in the Christian nationalist magazine Mały Dziennik that "Hitler's program is based on papal encyclicals... [Hitler plays] a providential role in curbing Jewish malice and saving humanity from Judeo-Bolshevism." Polish nationalist groups like the League of Polish Families have dismissed pogroms committed by Poles such as Jedwabne massacre, while simultaneously arguing Jews were collectively guilty of treason in supporting the Soviet Union.

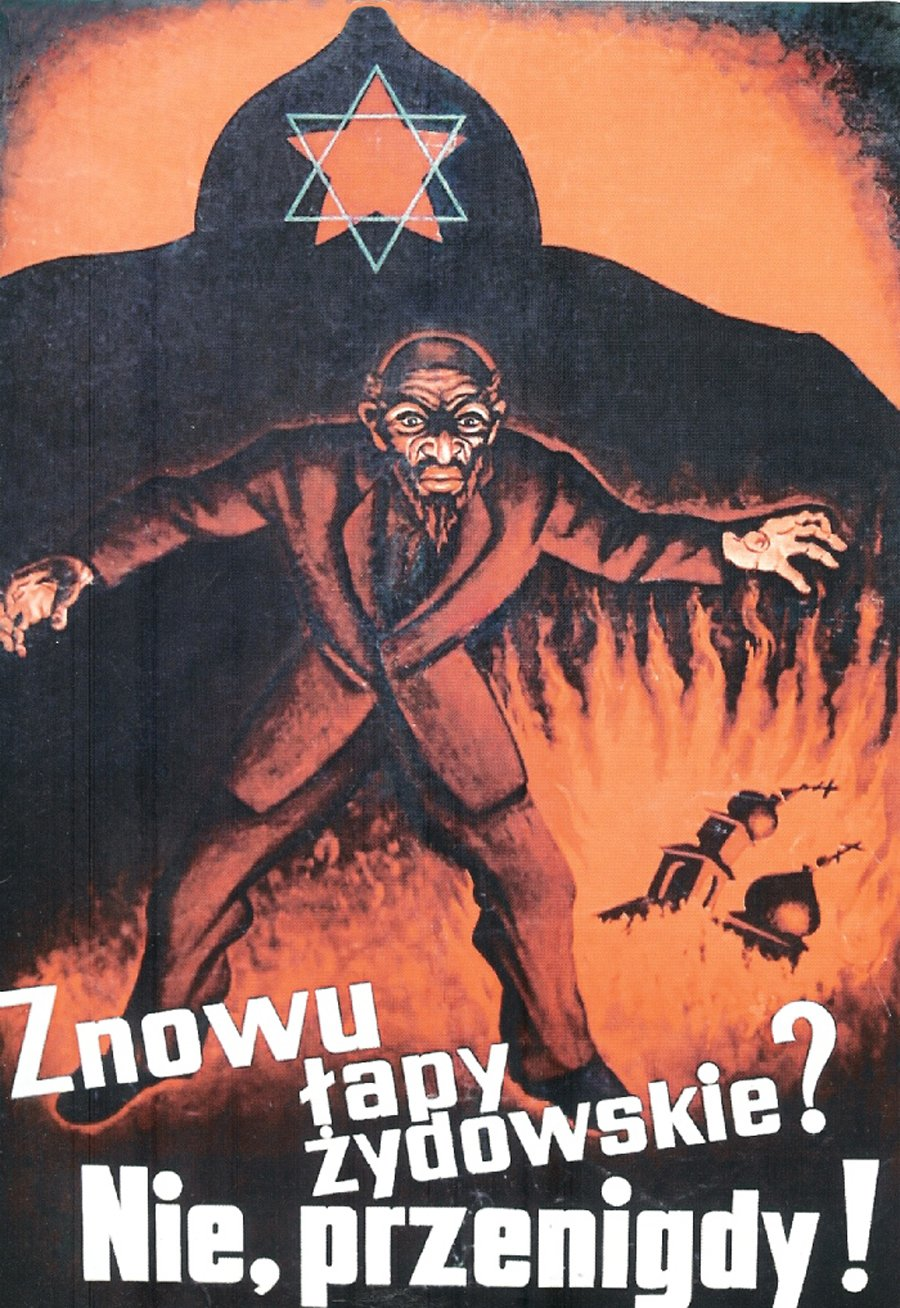
Antisemitic Polish poster from the Polish–Soviet War (1919–1920): "Jewish paws again? No, never!"

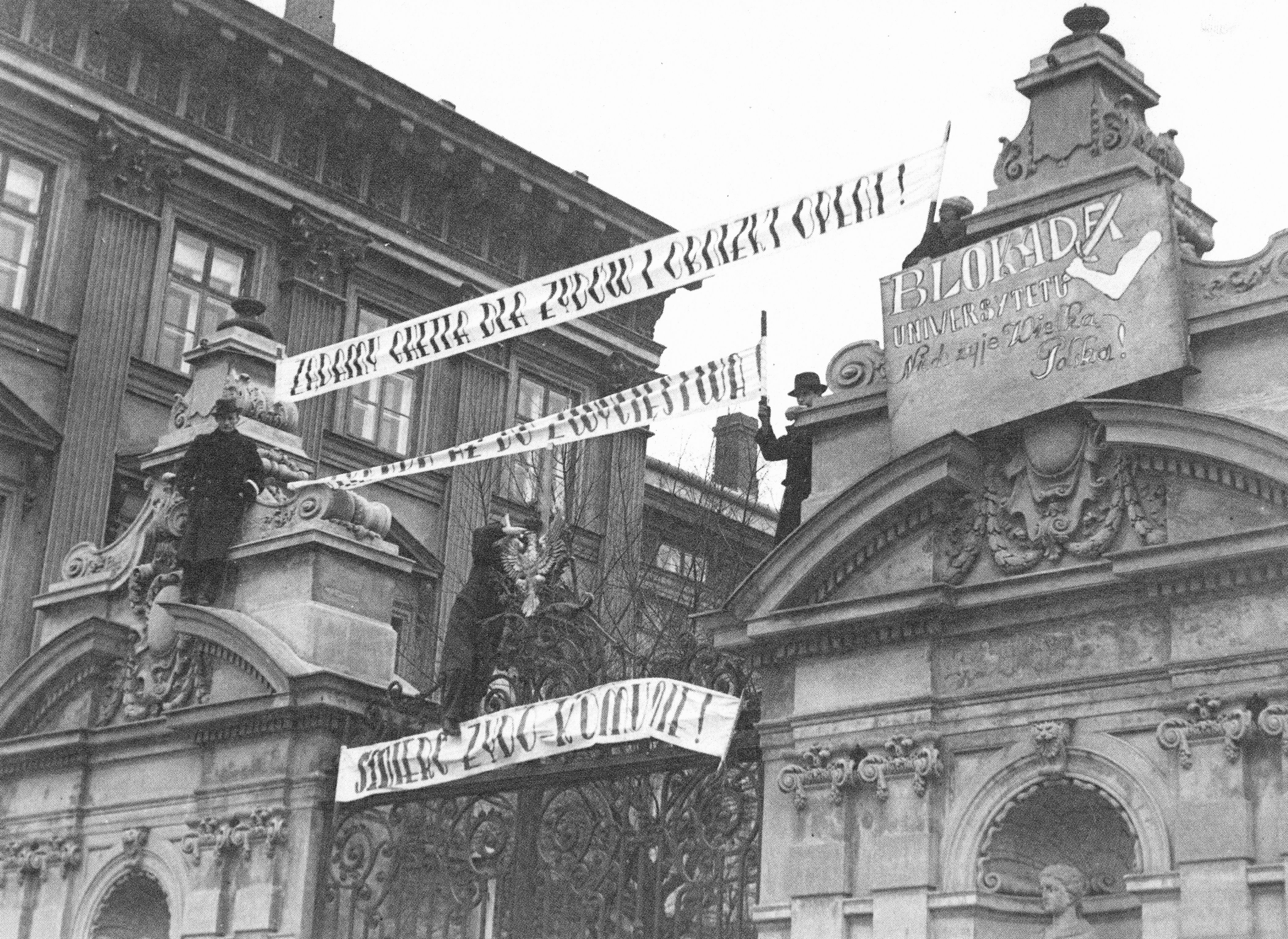
ONR banners over Warsaw University entrance during an attempt to prevent Jews from registering as students, 1936. The lower reads "Śmierć żydo-komunie" ("Death to Judeo-Communism").

=== France ===
In the 1920s, several French authors who travelled to Moscow such as Henri Béraud and Louise Weiss, described the Soviet regime as being under Jewish influence.

In a book published in 1921, Quand Israël est roi ("When Israel is King"), Jérôme Tharaud and his brother Jean Tharaud described the Hungarian Soviet Republic as under Jewish domination.

In the 1920s, royalist writer Charles Maurras, having compared to "vermin" the numerous Jewish migrants from the Middle East who lived in Paris, accused them of bringing "lice, plague, typhus, while waiting for the revolution".

Several propaganda works published under Vichy France explicitly linked Jews to communism: for example, the exposition Le Juif et la France had a section about Communism. Likewise, the exposition Le Bolchevisme contre l'Europe blamed Jews for Communism.

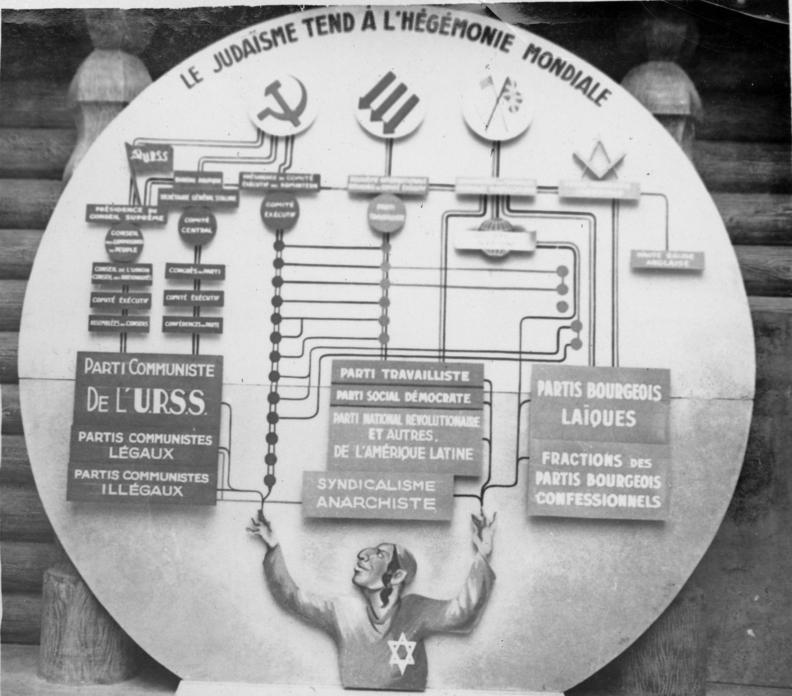
Antisemitic propaganda poster from 1942 showing "the tendency of Judaism toward world hegemony"

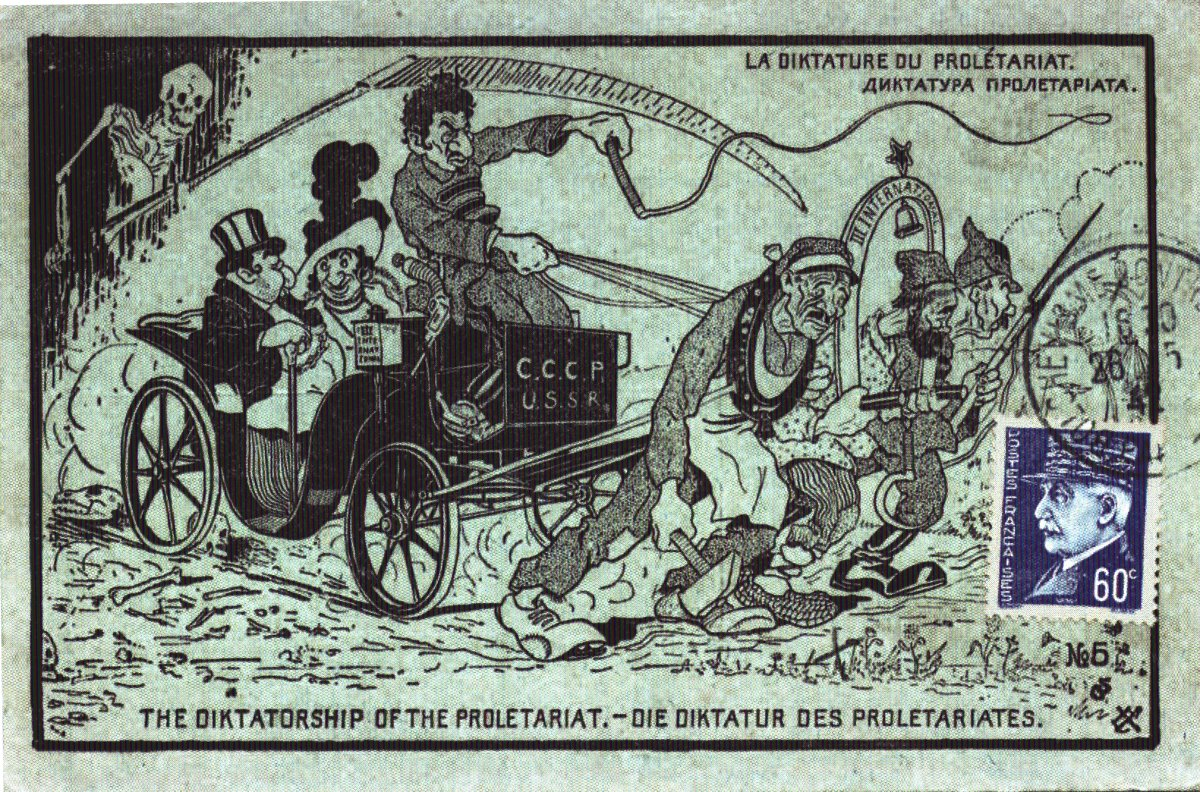
Postcard designed in the thirties by an organization of White Russians and published in Paris in February 1942 and sold during the Anti-Bolshevik Exhibition

== Works propagating the canard ==
Cover of the Red Russian Meat Grinder

=== The Octopus ===
The Octopus is a 256-page book self-published in 1940 by Elizabeth Dilling under the pseudonym "Rev. Frank Woodruff Johnson". In it, she describes her theories of Jewish Bolshevism.

=== Behind Communism ===
Frank L. Britton, editor of The American Nationalist published Behind Communism in 1952. It disseminated the myth that Communism was a Jewish conspiracy originating in Palestine.

=== Europa: The Last Battle ===
Europa: The Last Battle is a 2017 neo-Nazi propaganda film which promotes antisemitic conspiracy theories, including claims that communism was a Jewish ideology.

=== Red Russian Meat Grinder ===
Boris Popper wrote the book "Red Russian Meat Grinder" (fin. Venäjän Punainen Lihamylly) about his prison experiences in the USSR under the pseudonym Boris Berin-Bey. The book was published by the Veronica Society, founded by neo-Nazi Pekka Siitoin. The book makes the claim the USSR was led by the Jews, and on the book's cover is an illustration of the star of David made of barbed wire.

=== The World Hoax ===
The World Hoax was a 1938 book by Ernest F. Elmhurst on Communism and how the Jewish people supposedly were engineering for the United States government to be overthrown and a Bolshevik state be installed in its place.

Communism, as you will now be shown, was hatched by a Jew-and a particularly disgusting one at that-kept alive by Jews, financed by them at the close of the world war, is staffed by them, installed by them in every country wherein it has taken its blood-toll, and at the present moment is being promoted to a lecherous "victory" in our Christian land by certain especially rapacious Sons of Judah, whilst thousands of other Jews brag openly of its "success" and readily concede its Jewish character and purpose from hide to marrow.

Friend and publisher of Elmhurst, William Dudley Pelley would later further promote claims made by Elmhurst, such as that the Bolshevik revolution was perpetrated by "two hundred and seventy-six Jews from New York's East Side."

== Analysis ==
Researchers in the field such as Polish philosopher Stanisław Krajewski or André Gerrits, denounce the concept of Jewish Bolshevism as prejudice. Law professor Ilya Somin agrees, and compares Jewish involvement in other communist countries:

"Overrepresentation of a group in a political movement does not prove either that the movement was 'dominated' by that group or that it primarily serves that group's interests. The idea that communist oppression was somehow Jewish in nature is belied by the record of communist regimes in countries like China, North Korea, and Cambodia, where the Jewish presence was and is minuscule."

Several scholars have observed that Jewish involvement in Communist movements was primarily a response to antisemitism and rejection by established politics. Others note that this involvement was greatly exaggerated to accord with existing antisemitic narratives.

Philip Mendes observed this on a policy level:

The increasing Jewish involvement in political radicalism ... left government authorities with a number of potential options for response. One option was to recognize the structural link between the oppression of the Jews and their involvement in the Left, and to introduce social and political reforms which ended discrimination against Jews. ... This option would have meant accepting that Jews had as much right as any other religious or ethnic grouping to freely participate in political activities. The second option ... was to reject any social or political emancipation of Jews. ... Instead, this policy blamed the Jewish victims for their persecution, and assumed that anti-Semitic legislation and violence was justified as a response to the alleged threat of 'Jewish Bolshevism'. In short, cause and effect were reversed, and Jewish responses to anti-Semitism were utilized to rationalize anti-Semitic practices.

== See also ==
- Cultural Bolshevism
- Cultural Marxism conspiracy theory
- Islamo-leftism
- Israeli Communist Party
- McCarthyism and antisemitism
