= National Democratic Party (Finland) =

Finnish political party

- Leader: Pekka Siitoin
- General Secretary: Olavi Koskela
- Vice-Chairman: Jarmo Saloseutu
- Founded: 1978
- Dissolved: 2003
- Preceded by: Patriotic Popular Front
- Headquarters: Krappula, Naantali; Vehmaa; Turku
- Newspaper: Rautaristi
- Ideology: Neo-Nazism
- Political position: Far-right
- National affiliation: National Union Council
- International affiliation: World Union of National Socialists

Party flag

The National Democratic Party (Finnish: Kansallis-Demokraattinen Puolue) was a neo-Nazi party founded in Finland by Pekka Siitoin in the summer of 1978.

== Background ==
Siitoin's party Patriotic Popular Front had been banned in 1977, and KDP was founded to continue its work. Siitoin met the future party secretary Olavi Koskela in prison in 1978. Koskela was a Stalinist who was serving his sentence for a string of firebomb attacks, but was radicalized into Nazism under the guidance of Siitoin.

== Activity ==
KDP ran its own program on the cable-tv Kylä-TV for some time in the 1980s. In 1996, Siitoin ran for the city council of Naantali with the slogan "Elect Siitoin the Nazi to the council" and was the fifth most popular candidate, but was not elected due to the D'Hondt method as he was running on his own list.

KDP members were behind the arson of Punanurkka, a communist party youth meeting place in Lappeenranta.

== Program ==
KDP was notable for being the first party in Finland to support universal basic income. KDP opposed capitalism and communism according to its program, supported returning Karelia to Finland and total ban on immigration, except for kindred Finno-Ugric people. KDP also supported fascist corporatism and banning harmful religious organizations, although Siitoin himself was arguably a cult leader, leading multiple groups blending Nazism and satanism.

== Affiliations ==
Nils Mandell, leader of the street organization of the Nordic Reich Party collaborated with KDP and introduced them to the World Union of National Socialists, to which KDP was accepted. KDP also maintained contacts with the KKK Grand Wizard David Duke and J. B. Stoner in the United States and Fédération d'action nationale et européenne in France. KDP was also in contact with some terrorist groups like Manfred Roeder's German Action Group responsible for multiple firebomb attacks in Germany that killed Vietnamese refugees and Jan Øregård of Norwegian Front that bombed a mosque and a communist event.

KDP belonged to the umbrella organization called the National Union Council, which was founded in 1994 and was chaired by Väinö Kuisma. The other member organizations were the Aryan Germanic Brotherhood, the Union of Aryan Blood and the Finnish National Front.

The group also received material from William Luther Pierce's National Alliance and sold a Finnish translation of the Turner Diaries. KDP also published material from Edward Reed Fields' The Thunderbolt, who Siitoin had met in a Nazi rally in Diksmuide.

KDP disseminated propaganda materials received from the National Socialist Liberation Front (NSLF) as leaflets. The NSLF took credit for several bombings, arsons, and shootings. This fanatical and militant propaganda gave impression of KDP as a group idolizing violence rather than as a serious political organization it wanted to be seen as.

== Headquarters ==
The party main headquarters were a manor called Krappula in Naantali. The swastika flag flown on the property was visible to the presidential residence of Kultaranta. KDP also had another manor in Vehmaa and offices in Turku.
