= Leino's prisoners =

Leino's prisoners (Finnish: Leinon vangit, Russian: Узники Лейно) was a group of 19 people deported from Finland under Minister of the Interior Yrjö Leino to the Soviet Union in April 1945.

== Background ==
After the signing of the Moscow Armistice on 19 September 1944, which brought an end to the Continuation War between Finland and the Soviet Union, an Allied Control Commission (ACC) headed by Andrei Zhdanov arrived in Helsinki to observe Finland's compliance with the armistice. The subsequent repatriations of POWs between the both nations allowed Soviet intelligence to collect voluminous information on white émigré activities in Finland, as well as on other anti-Soviet intelligence and propaganda activities there.

After analysis of the collected information, the SMERSH department of the ACC requested the Finnish State Police (ValPo) to extradite and hand over 22 individuals accused of involvement in anti-Soviet activities. The activities included recruitment of Soviet POWs to the Russian National People's Army and the Russian Liberation Army, two collaborationist military units led by Russian émigrés, during the Winter War and the Continuation War, as well as contacts with Finnish and Japanese intelligence.

The Soviet request was approved by Interior Minister Leino. The listed individuals were arrested on the night of 20–21 April 1945, immediately flown in a special airplane from Helsinki-Malmi Airport to Moscow, and brought to the headquarters of the NKVD in the Lubyanka Building. Of the extradited individuals, ten were Finnish citizens (two ethnic Finns and eight White émigrés) and nine were stateless Nansen passport holders.

After months of interrogation, all of the extradited were sentenced to harsh punishments; most of them were placed in Gulag labor camps, while at least one of them were executed. Five of them died while imprisoned or in camps, two of them took Soviet citizenship and chose to remain in the Soviet Union after serving their sentences, while the remaining individuals returned to Finland after receiving amnesties between 1954 and 1956. Those who returned were paid compensation by the Finnish government after their return. Leino was forced to resign as Minister for misconduct of his duties in 1948, after the extraditions became publicly known.

== List of "Leino's prisoners" ==
The original list handed over by Zhdanov included 22 names, of which three are not listed below: Nikolai Bastamov, Georgi Alekseev, and Alexander Kalashnikov. Bastamov was receiving medical treatment in Sweden at the time, and was thus not arrested; Alekseev, a French citizen, also managed to escape to Sweden and evaded arrest. Kalashnikov, whose real name was Nikolai Belyanski, was a Soviet POW who had chosen to remain in Finland following the Moscow Armistice. He was thus meant to have been repatriated to the Soviet Union in the autumn of 1944, making his case differ from the others listed. He was handed over together with the other prisoners.

Name	Year of birth and death	Citizenship	Sentence in the Soviet Union	Notes
Vladimir Bastamov	1906–1982	Nansen passport	20 years in prison camp	A member of the Russian All-Military Union (ROVS) in Finland and an officer of the RNA. During the Continuation War, he worked as an interrogator at a POW camp in Köyliö. He returned to Finland on 31 July 1956. After his return, he was placed under surveillance by the Finnish Security and Intelligence Service (SUPO) due to his contacts with the National Alliance of Russian Solidarists (NTS), an anti-Soviet émigré organization.
Boris Björkelund	1893–1976	Finnish	10 years of imprisonment	Born in St. Petersburg to Finnish-Swedish parents, and emigrated to Finland. After working for the Finnish Defence Command and for White émigré organizations for 18 years, he ran an antique shop during the last years before his arrest. He returned to Finland in November 1955, and published his memoirs about his imprisonment in 1966.
Pjotr Bystrejevski	1904–1948	Finnish		Died of starvation in Vladimir prison in 1948.
Richard Dahm	1886–1958	Finnish	5 years in prison camp	Dahm was a German who had been granted Finnish citizenship in 1919. He was a member of the NSDAP, and worked as an assistant and interpreter for the Abwehr office in Helsinki during the war. After serving his five-year sentence, he was deported to Dudinka in Siberia. He returned to Finland in 1954.
Dmitri Daragan	1907–1991	Nansen passport	15 years of imprisonment	Daragan was born in Liepāja and held a degree in engineering. He joined the NTS while living in Belgium in the 1930s, but seems to have left the organization in 1938, and returned to Finland the same year. During the war he served in the Finnish Navy and was promoted to the rank of lieutenant-commander. He then worked as a translator and interpreter in the civilian sector. Daragan returned to Finland in 1956.
Severin Dobrovolsky	1881–1946	Nansen passport	Death sentence	During the Russian Civil War, Dobrovolsky had been a military prosecutor for the White Army in Arkhangelsk Governorate under General Yevgeny Miller. After the defeat of the Whites he fled to Finland, where he worked as an editor of émigré newspapers and headed a group of Russian fascists. Dobrovolsky was sentenced to death by the Military Tribunal of the Moscow Military District in November 1945, and executed in January 1946.
Dimitri Kuzmin-Karavajev	1892–1985	Finnish	10 years in prison camp	Returned to Finland in 1955.
Vladimir Kuznetsov	1894–1947	Finnish	20 years in prison camp	Arrested due to connections with the Japanese embassy, where his wife worked as a typist. Died in an unknown prison camp in 1947.
Maximilian Loudon	1889–1947	Nansen passport	10 years in prison camp	A baron, Loudon had worked as a chauffeur for the Romanian embassy in Helsinki, and had also been associated with the Mladorossy. He died in a prison camp of paralysis in 1947.
Vasili Maksimov (later Vilho)	1918–1993	Finnish	15 years in prison camp	A case of mistaken identity: Maksimov was mixed up with his politically more active uncle and namesake. Returned to Finland in 1955.
Georgi Narbut (Juri Narbuth)	1896–1951	Finnish	20 years in prison camp	Narbut was born in St. Petersburg, but had lived in Finland since childhood. He worked as a Finnish intelligence officer from the early 1920s, but was captured while on a mission in St. Petersburg in 1922 and sentenced to death for espionage, which was commuted to a five-year prison sentence. He returned to Finland in a 1926 prisoner swap and was active in the Brotherhood of Russian Truth and the Mladorossy. In 1929 he was granted Finnish citizenship. Since the fall of 1944 he had worked as a chauffeur for the Ministry for Foreign Affairs, and as a translator for the Allied Control Commission. He seems to have adopted pro-Soviet views in later years, having joined the Finland–Soviet Union Peace and Friendship Society. Narbut died in January 1951 in Vladimir Central Prison.
Unto Parvilahti (formerly Boman)	1907–1970	Finnish	5 years in prison camp	Returned to Finland in 1954
Stepan Petrichenko	1892–1947	Nansen passport	10 years in prison camp	Petrichenko had been one of the leaders of the 1921 Kronstadt rebellion, and fled to Finland after the uprising was suppressed by the Red Army. In 1927 he reported to the Soviet legation that he would like to restore his Soviet citizenship, but was instead ordered to work as a Soviet agent in Finland. In 1941 he was arrested by the Finnish authorities, and imprisoned until 1944. As Petrichenko was no longer useful as an agent following his arrest, he was probably arrested by the Soviets for his part in the Kronstadt rebellion. He died in 1947 during a transfer from the Usollag camp in Solikamsk to Vladimir Central Prison.
Fjodor Pihra	1909–1970	Finnish	10 years in prison camp	Pihra had served as chairman of "Zveno", a youth organization linked to the ROVS. He also had close associations with the NTS, but was not a member. Returned to Finland in 1956.
Boris Popper (later Boris Berin-Bey and Batu Berin-Bey)	1904–2000	Finnish	10 years in prison camp	Boris Popper had lived in Belgium for several years, where he developed close ties with the NTS and the ROVS, and joined a local fascist organization. After arriving in Finland he remained active in émigré and anti-Soviet organizations. During the Winter War he was placed in a detention center, but during the Continuation War he worked as an interpreter in a POW camp. He returned to Finland in 1956, and published his memoirs about his imprisonment in 1974. Popper later joined the Turku Society for the Spiritual Sciences, an esoteric Nazi group, and was made its "honorary chairman".
Georg Popper	1917–?	Nansen passport	10 years in prison camp	Returned to Finland in 1956.
Kirill Pushkareff (later Kornelius)	1897–1984	Finnish	25 years in prison camp	A naturalized Finnish citizen, Pushkareff had arrived in Finland in 1921 after deserting from the Red Army. He became an intelligence officer of the Central Detective Police (EK), and later also worked as an agent for the Abwehr and Japanese intelligence. He returned to Finland in 1955, changed his last name and joined the SUPO. In 1958 he was approached by a KGB agent, who pressured him into providing information on members of the NTS and former "Leino's prisoners". In 1961 Pushkareff was arrested as a Soviet spy by Finnish police, and sentenced to a year and six months in prison.
Andrei Sumbarov	1906–?	Nansen passport	10 years in prison camp	Sumbarov had been an activist of "Zveno", a youth organization linked to the ROVS. During the Continuation War, he had been assistant editor of a Russian-language POW newspaper. He voluntarily remained in the Soviet Union after his release.
Igor Verigin	1907–?	Nansen passport	10 years in prison camp	Verigin had been an activist of the "Zveno" youth organization. He took Soviet citizenship and remained in the Soviet Union after his release.
