= Patriotic People's Movement (1993) =

Patriotic People's Movement Isänmaallinen Kansallis-Liitto
- Abbreviation: IKL
- Chairman: Matti Järviharju
- Founded: 1993
- Preceded by: Patriotic People's Movement
- Headquarters: Ilmajoki
- Newspaper: Ajan Suunta
- Youth wing: Blue-and-Blacks
- Ideology: Finnish nationalism Greater Finland; Neofascism
- Political position: Far-right
- Slogan: Home, Religion and Fatherland

Party flag
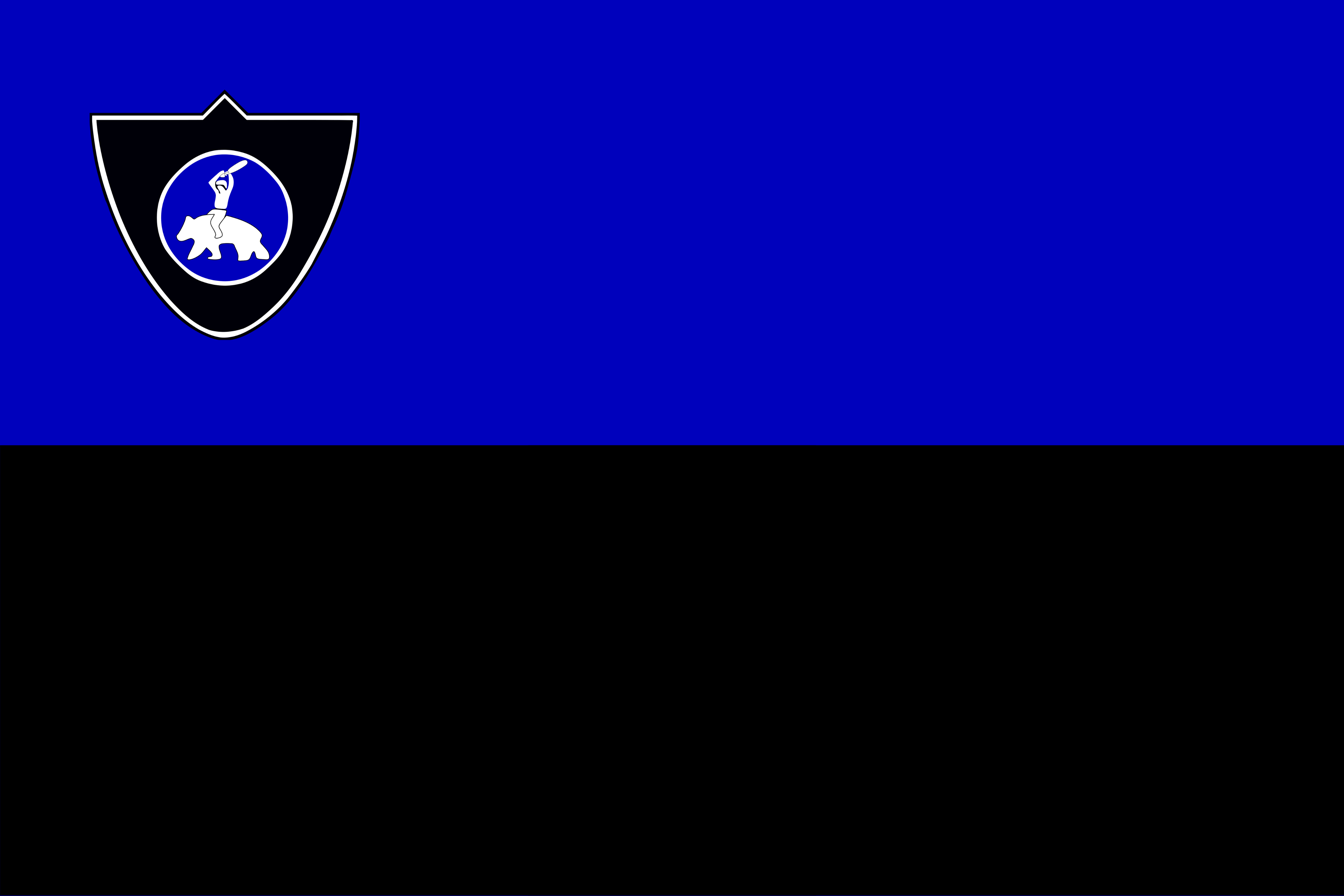

The Patriotic People's Movement (Finnish: Isänmaallinen Kansallis-Liitto, IKL) was a political organization in Finland. It regarded itself as the successor of the original Patriotic People's Movement that had operated in the interwar years until the end of the Continuation War. After a few active years and moderate success fighting for the legacy of the bankrupt populist Finnish Rural Party, IKL failed to be admitted to the party register and its activities died out after 1998.

== History ==
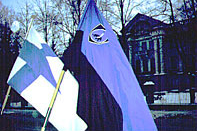
IKL flag at the Embassy of Russia, Helsinki

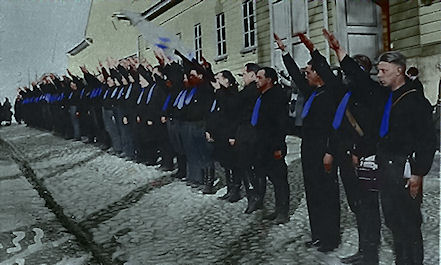
IKL salute

The history of the Patriotic People's Movement can be traced to its predecessor – also called Patriotic People's Movement (Isänmaallinen kansanliike, IKL) – that had operated in the interwar years until the end of the Continuation War. Founding fascist organizations in Finland had been outlawed by the Moscow Armistice that ended the Continuation War and was also politically impossible due to Finnish efforts to maintain working relations with the Soviet Union. This changed with the dissolution of the Soviet Union in the early 1990s that coincided with Finland renouncing the relevant statues of the Moscow Armistice. Many fascist or Nazist organizations were founded at that time. IKL, founded in 1993, was one of the most prominent. Even with the changes, authorities were initially reluctant to register the party. It, however, chose to distinguish it from the original IKL by adopting a slightly different name, Isänmaallinen Kansallis-Liitto ("Patriotic National Alliance"), IKL, and so succeeded in registration. The group was highly active in its initial years. It immediately started to collect supporter cards in order to be admitted to the party register with the intent to participate in the 1995 parliamentary election. IKL campaigned by opposing Finland's membership in the European Union, advocating for a "Greater Finland" that would include the seceded territories in Karelia.

Another development that paved the way for IKL took place in 1995 when the populist Finnish Rural Party was bankrupt. This left a void for parties with similar ideology in Finnish politics. Two political forces – IKL and True Finns – sought to replace its role. According to its chairman Matti Järviharju, IKL was the rightful spiritual successor of SMP, which he regarded in turn as the successor of the original IKL. Järviharju campaigned to get former SMP members to join IKL instead of the True Finns, succeeding in making his group a viable option to replace SMP. Initially, IKL also cooperated with neo-Nazis like Pekka Siitoin and Väinö Kuisma. Later, in the late 1990s, it also sympathized the white power movement such as the band Mistreat.

Not having succeeded in collecting the requisite number of supporter cards by 1996, its members opted to stand for the 1996 European Parliament and municipal elections on the ballots of True Finns, the National Coalition Party and the Finnish Pensioners' Party.

In 1998, the organization declared itself a political party, although it still had not been admitted to the party register. When its supporter cards were found to have inconsistencies later the same year, it withdrew its attempt to register. After the blow, it fell into disarray. Its actives Teemu Lahtinen and Jura Jukola went on to found Suomen Sisu. Järviharju gained influence in a party originally founded by Kuisma, Finland - Fatherland, that had succeeded in being admitted to the party register, and had it renamed Suomen Isänmaallinen Kansanliike in 2006. The party lost its registered status the following year. The 1993 IKL still remains as a registered association, based in Ilmajoki.

== Organization ==
The chairman of the organization was Matti Järviharju, formerly vice-chairman of the Constitutional Right Party. It had more than twenty local chapters. Its organ, Ajan Suunta was edited in professional standard and managed to be printed more than once per year and had a correspondent Belgium, Matti Repo. Its content is described by Dan Koivulaakso, Mikael Brunila and Li Andersson as "conservative and rigid". The newspaper gradually started to come out with less and less pages and the number of contributors plummeted in 1999 until it stopped appearing in 2000. The slogan of IKL was "Home, Religion and Fatherland". It adopted a black uniform, logo and flag that closely resembled that of its predecessor. The organization's youth wing was called the Blue-and-Blacks, adopting the name of the youth wing of the original IKL. When it was founded in 1995, there were grandiose, world-wide plans for activities, but it only ever held one meeting that same year with no further activities. When IKL sent a delegation a May Day march organized by France's Front National in 1996, a representative of Sinimustat was present. Efforts to form international ties continued when, in turn, Carl Lang, a Front National MEP, was present at the summer meeting of IKL and an attempt to form a network with Eastern European parties.

== See also ==
- Politics of Finland
- List of political parties in Finland
- Elections in Finland
