= Patriotic Popular Front =

Finnish political party

- Leader: Pekka Siitoin
- Secretary-General: Seppo Lehtonen
- Deputy Leader: Tapani Pohjola
- Deputy Secretary: Jari Hyvärinen
- Founded: 1976
- Banned: 1977
- Succeeded by: National Democratic Party
- Newspaper: Pohjantähti
- Membership: 100
- Ideology: Neo-Nazism
- Political position: Far-right

Party flag
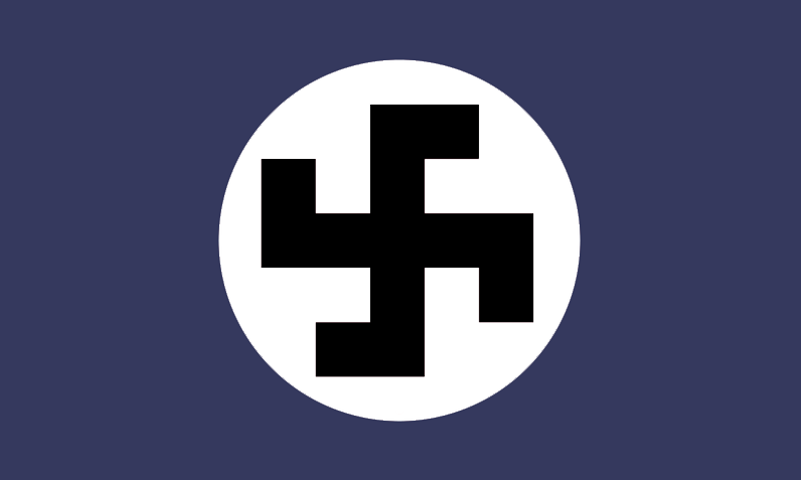

The Patriotic Popular Front (Isänmaallinen Kansanrintama, IKR) was a short-lived Finnish neo-Nazi political party founded by Pekka Siitoin.

Former French Foreign Legion soldier Timo Pekkala organized firearm drills for the group. Members of the IKR were responsible for the Kursiivi printing house arson.

== Background ==
Tiedonantaja magazine claimed that Boris Popper had acted as a financier of Siitoin and acquired weapons and ammunition from the military's warehouses for the use of Siitoin's groups. A founding member of IKR, Tapio Saarni, son of a fish shipping tycoon funded the group.

Siitoin maintained contacts with likeminded National Renaissance Party of James H. Madole that likewise blended Satanism and Nazism and Matt Koehl's American Nazi Party that promoted Esoteric Hitlerism. IKR published National Renaissance Party material in Finnish, and Siitoin appeared in NRP's publications. IKR also maintained contacts with the KKK Grand Wizard David Duke and J. B. Stoner in the United States and Fédération d'action nationale et européenne in France. IKR also recruited Finns for the war in Rhodesia in its magazine. IKR also corresponded with the CEDADE that counted Leon Degrelle among its members. IKR cooperated with Order of Flemish Militants that was led by half-Finnish Bert Eriksson and that perpetrated multiple firebomb attacks against minorities.

Siitoin also extended an invitation to Wiking-Jugend to visit him, and Wiking-Jugend did hold a camp in Finland in 1976 and created controversy by plastering posters calling for the release of Rudolf Hess.

After IKR members had sent multiple letter bombs to political enemies and held a parade in Nazi uniforms, authorities had had enough. IKR was banned in 1977 as contrary to the Paris Peace Treaty forbidding fascist organizations. However, Siitoin immediately founded a new party called the National Democratic Party.

The party operated its own printing house that published its magazine, Finnish translation of the Protocols of the Elders of Zion and holocaust denial books. According to a member list confiscated from Siitoin, the party had about 100 core members. Peripherally involved people who were involved in the distribution of material was about 1600.
