= Pekka Siitoin =

Finnish neo-Nazi and Satanist (1944–2003)

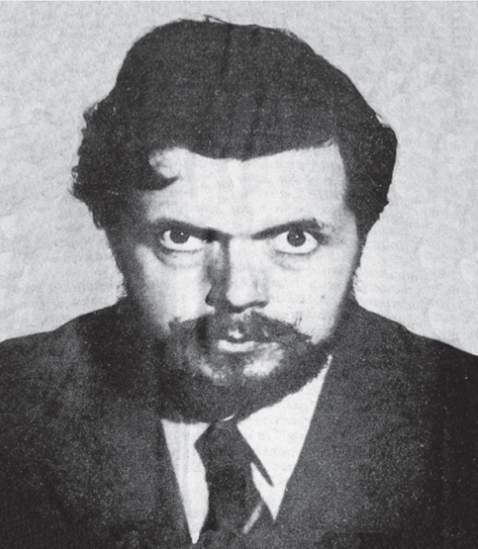
- Siitoin in 1971

Leader of the Turku Society for the Spiritual Sciences
- In office 1971–1977
- Succeeded by: Organization disbanded
- In office 1981–2003
- Preceded by: Position re-established

Leader of the Patriotic Popular Front
- In office 1976–1977

Leader of the National Democratic Party
- In office 1978–2003

Personal details
- Born: 20 May 1944 Varkaus, Finland
- Died: 8 December 2003 (aged 59) Vehmaa, Finland
- Party: National Coalition Party (1960s); Finnish Rural Party (1972); Finnish People's Unity Party (1972–1976); Patriotic Popular Front (1976–1977); National Democratic Party (1978–2003); National Union Council (1994–2003)
- Children: 6
- Education: Turku School of Economics, Theatre Academy of Finland
- Occupation: Politician; actor; photographer; film director; writer; publisher; musician

Military service
- Allegiance: Finland
- Branch/service: Finnish Army
- Rank: Corporal

Timo Pekka Olavi Siitoin (20 May 1944 – 8 December 2003) was a Finnish neo-Nazi, Satanist, and occultist.

== Early life ==
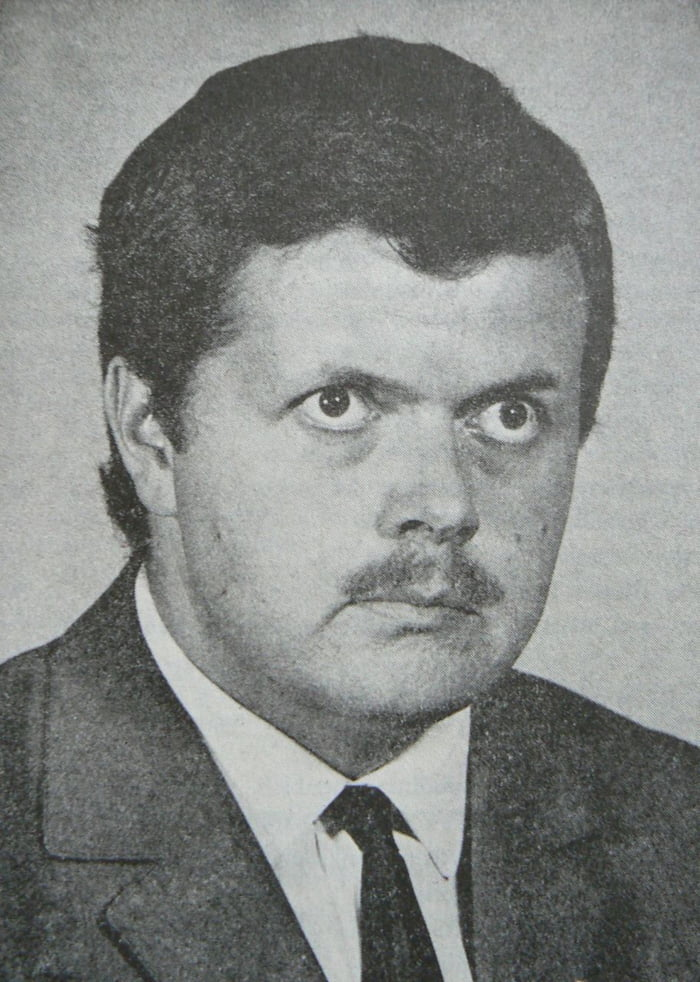
Pekka Siitoin in 1974

He was born in Varkaus, Finland. According to Siitoin, he was born to a German military officer and Finnish-Russian woman, but he was adopted after his birth. However according to a Security Police report, he was born to Hulde Sifia Rissanen and Olavi Valdemar Siitoin, who were a financially well-off married couple. Valdemar Siitoin had been a member of the Nazi Finnish People's Organisation, and Siitoin claimed to have been a Nazi since he was a child.

Pekka Siitoin completed his conscription service in Niinisalo in the Artillery Brigade and was discharged as a corporal. He studied at the Turku School of Economics and founded his own photography and filming company. The film company Siitoin-Filmi mainly made advertising and travel films. Later, the company published occult, ufology and political literature, most of which Siitoin himself wrote under pseudonyms such as Peter Siitoin, Jonathan Shedd, Hesiodos Foinix, Peter von Weltheim, Edgar Bock and Cassius Maximanus. Siitoin also had a foray into making music, publishing the album "Nauravat Natsit" (The Laughing Nazis) in 1986, variously described as neo-Nazi folk or punk. Reviews were sharply divided. Siitoin also organized a neo-Nazi music festival in 1984, described by newspapers as "Nazi disco" although this was shut down by the police.

In his youth, he studied at the Theatre Academy of Finland and was a disciple of Finland's best known clairvoyant, Aino Kassinen, who Siitoin claims introduced him to Satanism.

== Political career ==
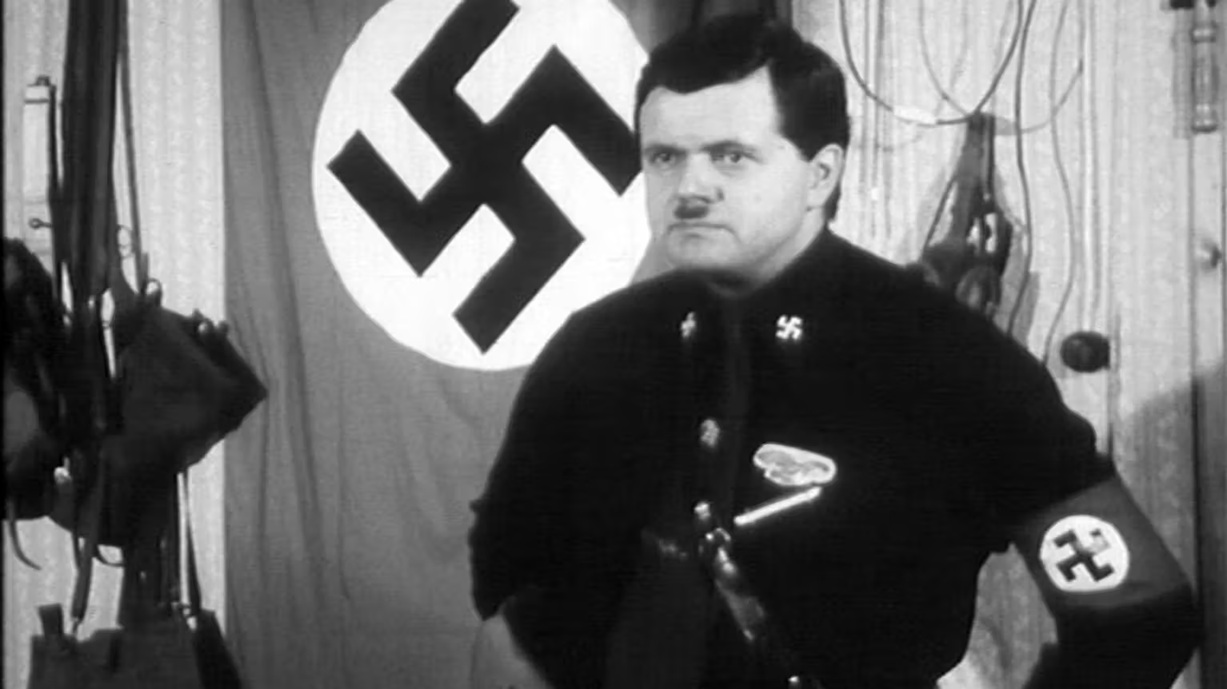
Siitoin in 1976

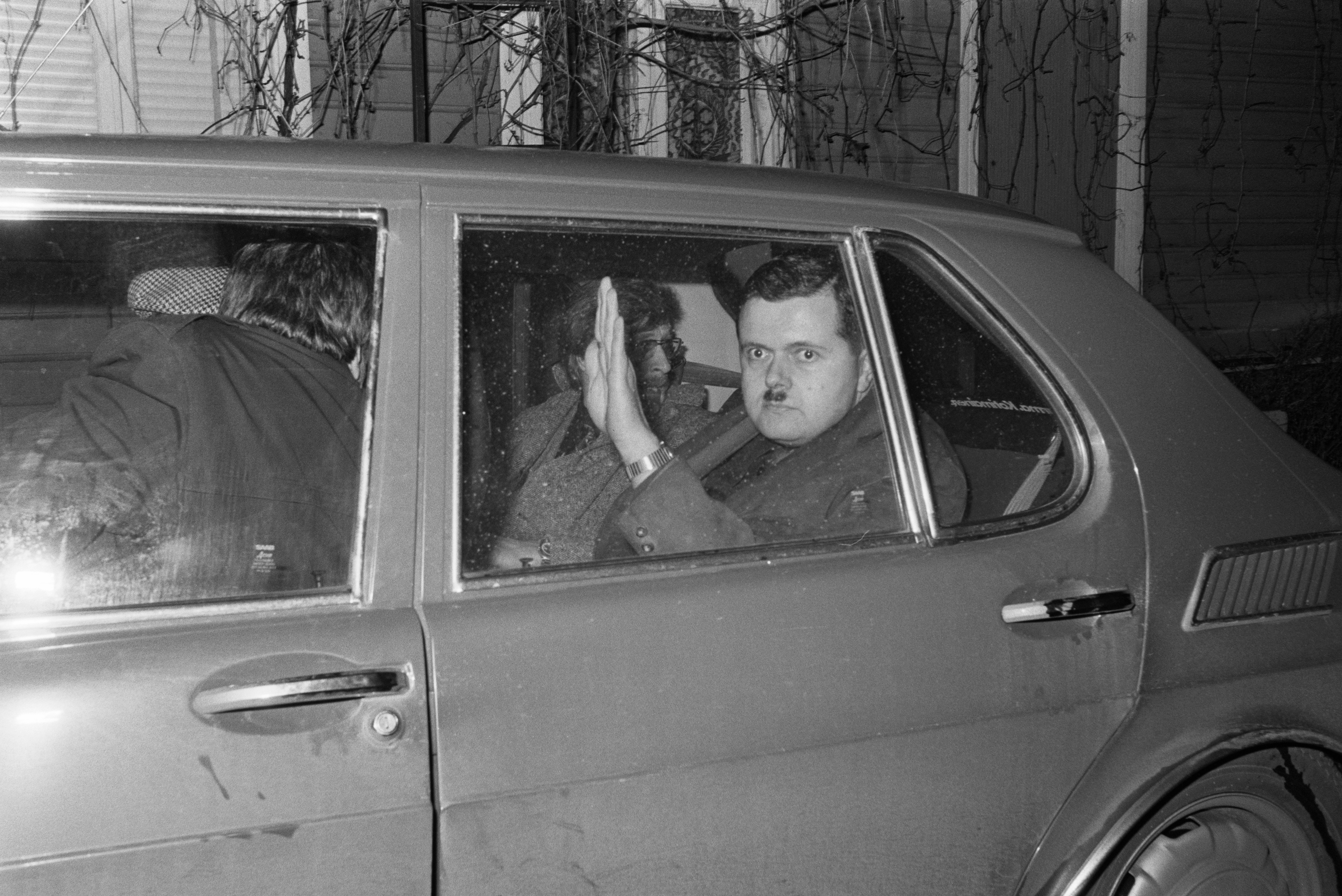
Pekka Siitoin being arrested in 1977

Siitoin had joined the Kokoomusnuoret (Youth of the National Coalition Party) in his youth, before joining the Finnish Rural Party in the early 1970s and serving as a vice-chairman of its municipal chapter. Following the breakup of the Rural Party and forming of the Finnish People's Unity Party Siitoin founded the Patriotic Popular Front (Isänmaallinen Kansanrintama, IKR), and considered himself to be Führer of the Finnish National Socialist movement. In 1971, Siitoin founded the Turku Society for the Spiritual Sciences.

Siitoin was an associate of the White Emigre satanist Boris Popper, who allegedly provided guns and explosives for his organizations, which were stolen from the Defence Forces. The IKR also corresponded with the CEDADE that counted Leon Degrelle among its members. In 1977, Siitoin was convicted of inciting the arson of the printing house Kursiivi which printed the Communist newspaper Tiedonantaja and founding an organization forbidden in the 1947 Paris Peace Treaty. He was sentenced to five years and seven months in prison, but only served three year and a half years. Siitoin had earlier been fined and convicted of cruelty to animals and vandalism against the Turku Synagogue. In November 1977 the Finnish Ministry of the Interior closed down four of the organizations he had founded, as neo-Fascist and forbidden by the 1947 Paris Peace Treaty. Later Siitoin was convicted for running a private militia and possessing illegal automatic firearms.

Siitoin established the National Democratic Party (KDP) in the summer of 1978, to replace the Patriotic Popular Front, which had been banned. The KDP was never on the party register, nor was it even a registered association. However, it functioned like an official association and the party was organized into local departments, which were led by local commanders in different areas. After the ban of the Turku Society, Siitoin's associates who remained free used the National-Mythological Society name for their publishing house from 1977, which Siitoin later adopted for his new organization in 1981 upon his release from prison.

Siitoin maintained contacts with National Renaissance Party of James H. Madole that likewise blended Satanism and Nazism. Nils Mandell, a leader in the Nordic Reich Party collaborated with Siitoin and introduced him to the World Union of National Socialists, to which the National Democratic Party (KDP) was accepted. Siitoin also maintained contacts with the KKK Grand Wizard David Duke and J. B. Stoner in the United States and Fédération d'action nationale et européenne in France. Siitoin was also invited to events in the Iraqi embassy by Baathist General Salih Mahdi Ammash. Ammash was known for his strong antisemitism, which probably was the reason for the invites. Siitoin also recruited Finns for the war in Rhodesia in his party's magazine.

KDP was also in contact with some terrorist groups like Manfred Roeder's German Action Group responsible for multiple firebomb attacks in Germany that killed Vietnamese refugees and Jan Øregård of Norwegian Front that bombed a mosque and a communist event. Siitoin's groups also cooperated with Order of Flemish Militants that was led by half-Finnish Bert Eriksson and that perpetrated multiple firebomb attacks against minorities. KDP disseminated propaganda materials received from the National Socialist Liberation Front (NSLF) as leaflets. The NSLF took credit for several bombings, arsons, and shootings. This fanatical and militant propaganda gave impression of KDP as a group idolizing violence rather than as a serious political organization it wanted to be seen as.

KDP belonged to an umbrella organization called the National Union Council, which was founded in 1994 and was chaired by Väinö Kuisma. The other member organizations were the Aryan Germanic Brotherhood, the Union of Aryan Blood and the Finnish National Front.

In 1996, Siitoin ran for the city council of Naantali with the slogan "Elect Siitoin the Nazi to the council" and was the fifth most popular candidate, but was not elected due to the D'Hondt method as he was running on his own list.

Siitoin died of esophageal cancer in Vehmaa, Finland. He was buried in Hakapelto Cemetery in Naantali. A documentary film called Sieg Heil Suomi has been made about the Neo-Nazi activities led by Siitoin and Väinö Kuisma.

== Beliefs ==
Siitoin believed in neo-Gnosticism and Theosophy and combined these with antisemitism and Satanism. To him, Lucifer, Satan and Jesus were subordinate to the Monad, and could be worshiped together. According to Siitoin Moses invented magic, but jealous Demiurge-Jehovah seeks to obscure its knowledge from the Gentiles. Lucifer was also a Promethean figure who created the original humanity and granted them wisdom so that they would evolve to be equal to Gods in time, while Jehovah created the Jewish race to usurp Lucifer's power and lord over humanity. Siitoin was also influenced by Christian apocrypha and to him Jesus was an agent of the Monad and Lucifer against the Demiurge. These are combined with elements of Finnish folk magic.

== Publications ==
- Musta Magia I [Black Magic I] (in Finnish). Turun hengentieteellinen seura. 1974. ISBN 951-99046-7-0.
- Musta Magia II [Black Magic II] (in Finnish). Turun hengentieteellinen seura. 1975. ISBN 951-9360-00-X.
- Työväenluokan tulevaisuus [Future of the Working Class] (in Finnish). Turun hengentieteellinen seura. 1975. ISBN 951-95271-3-3.
- Paholaisen Katekismus [Devil's Catechism] (in Finnish). Kansallis-mytologinen yhdistys. 1977. ISBN 951-9360-17-4.
- Laillinen laittomuus Suomessa [Legal Illegality in Finland] (in Finnish). Kansallis-mytologinen yhdistys. 1979. ISBN 951-9360-23-9.
- Rotu-oppi [The Race Doctrine] (in Finnish). Kansallis-mytologinen yhdistys. 1983. ISBN 951-9360-28-X.
- Demokratia vaiko Fasismi? [Democracy or Fascism] (in Finnish). Kansallis-mytologinen yhdistys. 1984. ISBN 951-9360-03-4.

== Discography ==
=== Studio albums ===
- Nauravat Natsit (1986)
