= Kursiivi printing house arson =

1977 arson attack in Helsinki, Finland

The Kursiivi printing house arson took place in the early morning of 26 November 1977, destroying the printing house Kursiivi in Helsinki in Lauttasaari. Kursiivi printed the newspaper of the Taistoist wing of the Communist Party of Finland Tiedonantaja, the Swedish language communist newspaper Arbetartidningen Enhet and Finnish People's Democratic League youth wing's Pioneeritoveri.

A homemade bomb was also found in the printing house, which, however, had not had time to explode. In addition, the exterior walls of the building had been defaced with swastikas. Police arrested a man suspected of setting fire on December 9. The left called on the state to take action against the far right because of the incident. The case and its litigation also attracted attention abroad.

Apparently Siitoin had an informant inside the police force who tipped him off about the investigation, leading to left-wing newspapers denouncing "fascist elements inside the police". Members of the Neo-Nazi Patriotic Popular Front were convicted of arson, including Pekka Siitoin, known neo-Nazi and occultist, party secretary Seppo Lehtonen, former French Foreign Legion soldier Timo Pekkala and two people from Kotka. In connection with the Kursiivi printing house arson lawsuit, Tiedonantaja magazine claimed that White Russian émigré Boris Popper had acted as a financier of Siitoin and acquired weapons and ammunition from the military's warehouses for the use of Siitoin's groups.
