= Rhodesian White People's Party =

- Abbreviation: RWPP
- President: Ken Rodger
- Founded: 30 January 1976
- Banned: November 1976
- Split from: Rhodesian Front
- Headquarters: P.O. Box 1929, Bulawayo
- Membership (1976): c.700
- Ideology: Neo-Nazism
- Political position: Far-right
- International affiliation: World Union of National Socialists

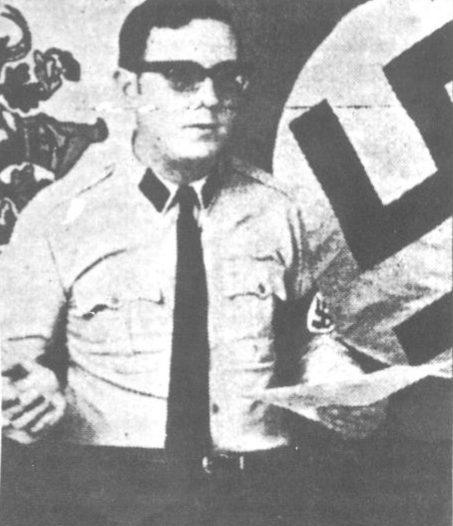
Ken Rodger in 1970

The Rhodesian White People's Party (RWPP) was a Rhodesian neo-Nazi political party led by James Kenneth "Ken" Rodger and the organizing secretary Frederick Lewis. The movement was founded in Bulawayo on 30 January 1976; it mainly inspired the American Nazi Party and later with it the National Socialist White People's Party to prevent black rule in Rhodesia. It was outlawed in November 1976 by the government of Ian Smith for antisemitic incidents by US citizens who were members of the party against the Bulawayo Hebrew Congregation. This political party was the only one of the World Union of National Socialists that was active in Africa. Its main activity was distributing Nazi literature and harassing Jews in the area. The group has been described by the Bishop Heinrich Karlen as having the "Nazi mentality of the superman."

The political party was founded at a meeting in Bulawayo, 30 January 1976, by 30 former members of the Rhodesian Front. Among its founders were the British Kenneth Rodger (former member of the National Front), the Rhodesian Eric Thompson (aka Eric Campbell), the French Jean-Pierre Marechaux, and the American Harold Covington. It was founded with the aim of fighting Communism and "terrorism", and opposing Zionism and liberalism.

The party collaborated with small racist groups such as the Valkyrie Group and had a training camp at Mount Darwin. The group had an estimate of 700 active members and 120 armed men divided into groups of 10.

The party was opposed to the government of Ian Smith for his allegedly Zionist policies and supposed defeatism in the Rhodesian Bush War, and Smith was considered by the party to be the country's greatest enemy, instead of the ZANU guerrillas who were fighting against the government in Rhodesia. Ken Rodger accused Ian Smith for being an agent of an international Communist conspiracy, backed by "international Zionism," which he said planned to destroy Christian civilization.

== See also ==
- American volunteers in the Rhodesian Bush War
- Foreign volunteers in the Rhodesian Security Forces
