= National Union Council =

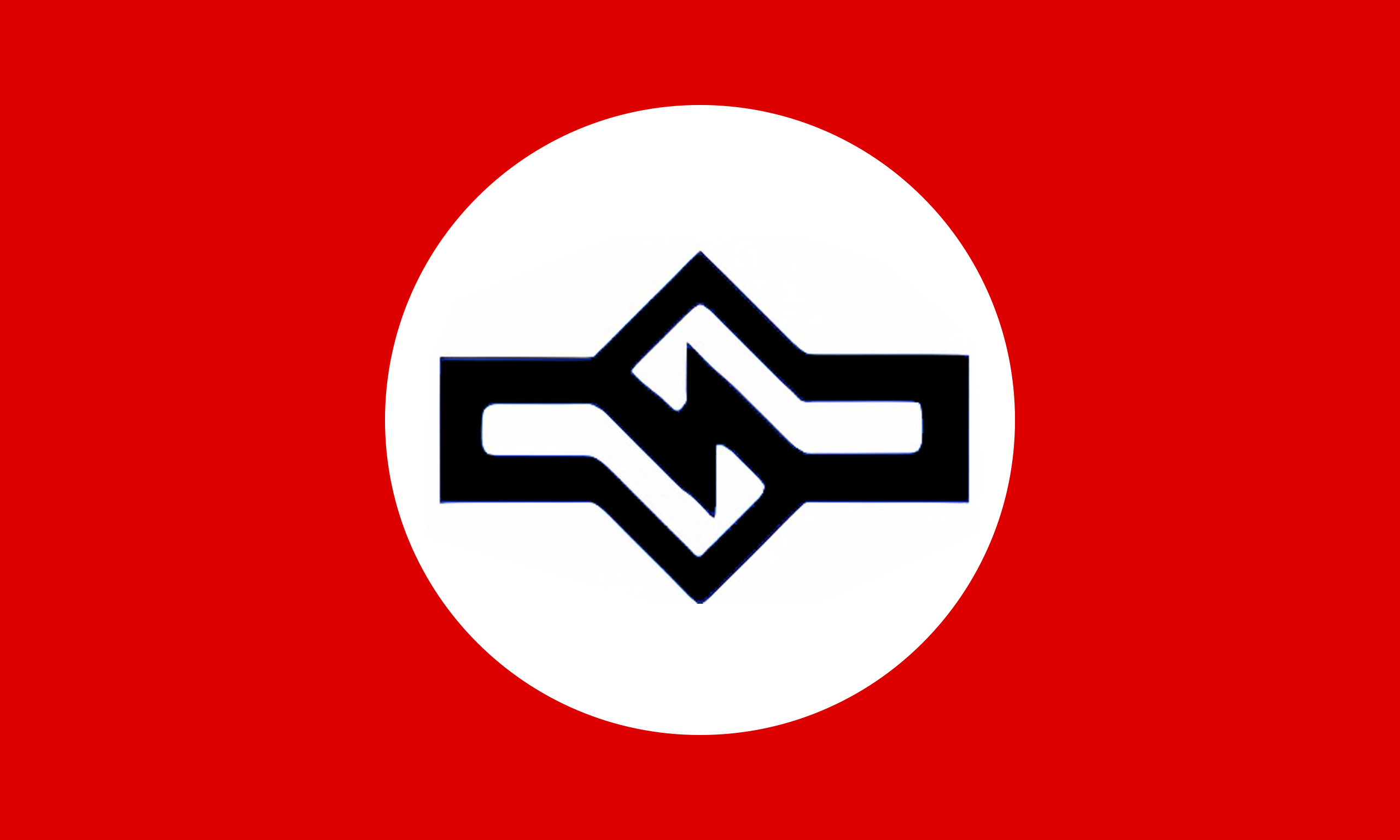
- Leader: Väinö Kuisma
- Founders: Pekka Siitoin, Väinö Kuisma
- Founded: 1994
- Ideology: Neo-Nazism
- Political position: Far-right
- Religion: Esoteric Nazism
- Members: Aryan Germanic Brotherhood; National Democratic Party; Union of Aryan Blood; Finnish National Front

The National Union Council (Kansallinen Liittoneuvosto, KLN) was an Umbrella organization of neo-Nazi groups founded in 1994 by Väinö Kuisma and Pekka Siitoin in Vehmaa, Finland. National Union Council was the subject of a documentary called Sieg Heil Suomi.

== Ideology ==
The KLN was explicitly a neo-Nazi organization, as were all the member groups. The KLN also blended Nazism and occultism, Siitoin being a notorious satanist, Kuisma adhering to Finnish neopaganism and Union of Aryan Blood holding esoteric blood ceremonies.

== Organizations ==
Member organizations of the KLN included National Democratic Party led by Pekka Siitoin, Aryan Germanic Brotherhood led by Väinö Kuisma, Union of Aryan Blood led by Kristian Arje and Finnish National Front led by Kai Aalto. The organization used the Kalevalaic "hands of the runesingers" as its symbol.

== Elections ==
In 1996, Siitoin ran for the city council of Naantali with the slogan "Elect Siitoin the Nazi to the council" and was the fifth most popular candidate, but was not elected due to the D'Hondt method as he was running on his own list. Aryan Germanic Brotherhood also managed to get an elected official to the city council of Hartola.

== See also ==
- Finnish Realm Union - 1940s Umbrella organization of Nazi groups
- Nationalist Front (United States) - Umbrella organization of neo-Nazi groups
- World Union of National Socialists - Umbrella organization of neo-Nazi groups
