= World Union of National Socialists =

International group of neo-Nazi organisations

- Abbreviation: WUNS
- Founders: George Lincoln Rockwell
- Founded: 1959
- Ideology: Neo-Nazism
- Political position: Far-right

The World Union of National Socialists (WUNS), originally the World Union of Free Enterprise National Socialists (WUFENS), is an organization founded in 1959 as an umbrella group for neo-Nazi organizations across the globe.

== History ==
In early 1959, the leader of the American Nazi Party, George Lincoln Rockwell, founded the World Union of Free Enterprise National Socialists (WUFENS), which was eventually shortened to World Union of National Socialists (WUNS), making contact with leaders of national socialist movements in other countries, including Colin Jordan.

The movement came about when Rockwell visited England and met with National Socialist Movement chief Colin Jordan and the two agreed to work towards developing an international link-up between movements. This resulted in the 1962 Cotswold Declaration, which was signed by neo-Nazis from the United States, the United Kingdom (Colin Jordan), France (Savitri Devi), and West Germany (Bruno Ludtke).

== Associated groups ==
Given the leadership of Rockwell and Koehl, the American Nazi Party and its successor the National Socialist White People's Party were the main constituent groups of the WUNS.

=== Europe ===
- WUNS was represented in Denmark by the National Socialist Movement of Denmark, a rump group of the old pre-war movement affiliated under Sven Salicath, a close follower of Rockwell.
- The Nordic Reich Party of Sweden maintained independence but co-operated closely with WUNS.
- The National Democratic Party (Finland) was accepted as member in 1981.
- Bernhard Haarde formed a WUNS group in Iceland, claiming around 300 supporters.
- In Norway, WUNS maintained connections with Erik Blücher and the magazine Folk og Land, which was composed of former members of Nasjonal Samling. The National Socialist Movement of Norway was a full member of WUNS.
- The British National Socialist Movement was a member of WUNS, and its leader, Colin Jordan, played a key role in establishing WUNS as an international organization. Its successor group, the British Movement, was also affiliated with WUNS.

=== Americas ===
- In Canada, the group was represented by the Canadian Nazi Party, whose leader William John Beattie was chief of the WUNS in the country.
- The National Socialist Movement in the United States was a member of WUNS.
- It was also active in South America through the Partido Nacionalsocialista Obrero Chileno, a group set up in Chile by Franz Pfeiffer.

=== Africa ===
- The Rhodesian White People's Party was the sole WUNS-affiliated organization in Africa.

== See also ==
- Alliance of European National Movements
- Euronat
- Political international
- National Union Council - Umbrella organization of neo-Nazi groups
- Nationalist Front (United States) - Umbrella organization of neo-Nazi groups
