= Turku Society for the Spiritual Sciences =

Occult group founded by Pekka Siitoin

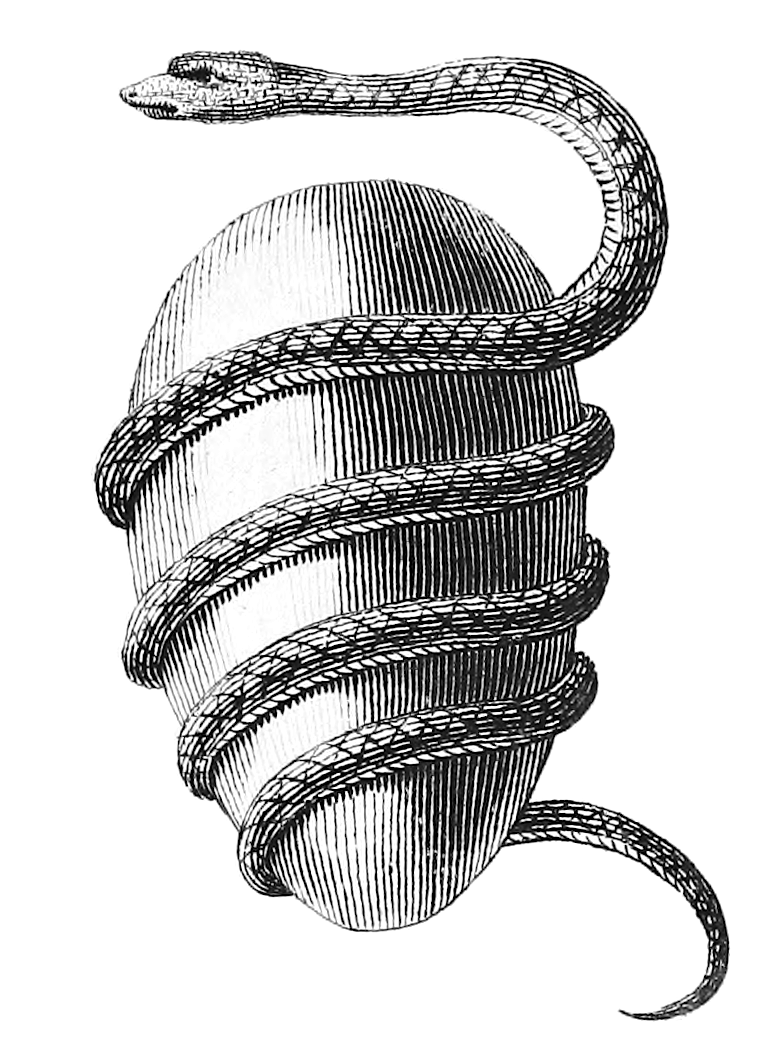
- Abbreviation: THS
- Type: New religious movement (Satanism)
- Classification: Theistic Satanism
- Orientation: Esoteric Nazism
- Theology: Neo-Gnosticism
- Structure: Magical order
- Chairman: Boris Popper
- Region: Finland (THS); Sweden (Veronica Society)
- Headquarters: Turku
- Founder: Pekka Siitoin
- Origin: 1971; 1981 (As National-Mythological Society)
- Defunct: 1977-1981; 2003 (Refounded organization)

Turku Society for the Spiritual Sciences (Finnish: Turun Hengentieteen Seura, Swedish: Åbo Andevetenskapliga Sällskap) was an occult group founded by Pekka Siitoin on September 1, 1971.

== Activities ==
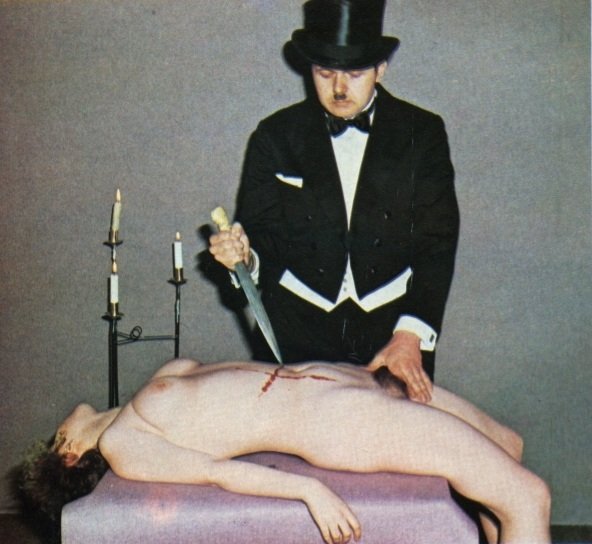
Ritual performed by Pekka Siitoin in the Turku Society for the Spiritual Sciences

The society stated its founding principles as "promot[ing] nationalist patriotic activity [and] development of Aryan spirituality". The society also stated opposition to capitalism, communism and "the Jewish religion based on Jehovah's tyranny." Speakers included Aino Kassinen, personal clairvoyant of Marshal Mannerheim, President Risto Ryti, and Johannes Virolainen. The honorary chairman of the society was Boris Popper, white emigre satanist and ex-gulag inmate. Popper would make incendiary speeches against Jewish people and communism in the society's premises. Another prominent member was ex-French Foreign Legion soldier Timo Pekkala, who acted as a military trainer for Siitoin's other neo-Nazi group Patriotic Popular Front. The society allegedly performed Satanic orgies, which researcher of religion Vesa Iitti opined might not be "far off from the truth".

Although Siitoin bragged the Society had 1000 members, the meetings usually had about 50 attendees at most.

The communists in Finnish parliament inquired about the society, whether its activities would harm the relations with the Soviet Union. The society was banned in July 1977. However, Siitoin would go on to form several, even more openly neo-Nazi groups. Several of the perpetrators of Kursiivi printing house arson in November 1977 were members of the society.

== Press ==
The society operated its own printing house that published books on the paranormal, Satanism, occultism and Holocaust denial, most of which were written by Siitoin. According to Yleisradio, the press was notable during its time for publishing Sixth and Seventh Books of Moses, or the Black Bible and making it accessible in Finnish. The society also translated and distributed their books in other Scandinavian languages. Siitoin eventually founded the Föreningen Veronica (Veronica Society), a dedicated Swedish-language book distribution operation.

== Theology ==
Siitoin believed in neo-Gnosticism and Theosophy and combined these with antisemitism and Satanism. To him, Lucifer, Satan and Jesus were subordinate to the Monad, and could be worshiped together. According to Siitoin Moses invented magic, but jealous Demiurge-Jehovah seeks to obscure its knowledge from the Gentiles. Lucifer was also a Promethean figure who created the original humanity and granted them wisdom so that they would evolve to be equal to Gods in time, while Jehovah created the Jewish race to usurp Lucifer's power and lord over humanity. Siitoin was also influenced by Christian apocrypha and to him Jesus was an agent of the Monad and Lucifer against the Demiurge. These are combined with elements of Finnish folk magic.

== Symbol ==
The society used the Cosmic egg as one of its main symbols, the serpent symbolizing Satan and being a masculine/phallic symbol, and the egg symbolizing the divine femininity, and together they symbolized eternal wisdom and life.

== Legacy ==
After the ban of the Turku Society, Siitoin's associates who remained free used the National-Mythological Society name for their publishing house from 1977, which Siitoin later adopted for his new organization in 1981 upon his release from prison.

In 2010, a group calling themselves new Turku Society for the Spiritual Sciences was founded. In 2012 they held a ritual to "consecrate Finland to Satan". About 500 people said on Facebook that they would attend the event, but it is unknown how many actually did attend.

== See also ==
- The Process Church of the Final Judgment, organization with similar theology
- Order of Nine Angles, a neo-Nazi Satanist group
