= Ragnarock =

Swedish record label

Ragnarock is a record label run by Erik Blücher in Helsingborg, Sweden. They also sell records from other companies via mail order, for instance Combat 18's company ISD Records and white power magazines such as British Oi.

The company was founded in 1993 by Lars Magnus Westrup, a former SS volunteer. After World War II he spent some time in Spain and was impressed by the use of media for propaganda purposes. When he returned to Sweden after Franco died he became head of propaganda for the Progress Party (Framstegspartiet). When he died May 16, 1995, the company was taken over by Erik Blücher. Because of their good co-operation with Combat 18 they are in direct competition with Nordland.

In October 1998 the Swedish police raided the office of Ragnarock to investigate hate speech charges and found, apart from master tapes and documentation also two fully loaded machine guns and a hand grenade.

== See also ==
- List of record labels
