= Severin Dobrovolsky =

Russian White

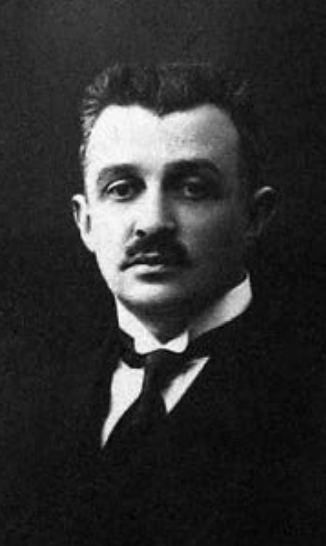
- Born: Severin Tsezarevich Dobrovolsky; September 10, 1881; St. Petersburg, Russian Empire
- Died: January 26, 1946 (aged 64); Moscow, RSFSR, Soviet Union
- Cause of death: Execution by shooting
- Occupations: White Russian political refugee and fascist propagandist
- Known for: Publishing pro-fascist propaganda

Severin Tsezarevich Dobrovolsky (Russian: Северин Цезаревич Добровольский, also Dolivo-Dobrovolsky, September 10, 1881 – 26 January 1946) was a Russian White émigré, who lived after the Russian Civil War as a political refugee in Finland. He participated in the activities of several white emigrant organizations and published pro-fascist Russian-language magazines. Dobrovolsky was turned over to the Soviet Union in 1945, where he was sentenced to death and executed.

== Early life in Russia ==
Dobrovolsky was born into an aristocratic family in St. Petersburg, but also lived in Finland in his youth. He graduated as an officer from the Pskov Cadet School in 1899 and the Constantine Artillery School in 1902, and as a military judge from the Alexander Military Law Academy in 1909. During World War I, he served as a prosecutor in St. Petersburg Military Court and with the 11th Army in Western Ukraine. He was promoted to colonel by 1916. After the October Revolution, Dobrovolsky left the army and settled in St. Petersburg, from where he fled to Terijoki in Finland in December 1918. During the Russian Civil War, from May 1919 to the spring of 1920, he served on the White side as a military prosecutor in Arkhangelsk, the capital of the Northern Oblast, ruled by General Yevgeny Miller. He received the rank of Major General in Miller's army in January 1920, but soon afterwards the Whites were defeated, and he fled to Finland again and settled in Vyborg. After that, Dobrovolsky was stateless and lived in Finland with a Nansen passport.

== Operations in Finland ==
In the 1920s and 1930s, Dobrovolsky was a key figure in Russian emigrant organizations operating in Finland and in anti-Bolshevik activism. He set up an information office in Vyborg, which collected information about the Soviet Union, and a network that smuggled anti-Soviet literature there. He also acted as a correspondent for three foreign far-right Russian-language newspapers and toured among the Russian community in Finland on topics related to politics and culture. From 1921, Dobrovolsky was the director of the Finnish branch of the Tsentr dejstvija (Center for Action), an organization founded by Nikolai Tchaikovsky, although he did not support the Tchaikovsky's Socialist Revolutionary Party. The organization sent spies and saboteurs to Soviet Russia via Finland. Dobrovolsky was later responsible for the activities of the Russian National Fascist Organization in Finland. Dobrovolsky himself was not a member of the Russian All-Military Union (ROVS), but collaborated with his old superior, General Miller, who rose to become the head of the ROVS in 1930, and assisted the organization in its efforts to infiltrate agents into the Soviet Union. Doborovolski organized the secret reconnaissance line of the ROVS to the Soviet Union through Finland in 1933–1937, which served as the intelligence unit of the Finnish General Staff.

Between 1933 and 1935, Dobrovolsky published an anti-Soviet and far-right magazine called Klitsh (“Shout”) in Vyborg. Klitsh was funded by the businessman Konstantin Aladin. The paper promoted the idea that white Russians should unite around fascism. In Helsinki, Dobrovolsky also published a magazine called Fascism.

During the Winter War, Dobrovolsky lived in Helsinki and Hamina and worked for the Propaganda Department at the Finnish headquarters, writing anti-Soviet press propaganda in Russian. At the beginning of the Continuation War, he did similar propaganda work for the State Information Service until the end of 1942.

== The extradition to the Soviet Union ==
Dobrovolsky was one of the twenty "prisoners of Leino". The Allied Control Commission accused this group of 22 men of being anti-Soviet terrorists. The Commission ordered Yrjö Leino, a communist serving his fourth day as Minister of the Interior, to arrange for their arrest and extradition to the Soviet Union. Two members of the group managed to avoid arrest. More than half of the detainees were Finnish citizens, though only two were Finns. Save for one German, the rest were Russian émigrés. Dobrovolsky was the oldest of the extradited and most notable, and was generally considered the leader of anti-Bolshevik Russian immigrants in Finland.

In the Soviet Union, Dobrovolsky was charged with leading the Finnish branch of the ROVS, espionage, infiltrating and recruiting agents, and leading terrorist attacks against the Soviet Union and an armed kidnapping attempt. Dobrovolsky denied being an agent of a foreign power, but pleaded guilty to other political crimes. No evidence was presented at the trial. Dobrovolsky was sentenced to death on November 27, 1945, by the Moscow District Court and executed on January 26 the following year.

== Family ==
Dobrovolsky's wife was the daughter of a Vyborg factory owner, Ksenia Pavlovna Ulyanova (1886–1???). They had two sons. The singer Georg Dolivo is the grandson of Dobrovolsky.

== See also ==
- List of solved missing person cases

== Sources ==
- Pjotr Bazanov: Kenraalimajuri Severin Tsezarevitš Dobrovolski, p. 556–566 teoksessa Sotavangit ja internoidut: Kansallisarkiston artikkelikirja (toim. Lars Westerlund). Kansallisarkisto, Helsinki 2008. ISBN 978-951-53-3139-7.
- Aleksi Mainio: Terroristien pesä – Suomi ja taistelu Venäjästä 1918–1939. Siltala, Helsinki 2015. ISBN 978-952-234-288-1
