= Erik Blücher =

Norwegian former neo-Nazi activist

- Born: 29 May 1953 (age 72); Moss, Norway
- Known for: Neo-Nazi leader

Erik Blücher or Tor Erik Nilsen (born 29 May 1953) is a Norwegian former neo-Nazi activist. A former party leader in Norway, he later became central in neo-Nazi networks in Scandinavia.

In 1975 Erik Blücher founded the national political party Norwegian Front on the foundation of the tiny organization National Youth League, where he himself became the leader. A new party was formed in 1980 under the name National People's Party. In 1983 Blücher moved to Helsingborg in Sweden and changed his name to Erik Nilsen. In a 2006 interview with Norwegian newspaper Stavanger Aftenblad, the first interview he made since retiring from the public spotlight in the 1980s, he calls to account neo-Nazism which he calls a "disastrous cul-de-sac" and a "scourge which has wreaked destruction for both friends and enemies." There he also claims he was never a Nazi, only a nationalist, however this is refuted by organizations which keep a tab on neo-Nazi activity across Europe.

== Early life ==
Nilsen grew up in Moss in a bourgeois home. His parents were politically inactive apart from voting for the conservatives. His father who is of ethnic German ancestry had been honoured for his participation in the resistance movement during World War II. Nilsen has described himself as a somewhat dull but well-adapted child. He was the primary candidate for the editorship of his high school newspaper.

== Political activism ==
He became a member of the Norwegian Young Conservatives, but having written an article where he called for a political party to the right of the Conservative Party, he attended the 1973 foundation meeting of Anders Lange's Party, a tax protest party which would evolve to become the Progress Party. When Norwegian Front was established Erik Blücher was its chairman from the outset. He attained to instant notoriety across the country on 30 May 1975, following his participation in a televised discussion program. He and his organization became intensely demonised from day one. Inquiries among ordinary people published by the mainstream media would readily call for the neo-Nazis to be strung up from the nearest lamppost. The main causes championed by Blücher and his group were to fight off the communists, in particular the newly formed Marxist–Leninist Workers' Communist Party and non-European migrants, in particular those from Pakistan. In the 2006 interview Nilsen states that nobody in Norway after World War II has suffered as much because of their political convictions as he has.

In the 1990s he became central in the neo-Nazi network Blood & Honour, and founded the record label Ragnarock. He has been known to use the Nazi salute and shouting "Sieg Heil" and "Heil Hitler" at neo-Nazi meetings in Sweden.
