= Boris Popper =

Russian emigrant in Finland (1904–2000)

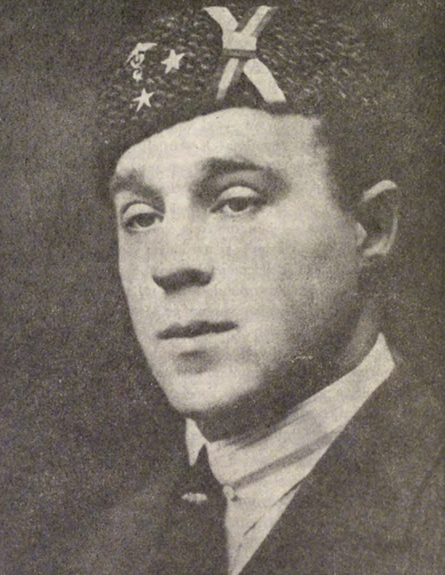
- Born: Boris V. Popper; December 19, 1904; St. Petersburg, Russian Empire
- Died: February 19, 2000 (aged 95); Helsinki, Finland
- Occupation: Automotive engineer
- Known for: Being one of the so-called Leino prisoners Anti-Soviet activism

Boris V. Popper (December 19, 1904 – February 19, 2000) was a White Russian émigré living in Finland. He was one of the Leino prisoners deported from Finland to the Soviet Union in April 1945. He later used the names Boris Berin-Bey and Batu Berin-Bey.

== Early life ==
Popper's father, a native of St. Petersburg, was a naval officer, and his mother served as the hostess of the hospital. According to his own account, Popper was half Tatar and half Ukrainian Cossack. Popper's family came to Finland as refugees shortly after the October 1917 revolution. They settled in Vyborg, where Popper's father, Vladimir Popper, worked as a businessman and landlord. Until 1926, Boris Popper attended the Vyborg Classical Lyceum.

Boris Popper was the secretary of the Vyborg Monarchist Youth League, led by Voldemar Granberg. When the Finnish authorities began to suspect the League of planning terrorist activities, Popper moved to Belgium in 1928. He studied economics for three years at the Université catholique de Louvain and participated in the activities of Russian emigrant organizations. In Belgium, he first worked as an office clerk for the l'Innovation department store company and then, from 1932, for a galvanizing plant. He graduated in Belgium with a degree in electroplating engineering and also studied automotive engineering and electronics.

== Political activity ==
In July 1938, Popper traveled to Vyborg from Brussels at the request of relatives. In Finland the state police at the time considered him a pro-fascist monarchist who had dealings with the Belgian branch of the Brotherhood of Russian Truth. The state police had received information from their agents that Popper had come to Finland to contact the Patriotic People's Movement, and in particular Paavo Susitaival, and to prepare terrorist attacks in the Soviet Union. Popper was interrogated but was then released, because State Police wanted to infiltrate Popper's inner circle. Jalmari Sinivaara, Valpo's office manager in charge of emigration, gave the task to Anatoli Toll, an emigrant who acted as an intelligence officer.

During the autumn, more information was obtained about Popper's activities: he had tried to get a guide familiar with the Soviet border regions and held a meeting in Helsinki to try to find allies among emigrant activists, among others. However, no significant information was obtained about his projects, and Jalmari Sinivaara began to suspect that this was a provocation organized by the Soviet intelligence services in which Popper acted as an intermediary. In early 1939, Popper presented to the Finns the idea of training Russian emigres as a strike team who, when an uprising in Russia began, would cross the border to lead it. Popper also tried to buy Russian military uniforms "to make a movie."

In the autumn of 1939, Popper tried to join the Vyborg White Guard, but he was not accepted because he was not a Finnish citizen. During the Winter War in February 1940, Popper was arrested and taken to a security detention facility at the Ekenäs Forced Labor Camp. During the Continuation War, Popper was an interpreter for prisoners of war from 1941 to 1943 in Syväri.

== Postwar ==
At the end of the war, Boris Popper and his younger brother Georgi Popper were extradited to the Soviet Union in April 1945 among the Leino prisoners. Popper received a 10-year prison sentence in the Soviet Union. He returned to Finland in the summer of 1956 to settle in Helsinki. The State Police at the time suspected that Popper had been recruited for Soviet intelligence. After his release Popper was active in extreme right groups and was interested in the paranormal and satanism. According to fellow prisoner of Leino Boris Björkelund Popper was "mentally destroyed" by his experiences in the gulag.

Popper wrote the book "Red Russian Meat Grinder" (fin. Venäjän Punainen Lihamylly) about his prison experiences under the pseudonym Boris Berin-Bey. The book was published by the Föreningen Veronica Association, founded by neo-Nazi Pekka Siitoin. Popper was the honorary chairman of the Turku Society for the Spiritual Sciences, founded by Siitoin, and he gave presentations at club events in the 1970s. In connection with the Kursiivi printing house arson lawsuit, Tiedonantaja magazine claimed that Popper had acted as a financier of Siitoin and acquired weapons and ammunition from the military's warehouses for the use of Siitoin's groups.
