= Finland – Fatherland =

Finland – Fatherland Suomi - Isänmaa
- Leader: Väinö Kuisma (1990-2006); Matti Järviharju (2006-2007)
- Founded: c.1990; 35 years ago
- Dissolved: 2007; 18 years ago
- Headquarters: Lahti
- Newspaper: Kansallinen Rintama (1993–2000)
- Ideology: Neo-Nazism
- Political position: Far-right
- Religion: Finnish neopaganism
- National affiliation: National Union Council (1994-?)

Finland – Fatherland was an extreme right party led by Väinö Kuisma. The organization was founded in early 1990s under the name Aryan-Germanic Brotherhood (Arjalainen Germaaniveljeskunta, AGV) and changed its name to Patriotic Right (Isänmaallinen Oikeisto, IO) in 1993. In 2002, the organization became a registered political party and was known in 2002–2003 as Finland Rises – The People Unite (Suomi Nousee – Kansa Yhdistyy, SNKY). IO/AGV was also a member of the National Union Council, an umbrella organization of neo-Nazi groups, led by Pekka Siitoin and Kuisma, both notorious neo-Nazi occultists.

After the IO submitted the registration application, the association registry office requested Finnish Security and Intelligence Service for a statement on the background of the association. In their reply, Intelligence Service stated close links with the neo-Nazi Aryan Germanic Brotherhood. IO was admitted to the association register in August 1994. The association was considered neo-Nazi.

Patriotic Right published Kansallinen Rintama magazine that included articles on Kuisma's blend of Finnish mythology with Esoteric Nazism, Kalevala and Evolian magical fascism. IO's activities were based in Lahti. In Turku and Joensuu, the party cooperated with white power skinheads. IO's local chapter in Turku organised, among other things White Power concerts.

Under the name Finland Rises – The People Unite, the association was admitted to the party register in November 2002. It contested the parliamentary elections of 2003 under this name before changing it to Finland – Fatherland for the municipal elections of 2004. Under a new leadership, the party participated in the parliamentary elections of 2007 as the Patriotic People's Movement of Finland (Suomen Isänmaallinen Kansanliike, SIK) before it was removed from the party register for failing to win seats in two consecutive elections.

== Program ==
The party's programme included opposition to refugees and capitalism, emphasis on Finnishness, and among other things anti-semitism, anti-Americanism, as well as drawing inspiration from Finnish pagan heritage.

== Elections ==
The only elected official Finland – Fatherland had was Janne Kujala of the Hartola town council, who defected to Finland – Fatherland mid-term from the National Coalition Party. In addition to the National Union Council, IO was member of electoral alliance consisting of IO, Olavi Mäenpää's ultranationalist Finnish People's Blue-Whites and Matti Järviharju's neofascist Patriotic People's Movement (1993) that managed to get three seats in Turku. After the demise of the party, AGV activist Petri Luumi became a candidate for the far-right Finns Party.
