= Norwegian Front =

Norwegian Front National People's Party Norsk Front Nasjonalt Folkeparti
- Leader: Erik Blücher (1975–81)
- Founded: 1975
- Dissolved: 1991
- Ideology: Neo-fascism; Neo-Nazism; Norwegian nationalism Anti-communism; Anti-immigration
- Political position: Far-right

The Norwegian Front (Norwegian: Norsk Front, NF) was a neo-fascist extraparliamentary political party in Norway founded in 1975, led by Erik Blücher as fører. Following a bomb attack by an activist from the party, the NF was dissolved in 1979 and succeeded by the National People's Party (Nasjonalt Folkeparti, NF), which itself was dissolved in 1991 after several leading members had received long prison sentences following another bomb attack. The NF had around 1,400 members at its peak.

== History ==
=== Norwegian Front ===
The NF was founded in 1975 as a successor to the minor National Youth League (Nasjonal Ungdomsfylking, NUF), affiliated with former members of Nasjonal Samling. It was founded by a young generation of neo-Nazis, nationalists and anti-communists, and areas of focus included opposition to immigration, fight against the Workers' Communist Party as well as "American finance capital", and Holocaust denial. After being prevented from registering publicly as a political party, and following repeated attacks from anti-fascists, the group turned towards violence and terrorism which garnered much media attention.

The party had links to the French National Front and the World Anti-Communist League (WACL). The 12th WACL general conference in Paraguay in 1979 was attended by a delegate from the party, whose journey was reportedly subsidised by the leader of the Arab delegation Sheikh Ahmed Salah Jamjoom. Some members of the party reportedly fought for Rhodesia in the Rhodesian Bush War.

The NF was dissolved in 1979 after an activist from the group threw a homemade bomb against the annual May Day demonstration, leaving two people wounded.

=== National People's Party ===
Not long after, the party was succeeded by the National People's Party; the two parties effectively the same. Opposition to immigration became its main focus. Blücher however stepped down as leader in 1981 to pursue extreme-right connections abroad. On 13 June 1985, a young activist from the party detonated a bomb outside an Oslo Ahmadiyya mosque. Several of the party's leading members received prison sentences in the aftermath of the bombing for various activist offences. The party was dissolved in 1991, and remaining members were encouraged to join the Fatherland Party.
