= Tiedonantaja =

- Type: Monthly newspaper
- Format: tabloid
- Publisher: Kustannusyhtiö TA-Tieto Oy
- Editor-in-chief: Petra Packalén
- Founded: 1968; 58 years ago
- Political alignment: Marxist
- Language: Finnish
- Headquarters: Helsinki
- Circulation: 6,000 (2010)
- Sister newspapers: Arbetartidningen Enhet 1974–1988
- ISSN: 0356-1631
- Website: tiedonantaja.fi

Tiedonantaja (Finnish pronunciation: [ˈtie̯donˌɑntɑjɑ], "Informant") is a Finnish leftist monthly newspaper published in Helsinki, Finland. It is the party organ of the new Communist Party of Finland (SKP).

Tiedonantaja's current editor-in-chief is Petra Packalén who was preceded by Marko Korvela (2012–2018) and Erkki Susi (1983–2012).

== History and profile ==
Tiedonantaja was founded in 1968 as the paper of the taistoist minority faction of the Communist Party of Finland until the opposition was expelled in the mid-1980s. During the 1970s and in the first half of the 1980s Kansan Uutiset represented the moderates in the party whereas Tiedonantaja was the organ of the doctrinaire faction. In the late 1980s, the paper was also the organ of the electoral front, Democratic Alternative.

Tiedonantaja was first published irregularly by the Uusimaa district organisation of the SKP. It became a nationwide publication after other taistoist districts joined, and in 1970 the paper began to be published on a weekly basis. In 1972, Tiedonantaja was published three times a week and from 1973 onwards, four times a week. The paper reduced back to its weekly format in 1990. Tiedonantaja became a monthly newspaper in 2018.

In the 1970s, Tiedonantaja had a circulation of about 30,000. Its circulation was 6,000 copies in 2010. Over 50,000 people sent May Day and new year's greetings, which were published in the special editions.
