= Emmanuel Trujillo =

American spy and peyotist

Emmanuel Trujillo (May 25, 1930 – June 24, 2010), also known by the pseudonyms Mana Truhill and Immanuel Pardeahtan Trujillo, was an American anti-Nazi spy and peyotist of Chiricahua Apache descent.

After serving in the British Merchant Navy and the U.S. Army, he came into contact with the Native American Church. In the early 1950s, he infiltrated the National Renaissance Party (NRP), a neo-Nazi movement led by James Madole, on behalf of the Non-Sectarian Anti-Nazi League (NSANL). He rose through the ranks of the NRP until he led several sectors, before being expelled in 1954.

In 1977, he founded the Peyote Way Church of God in Klondyke, Arizona, a syncretic organization blending peyotism with elements of the Latter Day Saint movement, within which he advocated for unrestricted access to peyote for religious use regardless of race. He was also the founder of Mana Earthenware, a pottery studio whose pieces are included in the Smithsonian Institution's Native American collections.

== Biography ==
=== Background ===
Emmanuel Pardeahtan Trujillo was born on May 25, 1930, in New Brunswick, New Jersey, the son of a Catholic mother of French-German descent and of Juan Pardeahtan Trujillo, a Chiricahua Apache from Mexico and an alleged member of Geronimo's tribe. His father died shortly after his birth, and his mother, then 14 years old, abandoned him. He spent his first two years in an orphanage before being adopted by an Irish Catholic family in the eastern United States under the name James J. Coyle. At age 15, he ran away and enlisted in the British Merchant Navy, then joined an airborne division of the U.S. Army in 1947 before being discharged the following year following an accident during a parachute jump.

He later learned that he had been adopted and, among the beneficiaries named in his biological father's will, found Eugene Yoakum, a veteran of the Philippine–American War and a hermit in the Sonoran Desert; and Bill Russell (known as "Apache Bill"), a ceremonial doctor of the Native American Church. The latter two initiated him into peyote during a three-day solitary retreat. Trujillo joined the Native American Church in 1948 and became a "roadman," that is, responsible for conducting peyote ceremonies. Eugene Yoakum and potter Charlie Smith, another former companion of his father, also taught him traditional techniques of silversmithing, turquoise work, and pottery.

=== Infiltration of the National Renaissance Party ===
National Renaissance Party logo

In the early 1950s, he moved to the Washington Heights, Manhattan, took classes at the Jefferson School of Social Science, which was affiliated with the Communist Party, and frequented New York biker circles. According to the Anti-Defamation League (ADL), he reportedly described himself as an "out-and-out communist." In May 1952, he attended a meeting of the National Renaissance Party, a neo-Nazi movement led by James Madole, and immediately decided to infiltrate it under the pseudonym Mana Truhill. He offered his services to James Sheldon's Non-Sectarian Anti-Nazi League, which accepted him as an agent, despite Sheldon's suspicions about Trujillo's true allegiances. Trujillo provided reports on the activities of James Madole and the networks of Frederick C. F. Weiss. The ADL also claims to have been approached by Trujillo in 1953 to sell them information.

His apartment on Audubon Avenue then served as an informal office for the NRP, where Nazi activists, communists, and members of motorcycle gangs mingled, earning Trujillo the nickname "Cochise". Trujillo quickly rose through the ranks of the organization, eventually co-leading its elite guard, then overseeing relations with the Ku Klux Klan and East Coast fascist groups, as well as foreign affairs. He also convinced communist activist Irene Dovale to infiltrate the NRP under the alias Ruth Ross in order to establish a women's section within the group.

Starting in the fall of 1953, he corresponded with more than 140 leading figures in international neo-Nazism—including Johann von Leers in Argentina, Otto Ernst Remer and Hans-Ulrich Rudel in Germany, and the Swedish fascist leader Per Engdahl—and passed all of this information on to the NSANL, the FBI, and the CIA. In November 1953, the Anti-Defamation League Bulletin published an article revealing that Mana Truhill was in fact Emmanuel Trujillo, a communist infiltrator, and that he had previously attempted to sell his information on the NRP to the ADL in exchange for payment. Far from leading to his expulsion, the revelation paradoxically strengthened his position within the party: Madole publicly defended him, and his European fascist correspondents renewed their support for him.

In January 1954, just as the network he had helped build was preparing to unite at a fascist conference in Rome, Trujillo attempted to take advantage of the confusion caused by the affair to seize control of the NRP, proclaiming himself party leader and appointing Irene Dovale as secretary. Madole and Weiss rejected this attempt to seize power, though they attributed it to a momentary fit of madness, and Trujillo retained his influence within the organization's leadership. He pushed the NRP toward a more radical form of Nazism in order to dispel any lingering suspicion.

Following the Brown v. Board of Education decision handed down on May 17, 1954, which abolished racial segregation in American public schools, Madole and Weiss sent Trujillo on a motorcycle tour of the South and the Midwest to forge alliances with nationalist groups opposed to the decision, with instructions to provoke riots and stir up resistance. The operation was nevertheless compromised when Ed Fields, passing through New York, discovered posters of Stalin, Lenin, and Marx in Trujillo's apartment instead of the usual Nazi portraits. In August 1954, H. Keith Thompson published a series of articles in the Exposé magazine revealing the infiltration of the NRP by Trujillo and Irene Dovale, who were presented as NSANL agents linked to the Communist Party. Madole then announced Trujillo's expulsion. In December 1954, the preliminary report of the House Committee on Un-American Activities on neo-fascist groups named Trujillo among the leaders of the NRP and recommended legal action, though no charges were ever filed.

In August 1955, despite Trujillo's expulsion from the NRP, Weiss sent him on a mission to Las Vegas, where he rubbed shoulders with people he himself described as communists who knew Weiss and yet collaborated with him. That same year, Trujillo became involved in the Jelke case, named after a young man from high society who was on trial for running a call girl ring, which included Pat Ward, Trujillo's former girlfriend. Trujillo had suggested to Mickey Jelke's lawyer that they set a trap for Ward by recording her in order to discredit her testimony against the prosecution. Erotic literature publisher Samuel Roth later published Trujillo's memoirs, which recounted this relationship and his undercover work.

In January 1956, he was arrested in Montreal for attempted marijuana trafficking and sentenced to two years in prison, which brought his career as an agent to an end. While he was still incarcerated, H. Keith Thompson attempted to meet with him in 1957 with a view to publishing his account of the drug world. After his release from prison, Trujillo briefly tried to make a living by selling marijuana in New York. In 1961, he traveled to Cuba, where he joined the ranks of the Cuban Revolutionary Armed Forces.

=== Peyote Way Church of God ===
During the 1960s, he befriended Harvard psychologist and LSD pioneer Timothy Leary, who became one of his followers, and participated in the activities of the League for Spiritual Discovery in Millbrook, New York. He left the Native American Church in 1966 to establish his own organization, the Church of Holy Light, following the Native American Church's decision to restrict the use of peyote to individuals with at least 25% Native American ancestry, under pressure from the U.S. federal government. Trujillo rejected this restriction in the name of universal access to the sacrament.

In 1977, under the name Immanuel Pardeahtan Trujillo, he founded the Peyote Way Church of God in Klondyke, Arizona, with Anne Zapf and Matthew Kent, a church that incorporated the use of peyote into its religious ceremonies, in continuation of the Church of Holy Light. It was officially registered as a nonprofit organization in 1981. The organization sold pottery and, in exchange for a donation, provided the setting and peyote tea necessary for the practice of the "spirit walk", a solitary retreat in the desert during which the participant ingests peyote for the purpose of spiritual journeying. It is based on a syncretism between peyotism and the Latter Day Saint movement, a tradition dating back to the Oto Church of the First-Born, founded in 1914 by Jonathan Koshiway, a former Mormon evangelist. Peyote is interpreted there as a medicinal herb sanctioned by section 89 of the book of Doctrine and Covenants. The Peyote Way Church of God also adopts the ecclesiastical structure of the Latter Day Saint movement (apostles, deacons) and its concept of direct revelation.

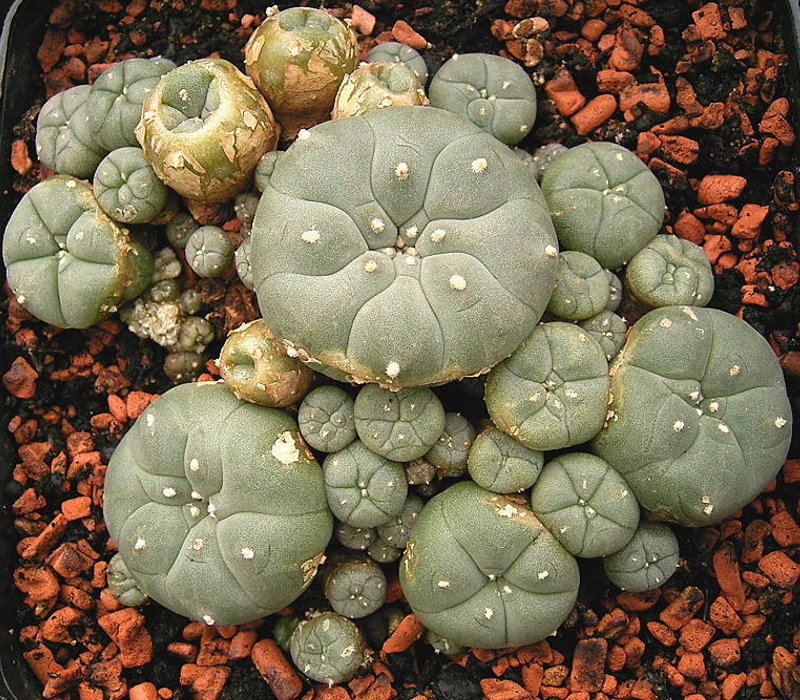
Peyote

Trujillo was repeatedly involved in legal cases related to the possession of peyote, and won several lawsuits against local authorities seeking to ban the religious use of peyote. As early as 1967, he was prosecuted in Denver for illegal possession of peyote, but was acquitted after establishing that this possession was part of religious practice. In 1986, he was arrested for speeding and was once again charged after a police officer discovered a peyote button in his possession, which Trujillo immediately placed in his mouth, "in prayer." He was released the same day, and the jury returned a not-guilty verdict, as Arizona law protects the use of peyote within the context of sincere religious practice.

He was also the founder of Mana Earthenware, a pottery studio located in the Aravaipa Canyon Valley in southeastern Arizona, developed in partnership with Anne Zapf and Matthew Kent. Some of the studio's pieces are included in the Smithsonian Institution's Native American collections.

=== Death ===
Trujillo died in his church on June 24, 2010.

== See also ==
- Peyote Way Church of God, Inc. v. Thornburgh, a court case which involved Trujillo's church
