= Frederick Charles Weiss =

German-American neo-Nazi (1886–1968)

Weiss in the late-1940s

Frederick Charles Weiss (July 31, 1885 – March 1, 1968) was a German-American neo-Nazi activist. He was the founder of publishing house Le Blanc, through which he published numerous antisemitic pamphlets, and helped establish and finance the National Renaissance Party (NRP), the first postwar neo-Nazi group in the United States, which he led from behind the scenes. In the 1950s, his writings began to reflect a geopolitical perspective favorable to the Soviet Union, which he viewed as a potential ally for Germany.

== Biography ==
=== Early life ===
Frederick Charles Ferdinand Weiss was born in Pforzheim (Baden-Württemberg) on July 31, 1885, the son of a wealthy German industrialist who lost his fortune by 1918. A graduate of the universities of Heidelberg and the Sorbonne, he became a patent attorney and served as an artillery captain in the German army during World War I after a brief stay in the United States in 1910.

In the 1930s, he emigrated to Manhattan, where he became a real estate agent. During World War II, as a German national, he was declared an enemy alien and interned on Ellis Island, although he claimed never to have been a member of the German American Bund or the NSDAP.

=== Activism ===
As early as 1946, he began to move in American far-right circles. He founded the publishing house Le Blanc (a reference to his last name, as "Weiß" means "white" in German, and "blanc" means the same thing in French), which published his pamphlets in English and produced antisemitic material intended for Germany. The Federal Republic of Germany prohibited them within its territory. He regularly organized racialist gatherings at his farm in Mount Hope, New York. He considered himself more of an agent working in the interests of Germany than an activist on the American right. The American Jewish Committee, whose agents were monitoring him, viewed him "as a man of great vitality and determination" who was involved in international neo-Nazi networks, and not merely as an eccentric. In 1953, agents from the Anti-Defamation League reported that he was in contact with leading figures in fascism, antisemitism, and extreme nationalism around the world.

NRP logo

In January 1949, he helped found and finance the National Renaissance Party, the first postwar neo-Nazi group in the United States. Although he held no official position within the party, he ran it from behind the scenes and used it to spread his propaganda around the world. He financed the NRP official leader, James Madole, whom he regarded, however, merely as a useful "messenger" for distributing his literature. He said of him:

"We use all kinds of characters. We have such a shortage of leaders, I would use the very Devil himself if I thought it would help get us what we are after. Madole is basically honest but fanatical and ignorant. I find him convenient to run errands and I also can put whatever I please into his Renaissance Bulletin. He sends the publication to a list of about a thousand names. His contributors carry half the cost and I'm saved the bother of distributing."

Weiss collaborated with Mana Truhill—whose real name was Emmanuel Trujillo and who was actually a Non-Sectarian Anti-Nazi League undercover agent within the NRP—on writing articles for the NR Bulletin and sending propaganda to foreign correspondents. He shared his list of contacts within transnational neo-Nazi networks with Truhill and entrusted him with the leadership of the NRP's foreign division. Weiss also financed his travels, notably a recruitment tour of the American South and Midwest following the Brown v. Board of Education ruling in 1954, and a trip to Europe aimed at strengthening ties with neo-Nazi movements in Germany, Italy, Spain, and Sweden. Deeming Madole too impetuous, Weiss placed Truhill at his side rather than dismissing him, so as not to destabilize the organization. Despite discovering in June 1954 that Truhill was acting as an informant, Weiss financed a trip for him to Las Vegas in August 1955 so that he could work with nationalist circles there. At the same time, Truhill continued to send reports to the Non-Sectarian Anti-Nazi League on his activities on behalf of Weiss, until Truhill's arrest in Montreal in January 1956.

In July 1953, Fred Weiss was involved in an attempt to sell a weapon of mass destruction to Gamal Abdel Nasser's Egypt. Francis Parker Yockey, acting as an intermediary, met personally with Lieutenant Colonel Nasser to discuss the weapon. In a publication titled Max Planck and the Future of Western Civilization, Weiss predicted the imminent creation of a cobalt bomb capable of destroying four city blocks. According to journalist Kevin Coogan, it would seem unlikely that Weiss could have developed such a weapon on his own. He suggests that Weiss and Yockey may have served as intermediaries for Nazi scientists based in Argentina. The attempted sale did not go through.

=== Death ===
He died on March 1, 1968.

== Political affiliations ==
=== Relations with the American far right ===
In the summer of 1951, through Hans-Ulrich Rudel, Fred Weiss met H. Keith Thompson in New York, who was then acting as an agent for the Sozialistische Reichspartei and the German-language Argentine neo-Nazi newspaper Der Weg. The two men developed a close professional relationship and met regularly. Together, they maintained close ties with the Wiking-Jugend through their publishing house, Le Blanc.

In November 1951, Fred Weiss met Francis Parker Yockey for the first time in New York. In June 1952, Weiss sheltered Yockey on his farm while he was fleeing the U.S. State Department's security services. Weiss helped finance the publication of Der Feind Europas, a book by Yockey published clandestinely in Germany in the fall of 1953. In 1955, according to notes from the anti-fascist organization Non-Sectarian Anti-Nazi League, Weiss reportedly helped organize Yockey's departure to the Eastern Bloc.

Weiss also maintained ties with several other figures in the American far right, including Conde McGinley of the newspaper Common Sense, Frank Britton of The American Nationalist, and Lyrl Van Hyning of the newspaper Women's Voice. Articles prepared by his German collaborators were regularly published in these media outlets before being republished in magazines such as Der Weg, presented as reports from the United States.

=== Relations with the European far right ===
In the 1950s, he also maintained close ties with German far-right circles. He provided monthly funding of 1,000 Deutsche Mark to the newspaper Der Reichsruf, which later became the official organ of the German Imperial Party. According to West German authorities, he corresponded after the war with several Nazi figures, notably Werner Naumann, Ernst Achenbach, and General Heinz Guderian.

His correspondents also included Einar Åberg, president of the Anti-Jewish Action League of Sweden; Arnold Leese, leader of the Imperial Fascist League; the Grand Mufti of Jerusalem; and the three former Nazis who founded the Sozialistische Reichspartei: Otto Ernst Remer, Hans-Ulrich Rudel, and Gerhard Krüger. During the 1950s, Weiss offered financial support to Rudel. According to the testimony of a double agent who provided information to the Non-Sectarian Anti-Nazi League while being a member of the National Renaissance Party, Weiss allegedly financed Rudel's return to West Germany so that he could participate in the 1953 federal election.

In the 1950s, Fred Weiss also collaborated with NATINFORM, a European nationalist group. He was asked financial support by Peter Huxley-Blythe, the editor-in-chief of NATINFORM's newsletter World Survey. Weiss and his associate H. Keith Thompson disseminated NATINFORM's propaganda, particularly their writings criticizing Otto John, then head of the Federal Office for the Protection of the Constitution.

== Ideological positions ==
In Quo Vadis, America (1946), Weiss defined postwar politics as a struggle between "Orient vs. Occident", or, to use Spenglerian terminology, "Magian vs. Faustian culture." He warned against a supposed "Magian Jewish consensus," which he described as "landless, timeless and boundless" and which supposedly aimed to create a "Classless, Stateless, World Chaos". In The Untouchables (1950) and Russia (1955–1956), he developed his theory on the struggle between Orient and Occident by distinguishing between a Western communism controlled by Jews (Trotskyism) and a Eurasian form of communism (Stalinism), which he considered to reflect the true soul of Russia.

In the 1950s, he published several articles in support of the Soviet Union, arguing that an alliance with the East would be more advantageous for Germany than one with the West. In Russia (1955–1956), he predicted the transformation of Joseph Stalin and Nikita Khrushchev's Bolshevik doctrine into an openly nationalist movement and portrayed the USSR as the principal enemy of the so-called "international Jewry". He then published The Great Question (1957), in which he portrayed the USSR as having resolved the "Jewish question" and commented on the launch of Sputnik, which he described as "a Russian sword of Damocles in the form of a satellite hanging over our heads (with no possibility of retaliation)"; he subsequently published Will He Bury Us? (1958), which continued his critique of far-right conspiracy theories regarding alleged Jewish control of the USSR. In these writings, he celebrated Soviet technological advances, predicting the transformation of Western Siberia and Turkestan into a "true climatic and vegetative paradise" capable of feeding an additional 150 million people.

In Germania delenda est? (1947), he criticized the Nazi racial theory of blood, arguing that the Thirty Years' War had so altered the "Nordic" genetic type that, by the time the United States entered the war, "the balance of 'pure' Nordic blood was certainly tilted against the Axis".
