= Frederick Weiss =

Frederick Weiss may refer to:

- Frederick Charles Weiss (1885–1968), German-American neo-Nazi activist
- Frederick Ernest Weiss (1865–1953), British botanist
- Frederick G. Weiss (born 1939), American scholar of Hegel

== See also ==
- Frédéric Weis, French basketball player
- Frederick Lewis Weis, American historian
