= Passow =

Passow may refer to:

== Places ==
- Passow, Brandenburg, a municipality in Brandenburg, Germany
- Passow, Mecklenburg-Vorpommern, a municipality in Mecklenburg-Vorpommern, Germany

== People with the surname ==
- Franz Passow (1786–1833), German classical scholar and lexicographer
