= Gallin-Kuppentin =

- Municipality
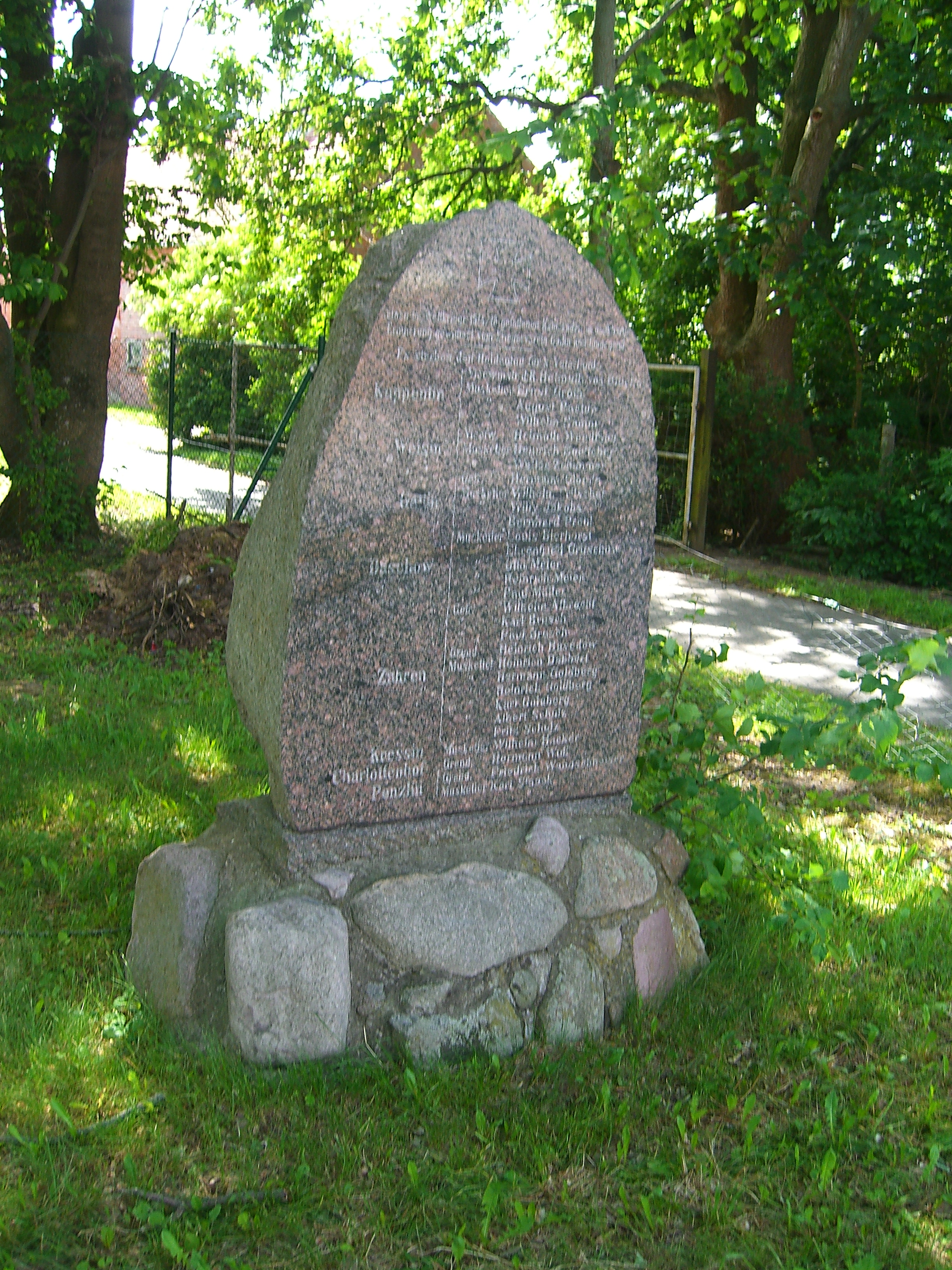
- World War I memorial in Gallin-Kuppentin

- Location of Gallin-Kuppentin within Ludwigslust-Parchim district
- Interactive map of Gallin-Kuppentin
- Location within Germany Location within Mecklenburg-Vorpommern
- Coordinates: 53°30′N 12°08′E
- Country: Germany
- State: Mecklenburg-Vorpommern
- District: Ludwigslust-Parchim
- Municipal assoc.: Eldenburg Lübz
- Subdivisions: 5 Ortsteile

Government
  - Mayor: Holger Klukas

Area
  - Total: 29.61 km^{2} (11.43 sq mi)
- Elevation: 60 m (200 ft)

Population (2025-12-31)
  - Total: 427
  - Density: 14.4/km^{2} (37.3/sq mi)
- Time zone: UTC+01:00 (CET)
  - Summer (DST): UTC+02:00 (CEST)
- Postal codes: 19386
- Dialling codes: 038732
- Vehicle registration: PCH
- Website: www.amt-eldenburg-luebz.de

Gallin-Kuppentin is a municipality in the Ludwigslust-Parchim district, in Mecklenburg-Vorpommern, Germany.
