= Eldenburg Lübz =

- Amt
- Map of Ludwigslust-Parchim highlighting Eldenburg Lübz
- Interactive map of Eldenburg Lübz
- Location within Germany Location within Mecklenburg-Vorpommern
- Coordinates: 53°24′N 12°01′E
- Country: Germany
- State: Mecklenburg-Vorpommern
- District: Ludwigslust-Parchim
- Seat: Lübz
- Subdivisions: 10 municipalities

Area
  - Total: 403.53 km^{2} (155.80 sq mi)

Population (2025-12-31)
  - Total: 11,513
  - Density: 28.531/km^{2} (73.894/sq mi)
- Time zone: UTC+01:00 (CET)
  - Summer (DST): UTC+02:00 (CEST)
- Website: www.amt-eldenburg-luebz.de

Eldenburg Lübz is an Amt in the Ludwigslust-Parchim district, in Mecklenburg-Vorpommern, Germany. The seat of the Amt is in Lübz.

The Amt Eldenburg Lübz consists of the following municipalities:

1. Gallin-Kuppentin
2. Gehlsbach
3. Granzin
4. Kreien
5. Kritzow
6. Lübz
7. Passow
8. Ruhner Berge
9. Siggelkow
10. Werder
