= Gehlsbach =

- Municipality
- Location of Gehlsbach within Ludwigslust-Parchim district
- Interactive map of Gehlsbach
- Location within Germany Location within Mecklenburg-Vorpommern
- Coordinates: 53°23′N 12°07′E
- Country: Germany
- State: Mecklenburg-Vorpommern
- District: Ludwigslust-Parchim
- Municipal assoc.: Eldenburg Lübz
- Subdivisions: 8

Area
  - Total: 33.19 km^{2} (12.81 sq mi)
- Elevation: 65 m (213 ft)

Population (2025-12-31)
  - Total: 514
  - Density: 15.5/km^{2} (40.1/sq mi)
- Time zone: UTC+01:00 (CET)
  - Summer (DST): UTC+02:00 (CEST)
- Postal codes: 19386
- Dialling codes: 038733
- Vehicle registration: PCH
- Website: Amt Eldenburg Lübz

Gehlsbach (German pronunciation: [ˈɡeːlsˌbax]) is a municipality in the Ludwigslust-Parchim district of Mecklenburg-Vorpommern, Germany. It was formed on 1 January 2014 by the merger of the former municipalities of Karbow-Vietlübbe and Wahlstorf.
