= Peyote Way Church of God, Inc. v. Thornburgh =

US court case denying general religious use of peyote

- Court: United States Court of Appeals for the Fifth Circuit
- Full case name: Peyote Way Church of God, Inc. v. Thornburgh
- Decided: February 6 1991
- Citation: 922 F.2d 1210

Holding
- Peyote Way's constitutional claims were dismissed.

Court membership
- Judges sitting: Charles Clark, Thomas Morrow Reavley, Carolyn Dineen King

Case opinions
- Majority: Reavley, joined by King
- Dissent: Clark

Laws applied
- Commerce Clause, Due Process Clause, Establishment Clause, Equal Protection Clause, Free Exercise Clause, Controlled Substances Act

Peyote Way Church of God, Inc. v. Thornburgh was a court case decided by the United States Court of Appeals for the Fifth Circuit in which the Peyote Way Church of God challenged an exemption in the Controlled Substances Act that permitted members of the Native American Church to use peyote in religious ceremonies while not giving the same exemption to members of other churches. The court ruled that the exemption was primarily a political rather than a religious one and that all of Peyote Way's claims were without merit.

== Background ==
The psychedelic drug peyote has been traditionally used by Native Americans. There have been various peyote-based belief systems, but one prominent one is that of the Native American Church, founded in 1918.

The Peyote Way Church of God was formed in 1977 by Immanuel Trujillo, a former member of the Native American Church who had left the group in 1966 because he objected to the church's requirement of being a Native American to be a member.

Peyote was first made illegal in the United States by the Drug Abuse Control Act Amendments of 1965 but a regulation was issued exempting religious use by the NAC. That exemption continued after the Controlled Substances Act passed in 1970 but continued to apply only to that church. Peyote Way sued in 1980, arguing that the exemption applying to the NAC but not them violated various constitutional rights of the church. The United States District Court for the Northern District of Texas ruled against them, and they appealed.

== Opinion ==
The majority opinion started by considering Peyote Way's claim under the Free Exercise Clause, which it considered precluded because of the Supreme Court's opinion in Employment Division v. Smith as the laws in question were generally applicable. It then looked at the claims of inequality with the Native American Church's peyote exemption. The court found that because the NAC limited membership only to those of Native American ancestry the exemption was for a political group and it was "rationally related to the legitimate governmental objective of preserving Native American culture". Hence there was no equal protection problem in only giving the exemption to the NAC. The same justification applied to Peyote Way's argument under the Establishment Clause. Finally the court cited Bowers v. Hardwick in refusing to recognize any new privacy right for Peyote Way to practice their religion.

The dissent argued that because the exemption was only for the Native American Church it must necessarily be a religious exemption rather than a political one, but would also have denied Peyote Way's claim for relief because the unconstitutionality of the NAC exemption would not give any rights to them.

== Legacy ==
The decision was criticized in the American Indian Law Review for relying on the NAC's official membership requirements instead of investigating if non-Native individuals were indeed using peyote under the church's umbrella. In 1994 Congress amended the American Indian Religious Freedom Act to legalize peyote use by all members of Indian tribes, making it clear that the granted exemption was to a political group rather than a religious one.

The Peyote Way Church of God still exists and offers "spirit walks" to the public in order for them to take peyote. The church no longer faces legal action. Trujillo died in 2010.

== See also ==
- Gonzales v. O Centro Espirita Beneficente Uniao do Vegetal
