= Kreien =

- Municipality
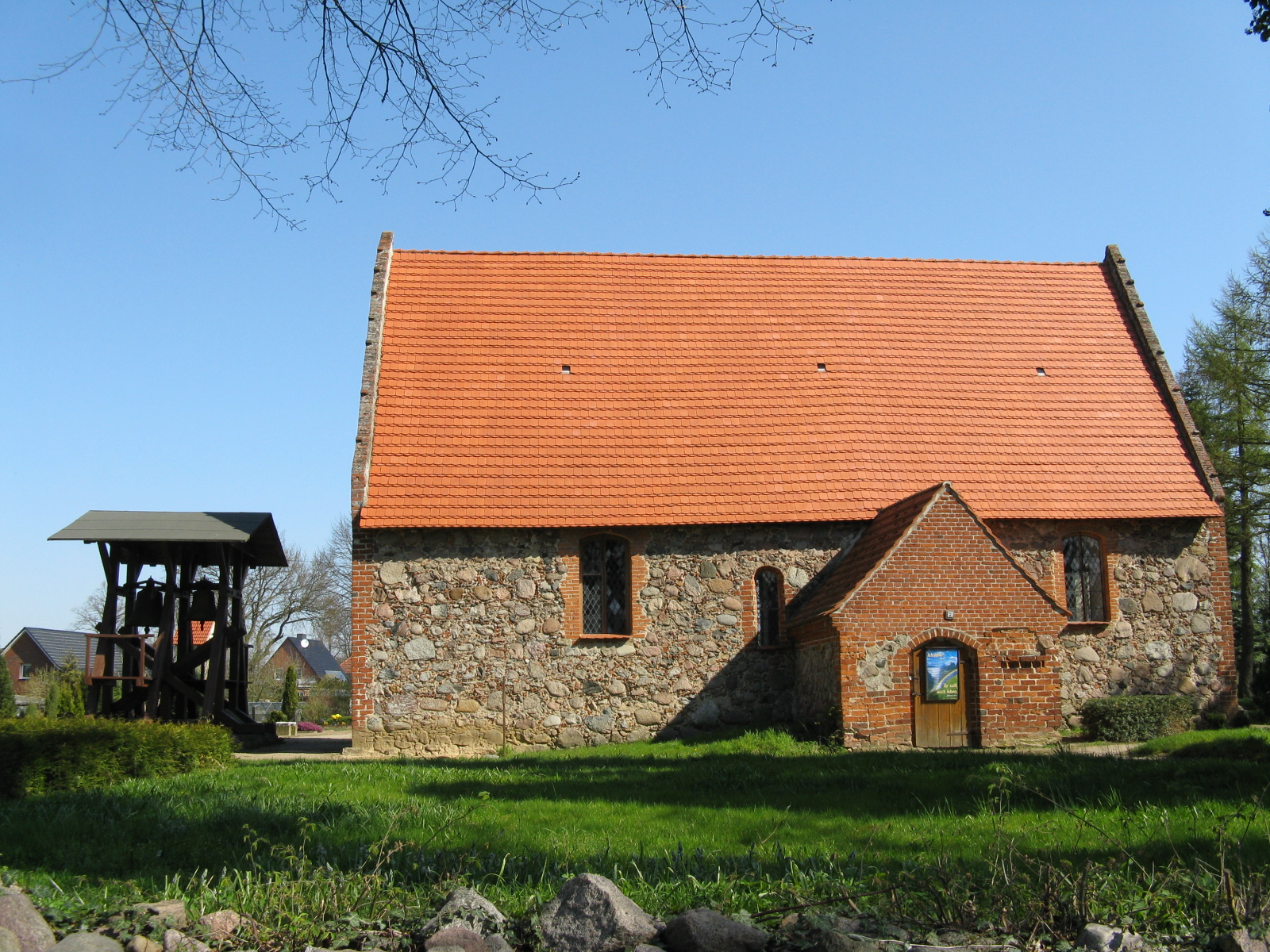
- Church

- Location of Kreien within Ludwigslust-Parchim district
- Interactive map of Kreien
- Location within Germany Location within Mecklenburg-Vorpommern
- Coordinates: 53°24′N 12°03′E
- Country: Germany
- State: Mecklenburg-Vorpommern
- District: Ludwigslust-Parchim
- Municipal assoc.: Eldenburg Lübz
- Subdivisions: 5

Government
  - Mayor: Birgit Lange

Area
  - Total: 24.9 km^{2} (9.6 sq mi)
- Elevation: 65 m (213 ft)

Population (2025-12-31)
  - Total: 360
  - Density: 14/km^{2} (37/sq mi)
- Time zone: UTC+01:00 (CET)
  - Summer (DST): UTC+02:00 (CEST)
- Postal codes: 19386
- Dialling codes: 038733
- Vehicle registration: PCH
- Website: www.amt-eldenburg-luebz.de

Kreien (German pronunciation: [ˈkʁaɪən]) is a municipality in the Ludwigslust-Parchim district, in Mecklenburg-Vorpommern, Germany.
