= Adler und Falke =

Nazi folkish youth organization

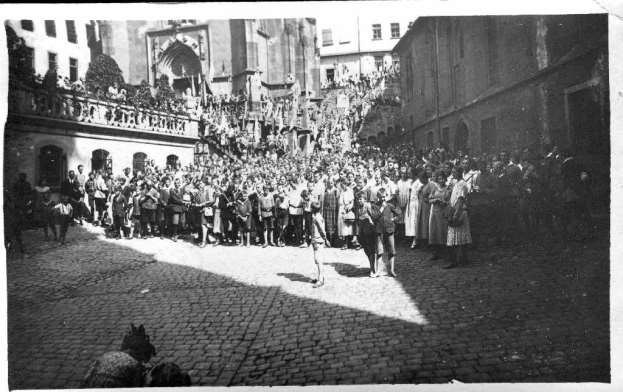
Adler und falken

The Adler und Falken, Deutsche Jugendwanderer e. V. (English: Eagles and Falcons, German Youth Hikers) was a Nazi folkish youth organization affiliated with the Wandervogel movement, founded in 1920 by Wilhelm Kotzde-Kottenrodt and with around 3,000 members in the German Reich, Austria and Bohemia in 1921. Following conflicts over the leadership of the association, the “Deutsche Falkenschaft," which had a similar focus, split in 1929. The two co-ed organizations were required to transfer all members under the age of 18 to the Hitler Youth in 1933 and dissolved themselves shortly afterwards.

== Goals ==
The aim of the Adler und Falken was the “renewal of the German people” on the basis of German culture and the avoidance of “alien influences” on the members. Boys and girls were grouped together in the organization, as its objectives were also to be achieved through the formation of “nationally-minded families”.

The Adler und Falken adopted many elements of the Jugendmusikbewegung (English: Youth Music Movement) for the cultural education of its members. Community theater groups were also intended to introduce outsiders to the ideas of the group. Publishing houses run by the Adler und Falken and the Deutsche Falkenschaft published numerous brochures about their ideas and the artists associated with them.

Overall, the Adler und Falken attached great importance to artistic education compared to other contemporary youth organizations. The experience of nature was sought on trips typical of the Wandervogel movement. “Germanness” was supposed to be experienced in both art and nature. In addition, the Adler und Falken were the first organization to establish a strict age division: up to the age of 17, members were referred to as Adler, after that as Falken. Actual membership ended at the age of 27 However, the members concerned were transferred to the Rolandsbund age organization.
