= Wahlstorf =

- Ortsteil of Gehlsbach
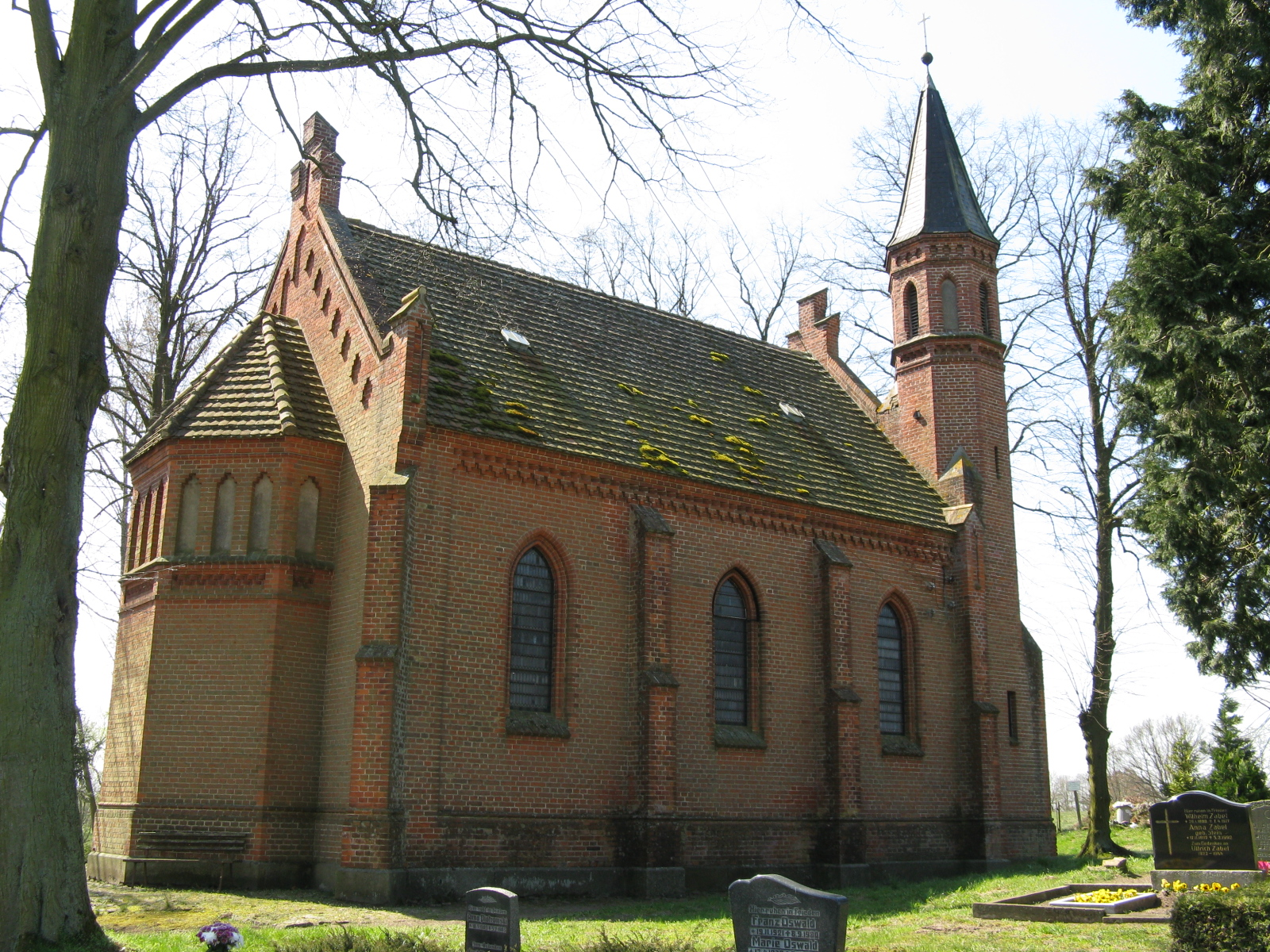
- Church
- Interactive map of Wahlstorf
- Location within Germany Location within Mecklenburg-Vorpommern
- Coordinates: 53°22′N 12°05′E
- Country: Germany
- State: Mecklenburg-Vorpommern
- District: Ludwigslust-Parchim
- Municipality: Gehlsbach

Area
  - Total: 12.46 km^{2} (4.81 sq mi)
- Elevation: 63 m (207 ft)

Population (2012-12-31)
  - Total: 153
  - Density: 12.3/km^{2} (31.8/sq mi)
- Time zone: UTC+01:00 (CET)
  - Summer (DST): UTC+02:00 (CEST)
- Postal codes: 19386
- Dialling codes: 038733
- Vehicle registration: PCH
- Website: Amt Eldenburg Lübz

Wahlstorf is a village and a former municipality in the Ludwigslust-Parchim district, in Mecklenburg-Vorpommern, Germany. Since 1 January 2014, it has been part of the municipality Gehlsbach.
