= Order of the Black Ram =

Neo-Nazi Satanist group

- A ram pentagram symbol used on the cover of their magazine
- Abbreviation: OBR
- Founded: 1973
- Founder: Seth Kliphoth
- Founded at: Michigan, U.S.
- Dissolved: 1976
- Headquarters: Southgate, Michigan, U.S.
- Main organ: Liber Venifica

The Order of the Black Ram (OBR; also called Ordo Caperorum Nigra, lit. 'Order of the Black Goat') was an American neo-Nazi-Satanist organization based in Southgate, Michigan in the 1970s. It was led by Seth Kliphoth, a member of the Church of Satan (CoS) and an organizer of the neo-Nazi National Renaissance Party (NRP). Most members of the OBR were also members of the NRP. It was affiliated with the group Shrine of the Little Mother, which expressed similar beliefs.

An offshoot of the Church of Satan, it published a periodical, Liber Venifica. In addition to its neo-Nazi ideology, it was ideologically influenced by Church of Satan founder Anton LaVey, neopaganism, and science fiction writer Robert A. Heinlein. It only lasted a few years and soon faded into obscurity. It has been described by scholars as one of the first neo-Nazi Satanist groups, which later became a larger current among neo-Nazis.

== Background ==
A split from the Church of Satan (CoS), an American Satanist organization founded by Anton LaVey in the 1960s, the Order of the Black Ram was founded by former members of the National Renaissance Party (NRP); the NRP was an American neo-Nazi organization led by James H. Madole. Madole had a close relationship with LaVey and had met him on a number of occasions. Madole rejected Christianity and was one of the earliest white supremacists to embrace occultism and Satanism. Shortly after the Church of Satan was formed, he began corresponding with LaVey. Historian Jeffrey Kaplan wrote that the Order's existence "may be traced to Madole's early influence".

== History ==
=== Founding ===
Kliphoth, the founder of the Order of the Black Ram, in 1980 (center)

The OBR was founded in 1973 as a schism from the Church of Satan, alongside the Shrine of the Little Mother, a related group. It was led by Seth Kliphoth, which is a pseudonym. (Note: Sometimes hyphenated as Seth-Kliphoth. Some sources spell it Seth-Klippoth.) Kliphoth was the grand magister of the group and styled himself as "Reverend". (Note: Douglas Robbins, another Church of Satan member, is also described as the founder by some writers. Robbins being the founder is claimed by Goodrick-Clarke and Introvigne, citing Goodrick-Clarke. Introvigne does not mention the pseudonym Seth-Kliphoth, while Goodrick-Clarke separately describes Robbins and Kliphoth as the founder. Robbins was the former leader of the Belphegor Grotto of the Church of Satan.) He also used the name Seth Typhon, (Note: Sometimes written with a hyphen. Satanist and journalist Gavin Baddeley claimed that Seth-Typhon and Seth-Kliphoth were actually separate people with different identities, with Seth-Kliphoth (Grumbowski) being the founder of the Order of the Black Ram and Seth-Typhon (Amend) founding the Shrine of the Little Mother. However, most other writers identify Seth-Typhon and Seth-Kliphoth as the same person, and in 1981, a writer naming himself as "Seth K. Typhon" wrote a letter to the New Jersey newspaper The Courier-News, identifying himself as the Magister of the Order of the Black Ram. The book The New Satanists by ex-Temple of Set member Linda Blood, which attempts to expose Satanism as a "cult", claims that Seth-Kliphoth was Grubowski and that Amend had founded the Shrine of the Little Mother.) though his real name was John T. Amend. The Seth in his name was probably meant to refer to the Egyptian god Set. Kliphoth was the Michigan organizer for the National Renaissance Party, and a former member of the Church of Satan. Kliphoth, born 1951 or 1952, was raised Presbyterian, and worked as a Taxi driver. He was previously a member of Wayne West's schism from the CoS in 1972, the New Occultic Church of Vision, after West dissolved his Babylon Grotto; he edited West's Vision newsletter.

He also had contacts with the Odinist Movement of Canada, and was also known for sacrificing chickens during his satanic rituals, something forbidden by the Church of Satan. The OBR may have been cofounded by Amend and Michael Grumbowski, as was the Shrine. (Note: Grumbowski is identified by some sources as Seth-Kliphoth. Sunshine says that Grumbowski joined the Order in 1974, a year after it was founded.) Grumbowski was also known as "Reverend Blackshire" and "Shai", a third-degree priest in the CoS and formerly the leader of the CoS's Phoenix Grotto in Detroit. Both Grumbowski and Kliphoth were close associates of Madole and were later members of the Temple of Set.

=== Activities ===
Cover of the ninth issue of their magazine, Liber Venifica

The Order of the Black Ram counted as members Kliphoth and several members of the NRP. Madole used the OBR to recruit CoS members into the NRP and OBR. It was headquartered in Southgate, Michigan, where Kliphoth lived. They published the periodical Liber Venifica. It was published irregularly. This was later combined with the newsletter Grimorium Verum, previously operated by the Satanist group Ordo Templi Satanas. In 1974, Grumbowski stepped down from the Temple of Set to join the Order of the Black Ram. He later returned to the Temple of Set in December of that year.

After creating the group, Kliphoth resigned from the CoS. Shortly after, he brought the OBR members to a Toronto Odinist gathering in 1974, which included representatives of white supremacist parties. Once LaVey was informed of the OBR, there emerged conflicts between it and the CoS; LaVey contacted Michael A. Aquino and discussed how to deal with the new group. They were initially regarded as a fraternal group to the Church of Satan. Aquino and LaVey attempted to distance themselves from open neo-Nazism, while still attempting to collaborate with the NRP. As a result of the OBR's existence and attempted recruitment of CoS members, the CoS took an official stance on Nazism, seeking to at least officially distance itself from open Nazism.

=== Dissolution ===
The group became defunct by about 1976. The Shrine ceased activity at about the same time. By 1977, Kliphoth was the Detroit leader of the neo-Nazi National Socialist Liberation Front. By 1980, he was a grand dragon of the Michigan White Knights of the Ku Klux Klan, an independent group of the Ku Klux Klan which had no ties to its national organization. He was affiliated with fellow Klansman Robert E. Miles, who described him as a "former devil worshipper"; journalist Daniel Gearino described Kliphoth as "a fringe figure even by Klan standards". Grumbowski became a magister of the Temple of Set and was a member of their Order of the Trapezoid sub-group.

== Ideology ==
A symbol that appeared on the Order of the Black Ram's magazine, Liber Venifica; it features a pentagram overlayed on a sun cross

The Order of the Black Ram was also known as Ordo Caperorum Nigra, Latin for 'Order of the Black Goat'. It was a Satanist organization, incorporating an eclectic mix of influences, heavily involving neo-Nazism. It maintained close ties with the National Renaissance Party throughout its existence. Most members of the OBR were also members of the NRP.

It believed each race had a "racial soul" as expressed by its culture and philosophy, and took an esoteric racialist approach, focusing on "Aryan" racial supremacy. Its goal was described as "celebrat[ing] the ancient religious rites of the Aryan race" and to "revive the Sacred Rites of our Aryan forefathers". It placed a high value on individualism, influenced by LaVey's ideas as expressed in The Satanic Bible and by neopaganism. It incorporated Nazi racial ideas and the ideas of Adolf Hitler, as well as those of anthropologist Carlos Castaneda, and claimed psychic Jane Roberts. Its materials portrayed whites as a superior "Satanic Race", the originators of great civilizations and Atlantis, opposed by those in the "present world". It also based its ideology on the works of science fiction writer Robert A. Heinlein, particularly his 1961 novel Stranger in a Strange Land. It listed as recommended reading Mein Kampf, The Morning of the Magicians, and Ben Klassen's Nature's Eternal Religion. It promoted the National Renaissance Bulletin, the periodical of the NRP, and discussed exchanges with other white supremacist periodicals. This included The Odinist and the gay-neo-Nazi publication NS Mobilizer.

Despite its far-right ties and explicit racist ideology, in its official history, it did not mention its racism or its tie to Madole and the NRP, instead portraying itself as a split from the Church of Satan. It was affiliated with the Shrine of the Little Mother, which expressed similar ideas. Scholar Chris Mathews argued it represented a "thorough synthesis of Satanism and neo-Nazism", while scholar Damon T. Berry described it as a white nationalist organization. Arthur Lyons described its beliefs as "a hodgepodge of Satanism, paganism, astral projection, geomancy, and the cult of the Little Mother". The Shrine, its closely associated sister organization, departed from Church of Satan doctrine in its ritual sacrifice of live chickens, which violated CoS doctrine. Both had neo-Nazi elements to their ideologies.

== Legacy ==
After its dissolution, it fell into obscurity. It has been described by scholars as one of the first neo-Nazi Satanist groups; combining neo-Nazism with Satanism later became a larger current among neo-Nazis. It emerged at about the same time as the Order of Nine Angles, another neo-Nazi Satanist group in the United Kingdom. Spencer Sunshine described it as a "harbinger of things to come".

Nicholas Goodrick-Clarke wrote that the contacts between Madole and Satanism, as well as the founding of the Order of the Black Ram, "anticipated the pagan alliances of neo-Nazis and satanists in the 1990s". Its existence also led the CoS to take an official stance on Nazism. Writing retrospectively on the group, journalist and Satanist Gavin Baddeley considered it to be an example of when "1970s defectors from the Church of Satan tried to liven up their secondhand LaVeyism with Nazi regalia."

== See also ==
- Dark Lily
