= H. Keith Thompson =

American businessman and far-right figure (1922–2002)

Harold Keith Thompson
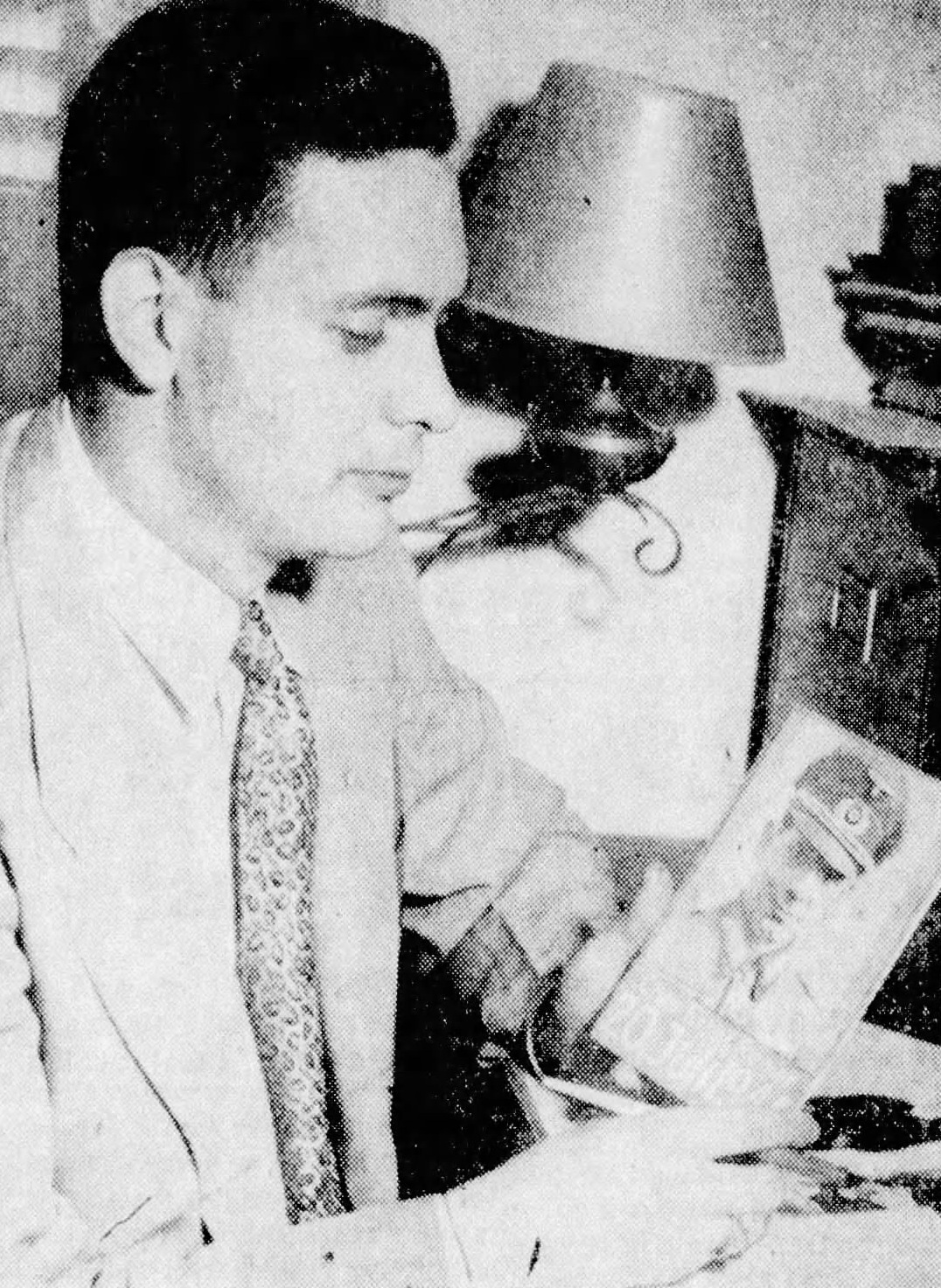
- Thompson in 1952
- Born: September 17, 1922; New Jersey, US
- Died: March 3, 2002 (aged 79)
- Education: Yale University
- Political party: National Renaissance Party; Republican Party

Harold Keith Thompson (September 17, 1922 – March 3, 2002) was a New York City-based corporate executive, a Nazi agent, and a figure within American far-right and fascist circles.

== Biography ==
Thompson was born in New Jersey in 1922.

=== Nazi activism ===
Thompson began his political activism in his teenage years, joining the German American Bund and the America First Committee, and campaigning against involvement before America's entry into World War II. He came to the attention of Nazi Germany and was appointed as a Special Agent of the Sicherheitsdienst (SD) Overseas Intelligence Unit on July 27, 1941, swearing a loyalty oath to Adolf Hitler. Thompson served in the U.S. Navy during the war.

=== Postwar ===
Thompson graduated from Yale University in 1946. He made an expedition to Antarctica as part of Operation Highjump under Rear Admiral Richard Evelyn Byrd. In 1948, Thompson joined the United States Marine Corps. In 1949, he was court-martialed for sexual deviation and maltreatment. Following a conviction and the approval of the verdict, Thompson, who had already been under investigation for his Neo-Nazi activities, was dismissed from the military.

Alongside his political activities, Thompson found work in public relations and owned a PR firm by the 1950s.

The writer Stephen E. Atkins describes Thompson as "the intermediary between American prewar Nazism and the postwar neo-Nazism". Thompson befriended the German Nazi Otto Skorzeny, who had been Hitler's commando leader, and worked with him to set up ODESSA. Thompson also became a close ally of Otto Ernst Remer, a Nazi general who had defended Hitler against a 1944 coup plot, and in 1951, Thompson registered with the United States Department of Justice as the American representative for the German neo-Nazi Socialist Reich Party co-founded by Remer, a position Thompson held until the group was banned in 1952. Around the same time, he became involved with the National Renaissance Party, the American neo-Nazi party founded by James Madole. Thompson campaigned with Francis Parker Yockey for Remer's release from prison during the 1950s. Thompson and Yockey remained close allies until the latter's suicide in federal custody in 1960. Thompson also ran a campaign to release Karl Dönitz, Hitler's successor. Thompson worked with neo-Nazi presses in South America to distribute literature covertly in Germany.

Among the stranger aspects of Thompson's life he was friends with the Jewish Communist publisher, Lyle Stuart, who he used the assistance of on several occasions to attack people with whom he had come into conflict including King Farouk of Egypt, and maintained warm relations with many members of the CPUSA.

In his article "I Am an American Fascist" for the obscure Exposé magazine in 1954, Thompson praised the Third Reich and Hitler and condemned the Nuremberg Trials as "vicious and vilely dishonorable". He became linked to the International Association for the Advancement of Ethnology and Eugenics and published a number of pamphlets on its behalf.

Thompson visited Cairo in an attempt to forge links to the Nasser regime. More concrete links were established with Mohammad Amin al-Husayni and Johann von Leers as part of efforts to build the ties of the extreme right in the West and the Islamic world.

=== Republican Party and later work ===
Along with a number of right wing activists Thompson was also involved on the fringes of the Republican Party. Independently wealthy, he contributed to the campaigns of such right wing figures in the GOP as Jesse Helms, Oliver North and Pat Buchanan. His monetary contributions to the party were such that he was awarded membership of its Presidential Legion of Merit as a result.

He became a mentor and friend to the Holocaust denier Keith Stimely.

In his later years, Thompson largely disappeared from public view. In the wake of the Oklahoma City bombing he re-emerged, initially welcoming the attack; afterward, however, he later revised his position and denounced it as a government act designed to destroy the reputation of the far right.

He would also speak positively about the Russian nationalist politician Vladimir Zhirinovsky saying that, "Zhironovky certainly seems a good man to me in many ways, certainly better than Yeltsin".

Thompson died in 2002.

== Writing ==
In the early post-war years, Thompson worked as a publisher and literary agent (his clients included Fulgencio Batista, Carol II of Romania and Hans-Ulrich Rudel). Thompson was offered a position on the board of policy of the Liberty Lobby, although he turned it down, stating that he only wanted to take one loyalty oath in his life (to Hitler when he joined the SD).
