= Kritzow =

- Municipality
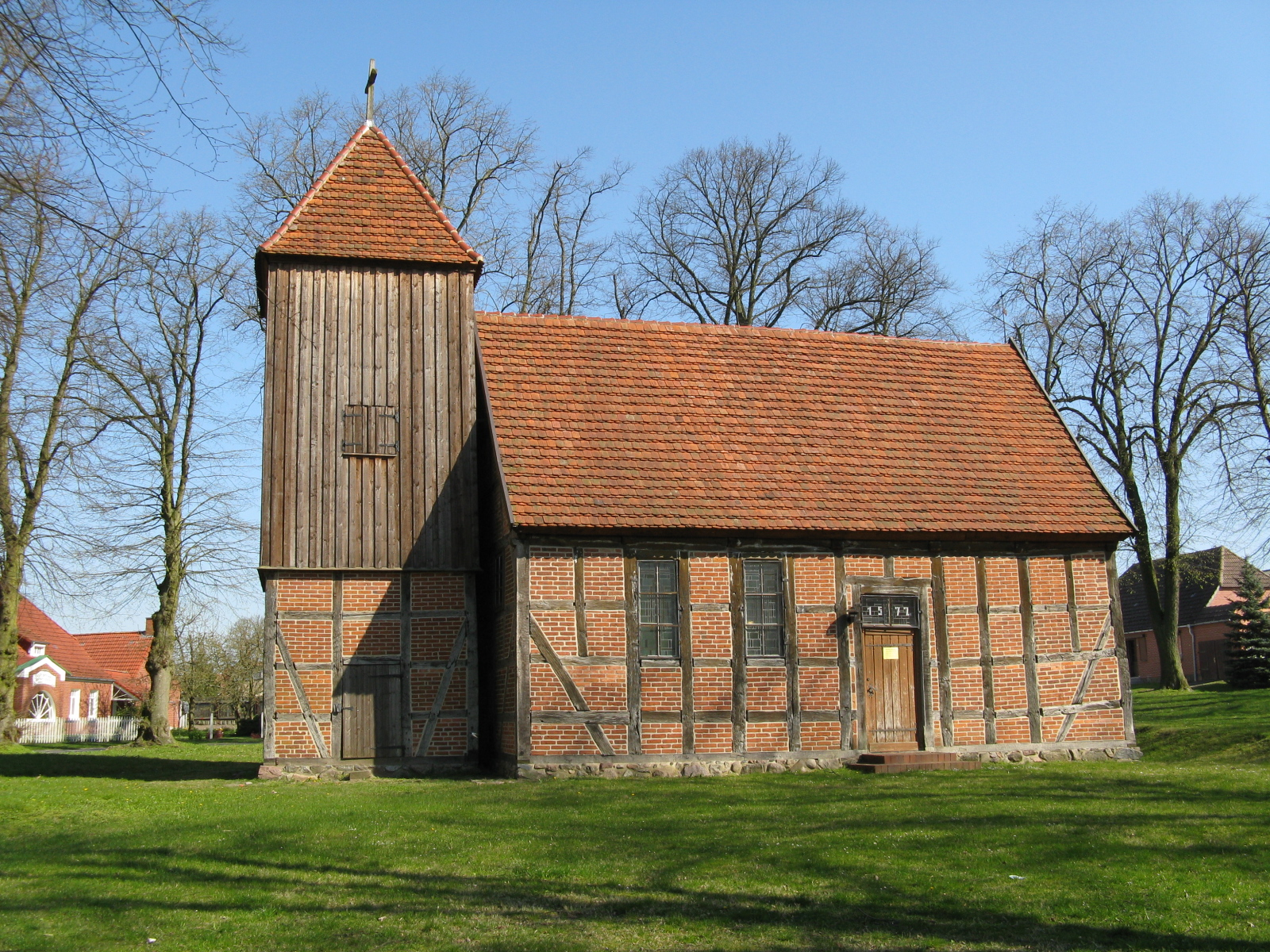
- Church

- Location of Kritzow within Ludwigslust-Parchim district
- Interactive map of Kritzow
- Location within Germany Location within Mecklenburg-Vorpommern
- Coordinates: 53°27′N 12°08′E
- Country: Germany
- State: Mecklenburg-Vorpommern
- District: Ludwigslust-Parchim
- Municipal assoc.: Eldenburg Lübz
- Subdivisions: 3

Government
  - Mayor: Eberhard Korf

Area
  - Total: 25.13 km^{2} (9.70 sq mi)
- Elevation: 62 m (203 ft)

Population (2025-12-31)
  - Total: 454
  - Density: 18.1/km^{2} (46.8/sq mi)
- Time zone: UTC+01:00 (CET)
  - Summer (DST): UTC+02:00 (CEST)
- Postal codes: 19386
- Dialling codes: 038731
- Vehicle registration: PCH
- Website: www.amt-eldenburg-luebz.de

Kritzow (German pronunciation: [ˈkʁɪtsoː]) is a municipality in the Ludwigslust-Parchim district, in Mecklenburg-Vorpommern, Germany.
