= Granzin =

- Municipality
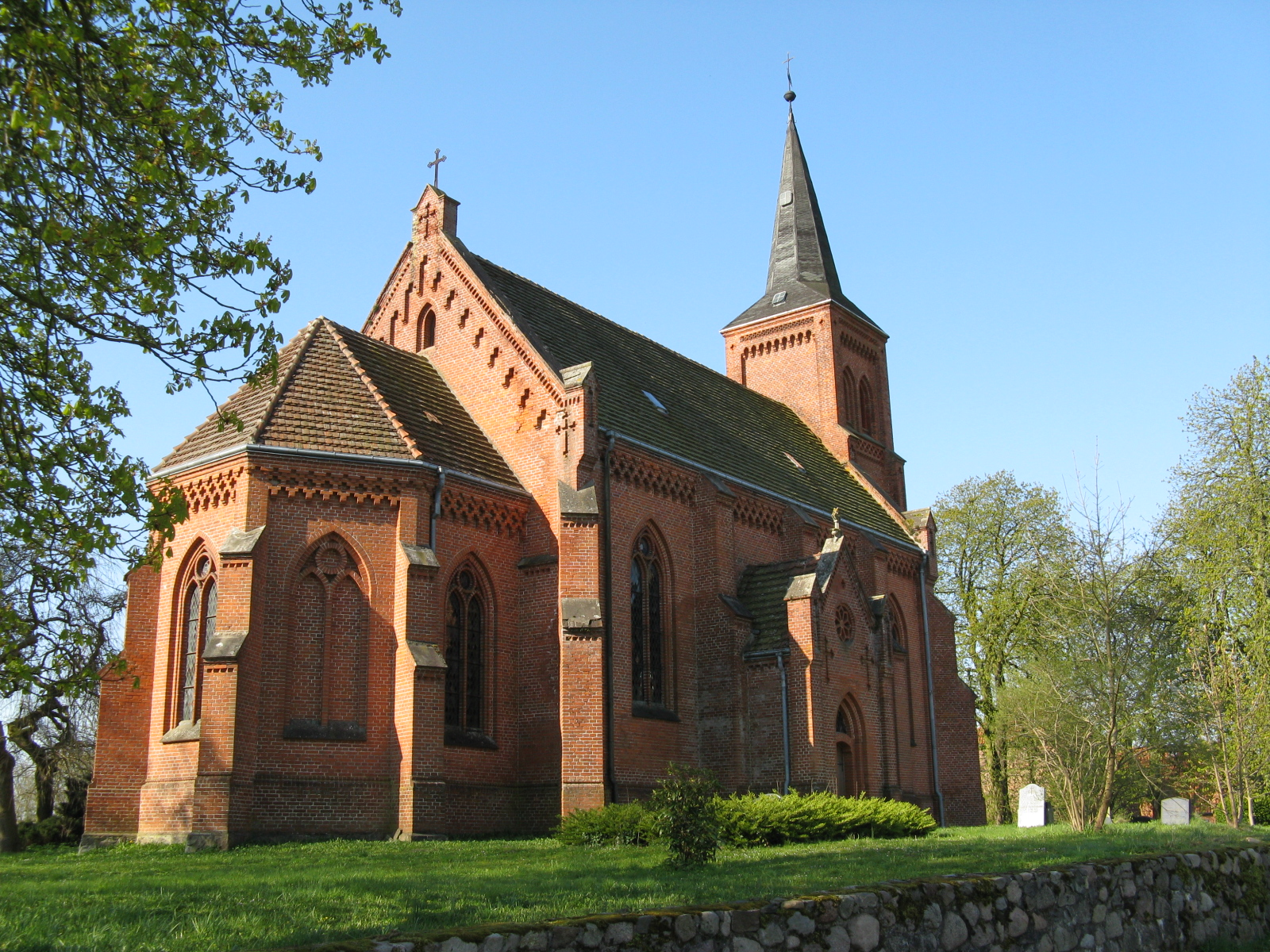
- Church

- Location of Granzin within Ludwigslust-Parchim district
- Interactive map of Granzin
- Location within Germany Location within Mecklenburg-Vorpommern
- Coordinates: 53°30′N 11°56′E
- Country: Germany
- State: Mecklenburg-Vorpommern
- District: Ludwigslust-Parchim
- Municipal assoc.: Eldenburg Lübz
- Subdivisions: 5 Ortsteile

Government
  - Mayor: Annemarie Göhler

Area
  - Total: 22.91 km^{2} (8.85 sq mi)
- Elevation: 65 m (213 ft)

Population (2025-12-31)
  - Total: 368
  - Density: 16.1/km^{2} (41.6/sq mi)
- Time zone: UTC+01:00 (CET)
  - Summer (DST): UTC+02:00 (CEST)
- Postal codes: 19386
- Dialling codes: 038720
- Vehicle registration: PCH
- Website: www.amt-eldenburg-luebz.de

Granzin is a municipality in the Ludwigslust-Parchim district, in Mecklenburg-Vorpommern, Germany.
