= Karbow-Vietlübbe =

- Ortsteil of Gehlsbach
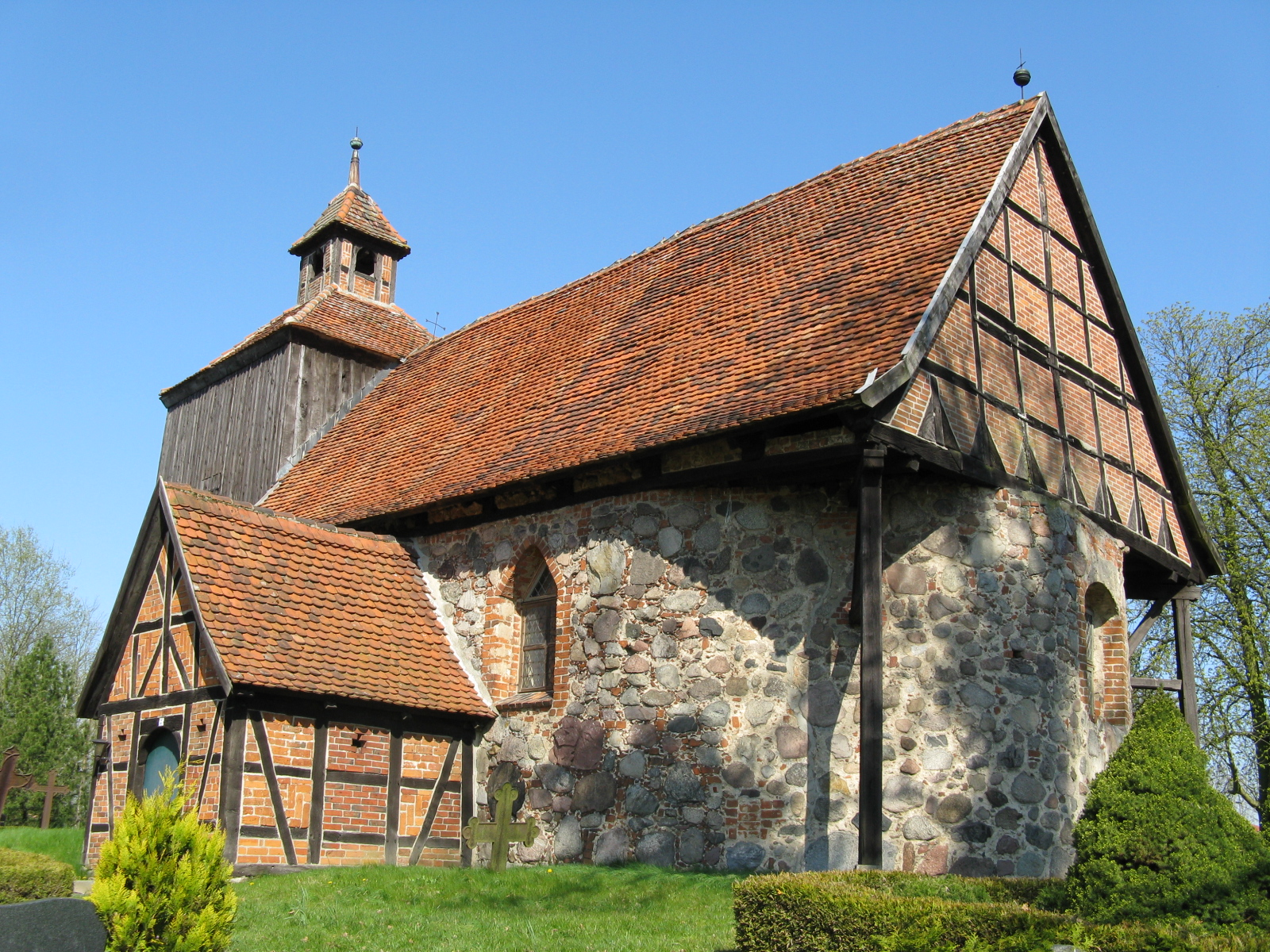
- Church in Karbow
- Interactive map of Karbow-Vietlübbe
- Location within Germany Location within Mecklenburg-Vorpommern
- Coordinates: 53°24′N 12°07′E
- Country: Germany
- State: Mecklenburg-Vorpommern
- District: Ludwigslust-Parchim
- Municipality: Gehlsbach

Area
  - Total: 20.66 km^{2} (7.98 sq mi)
- Elevation: 66 m (217 ft)

Population (2012-12-31)
  - Total: 342
  - Density: 16.6/km^{2} (42.9/sq mi)
- Time zone: UTC+01:00 (CET)
  - Summer (DST): UTC+02:00 (CEST)
- Postal codes: 19386
- Dialling codes: 038733
- Vehicle registration: PCH

Karbow-Vietlübbe (German pronunciation: [ˈkaʁboː ˈfiːtlʏbə]) is a former municipality in the Ludwigslust-Parchim district, in Mecklenburg-Vorpommern, in north-eastern Germany. Since 1 January 2014, it is part of the municipality Gehlsbach.

== History ==
During the final stages of World War II, on 4 March 1945, Karbow was the site of a stopover during the German-organised march of Polish prisoners of war from the Oflag II-D camp to the Stalag X-B camp.

== Notable people ==
- Johann von Leers (1902-1965), German writer
