= Non-Sectarian Anti-Nazi League =

American anti-Nazi organization

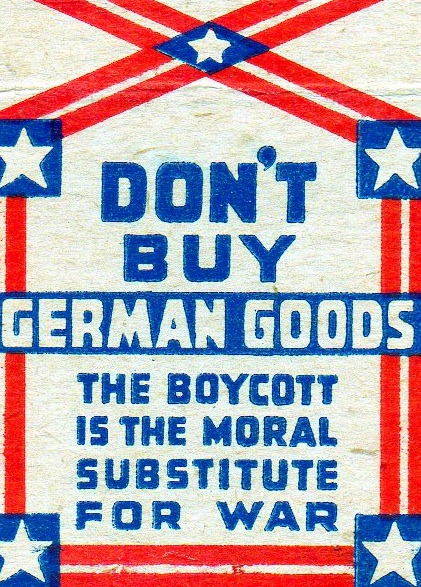
A matchbook cover issued by the Non-Sectarian Anti-Nazi League to advertise the anti-Nazi boycott

The Non-Sectarian Anti-Nazi League to Champion Human Rights (originally the American League for the Defense of Jewish Rights) was an American anti-Nazi and anti-fascist organization founded in 1933 by Samuel Untermyer to promote an economic boycott against Nazi Germany.

== Founding ==
A champion for Jewish rights, Samuel Untermyer was among the most outspoken critics of the Hitler regime, advocating an international boycott of Germany through the League of Nations. He led the league until his retirement in 1938, remaining involved in its activities until his death in 1940. Throughout the 1930s, allied with groups such as the American Federation of Labor, the league tried to persuade American businesses to stop purchasing merchandise from Germany, exposing the ones that continued selling Nazi-made goods in their bulletin. They also tried to stop Americans from visiting Germany, thereby stopping any money from coming in. Among its many boycotts were ones against the 1936 Olympics in Berlin and the Schmeling – Louis boxing match in 1938. They also lobbied the United States government, asking it to investigate various things, including pro-Nazi propaganda activities in the U.S. by organizations such as Welt-Dienst/World Service founded by Ulrich Fleischhauer. The League also tried to educate the public through talks on radio and by distributing printed material. It also provided information to Martin Dies and his House Un-American Activities Committee.

== James Sheldon Era ==
The League, under the new leadership of James H. Sheldon, a former professor at Boston University, changed its mission to directly investigate right-wing propaganda groups. Among them were the Christian Front of Father Coughlin, the Christian Mobilizers of Joseph McWilliams and the America First Party of Gerald L. K. Smith. They had also begun to support the civil rights movement voicing their approval for the Fair Employment Practice Commission (FEPC) and various other anti-discrimination laws. In 1945 it filed a lawsuit against Columbia University to have its tax-exempt status revoked for discrimination against Jews. After World War II the League also unsuccessfully tried to have the Nuremberg court prosecute the Grand Mufti of Jerusalem for having aided Hitler during the war.

The League was able to successfully combat the resurgence of hate groups in the U.S. by infiltrating the Ku Klux Klan. It was also instrumental in shutting down the Columbians, Inc., a neo-Nazi group based in Atlanta, Georgia, by hiring Stetson Kennedy to infiltrate the group. The league continued its investigation and exposure activities through the 1950s, providing the FBI with intelligence about such right-wing and neo-Nazi groups as the National Renaissance Party. Through the 1960s and the first half of the 1970s, the league continued to maintain an office on 46th street in New York City, but it served mostly as a repository, with information flowing in but minimal action being taken. The League terminated in 1975 with the death of its head, James H. Sheldon.

== Archives ==
Shortly after Sheldon's death, the archives of the League were entrusted to the Columbia University Libraries Rare Books and Manuscripts Division where they are, today, accessible to scholars and researchers.
