= Werder, Parchim =

Werder
- Municipality
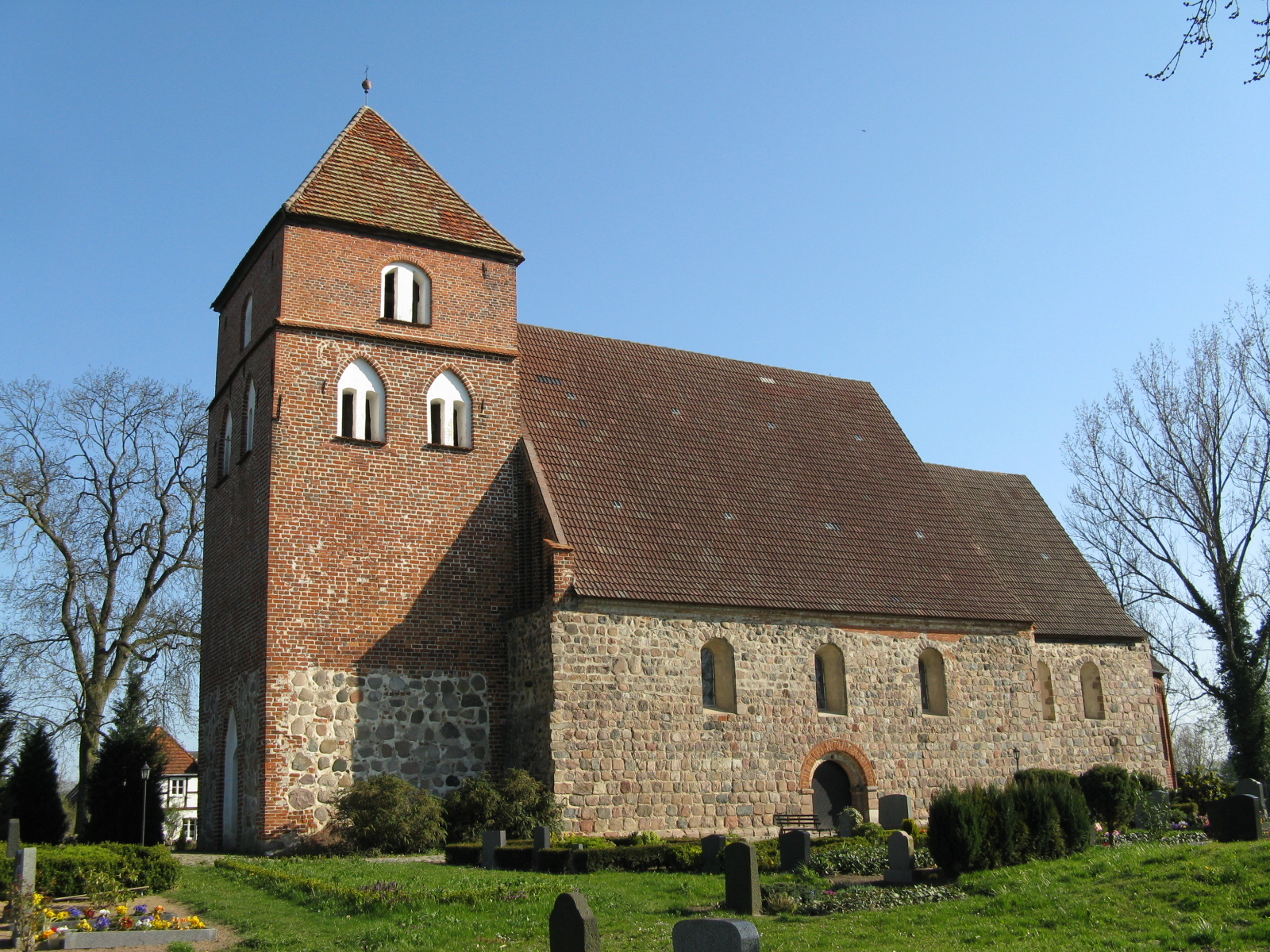
- Church in Benthen

- Location of Werder within Ludwigslust-Parchim district
- Interactive map of Werder
- Location within Germany Location within Mecklenburg-Vorpommern
- Coordinates: 53°30′N 12°01′E
- Country: Germany
- State: Mecklenburg-Vorpommern
- District: Ludwigslust-Parchim
- Municipal assoc.: Eldenburg Lübz
- Subdivisions: 4

Government
  - Mayor: Berno Schmalfeldt

Area
  - Total: 18.17 km^{2} (7.02 sq mi)
- Elevation: 63 m (207 ft)

Population (2025-12-31)
  - Total: 303
  - Density: 16.7/km^{2} (43.2/sq mi)
- Time zone: UTC+01:00 (CET)
  - Summer (DST): UTC+02:00 (CEST)
- Postal codes: 19386
- Dialling codes: 038731
- Vehicle registration: PCH
- Website: www.amt-eldenburg-luebz.de

Werder (German pronunciation: [ˈvɛʁdɐ]) is a municipality in the Ludwigslust-Parchim district, in Mecklenburg-Vorpommern, Germany.
