= Eberhard Fritsch =

Argentinian pro-Nazi magazine editor/publisher

Eberhard Ludwig Cäsar Fritsch (born 21 November 1921 in Buenos Aires, Argentina; died 25 November 1974 in Salzburg, Austria) was the editor and publisher of the pro-Nazi monthly magazine in Argentina Der Weg (The Way) (founded 1947) which advocated a revival of Nazism in Germany after the Second World War. He was a confidant of Adolf Eichmann in Argentina before Eichmann's capture and transfer for trial to Israel. With Willem Sassen he taped Eichmann's reminiscences with a view to publishing his memoirs. The memoirs were never published but the tapes were later used at Eichmann's trial.
