= Passow, Mecklenburg-Vorpommern =

Passow
- Municipality
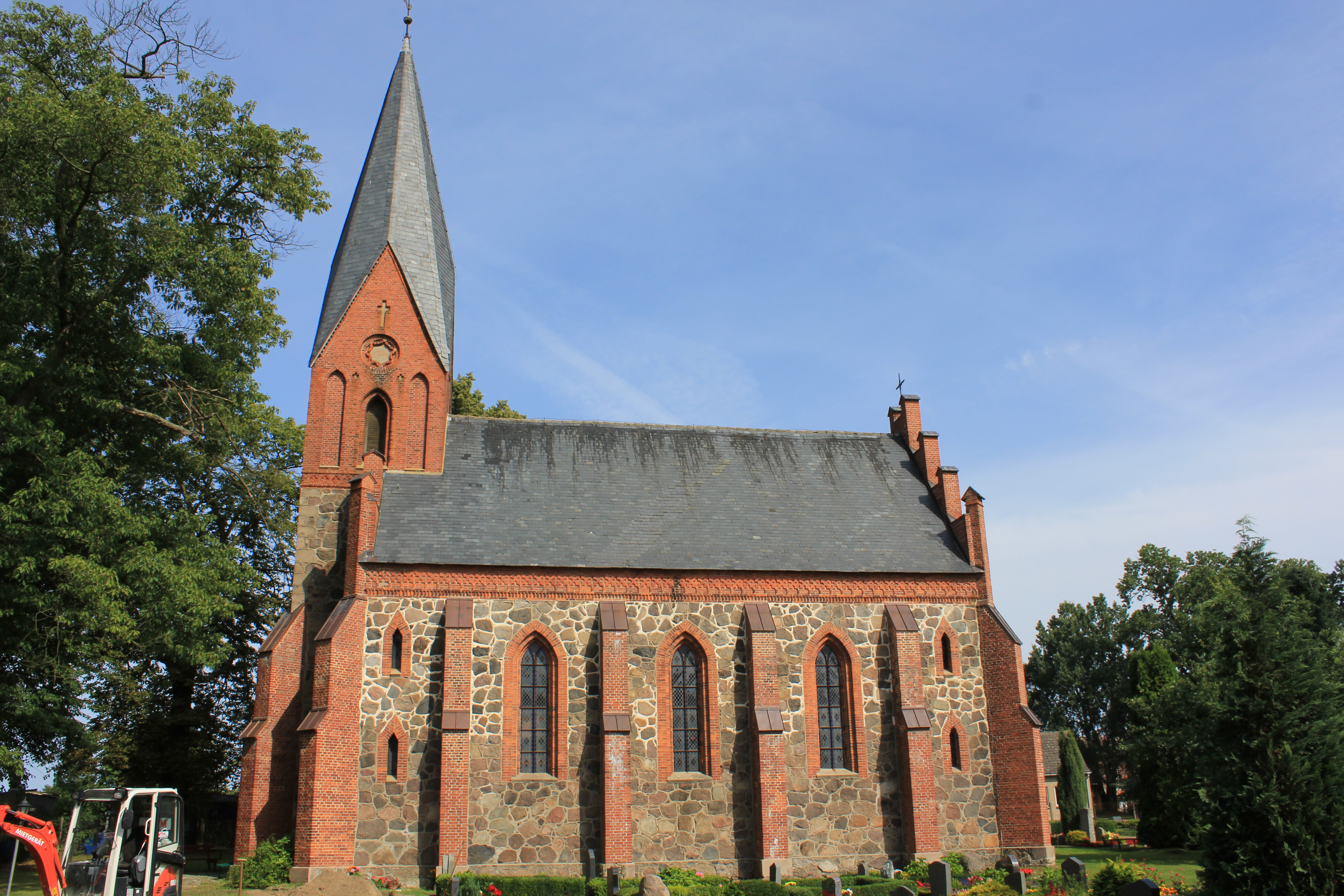
- Church in Passow

- Location of Passow within Ludwigslust-Parchim district
- Interactive map of Passow
- Location within Germany Location within Mecklenburg-Vorpommern
- Coordinates: 53°30′N 12°03′E
- Country: Germany
- State: Mecklenburg-Vorpommern
- District: Ludwigslust-Parchim
- Municipal assoc.: Eldenburg Lübz
- Subdivisions: 7

Government
  - Mayor: Dietmar Felski

Area
  - Total: 24.81 km^{2} (9.58 sq mi)
- Elevation: 60 m (200 ft)

Population (2025-12-31)
  - Total: 678
  - Density: 27.3/km^{2} (70.8/sq mi)
- Time zone: UTC+01:00 (CET)
  - Summer (DST): UTC+02:00 (CEST)
- Postal codes: 19386
- Dialling codes: 038731
- Vehicle registration: PCH
- Website: www.amt-eldenburg-luebz.de

Passow (German pronunciation: [ˈpasoː]) is a municipality in the Ludwigslust-Parchim district, in Mecklenburg-Vorpommern, Germany.
