= Der Weg (magazine) =

Political magazine in Argentina (1947–1957

- Editor: Eberhard Fritsch
- Categories: Political magazine
- Frequency: Monthly
- Publisher: Dürer Verlag
- Founded: 1947
- Final issue: 1957
- Country: Argentina
- Based in: Buenos Aires
- Language: German

Der Weg (German: The Way) was a far right monthly magazine which was published in Buenos Aires, Argentina, in the period 1947–1957. Its subtitle was Monatshefte zur Kulturpflege und zum Aufbau (German: Monthly Bulletin for Cultivation and Building Up).

== History and profile ==
Der Weg was launched in Buenos Aires as a monthly magazine in 1947. The founding publishing company was Dürer Verlag which was owned by Eberhard Fritsch who also edited Der Weg. Over time it became a radical right-wing magazine and functioned as a forum for the advocates of Neo-Nazi, fascist and conservative philosophies. Their goal was to revive Nazism. The contributors of the magazine which enjoyed the privileges granted by Argentine President Juan Perón included well-known far right figures who were either former Nazi officials or were from other countries such as Per Engdahl, Helmut Sündermann, Johann von Leers, Hans-Ulrich Rudel, Peter Kleist, Anton Zischka, Hans Fritzsche, Hans W. Hagen and Maurice Bardèche. The magazine also featured messages of Haj Amin al-Husseini, Grand Mufti of Jerusalem, and was the major media outlet for holocaust deniers.

There were many correspondents of Der Weg which at its peak, had an international circulation of 25,000 copies. It was distributed not only in South America, but also in Germany and Austria where it reached former Nazis. The magazine went bankrupt and folded in 1957. One of the reasons for its shutdown was the end of Juan Perón's presidency in 1955.
