= Jugendbund =

The Jugendbund der NSDAP was a youth organisation attached to the Nazi Party and a predecessor to the Hitler Youth. It was effectively the youth section of the Sturmabteilung (SA, or Storm Troopers) and it existed between 1922 (Note: Its formation was announced in the 8 March 1922 edition of the Völkischer Beobachter) and 1923 when the Nazi Party was banned following the failed Munich Putsch. It contained three sections:

- Jungmannschaften: boys aged 14 to 16 years
- Jungsturm Adolf Hitler: 16 to 18 years old
- The organisation also had a girls wing.
