= Francis Parker Yockey =

American fascist writer (1917–1960)

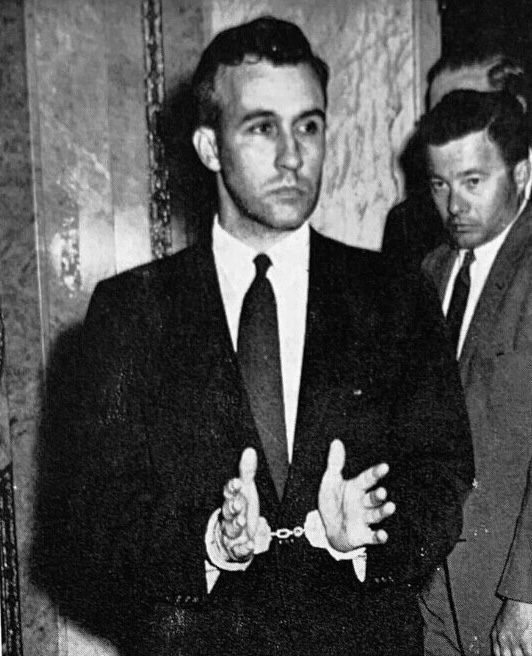
- Yockey in handcuffs after being arrested
- Born: September 18, 1917; Chicago, Illinois, U.S.
- Died: June 17, 1960 (aged 42); San Francisco County Jail, San Francisco, California, U.S.
- Cause of death: Suicide by cyanide poisoning
- Other name: Ulick Varange
- Education: University of Arizona (BA); Notre Dame Law School (JD)
- Occupations: Author, attorney
- Notable work: Imperium: The Philosophy of History and Politics

Francis Parker Yockey (September 18, 1917 – June 17, 1960) was an American fascist writer best known for his neo-Spenglerian book Imperium, published in 1948 under the pen name Ulick Varange, which called for a neo-Nazi European empire.

Yockey supported far-right causes around the world and remains an influence on white nationalist and neo-fascist movements. Yockey was an antisemite, a reverent proponent of German Nazism, and an early Holocaust denier. In the 1930s, he contacted and worked with the Nazi-aligned Silver Shirts and the German-American Bund. He served in the U.S. Army in 1942–43, and went AWOL to help Nazi spies. After legal appointments in Detroit during 1944 and 1945, he worked for 11 months on the War Crimes Tribunal in Germany before he either resigned or was fired for secretly and subversively siding with the Nazis. In London, he worked for the British fascist Oswald Mosley's Union Movement, and, after falling out with Mosley, founded the breakaway European Liberation Front in 1949, leading it until it fizzled, around 1954.

During the Cold War, Yockey reportedly worked with Soviet bloc intelligence, and argued for a tactical far-right alliance with the Soviets against what he saw as Jewish-American hegemony. He also briefly wrote anti-Jewish propaganda in Egypt, where he met its then president, Gamal Abdel Nasser. Yockey remained influential in fascist circles until his suicide in FBI custody in 1960. His last visitor in prison was Willis Carto, who fervently picked up the baton, becoming the leading advocate and publisher of Yockey's writings.

== Biography ==
Yockey had many aliases, and some facts about him are not certain. Acquaintances and declassified FBI files described him as a talented speaker, brilliant, well-read, sometimes charming, humorous and a gifted mimic — but also haughty, immature, secretive, a loner, and, in the FBI's words, "nervous, high-strung, erratic, unpredictable and dictatorial", with "an amazing capacity for alienating people".

=== Early life and education ===
Yockey was born on September 18, 1917, in Chicago, Illinois, to Louis and Rose Ellen Yockey. He was the youngest of four siblings in an upper-middle-class Roman Catholic family of Irish and German descent; he had two sisters, Vinette and Alice, and an older brother, James. His father was a stockbroker who had trained as a lawyer, while his mother studied at the Chicago Musical College. Yockey was raised in Ludington, Michigan. He learned classical piano, at which he excelled.

He began college as an undergraduate at the University of Michigan, then transferred to Georgetown University, and later completed his degree at the University of Arizona. Before starting law school at Northwestern University, he also studied law at De Paul University, and graduated from the Notre Dame Law School in 1941. In college, he declared he would not dine with black, Jewish or communist students.

Yockey had been attracted to Marxism in early life before gravitating to Adolf Hitler and Nazism in the 1930s, and in college, Oswald Spengler. Other influences include Karl Haushofer and the Nazi theorist Carl Schmitt, whom Yockey was later accused of plagiarizing. Yockey joined pro-German and pro-fascist groups in the late 1930s. In 1938, his essay "The Tragedy of Youth" was published in Social Justice, a journal known for publishing antisemitic tracts that was distributed by the "radio priest" Charles Coughlin. In 1939 Yockey spoke at a gathering of Silvershirts.

=== World War II and immediate postwar ===
Yockey enlisted in the U.S. Army in 1942, serving in an intelligence unit. He went AWOL from his camp in Georgia in November 1942 on a Nazi mission to Texas and Mexico City. According to Yockey's biographer Kevin Coogan, Yockey secretly helped German Nazi spies who had landed in the United States and Mexico. He was also a friend of a German American intelligence officer Herbert Hans Haupt, who stayed at the home of his wife and was later executed for espionage for his participation in Operation Pastorius. Later, Yockey received an honorable discharge from the Army for "dementia praecox, paranoid type" in 1943 after suffering a nervous breakdown or feigning one. He was placed on a government list of Americans suspected of pro-Nazi views. In 1944 he became an assistant prosecuting attorney for Wayne County, Michigan, but was bored by the work, leaving in 1945.

In early 1946, Yockey found a job with the United States War Department in Wiesbaden, Germany, as a post-trial review attorney for the Nuremberg Trials, and he moved to Germany with his wife and two daughters. Evidence suggests Yockey may have tried to help accused Nazi war criminals including SS General Otto Ohlendorf by sharing top-secret documents with German defense lawyers. Often absent from his job, he was fired for "abandonment of position" on November 26, 1946, when it was noticed that he was siding with the Nazis. He agitated against Allied occupation of Germany, and later worked for the Red Cross in Germany but deserted his post. U.S. intelligence began tracking Yockey in Germany in 1946 or 1947. Yockey left his estranged wife and daughters in Germany in 1947 for exile in Ireland.

Yockey was a central figure in early postwar Nazi networks. Over time, he contacted or worked with far-right figures and organizations including the German-American Bund, the National German-American Alliance, William Dudley Pelley's Silver Shirts, Sir Oswald Mosley's Union Movement, George Sylvester Viereck, the American H. Keith Thompson, Gerald L. K. Smith, and James H. Madole's National Renaissance Party. After the war Thompson and Madole became advocates of Yockey's worldview and published some of his essays.

=== Cold War years ===
Yockey identified the United States, not Russia, as Europe's main enemy, urged Europeans not to collaborate with America in the Cold War, and wanted to act against American forces in Germany and England. Yockey's ideas were usually embraced only by those who could countenance an alliance between the far left and the far right.

Without notes, Yockey wrote his first book, Imperium, in Brittas Bay, Ireland, over the winter and early spring of 1948. Imperium is a Spenglerian critique of 19th century materialism and rationalism that scorns democracy and equality, extols Nazism, and blames Jews for various problems. It is dedicated to "the hero of the Second World War", by which he meant Hitler. In an early example of Holocaust denial, it also claims that the Nazis' gas chambers were faked. Yockey mailed copies of Imperium to far-right figures in Europe and America. Views expressed in it were endorsed by former Nazi General Otto Remer (who had been Hitler's bodyguard); the American Revilo P. Oliver; and Italian esotericist Julius Evola, as well as the praise of Hans-Ulrich Rudel, Giorgio Almirante, Heinz Knoke, and Karl-Heinz Priester.

Yockey became embittered with Sir Oswald Mosley (Hitler's leading British proponent) after the latter refused to publish or review Imperium upon its completion, after having promised to do so. Mosley punched Yockey in the nose during a dispute in London's Hyde Park. With a small group of British fascists including the former Mosleyites Guy Chesham and John Gannon, Yockey formed the European Liberation Front (ELF) in 1948–49. The ELF formed ties with old Nazis along with other fascists. It issued a newsletter, Frontfighter, and in 1949 published Yockey's virulent anti-American, anti-communist and antisemitic text The Proclamation of London, which called for a reinstatement of Nazism and the expulsion of the Jews (whom it labeled "the Culture-distorter") from Europe. The ELF was opposed by other neo-fascist groups and essentially disappeared by 1954 due to members being alienated by Yockey's imperious personality.

The American Nazi Party of George Lincoln Rockwell rejected Yockey's anti-American attitude and willingness to work with anti-Zionist communist governments and movements. (Yockey told Willis Carto that he had never heard of the ANP when Carto visited him in prison in 1960.) Other neo-Nazis such as Rockwell's ally Colin Jordan disagreed with Yockey's views on race, and saw Yockeyism as being "Strasserist" which would undermine Nazism.

Declassified FBI files show that Yockey traveled to Los Angeles, San Francisco, and New York to collaborate with ultra-right activists, while eluding FBI agents who sought to question him. As a fugitive he spoke at the 1950 Christian Nationalist Party convention in Los Angeles organized by Gerald L. K. Smith. His intercepted letters to other fascists in the 1950s were often signed "Torquemada" after the Spanish Grand Inquisitor.

Yockey was approached by the group around the anti-Communist Senator Joseph McCarthy in 1951. He was asked to ghost-write a speech for McCarthy which stressed the importance of greater friendship between Germany and the United States. Although McCarthy never delivered it as the theme of the speech, when it was announced through posters in the Yorkville neighbourhood of New York City, the-then Left Wing newspaper The Daily Compass ran a front page expose, alongside negative press attention from the New York Post, probably influenced by the fact that a series of well known Holocaust deniers were going to speak alongside him.

Yockey collaborated with Soviet bloc intelligence, traveled behind the Iron Curtain, and was suspected of visiting East Germany, the Soviet Union and Cuba. One theory for this derives from a September 1956 story about a mysterious American man, who went by the name of "Frederick C. Hopkins" who was released from Soviet police custody on September 6, 1956. He wrote with approval of antisemitic purges in the Eastern bloc countries. In late 1952, he traveled to Prague and witnessed the Prague Trials, and asserted that they "foretold a Russian break with Jewry". He then became a Czechoslovak Secret Service courier. He is suspected of having been in contact with a Soviet agent by the name of Alfred Francke-Gricksch.

Yockey met Egyptian President Gamal Abdel Nasser, whom he called "a great and vigorous man", in Cairo in 1953. He worked briefly for the Egyptian Information Ministry, writing anti-Zionist propaganda. In the Arab world, he made contact with Nazi exiles including Otto Ernst Remer and Johann von Leers. Yockey reportedly tried to persuade Nasser to finance development of a cobalt bomb by ex-Nazi scientists.

Yockey was known as a womanizer, and had an affair with Hazel Guggenheim McKinley. In 1957, FBI agents assessed that he was "living in Los Angeles as a pimp or a gigolo" and had written pornography for money, including a sadomasochistic booklet called Arduous Figure Training at Bondhaven that was later found in his suitcase. The 62-page booklet was published by Nutrix Company of Jersey City and according to the FBI "contained numerous sketeches of partially clad females and [...] was of a masochistic or sadistic nature."

Coogan writes that "Yockey's occult interests had political ramifications" as he "clearly saw himself as part of an underground elite, a secret new race of god-men". Yockey was an owner of documents relating to Theosophy, according to the FBI. At the time of his suicide, he had copies of books and articles written by Baltasar Gracián, Otto Weininger, H. G. Wells, and George B. Leonard. He was an influential member of postwar Nazi circles.

=== Arrest and death ===
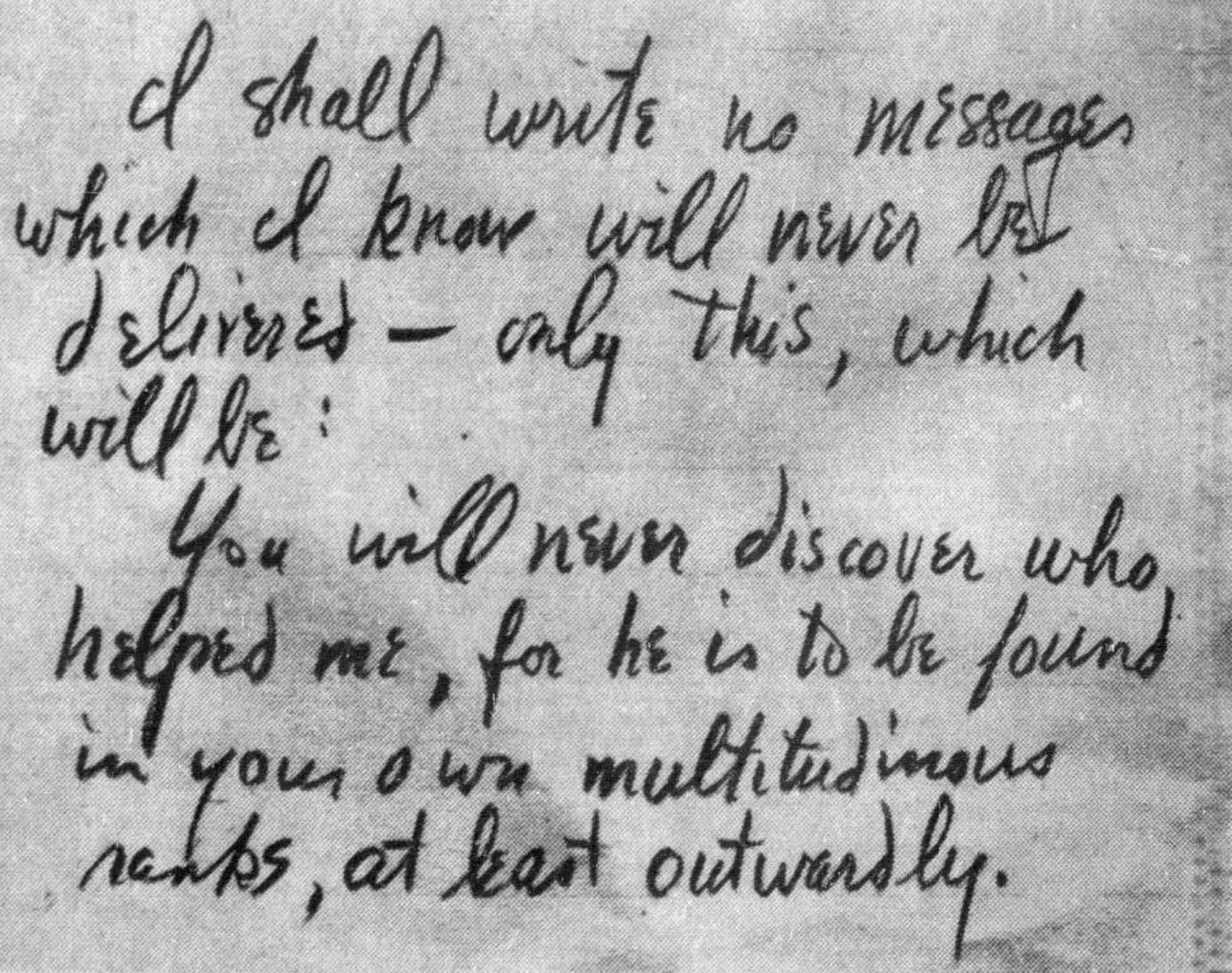
Yockey's suicide note

After more than a decade of pursuit by the FBI, Yockey was finally arrested in 1960 after returning to the United States from abroad. En route to Oakland, California, his suitcase had either been lost or had broken open at the Dallas airport, and authorities found several of Yockey's falsified passports and birth certificates. When this was reported to the federal government, the FBI tracked Yockey down in Oakland, California, and arrested him. While in prison, he was visited by Carto, his last visitor, excepting his attorney, who later became the chief advocate and publisher of Yockey's ideas. While Yockey was there, he was staying with the principal of a yeshiva called Alexander Scharf, whom he had met in Reno and intended to give a loan of US$2,000.

Yockey was soon after found dead with an empty cyanide capsule nearby while in a jail cell in San Francisco under FBI supervision. Writing after his suicide, the San Francisco Chronicle declared him "as important a figure in world Fascism as we now know." He wrote a suicide note, left under his pillow which read:

I shall write no messages which I know will never be delivered – only this, which will be:
You will never discover who helped me, for he is to be found in your own multitudinous ranks, at least outwardly.

== Views and legacy ==
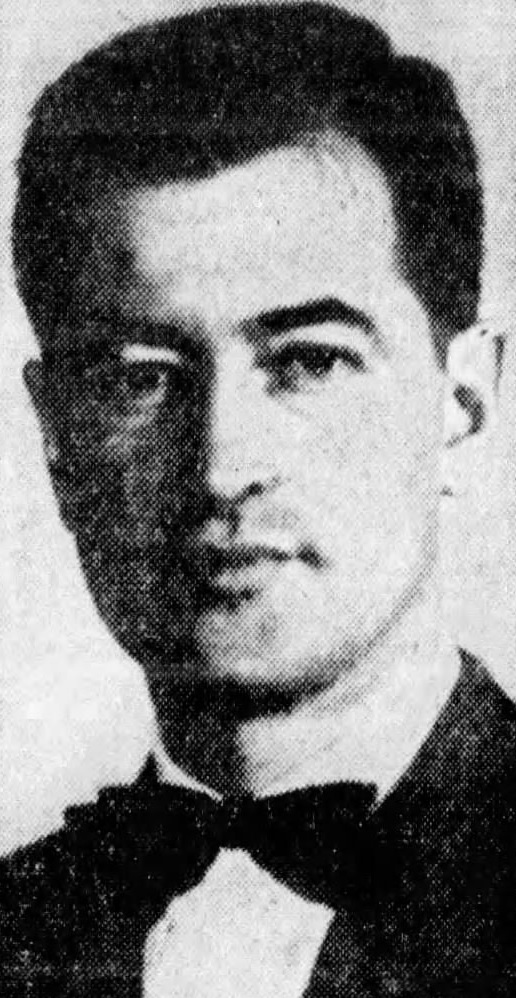
Willis Carto in 1961; Carto promoted Yockey

While some postwar European and American nationalists of the post-war period sided with the United States against communism, or in other cases argued for third positionism, Yockey argued for a red-brown alliance (red representing the far-left and brown representing the far-right) against what he saw as Jewish-American hegemony. He argued that rightists should aid the spread of communism and Third World anti-colonial movements when they threatened the United States. This view did not have a very significant influence on the American right, which in the Cold War for the most part remained anti-communist. He had a greater impact in Europe, in the European New Right, where for instance the Belgian Jean Thiriart and the Frenchmen Christian Bouchet, René Binet, and Dominique Venner are known to have been influenced by him. Additionally, the Russian philosopher Aleksandr Dugin, and the French writer Alain de Benoist, adopted positions similar to Yockey's, although there is little evidence his work influenced them in this. He also influenced National Renaissance Party founder James H. Madole. The British military writers Liddell Hart and J.F.C. Fuller who was a member of the British Union of Fascists gave early praise to Imperium.

Yockey's present influence is reflected mostly through the work of Willis Carto and his Liberty Lobby and successor organizations. According to Stephen E. Atkins, "Because of the efforts of Carto, Yockey is more popular after his death than he ever was when he was alive". Carto became a fervent proponent of Yockey's writings and published them. Carto ran the Youth for George Wallace group supporting segregationist George Wallace's 1968 presidential campaign. That group formed the basis for the National Youth Alliance, which promoted Yockey's political philosophy and his book Imperium. Core members of Carto's political groups were members of the Francis Parker Yockey Society, a neo-Nazi cult. Additionally, the founder of the National Alliance and author of The Turner Diaries, William Luther Pierce, was influenced by Yockey. Afterward, Yockey continued to be a cult figure among neo-fascists. His influence also persists among Odinists. According to the American political scientist George Hawley, "Yockey's vision of a global fascist movement that transcends national borders is now a common trope within the Alt-Right".

Yockey is also remembered as an early and influential Holocaust denier. In the 1980s, Holocaust denier Keith Stimely, a Yockey devotee who Coogan described as surpassing the previously established "absolute limit" of "Yockeyism", undertook extensive research on Yockey, and aimed to write a book about him. He never wrote the book before he died of AIDS in 1992. In 1999, the writer Kevin Coogan, incorporating Stimely's research, wrote the first full biography of Yockey, Dreamer of the Day. The far-right activist Kerry Bolton wrote Yockey: A Fascist Odyssey, a biography published by alt-right Arktos Media, in 2018.

Yockey was virulently racist and despised black people and Jews. However, Yockey was not a scientific racist, and did not believe in biological race, viewing it to be a "materialist" interpretation; he instead believed race was a spiritual matter, rather than one of skin color or phenotype. In Yockey's view, some white people were spiritually racially Jewish, while some "Jews have adopted Western feelings and thereby acquired Western race". Hence he believed that "any man who shares the feeling of this Mission, and any group which shares it, regardless of the derivation of the man or group", would share in the "crusade" of the white man, and so become white in a spiritual sense. As a result, the mixed-race neo-Nazi Leo Felton (half black, half white), and the Jewish neo-Nazi Dan Burros, were fascinated by and advocated Yockey and his writings, viewing Yockey's ideology as a way to justify their path. The Order of Nine Angles, a Satanist group, is known to draw from his beliefs. Additionally, far-right political activist Augustus Sol Invictus has drawn inspiration from Yockey's book Imperium.

== Bibliography ==
- Yockey, Francis Parker (2013) Imperium, London: Abergele: The Palingenesis Project (Wermod and Wermod)
- Yockey, Francis Parker (2012) The Proclamation of London. Shamley Green:The Palingenesis Project ISBN 978-0-9561835-9-0
- Yockey, Francis Parker and Oliver, Revilo P. The Enemy of Europe by Francis Parker Yockey and ISBN 0-942094-00-X
- Yockey, Francis Parker The World in Flames: The Shorter Writings of Francis Parker Yockey
