= National Renaissance Party (United States) =

American neo-fascist group

- Abbreviation: NRP
- Leader: James H. Madole (1949–1979)
- Founder: Kurt Mertig
- Founded: 1949
- Dissolved: 1981
- Preceded by: Animist Party
- Headquarters: New York City
- Paramilitary wing: Security Echelon
- Membership: ~50–700
- Ideology: Neo-Nazism
- Political position: Far-right

Party flag

The National Renaissance Party (NRP) was an American neo-Nazi group founded in 1949, led for most of its history by James H. Madole. It was frequently in the headlines during the 1950s and 1960s for its involvement in violent protests and riots in New York City. It published a journal, National Renaissance Bulletin. After Madole's death from cancer in 1979, the party faded after its records were lost in a car crash that killed another member on his way home from Madole's funeral.

== History ==
NRP demonstration 1953, from the left: James Madole and Matt Koehl

The National Renaissance Party was founded in January 1949 by Kurt Mertig, a veteran pro-Nazi organizer previously associated with the German-American Bund, through the merger of several earlier American fascist organizations.

One of the parties that helped found the NRP was the Animist Party, established in 1945 by a young science fiction fan and right-wing activist James H. Madole. Mertig soon handed over the leadership of the party to Madole, a position he held for the next 30 years. Its headquarters were in the Yorkville area of New York City.

=== 1950s ===
In April 1953 the NRP established a think tank under the name of the American Committee for the Advancement of Western Culture and under the direction of H. Keith Thompson. By 1954, government investigators, although unable to determine the exact size of the party, estimated its membership to be between 200 and 700, although political scientist John George thought that NRP membership never exceeded 50 at any given time.

The NRP was investigated by the House Un-American Activities Committee (HUAC) for possible prosecution under the Smith Act, although no action was ever taken in this regard. The investigation began in 1954, when HUAC commissioned a staff report on the group.

According to The New York Times, the report found "that the National Renaissance Party appeared to have controvened the Smith Act (against advocacy of overthrow of the Government by force or violence) as much as had the Communist party itself" and that the NRP "had 'virtually borrowed wholesale' from Fascist and Nazi dictators material for its program," which included the abolition of American democracy, a "fascist" economy controlled by corporations, deportation of "unassimilable" people and oppression of Jews.

=== 1960s ===
By 1963 Madole was running the party out of his apartment at 10 West 90th Street. On May 25, 1963, an NRP rally on First Avenue between 85th Street and 86th Street was attended by approximately 2500 hecklers who threw "eggs and oranges" at the participants while Jack Weiser, commander of the Jewish War Veterans of New York State, attempted to make a citizen's arrest of James H. Madole for "inciting to riot against the Jewish people." At least one member, Louis Mostaccio, was arrested for assault on an NYPD detective as a result of this incident. Mostaccio, who attacked the detective with a flagpole, was convicted in June 1963 of assault but acquitted of the additional charge of "violating the weapons law by being in possession of the flagpole." Mostaccio ended up serving five days for his crime.

Later that year, 8 members of the NRP were arrested in New York and charged with "planning to incite rioting" at two White Castle restaurants in The Bronx. According to the charges, the NRP plotted riots in response to demonstrations sponsored by the Congress of Racial Equality demanding an end to racially discriminatory hiring practices at the White Castles. Madole and Dan Burros were among those arrested, and searches of the members' homes and vehicles turned up, in addition to the usual anti-semitic literature, a "crossbow, steel-tipped arrows, a revolver, a flare gun, a derringer, and a tear-gas pen and pencil set." In addition the weapons cache included "bottles of nitric acid, machetes, and bayonets."

The 8 NRP members were indicted in August 1963. District Attorney Isidore Dollinger was quoted in The New York Times as saying that he considered "the prosecution of these individuals, who are closely connected with the American Renaissance Party [sic] — a Nazi movement — to be of the utmost importance." Six of the 8 were sentenced in July 1964, with Madole and Burros, called "hate mongers" by the presiding judge, getting two years each. Soon thereafter, both Burros and Madole were released pending appeal.

In the summer of 1965, the NRP applied to the New York City Board of Education for permission to hold party meetings at the Robert Wagner Junior High School at 220 E. 76th Street in Yorkville. The Board initially refused, citing concerns that "the proposed meeting might tend to cause dissension or provoke disorder." Future United States Solicitor General and then New York City Corporation Counsel J. Lee Rankin informed Board president Lloyd K. Garrison in February 1966 that the NRP had a legal right to use the facility. One week after receiving Rankin's opinion, the Board voted to allow the NRP to meet at the school, a decision which was protested by the Anti-Defamation League of B'nai B'rith. The NRP held its first meeting at the school on March 18, 1966. James H. Madole and others spoke to an audience of about 200 people, who greeted the NRP leadership with general derision. Major John Ryan, commander of the NRP security echelon, moved the audience to laughter with his claim that the NRP intended to "recruit and train clean-cut young men and women for the party." Ryan ended his speech by pronouncing the slogan "white man unite, white man fight."

In 1965 the Orange County, New York Board of Supervisors decided to allow political parties to hold meetings in court houses in Goshen and Newburgh and the NRP applied to use them. The Board refused, insisting that the NRP, rather than being a political party, was a "fascist" and "subversive" organization. The NRP sued, and, in June 1967, the New York Court of Appeals overruled the County's decision and a lower court, which had upheld it. The NRP finally managed to arrange a meeting at the Orange County Courthouse in Newburgh on July 29, 1967. Protests against the meeting turned into riots in black sections of the small city and over 30 protestors were arrested for vandalism and throwing rocks at police officers.

=== 1970s and the end of the NRP ===
During the 1970s, after Weiss's death, Madole effectively ran the NRP and steered it toward an esoteric direction. From 1974 on, Madole wrote a series of articles in the NRP's bulletin, "The New Atlantis: A blueprint for an Aryan Garden of Eden in North America", which scholar Nicholas Goodrick-Clarke described as "his major occult-political treatise".

Andrej Lisanik, a former Czech military officer who served as the commander of the paramilitary of the NRP, was killed by a mugger in October 1977. Madole died on May 6, 1979, and the party followed. Following Madole's funeral, his mother turned over the NRP's records to loyalist Jean Charlebois. On his way home, following the service, Charlebois vehicle struck a concrete abutment on the highway. Charlebois was killed, and the NRP's records flew away in the wind. By 1981, the party was defunct.

== Party doctrine and associations ==
The NRP's doctrines included standard elements of fascism, including white supremacy, anti-semitism, and opposition to democracy. The NRP used a blue lightning bolt within a white circle on a field of red as its symbol. The "Elite Guard" (stormtroopers) wore gray and black uniforms with armbands featuring a lightning bolt within a circle. The NRP was named for a phrase from the Last will and testament of Adolf Hitler, which stated that "I die with a happy heart aware [that there] will spring up...the seed of a radiant renaissance of the National Socialist movement." The group also had an "elite Security Echelon," headed in the 1960s by Dan Burros. In 1965, after leaving the NRP, Burros killed himself when the The New York Times publicized the fact that he was Jewish.

The party also endorsed standard racist ideas such as "the voluntary repatriation of the black man back to Africa" and the sterilization of black welfare recipients. It maintained ties with other neo-Nazi organizations, such as George Lincoln Rockwell's American Nazi Party, which occasionally supplied the NRP with fascist literature for distribution.

Madole was also influenced by the theosophical ideas of Helena Blavatsky, which he used as a theoretical underpinning for his opposition to racial mixing. The NRP also maintained good relations with a number of far-out mystical groups, such as the Church of Satan, whose founder, Anton LaVey, was a personal friend of Madole's. Madole and LaVey frequently met at the NRP office and in the Warlock Bookshop in New York. The NRP was associated with the Satanic neo-Nazi organization the Order of the Black Ram, established in the 1970s by Seth Kliphoth, the Michigan state NRP organizer. Many of the Order's members were also members of the NRP.

One of the stranger aspects of the party is that they maintained an Overseas Office, which was headed by Manny Truhill, who claimed to be half-French and half-Apache. He had attended the CPUSA-run Jefferson School of Social Science. The party also supported the Socialist Reich Party for supporting Communism against Jews.

NRP maintained contacts with Pekka Siitoin whose groups likewise blended satanism and Nazism. Siitoin's Patriotic Popular Front published NRP's material in Finnish, and Siitoin appeared in NRP's publications.

== National Renaissance Bulletin ==
The NRP published a journal, National Renaissance Bulletin, which, unlike its political activities in New York City, was widely influential in far-right circles. In the early 1950s, H. Keith Thompson and Frederick Weiss subsidized a larger-than-usual print run of an issue of the magazine containing an essay by Francis Parker Yockey entitled What is Behind the Hanging of the Eleven Jews in Prague? on the Prague show trials of Rudolf Slánský and ten other Jewish members of the Communist Party of Czechoslovakia, which Yockey had attended. Eustace Mullins, who Martin A. Lee called "the NRP's self-proclaimed expert on the U.S. Federal Reserve," published his notorious article Adolf Hitler: An Appreciation in the journal as well.

== See also ==
- Esoteric neo-Nazism
- Conde McGinley
- Joe McWilliams
- Kerry Bolton
- European Liberation Front
