= Johann von Leers =

Nazi and Egyptian propagandist (1902–1965)

Johann von Leers Omar Amin
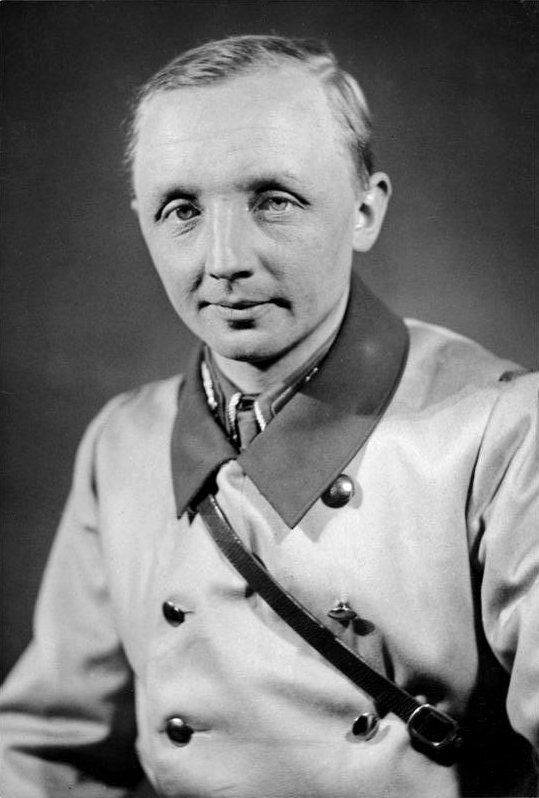
- Leers in 1933
- Born: 25 January 1902; Karbow-Vietlübbe, Germany
- Died: 5 March 1965 (aged 63); Cairo, Egypt
- Military career
- Allegiance: Nazi Germany; United Arab Republic
- Branch: Waffen-SS
- Rank: SS-Sturmbannführer

Omar Amin (born Johann Jakob von Leers; 25 January 1902 – 5 March 1965) was an Alter Kämpfer and an honorary Sturmbannführer in the Waffen-SS in Nazi Germany, where he was also a professor known for his anti-Jewish polemics. He was one of the most important ideologues of the Third Reich, serving as a high-ranking propaganda ministry official. He later served in the Egyptian Information Department, as well as an advisor to Gamal Abdel Nasser. He published for Goebbels, in Peron's Argentina, and for Nasser's Egypt. He converted to Islam, and changed his name to Omar Amin.

== Early life and education ==
Johann von Leers was born in Vietlübbe, in the Grand Duchy of Mecklenburg-Schwerin, Germany on 25 January 1902. He studied law at the universities of Berlin, Kiel, and Rostock, and eventually worked as an attache in the German Foreign Office. He joined the Viking League, the Freikorps and then Adler und Falke. Leers became actively involved in Völkisch politics during the Weimar Republic and joined the Nazi Party in 1929. He was a district speaker and leader of the National Socialist German Students' League, and in 1933 signed the Gelöbnis treuester Gefolgschaft, the "vow of most faithful allegiance" to Adolf Hitler.

== Career ==
=== Weimar Republic ===
During the late 1920s, Leers was the leading foreign policy critic of the Strasserist wing of the Nazi Party and was a staunch critic of Alfred Rosenberg.

=== Nazi Germany ===
Supporting himself by writing freelance articles for the Nazi Party press, after the Nazis came to power in 1933, Leers was summoned by Joseph Goebbels to work in the propaganda ministry, where he was assigned to proliferate party propaganda, eventually penning 27 books between 1933 and 1945.

Leers was a proponent of realpolitik, advocating a race-free foreign relations policy on the basis of relationship and alliance. He wrote the memo which led to the exemption of non-Jewish racial minorities from race laws in the Third Reich in 1934, 1936, and 1937.

In 1936, Leers was commissioned into the Waffen-SS as an SS-Untersturmführer, eventually becoming a full honorary SS-Sturmbannführer. He went on to serve as a lecturer at the University of Jena.

He was fluent in five languages, including Dutch and Japanese.

Jeffrey Herf reports that in December 1942 Leers published an article in Die Judenfrage, the original text:

Mohammed's hostility to the Jews had one result: Oriental Jewry was completely paralyzed. Its backbone was broken. Oriental Jewry effectively did not participate in [European] Jewry's tremendous rise to power in the last two centuries. Despised in the filthy lanes of the mellah (the walled Jewish quarter of a Moroccan city, analogous to the European ghetto) the Jews vegetated there. They lived under a special law (that of a protected minority), which in contrast to Europe did not permit usury or even traffic in stolen goods, but kept them in a state of oppression and anxiety. If the rest of the world had adopted a similar policy, we would not have a Jewish Question... As a religion, Islam indeed performed an eternal service to the world: it prevented the threatened conquest of Arabia by the Jews and vanquished the horrible teaching of Jehovah by a pure religion, which at that time opened the way to a higher culture for numerous peoples ....

=== After the Second World War ===
In 1945, Leers fled from Germany to Italy, where he lived for five years, then in 1950 migrated to Argentina, where he continued his propaganda activities. During this period he was a contributor to Der Weg, a Nazi publication founded in Buenos Aires in 1947. He was praised by Haj Amin al-Husseini, Grand Mufti of Jerusalem and a Nazi wartime ally, for his loyalty to Arab nationalism. Thereafter he moved from Argentina to Egypt.

In Buenos Aires, Leers became editor of Der Weg and praised American political theorist Francis Parker Yockey and his 1948 book Imperium (influenced in large part by the works of Oswald Spengler), for his understanding of the nuanced global-political landscape which subsequently arose between the American-led NATO coalition and its Soviet-led Warsaw Pact counterpart. Leers was also sympathetic toward Yockey's active participation in attempts to form a Pan-European resistance movement, which sought to liberate Europe from the occupation and influence of both the Soviet Union and America.

The Swedish journalist and writer Elisabeth Åsbrink probed the reasons for Sweden's centrality in the European far-right scene in her book 1947: When Now Begins. In it, she portrays Per Engdahl (1909–1994), the leader of the Swedish fascist movement, who created an escape route for Nazis from all parts of Europe. This route passed through northern Germany and Denmark, leading to Malmö in Sweden. From there, the fleeing Nazis were smuggled to various places in southern Sweden and then sent by ship from Gothenburg to South America. Engdahl claimed to have saved about 4,000 Nazis in this way. One of those whom Engdahl assisted was Johann von Leers, who "arrived in Malmö in 1947, and ... got to Buenos Aires, where he edited a paper that became a communications channel between Nazis in Europe and those who ended up in Latin America".

Leers was later persuaded to migrate to Egypt by Haj Amin al-Husseini, with the assistance of Leers' friend Hassan Awas Fakoussa, who by then was a Palestinian leader living in Egypt, with whom he was in close contact. There, he converted to Islam and changed his name to Omar Amin, as a gesture to his benefactor, and became the political adviser to the Information Department under Muhammad Naguib and Gamal Abdel Nasser, as well as being friendly with al-Husseini. Eventually he became the head of President Nasser's 'Israeli' propaganda unit and served as head of the Institute for the Study of Zionism, managing anti-Israeli propaganda. Leers was a mentor of Ahmed Huber and networked with Muslim emigres in Hamburg, while also being an acquaintance of Otto Ernst Remer in the country.

Leers died in Egypt on 5 March 1965, aged 63. His remains were returned to Germany at the expense of the Egyptian government and in June 1965 were buried in Schutterwald, in an Islamic funeral.
