= Joe McWilliams =

American political consultant

Joseph Elsberry McWilliams (March 23, 1904 – June 30, 1996) was an American far right political figure and founder of the Christian Mobilizers. He was the principal defendant in the federal Smith Act sedition trial of 1944.

== Biography ==
McWilliams was born in 1904 to a poor pioneer family in Hitchcock, Oklahoma. In his earlier days McWilliams was well known for using an American-flag-draped covered Conestoga wagon for publicizing his rallies and speeches, as well as for drawing attention to his cause. Most of his early rallies were impromptu street presentations that at times ended violently, as one did on July 4, 1940, in New York City. A crowd which had supported McWilliams became angry when he began to disparage Jews, Communists and businessmen for the world's problems. McWilliams was arrested, and using his arrest to further his cause through newspaper reports of his speech and the violence that resulted.

In 1939, McWilliams led a group called Christian Mobilizers that splintered from the Christian Front founded by Charles Coughlin. McWilliams supported an escalation on the violence against Jews and communists, as well as cooperation with the German American Bund, which Coughlin had distanced himself from. McWilliams appealed for support from African Americans, stating that the Christian Front would "mobilize all the Negroes" in Harlem and that, "on the day of reckoning, the Negroes will join with the Christians in annihilating the common enemy." McWilliams promised African Americans who supported him that they "would get first choice on his extermination squads."

In 1940, McWilliams ran for Congress as a Republican in the 18th Congressional District of New York, which is around what was then the heavily German Yorkville section of Manhattan. After losing the primary by a large margin, he made a second bid for office under the American Destiny Party, a political organization he had founded and based on the Nazi Party. McWilliams was disqualified from the ballot after failing to gather enough signatures. In July 1940, he was found guilty of disorderly conduct for making an antisemitic speech and ordered to either serve a 30-day jail term or pay a $50 fine. McWilliams agreed to pay the fine. In September 1940, he was convicted of another count of disorderly conduct for using abusive language towards Jews at a street meeting on July 12, 1940. McWilliams was sentenced to 75 days in jail, of which he served 68 days.

In 1944, McWilliams was identified as the main defendant in the government prosecution of 30 suspected conspirators and sympathizers under the Smith Act. The 30 were widely varied, including the anti-Capitalist Fascist Lawrence Dennis. After seven months U.S. District Court Judge Edward C. Eicher died of a heart attack, causing a mistrial. After the war ended, the government chose not to pursue the case.

After World War II, he briefly worked on the campaign of North Carolina Democratic Senator Robert Rice Reynolds, who had been a fascist sympathizer.

McWilliams died on June 30, 1996.
