= James H. Madole =

American neo-Nazi activist (1927–1979)

- Madole at a rally in 1953
- Born: James Harting Madole; July 7, 1927; New Bedford, Massachusetts, U.S.
- Died: May 6, 1979 (aged 51); New York City, U.S.
- Occupations: Political activist, writer
- Years active: 1945–1979
- Organization: National Renaissance Party
- Movement: Neo-Nazism

James Harting Madole (July 7, 1927 – May 6, 1979) was an American neo-Nazi activist and leader of the National Renaissance Party from shortly after the party's founding in 1949 to his death. Madole is best known for being one of the first figures to mix neo-Nazism with occultism and esotericism, and is regarded by scholars as a pivotal figure in the development of esoteric neo-Nazism. Madole was known as an eccentric figure and never achieved the notoriety of his contemporary George Lincoln Rockwell.

Interested in science fiction from his youth, he developed a worldview based on science fiction. Through science fiction he discovered fascism; as a teenager, Madole developed a science fiction based right-wing party called the Animist Party. He dissolved the Animist Party in 1948 when he realized that many of its members were actually infiltrators. Aged 22, he was given control of Kurt Mertig's National Renaissance Party shortly after it was founded; behind the scenes, Frederick Charles Weiss exercised great control of it during its early years. In 1954, Madole was a major subject of the investigation of the House Un-American Activities Committee (HUAC) into American neo-fascism. In the 1970s, Madole took the NRP in an esoteric direction and wrote a lengthy esoteric treatise called "The New Atlantis", largely isolated from the broader neo-Nazi movement.

Madole had a somewhat fantastical approach to far-right politics, incorporating ideas from science fiction, occultism, Theosophy, neopaganism, and Satanism. Other neo-Nazis accused Madole of being a communist due to his sympathies with the Soviet Union and the message of Francis Parker Yockey. Following his death from cancer in 1979, the NRP ceased to function and Madole was largely forgotten. His message was revived in later years by neo-Nazis interested in occultism.

== Early life ==
James Harting Madole was born July 7, 1927, in New Bedford, Massachusetts, to parents James Madole and Grace Harting. His father, James Madole, was born in Chicago and worked as an engineer. He was of French descent. His mother, Grace Harting, was born in Wappingers Falls, New York, and worked as a clerk. They married in 1926. His parents separated when he was young–his father cited "desertion", though journalist Kevin Coogan says Madole was "abandoned by his father when he was two"–and Madole was raised by his mother. He had no contact with his father throughout his life, and when he was 22 years old said that he did not know if his father was dead or alive.

In September 1942, Madole, aged 15, wrote to the science fiction-fantasy magazine Weird Tales, asking for guides on demon summoning

From his youth, he was severely asthmatic. He was initially raised in Brooklyn, then moved with his mother to the Bronx as his mother suspected this would help his asthma. This did not work, and they later moved to Beacon, New York, where Madole grew up. He was raised irreligious. His mother worked most of the day, leaving him largely isolated. Growing up, he had no close relationships besides his mother, and at school kept to himself. Madole was close to his mother and lived with her throughout his adult life. A journalist contemporary to Madole wrote that he seemed to have a "fixation" on her. Grace Madole was deeply antisemitic, and she encouraged her son in adopting her political views.

In his youth Madole developed an interest in science, particularly astronomy and chemistry, and built a laboratory at home. He was fascinated by science fiction, and, while still a teenager, developed an elaborate plan for a galactic "new worlds order" along science fiction lines. In July 1942, he joined the Weird Tales Club of the science fiction-horror-fantasy magazine Weird Tales. Through science fiction Madole discovered fascism, and science fiction elements shaped the way he viewed his fascist beliefs. Madole graduated from Beacon High School in 1946.

== Political career ==
=== Animist Party ===
Madole in 1949

Through science fiction circles, Madole met the fascist activist Charles B. Hudson, who influenced him greatly. In 1945, Madole founded the Animist Party, which was right-wing and largely made up of fans of sci-fi. In early 1946, Madole wrote to the science fiction magazine Startling Stories promoting the party, saying it was aimed to "bring together all the Science Fiction groups into one unit for the purpose of creating our better world now." The editor of Startling Stories responded negatively. The Animist Party was advertised in a number of science fiction and fantasy fanzines; several people joined the party.

After graduating high school he worked at a textile company. He began to engage increasingly in far-right and antisemitic politics; when his employers, who were Jewish, learned of his political activities, Madole was fired. Madole only intensified his focus on fascism in response. He described his philosophy of "Animism" as having "values of individual personality, private enterprise, and government by the intellectual elite", rejecting liberal democracy. In 1948, Madole dissolved the group when he discovered that multiple members were antifascist infiltrators. After meeting Hudson, Madole was supported by several America First groups, and came into contact with Kurt Mertig of the Citizens Protective League. He also joined William Henry MacFarland's Nationalist Action League (NAL).

=== National Renaissance Party, HUAC investigation ===
Madole speaking to a gathering in 1953

In 1949, Mertig founded the National Renaissance Party in Yorkville, though Madole was sometimes described as the founder. Madole described it as the merger of three groups: Mertig's Citizens Protective League, the German-American Republican League, and the Nationalist Action League. The name was inspired by Adolf Hitler's "Last Political Testament" before his suicide, which hoped for a "radiant renaissance" for Nazism. Mertig was by then elderly and found in Madole, then 22, a successor.

By November of 1949, Madole was credited as leader of the NRP. For many years, he frequently gave speeches on street corners in Yorkville. Madole continued to live with his mother, who was in total agreement with her son's views. The NRP embraced his "Animism" philosophy in these days. The NRP went on marches in Nazi uniform with his stormtroopers. The NRP gained much publicity as a result, frequently making the headlines but only garnered a small following. It maintained an assortment of international connections with other fascist organizations. The group wore Nazi storm-trooper uniforms and drew hecklers, leading to fistfights. Newspaper reports that year claimed he had helped the NRP organize riots in Peekskill. A 1949 article in the leftist newspaper The Daily Compass wrote of Madole in the aftermath that:

Madole turned out to be a thin anemic-looking boy of 22, who suffers from chronic asthma and cannot stand too much excitement. On seeing him, you know instantly that this wispy person did not organize the Peekskill violence. At most he might have dreamed he did. Madole actually seems to be in a trance. His eyes are glassy and when a question is asked suddenly, his eyes turn downward and his head jerks sidewise.

Although Madole took over the party's leadership, the organization was in fact controlled behind the scenes in its early years by Frederick Charles Weiss, who used it to spread his propaganda internationally. Weiss, though he was never an official leader of the organization, then considered Madole to be merely a pawn. In 1954, Madole achieved some degree of notoriety for being a primary subject of the 1954 investigation of the House Un-American Activities Committee (HUAC) into American neo-fascism. Though primarily focused on investigating left-wing political activity, the HUAC dedicated a probe to American neo-fascism, and identified Madole and the NRP as major neofascist players in America. The report advocated that the government investigate if the NRP's leaders could be prosecuted under the Smith Act, though this was not done. The report identified Weiss as a driving force behind the NRP.

=== Conviction, Dan Burros, and resulting scandal ===
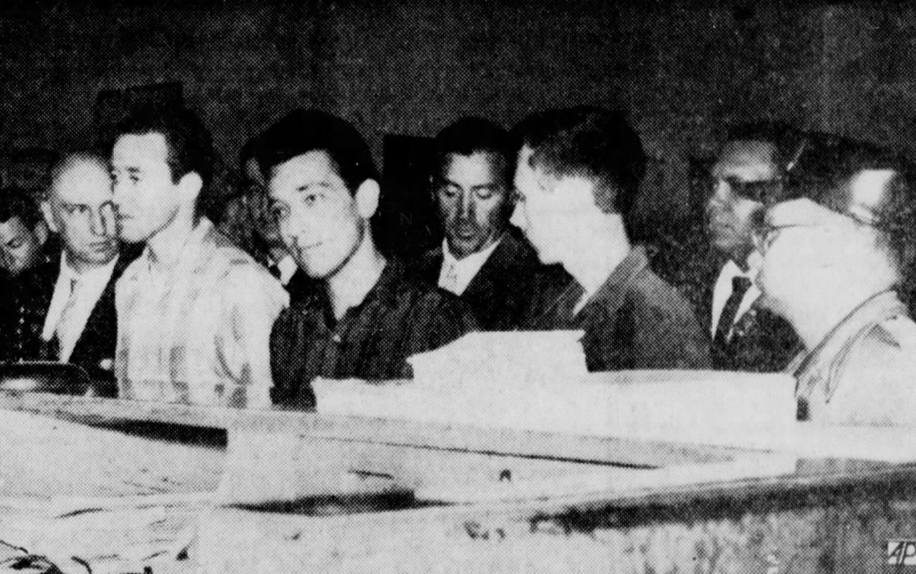
Their July 1963 booking. Madole is to the far-left, Dan Burros is to the far-right

Madole was known for his eccentric personality. As a result, Madole was far more obscure than George Lincoln Rockwell, a contemporary of Madole and the founder of the American Nazi Party (ANP). Madole despised Rockwell, considering him his major rival; Rockwell, in turn, did not give Madole much notice. In 1963, Dan Burros, a former member of the ANP, joined the NRP. Madole and Burros had personal disputes, disliking each other's personalities and specific views. Madole took issue with Burros's swastika obsession, the extreme nature of his views, and worried that Burros was a spy for Rockwell; nevertheless, Burros was useful, so Madole let him stay. Impressed by Burros's ideological fervor, Madole promoted him to the party's high-ranking Security Echelon.

In July 1963, Madole, Burros, and several other NRP members were jailed after getting into a fight with Congress of Racial Equality (CORE) protestors at a diner. They were not arrested for the fight, but after they went to file a complaint against the CORE members, a police detective found a stash of weapons and racist literature in their car. Both Madole and Burros were arrested and indicted for conspiracy and several other crimes. All were released on bail, and the case took ten months to come to trial. In 1964, they were convicted. Madole and Burros both received two year sentences. The judge blamed Madole and Burros, the most "sophisticated" members of the party, for leading the rest astray. All of the men were released in less than two weeks after an appeal.

Madole and Burros then had a falling-out. One telling says this resulted from Burros's wish to nuke communist China, contrary to Madole's growing appreciation of China and leftist figures. Madole claimed Burros left the party because he was still loyal to Rockwell. In 1965, Burros killed himself when The New York Times publicized the fact that he was Jewish (a fact Burros had known all along, but had hidden). This resulted in bad publicity for Madole, and the NRP had issues for several years following his death. In response to Burros's suicide, Madole wrote an article for the National Renaissance Bulletin entitled "The Historical and Metaphysical Roots of the Conflict between Jew and Gentile", where he defended Burros as a genuine Nazi despite his ethnicity, and praised him for a willingness to "blast himself into oblivion as final proof of his loyalty."

=== Increasing focus on occultism ===
Part of "The New Atlantis", printed in the National Renaissance Bulletin

When the Satanist organization the Church of Satan was formed in 1966, Madole quickly sought out connections with its founder, Anton LaVey. They attempted to ally with each other in the late 1960s, and there was some overlap in their group memberships. According to a former NRP member, LaVey and Madole frequently met, and Madole set up a Satanic altar in his apartment; he would play LaVey's Satanic audio recordings during NRP meetings. A picture from the NRP's bulletin during that time shows Madole and several NRP members alongside Satanists.

During the 1970s, after Weiss's death, Madole effectively ran the NRP and steered it toward an esoteric direction. In 1973, the NRP's Michigan organizer, Seth Kliphoth, also a Church of Satan member, founded the Order of the Black Ram (OBR), a Satanist group that mixed Satanism with neo-Nazism. They allied with Madole and the NRP, and maintained close ties to the NRP throughout its existence. From 1974 on, Madole wrote a series of articles in the NRP's bulletin, "The New Atlantis: A blueprint for an Aryan Garden of Eden in North America", which scholar Nicholas Goodrick-Clarke described as "his major occult-political treatise". Madole continued writing along these lines, isolated from the broader neo-Nazi scene.

Madole died from cancer on May 6, 1979, aged 51. The party followed him and ceased to be active shortly after. For a time, his mother tried to keep the group alive, encouraging other people to take up Madole's mantle. He was briefly succeeded by the Security Echelon commander Andrej Lisanik; shortly after, he was killed, and with NRP records lost with Lisanik's death, the group was entirely defunct by 1980. Madole was initially forgotten following his death, but later neo-Nazi groups interested in occultism and Satanism rediscovered Madole's message in later decades.

== Views ==
Madole speaking to a rally in Brooklyn in 1975

Madole interpreted Nazism through an occult and Theosophic lens, with influence from Hinduism. Many of his ideas were fantastical and heavily influenced by science fiction. Fiercly antisemitic, he described Jews as "an alien virus in our national bloodstream". Unlike most of the white supremacist and neo-Nazi movements of the era, Madole was extremely hostile to Christianity, perceiving it as a Jewish creation; as a result, he embraced occultism, Satanism, and neopaganism, developing a number of contacts among these groups.

He declared the NRP's goal a "racial nationalist state". He was against "race mixing", comparing it to "mixing lions and tigers". He spoke appreciatively of the Aztecs, Toltecs, and Mayan civilizations, claiming they were "pure blood" races that were destroyed through admixture; he compared this to the mixture of black Americans with white Americans, which he claimed would result in similar civilizational destruction. He advocated the deportation of all non white peoples, particularly deporting black Americans to Africa. He praised Hitler, writing that "What Hitler accomplished in Europe, the National Renaissance Party shall yet accomplish in America."

A devotee of Francis Parker Yockey's book Imperium, Madole was one of the few to accept his argument that Soviet Bolshevism had preserved traditional values more than western liberalism, and that communism was not supported by Judaism. Prior to discovering Yockey, he believed Bolshevism was a Jewish plot, though changed his mind. He republished the works of Yockey in his bulletin. The promotion of Yockey issue brought him into conflict with fellow neo-Nazi leader George Lincoln Rockwell, who used the label "communist" to discredit Madole and his followers. Madole and the NRP considered themselves more "sophisticated" in their racism than Rockwell and his ANP. Madole was an early Holocaust denier, probably influenced by information from a 1954 pamphlet, The Jewish War against the German People, that Weiss had told him about. At a 1955 meeting, Madole said:

All reports about the fate of the six million Jews in Europe are false, because the whole obnoxious lot of them can be seen any day in the garment center in New York City.

Madole wrote that the Aryans originated in the Garden of Eden located in North America. He also believed that America was the "new Atlantis" and "the cradle of a new God like race". He argued for the reorganization of American race among Hindu lines, but simultaneously made the NRP ally with the Greenshirts, who were pro-Islam. Among his contacts were occultists, satanists, esotericists and witches, including Anton LaVey. He and LaVey formed an alliance between the NRP and the Church of Satan. He was a frequent writer to the letters to the editor section of the neopagan magazine Green Egg. Even after splitting with LaVey, Madole continued to espouse occult and Satanic neo-Nazi ideas, such as "New Atlantis" idea of Aryan occultism.

His writings continue to influence some neo-Nazis, and John Michael Greer noted him as a pivotal figure in the development of esoteric neo-Nazism. Nicholas Goodrick-Clarke wrote that the 1960s "contacts between Madole's occult fascism and satanism anticipated the pagan alliances of neo-Nazis and satanists in the 1990s". Scholar Jeffrey Kaplan found his most significant legacy to be in his forging of connections between neo-Nazism and occult and Satanist ideology; he argued that adherents of neo-Nazi mysticism "may well be dubbed the 'children of Madole'".
