= Christian fascism =

Type of fascist philosophy

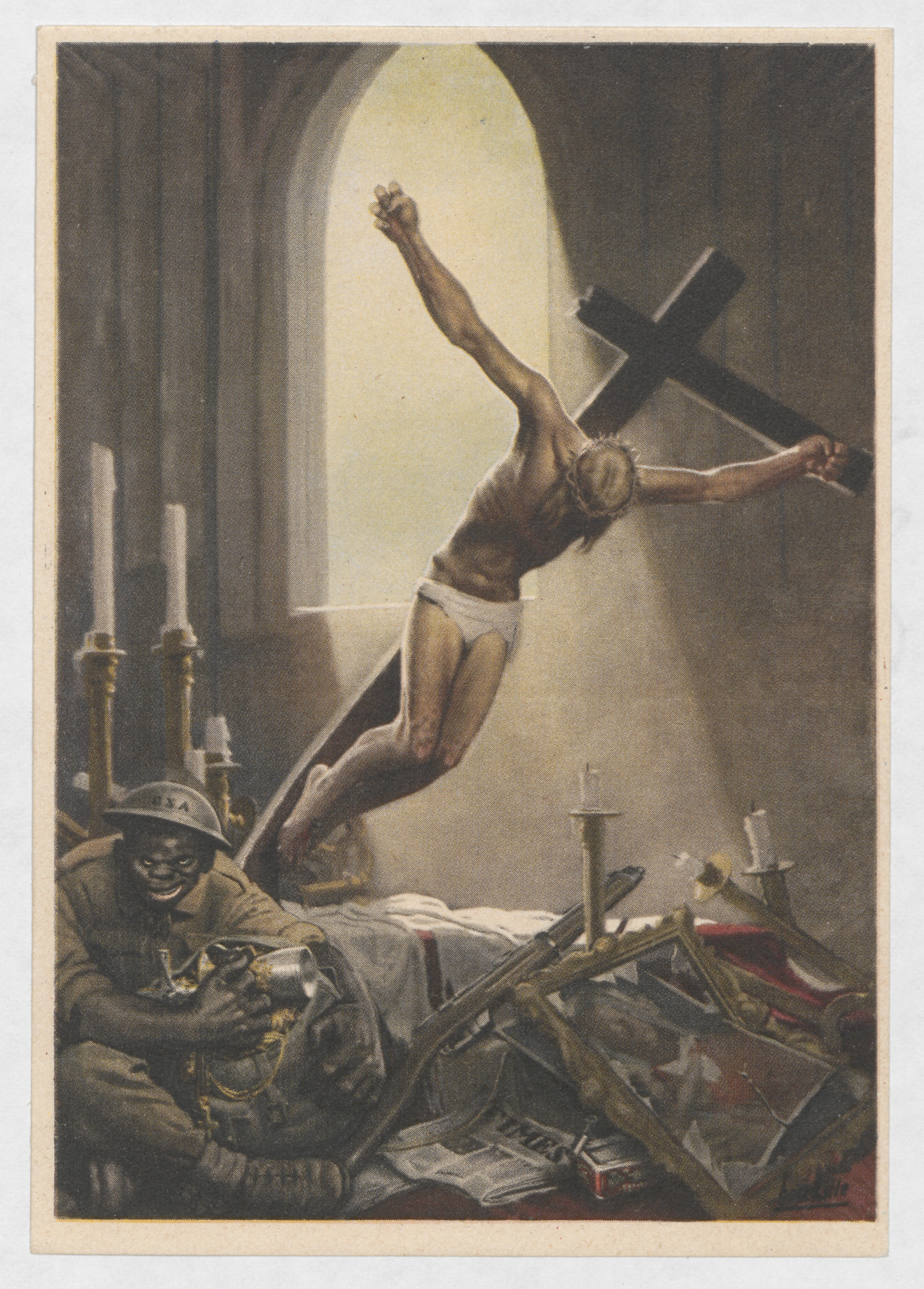
Italian World War II-era poster by fascist Gino Boccasile, depicting an African-American soldier pillaging a church

Christian fascism is a religious and political philosophy that blends Christianity with fascism, endorsing violence, authoritarian rule and the regeneration of society on the basis of the Bible and its teachings. Christian fascists advocate for the establishment of the authority of religion and morals in personal, social, and political life of the people of a nation. A nationalist movement, it asserts the superiority of a specific culture, nation or ethnic group as possessing a status of chosen people. Christian fascism is generally characterized by its support for a dictatorial leadership and the subordination of the individual to the power of the state, seen as the main enforcer of biblical law.

Christian fascism as a political current emerged in the early 20th century in Europe, particularly in the interwar period. Though the core fascist movements in Europe were anticlerical and fundamentally even anti-religious, other Christian-based fascist groups also emerged around the continent during the same period, such as the Iron Guard in Romania, whose ideology incorporated elements of religious mysticism and the Orthodox Church's doctrine; or Catholic-based fascist organizations including the Ustaše in Croatia, the Arrow Cross in Hungary and the Hlinka Guard in Slovakia. In the United States, religiosity played a larger role in the development of a regional fascist movement in contrast with most of its European counterparts, with William Dudley Pelley's Silver Legion representing such ideology.

The term Christofascism is a neologism which liberation theologian Dorothee Sölle coined in 1970 to designate one strand of Christian fascism prominent in the United States.

== History ==
=== United States ===
The earlier manifestations of fascism in the United States were explicitly Christian in nature, with religiosity composing a central component of the ideology. In contrast with its European counterparts, religious doctrine—particularly strands of Protestantism—played a larger role in the doctrinal development of American fascism. By the early 1930s, during the Great Depression, the first explicitly Christian fascist influence in the United States manifested through the ideas of fundamentalist preachers Gerald L. K. Smith and Gerald B. Winrod, who conceived a fascist ideology through the fusing of national and Christian symbols. By this era, most fascist organizations in the United States justified their existence by their desire to regenerate the nation into a Christian society. In 1933, the philosopher William Dudley Pelley founded the Silver Legion of America, known as the Silver Shirts due to their silver attire modelled after Hitler's Sturmabteilung (colloquially called Brownshirts), to promote Christian fascism. Pelley's ideas and commentary, particularly his antisemitic rantings, attracted large numbers of former Klansmen and other White supremacists nationwide. By 1936, Pelley's broad support lead him to run for the presidential election, though he only managed to get a small portion the vote. Nonetheless, Pelley maintained some support through the later years of the decade, principally from working-class and rural districts. In 1942, during World War II, Pelley was convicted on dubious grounds of sedition, being imprisoned until 1950.

Two years after the end of the War, in 1947, Smith founded the Christian Nationalist Crusade, whose magazine was The Cross and the Flag. A Christian nationalist group, it proclaimed that "Christian character is the basis of all real Americanism." Smith had already played a central role in the development of Christian Identity during the 1930s and 40s. By the late 1950s, some of those radical Christians had drifted to the right-wing, anti-communist John Birch Society, whose policy positions and rhetoric have greatly influenced modern dominionists. During the 1960s, Identity leader William Potter Gale and Mike Beach, a former Silver Shirt militant, established the Posse Comitatus movement, which advocated for Christian fascism and the formation of citizen militias through the 70s and 80s. The 1980s saw the founding of the Council for National Policy and Moral Majority, two organizations which carried on the tradition, while the patriot and militia movements represented efforts to mainstream the philosophy in the 1990s. Some historians contend the presence of a Christian proto-fascism in the antebellum United States.

Incidents of anti-abortion violence, including the Centennial Olympic Park bombing and Birmingham bombings committed by Eric Rudolph and the assassination of George Tiller at his Wichita, Kansas, church in 2009, have also been considered acts which were motivated by Christofascism.

== Reception ==
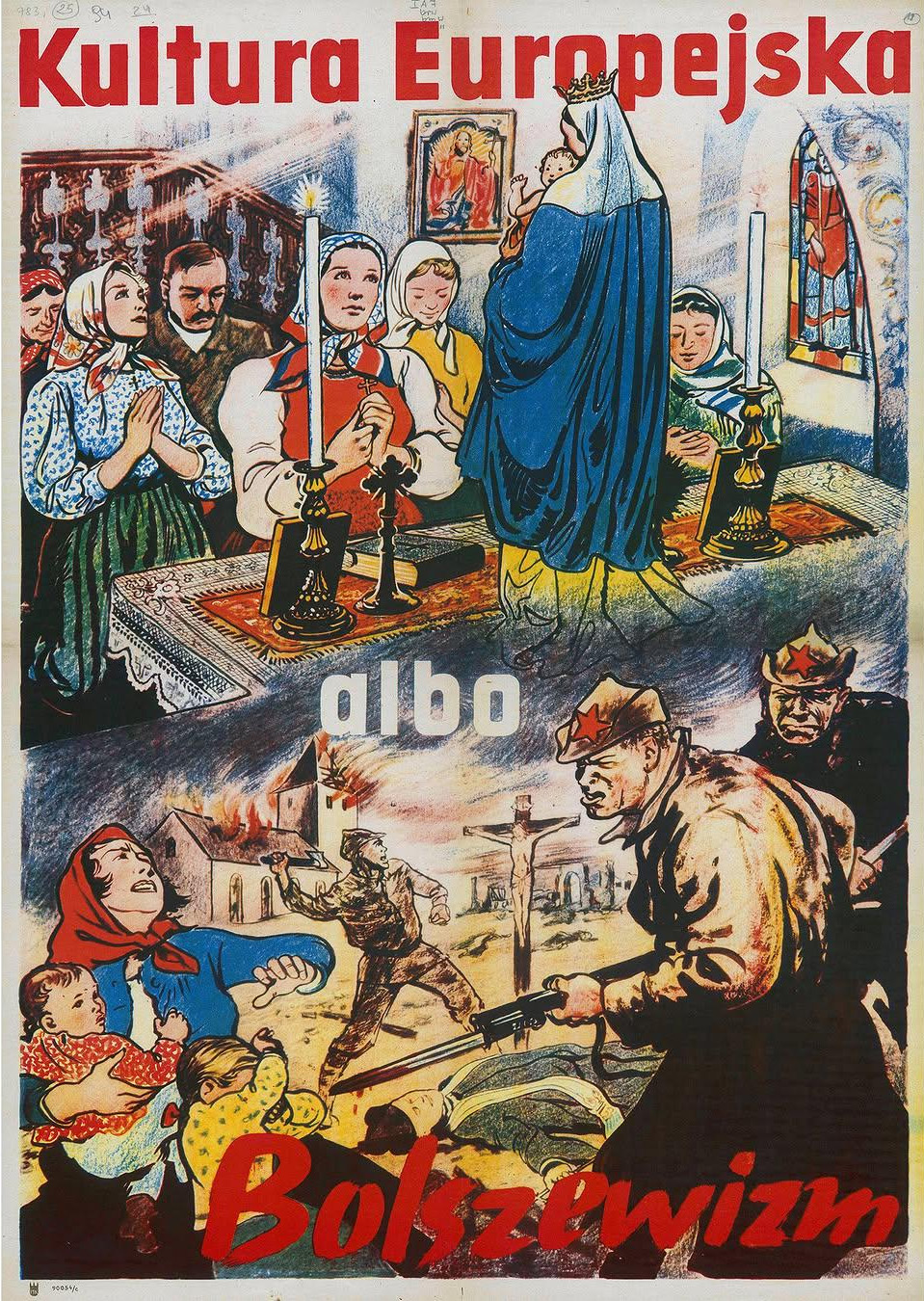
Nazi propaganda poster in Polish contrasting Christian European culture with Bolshevism

=== Interpretation of Sölle ===
Tom F. Driver, the Paul Tillich Professor Emeritus at Union Theological Seminary, expressed concern "that the worship of God in Christ not divide Christian from Jew, man from woman, clergy from laity, white from black, or rich from poor". To him, Christianity is in constant danger of Christofascism. He stated that "[w]e fear christofascism, which we see as the political direction of all attempts to place Christ at the center of social life and history" and that "[m]uch of the churches' teaching about Christ has turned into something that is dictatorial in its heart and is preparing society for an American fascism".

Christofascism "disposed or allowed Christians, to impose themselves not only upon other religions but other cultures, and political parties which do not march under the banner of the final, normative, victorious Christ" – as Paul F. Knitter describes Sölle's view.

=== Christomonism ===
Douglas John Hall, Professor of Christian Theology at McGill University, relates Sölle's concept of Christofascism to Christomonism, which inevitably ends in religious triumphalism and exclusivity. Hall noted Sölle's observation of American fundamentalist Christianity, which led him to conclude that Christomonism easily leads to Christofascism and that violence is never far away from militant Christomonism. (Christomonism worships one divine person, Jesus, rather than the Trinity.)

Hall states that the over-divinized ("high") Christology of Christendom is demonstrated to be wrong by its "almost unrelieved anti-Judaism". He suggests that the best way to guard against that is for Christians not to neglect the humanity of Jesus in favour of his divinity, and remind themselves that Jesus was also a Jewish human being.

=== Criticism of the use of the term ===
Anti-war and human rights activist George Hunsinger, director of the Centre for Barth Studies at Princeton Theological Seminary, regards the very accusation of "fascism" as a sophisticated theological attack on the Christian biblical depiction of Jesus. He believes that the view of Jesus, which is called Christofascist, is, in fact, the real "Jesus Christ as he is depicted in Scripture". Hunsinger contrasts his preferred understanding of Jesus with the "nonnormative Christology" that self-proclaimed anti-Christofascists offer as an alternative, which he criticizes as extreme relativism that reduces Jesus to "an object of mere personal preference and cultural location". Hunsinger believes that this relativism may contribute to the same problems that Karl Barth saw in Germany's Christian church during the previous century.

The strife of the medieval Hussite Wars has led some contemporary historians to condemn the Hussites' methods as fascist.

Usage of the term Christofascism caused controversy in 2007, when Melissa McEwan, a campaign blogger for the presidential candidate John Edwards, referred to religious conservatives as "Christofascists" on her personal blog.

== See also ==
- Antisemitism in Christianity
- Christian fundamentalism
- Christian Identity
- Christian nationalism
- Christian supremacy
- Christian terrorism
- Christian corporatism
- Clerical fascism
- Charles Coughlin
- Far-right politics
- Far-right subcultures
- Hindu terrorism
  - Violence against Christians in India
  - Violence against Muslims in independent India
- Hindutva
- Alois Hudal
- Islamofascism
- Kahanism
- Kinism
- Ku Klux Klan
- National Catholicism
- PJ Media
- Positive Christianity
- Religious antisemitism
- Religious nationalism
- Religious terrorism
- Right-wing politics
- Right-wing populism
- Right-wing terrorism
- Stochastic terrorism
- Donald Trump and fascism

=== European and American movements since World War II ===
- FET y de las JONS
- German Christians
- Iron Guard
- National-Christian Defense League
- Patriotic People's Movement
- Rexism
- Silver Legion of America
- Ustaše

== Sources ==
- Block, Jimmy (27 February 2017). Donald Trump: A fascist president with Christian support? (Bachelor's thesis). Linnaeus University.
- Hall, Douglas John (2004). "The Identity of Jesus in a Pluralistic World". Archived from the original (Microsoft Word) on February 28, 2008.
- ——— (November 6, 1999). "Confessing Christ in a Post-Christendom Context". 1999 Covenant Conference, Network of Presbyterians. Atlanta, Georgia: Religion Online. Archived from the original on August 23, 2007.
- Hedges, Chris (2008). American Fascists: The Christian Right and the War on America. Simon & Schuster. p. 140. ISBN 978-0-7432-8446-2.
- Hoffman, John Charles (1986). Law, Freedom, and Story: The Role of Narrative in Therapy, Society, and Faith. Wilfrid Laurier University Press. ISBN 0-88920-185-4.
- Hoppes, Karen E. (1983). An Investigation of the Nazi-Fascist Spectrum in the Pacific Northwest: 1924-1941. Western Oregon State College (Master's thesis). Oregon.
- Payne, Stanley G. (2004). A history of fascism, 1914-1945 (Reprint ed.). London New York: Routledge. ISBN 1-85728-595-6.
- Rhee, Helen (2005). "Superiority of Christian Monotheism". Early Christian Literature: Christ and Culture in the Second and Third Centuries. Routledge. p. 80. ISBN 0-415-35487-0.
- Neiwert, David A. (May 1, 2009). The Eliminationists: how hate talk radicalized the American right. PoliPoint Press. ISBN 978-0-9815769-8-5.
- Nakagawa, Scot (September 11, 2025). Calling People of Faith The Time to Act is Now (PDF) (Speech). Interfaith Alliance.
- Oberländer, Erwin (1966). "The All-Russian Fascist Party". Journal of Contemporary History. 1 (1): 158–173. ISSN 0022-0094.
- Zerbisias, Antonia (June 2, 2009). "Doctor's killing is domestic terrorism". The Star.
