= National Socialist League =

National Socialist League may refer to:

- National Socialist League (United Kingdom)
- National Socialist League (United States)
- National Socialist League of the Reich for Physical Exercise

== See also ==
- National Socialist Party (UK)
