= Christomonism =

Nontrinitarian viewpoint within Christianity

Christomonism is a Christocentric viewpoint within Christianity that accepts only one divine person, Jesus Christ, rather than the Holy Trinity.

As a form of nontrinitarianism, belief in Christomonism is not part of mainstream Christianity, which follows the rulings of the ecumenical councils, including the First Council of Nicaea and First Council of Constantinople, which established Trinitarianism as part of mainstream Christian belief.

== History ==
Paul Althaus used the term Christomonism to criticise Karl Barth and his theology.

== Criticism ==
Douglas John Hall has related Christomonism to Dorothee Sölle's concept of Christofascism. He states that the over-divinized ("high") Christology of Christendom is demonstrated to be wrong by its "almost unrelieved anti-Judaism".

== See also ==
- Oneness Pentecostalism – Nontrinitarian religious movement
- Adoptionism
