= VEH =

VEH, Veh, or Veh. may refer to:

- Armin Veh, German football manager
- Russell Veh (1950–1995), American neo-Nazi
- Vectored Exception Handling (VEH), one of the Microsoft systems for exception handling
- Ve (Arabic), a character of the Arabic alphabet
- An abbreviation for vehicle
- An abbreviation for Vlaamse Energieholding
