= Gerald Burton Winrod =

American political activist (1900–1957)

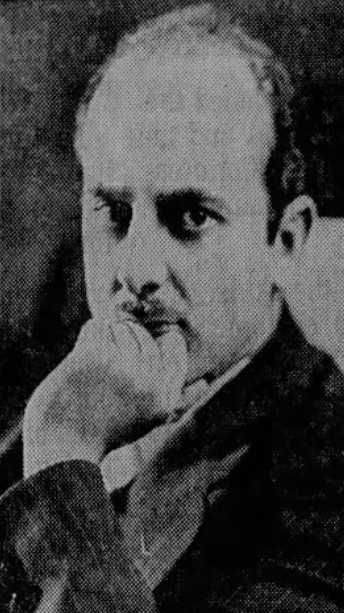
- Winrod in a 1930s photo
- Born: March 7, 1900; Wichita, Kansas, U.S.
- Died: November 11, 1957 (aged 57); Wichita, Kansas, U.S.
- Occupation: Preacher
- Children: Gordon Winrod
- Parent(s): Mable E. (1881–1971); John W. Winrod (1873–1945)

Gerald Burton Winrod (March 7, 1900 – November 11, 1957) was a self-educated fundamentalist American evangelist, author, and political activist. He was considered to be the Protestant counterpart to Father Charles Coughlin.

Winrod was a promoter of Christian Identity, with an impact on the early adoption of Identity by Wesley Swift. He was known to have strongly antisemitic views, which, along with his sympathies towards Nazi Germany in the 1930s, earned him the nickname "the Jayhawk Nazi".

During World War II, Winrod was charged with sedition. He was never convicted, as the judge died during the trial.

== Biography ==
He was born on March 7, 1900, to Mable E. (1881–1971), originally from Illinois, and John W. Winrod (1873–1945), originally from Missouri. His father, John, was a former bartender whose saloon was attacked by Carrie Nation.

In 1918, he was the chief clerk at the Kansas Gas and Electric Company in El Dorado, Kansas. By 1925, he formed the Defenders of the Christian Faith, a fundamentalist Christian-fascist organization that opposed teaching evolution in public schools, supported Prohibition, opposed homosexuality, and expressed support for racial segregation. Defenders of the Christian Faith existed in Kansas at least up to 1980, though many offshoots in Topeka, Kansas, Lawrence, Kansas, and Kansas City were expected to exist.

Winrod professed strongly antisemitic views, earning him the nickname "The Jayhawk Nazi" ("Jayhawk" being a nickname for a person from Kansas). Winrod offered the following defense of his views in the introduction to his book The Truth About the Protocols which proclaimed the veracity of The Protocols of the Elders of Zion:

After observing the title of this book, some will accuse me of being anti-Semitic. If by this they mean that I am opposed to the Jews as a race or as a religion, I deny the allegation. But if they mean that I am opposed to a coterie of international Jewish bankers ruling the Gentile world by the power of gold, if they mean that I am opposed to international Jewish Communism, then I plead guilty to the charge.

Winrod believed the United States to be the chosen land of God and, when the Great Depression struck, publicly stated that it was the work of Satan. He believed Franklin D. Roosevelt was a "devil" linked with the Jewish-Communist conspiracy, that the New Deal was a Jewish plot predicted by the Protocols, and that Hitler would save Europe from Communism. Winrod wrote in his book The Jewish Assault on Christianity, published in 1935 by a publishing company in Topeka, Kansas:

The same forces which crucified Christ nineteen hundred years ago are today trying to crucify His Church. Many Christian leaders have not yet realized it, but Christianity is in the grip of a life and death struggle at the present time. International Jewish Communism, which has already undermined all nations, firmly expects to exterminate all Christians. What the Cause of Christ has endured in Russia the past eighteen years, surpasses its suffering at the hands of bloody Nero. One of the purposes of the present treatise is to show that this conspiracy is not of recent origin.

The book was met with positive reception by many Christians at the time. Winrod would go on to say that he believed Jews were damned to hell, and that Jesus Christ condemned them in the Bible. He expanded upon these views, stating the following:

Will the Church be able to demonstrate sufficient power to triumph over its foes in the present crisis, or has it become so weakened by apostasy and pernicious teachings that it will have to be drenched in its own blood before it can be brought to its senses? Jesus knew better than anyone else the unspeakable crimes of which [the Jews] are capable. The Jesus of the twenty-third chapter of Matthew, is not the quiet, reticent Jesus of modern literature and the fashionable pulpit. The Jesus, whose righteous indignation is here asserted, is a man of words and action, a man in the act of pronouncing eight woes upon the Jewish leaders and finally condemning them to the damnation of hell.

Winrod spread these views through his newspaper, The Defender, which by 1937 achieved a 100,000 monthly circulation. Some of the articles reproduced materials from the pro-Nazi and virulently antisemitic international Welt-Dienst/World-Service/Service Mondial news agency founded in 1933 by Ulrich Fleischhauer.

Winrod ran for a seat in the U.S. Senate during the 1938 elections, but was defeated in the Republican primary when a popular former governor Clyde M. Reed was lured from retirement by the party establishment to run against him. With 21.4% of the vote, Winrod was a distant third after Reed and Dallas Knapp of Coffeyville, Kansas, winning only 6 of 105 counties, all of which had been heavily associated with the Ku Klux Klan in the 1920s.

Winrod developed a strong following among German-speaking Kansas Mennonites who identified with his religious, anti-World War II, and pro-Germany views. The Defender was printed by Mennonite-owned Herald Publishing Company of Newton, Kansas from 1931 to 1942. Winrod found support in Bethel College and Tabor College and from editors of local Mennonite papers, and some Mennonite precincts voted predominantly for Winrod in the 1938 Senate primary.

According to the 1941 Theologue, the yearbook of Practical Bible Training School (now Davis College) located outside Binghamton, New York, Winrod was a member of the school's administration. No details are given as to what Winrod's duties were. In 1942, the federal government indicted Winrod for sedition, alleging conspiracy against the U.S. government. The political aspect in attempting to suppress free speech troubled civil libertarians in what critics derided as the Great Sedition Trial. The death of the judge ended the trial in 1944. The government decided not to renew the prosecution, so Winrod and his fellow defendants were freed.

Winrod, a lifelong proponent of faith healing who refused to see a physician, died of pneumonia on November 11, 1957, in Wichita, Kansas. He was buried in that city's White Chapel Memorial Gardens.

== Family ==
In 1940, Winrod's wife sued for divorce. Their son Gordon (1926–2018) was a Christian Identity minister who was arrested for kidnapping in 2000.
