= Russell Veh =

American neo-Nazi (1950–1995)

- Veh in 1970
- Born: Russell Raymond Veh; July 29, 1950; Virginia, U.S.
- Died: August 8, 1995 (aged 45); Las Vegas, Nevada, U.S.
- Other name: Russell R. Patton
- Occupations: Writer, magazine editor, publisher
- Years active: 1970–1995
- Organization: National Socialist League
- Movement: Neo-Nazism

Russell Raymond Veh (July 29, 1950 – August 8, 1995) was an American neo-Nazi political activist, writer, and publisher. Known for his open homosexuality, Veh was a controversial figure in the neo-Nazi movement and in the gay community. From the early 1970s until his death in 1995, Veh edited and distributed neo-Nazi and racist propaganda books, periodicals, and films around the world by mail; by the 1990s, he was one of the largest distributors of white supremacist material in the United States. He edited and wrote for a number of white supremacist magazines through his life, including the periodicals Race & Nation, NS Mobilizer, Christian Advocate, and White Power.

In the late 1960s and early 1970s, Veh was repeatedly arrested and convicted in connection with his distribution of white supremacist materials in Toledo, Ohio. In 1970, he founded the Ohio White Nationalist Party, later renamed the American White Nationalist Party. He also led the Anglo-Saxon Christian Crusade. In 1972, he was convicted of mail fraud and moved to California the next year. There, Veh took over the openly gay neo-Nazi organization the National Socialist League (NSL) from 1974 until its dissolution in 1985. Veh operated the neo-Nazi publishing organization World Service until his death, distributing white supremacist media nationally.

== Early life ==
Veh in 1967

Russell Raymond Veh was born on July 29, 1950, in Virginia. His mother was named Betty McClellan. She later married, and Veh's stepfather abused him. Veh had a half brother. Veh later moved to Ohio, where he was raised, initially in Sylvania, then later Toledo. When Veh was a teenager, he ran away from home due to family problems, and lived in Detroit, Michigan. In November 1968, when Veh was in Michigan, his mother died in Knoxville, Tennessee. Veh's stepfather killed himself in the late 1960s.

He attended Burnham Junior High School. Veh was a pamphleteer for the student activist organization Students for a Democratic Society as a teenager. He was involved with the movement against the Vietnam war. He credited his political shift to increasing disillusionment with the anti-war movement, which he came to believe was Marxist, then became a George Wallace supporter, then a neo-Nazi. He dropped out of high school. In 1971 he was attending adult night school classes at Waite High School. In later years Veh was frequently vague about his upbringing.

== White supremacy ==
=== Activities in Toledo and the American White Nationalist Party ===
By 1971, Veh was spending time on street corners in Toledo passing out white supremacist leaflets. Veh was arrested several times in Toledo in connection with his propagandizing. In 1969, aged 18, he was arrested for distributing handbills that were "advocating white power, soliciting memberships in the White Persons Party, and generally attacking the Negro race, all without first having obtained a license". Veh represented himself and was convicted August 8, 1969; he was fined $100. He sued, seeking a new trial, supported by lawyers from the American Civil Liberties Union (ACLU); the ACLU attorneys said that there were issues with the legal proceedings and noted that no license for handbill distribution even existed, and so Veh could not have obtained one. The conviction was overturned by the Sixth District Court of Appeals.

In his early years, Veh operated a number of neo-Nazi "organizations" (of which was usually both leader and the only participant). As part of these operations he ran several journals. In July 1970, Veh founded the Ohio White Nationalist Party based in Toledo. In 1971, he renamed it the American White Nationalist Party (AWNP). It published the newsletter White Power, edited and mostly written by Veh, subtitled The Voice of White America. One issue contained a drawing of Veh being crucified. The AWNP was variously self described as either a group for white Christians or a "white racist" group. The AWNP was used by Veh to spread white supremacist materials, and was initially a one man group. Veh claimed in January 1971 they had 100 people paying dues and subscribers to their newsletter; in October he claimed they had 230 members and their newsletter had a few hundred subscribers. Veh was still solely responsible for all group activity. By 1972, the brothers John Gerhardt and Edward Gerhardt had joined him, as the AWNP's national secretary and "art director", respectively, alongside Veh as national director.

Veh in 1971

He appeared a number of times on local radio programs in the early 1970s discussing his views and political activities, including on WTTO, WBGU FM, and WRIF in Detroit, representing the American White Nationalist Party. In August 1971 he ran as a write-in candidate for the Toledo city council, running as "the white people's candidate". Ultimately, he got 13 votes; in September, he sued the Lucas County board of elections to recover his $39 in filing fees, claiming the voting process had been carried out improperly. The lawsuit was dismissed the next month as filing fees are non-refundable under Ohio law; in protest of this decision Veh refused to indicate his campaign expenses as was legally required. In October 1971, he appeared at the Bowling Green State University (BGSU) campus, passing out white supremacist materials and trying to recruit. He also went to the Toledo University campus and debated with a group of black power advocates.

In 1972, Veh declared he would run as a write-in candidate for president of the United States on the ticket of the American Independent Party. John Gerhardt was claimed as his running mate. As Veh was 21 years old, and presidential candidates must be 35, he was not legally eligible; he did not acknowledge this. On January 20, 1972, he gave a speech, "A View From the Right", at BGSU to an audience of 400. The speech was sponsored by the historical honor society Phi Alpha Theta. During the speech, he discussed his political views and political positions; several listeners walked out of the speech and Veh was frequently interrupted by the audience; John Gerhardt also spoke. Afterwards, Veh was escorted out by campus security.

==== Mail fraud and police assault ====
In April 1971, Veh was arrested again for placing copies of a white supremacist newsletter on cars; he was charged with littering and trespassing. A week later, unrelated to that case, Veh was charged in April 1971 for federal mail fraud. Veh was indicted in July of two counts of "using the U.S. mail service in a scheme to defraud two publishing companies". As part of an "ill-conceived plot", Veh had, in 1970, ordered books through the mail from several companies and then refused to pay for them, including from the New York City-based Book of the Month Club. He also subscribed to the magazine The New Republic under a fake name.

With the mail fraud case pending, in March 1972, Veh was arrested alongside the Gerhardts after passing out their White Power newsletter at Woodward High School; Veh also got into a fight with a police officer at the scene. Veh was charged with abusing a policeman, assault and battery on a policeman, three counts of distributing handbills on cars without consent, and two counts of violating the safe-schools ordinance. The Gerhardts received lesser charges; Veh's bond was set at $13,000, which was not posted. Less than a week later, Veh pleaded guilty and was convicted; the charge of abusing a policeman was dismissed while the safe-schools ordinance charge was referred elsewhere. Veh was sentenced to 90 days in jail and fined $30. While jailed he was ordered to undergo psychiatric testing in connection with the mail fraud case. He pleaded guilty to the mail fraud charge in August 1972. That month he was convicted and received three years of probation.

=== Anglo-Saxon Christian Crusade ===
First page of the fourth issue of Christian Advocate, edited by Veh

After the mail fraud conviction, Veh established the Anglo-Saxon Christian Crusade, another white supremacist group. Veh styled himself as "pastor-director" of the organization. It was incorporated as a non-profit in Toledo in November 1972 by Veh and Connie and Thomas Womack. Veh was listed as agent.

Also in November, it established a periodical, published in Toledo, titled Christian Advocate. It styled itself as being primarily anticommunist, with one issue branding itself as "The Nation's Fastest Growing Anti-Communist Paper", but primarily focused on antisemitism and other racial topics, including some reprinted articles as well as new ones. The organization also sold antisemitic materials, including Francis Parker Yockey's Imperium and "The Truth About the Protocols" by Gordon Winrod.

In mid-1973, Veh moved to Los Angeles, California. Christian Advocate continued to be published for a time in Hollywood. The AWNP was taken up by the Gerhardts (John and Edward) and continued its activities without him. Some years later, the brothers were convicted of plotting to bomb a school over court ordered busing, and, after their convictions, prison sentences, and a legal battle, the group dissolved.

=== National Socialist League ===
Cover of the 3–4 issue of the National Socialist League magazine, initially titled NS Kampfruf

After he ceased involvement in the AWNP, Veh saw an ad in The Advocate that advocated joining the National Socialist League (NSL), a openly pro-gay neo-Nazi group. The group was primarily targeted at gay men, though straight men were allowed to join. It was founded by several formal members of the National Socialist White People's Party (NSWPP). The group was founded by Jim Cherry, but Veh quickly took it over after he joined. He led the group for most of its existence, from 1974 on, out of Echo Park. While the American neo-Nazi movement had numerous gay participants, to the chagrin of most neo-Nazis, this was something of an open secret, and until the NSL openly gay neo-Nazism did not exist. Members of the NSL self described as "Gay Nazis"; John George and Laird Wilcox described the NSL as "the United States's only homophile neo-Nazi group".

The NSL had chapters across California and across America. They organized screenings of Nazi films, mailed and produced literature, and tried to get involved in gay activism. They had a publishing arm, World Service, directed by Veh. Veh also used the pseudonym Russell R. Patton. Veh planned to have the NSL members march in the 1977 Christopher Street West pride parade in Nazi uniform, suing for their right to do so. This resulted in increased media interest and they used it to recruit, though Veh ultimately did not go through with it. Veh managed to get the party advertised in the historically gay Bay Area Reporter newspaper and the gay leather magazine Drummer. Veh and his party distributed membership applications declaring NSL's "determination to seek sexual, social, and political freedom" for Aryans. Veh was interviewed widely in mainstream and gay press, which was frequently discussed as a debate on the political openness of the gay community. Jeffrey Kaplan said the mainstream news coverage of Veh "called into question how far newspapers would go to find ever-more-exotic filler for an otherwise slow news day".

In March 1974, the NSL launched a magazine, the NS Kampfruf, which was soon renamed NS Mobilizer. It was edited by Veh, and published bimonthly. Targeted at gay Nazis, scholar Jeffrey Kaplan described this magazine as, even for a neo-Nazi magazine, "exceedingly strange". Its first issue cover featured a crucified Richard Nixon, and it featured provocative images of scantily clad SS soldiers with swastikas covering their genitals to emphasize the "sexual trip" of Nazism. Issues also highlighted connections between Nazism and homosexuality. Later issues were even more explicitly gay and grew more extreme over time, incorporating sadomasochism and leather fetishism. Veh described the paper's editorial stance as "unabashedly pro-White and anti-Semitic".

1974 advertisement for the National Socialist League in the gay newspaper Bay Area Reporter

Other neo-Nazis attacked Veh for being gay, and his activities further fueled the constant disputes between neo-Nazis over homosexuality within their ranks. His magazine was not widely liked among the neo-Nazi movement and was used as ammunition in the 1976 Deguello Report, a conspiratorial document that alleges that most major members of the far-right were Jewish, communists, or gay. However, his access to hard to find neo-Nazi media made it so other neo-Nazis could not totally disregard him and his magazine. Thus, "the American National Socialist community was treated to ads that ran heavily into leather fetishism".

Neo-Nazi groups that criticized Veh included the World Union of National Socialists (WUNS) and the National Socialist Liberation Front (NSLF). The NSLF, a militant neo-Nazi group, openly disavowed Veh and the NSL under its original leader, Joseph Tommasi. However, after Tommasi's murder in 1975, his successors were more ambivalent about Veh and the NSL in private. David Rust, one of Tommasi's successors, said he "admire[d] their honesty and courage to bear both crosses, National Socialism and homosexuality", as did James Mason, as long as the gay neo-Nazis were masculine in presentation. The later NSLF tolerated Veh and the NSL, primarily due to Veh's access to hard to find neo-Nazi magazines. Mason in particular grew to like Veh, promoted him, and said in 1983 that though he detested the personal ads in the NS Mobilizer (which were later removed), Veh's sexuality was "none of my damn business and I frankly couldn't care less."

The NSL was not successful in Los Angeles. In 1980, their headquarters were attacked and they were ran out of Echo Park, leading them to move locations to an undisclosed location in the city's north. In 1982, Veh moved to San Diego, hoping the NSL would have better success there. The NSL ceased in San Diego in 1985, though Veh claimed for several years that the group was still around.

=== World Service and death ===
After the NSL ceased, Veh continued World Service, previously the publishing arm of the NSL, as its own organization based in San Diego. The name World Service comes from a 1930s German news agency that promoted antisemitism internationally. This version of World Service was a one man mail order business/mailing list/ publishing house selling a variety of white supremacist books and films. It operated the World Service FIlm League and the World Service Library. Life memberships to World Service were sold for $100, yearly for $25, with discounts for veterans and students. His catalogs were mailed nationally, and he also operated booths at swap shops in Southern California. He flew a Confederate flag over his tables. For a period in 1986 he was involved in an organization called the Praying People's Party, and distributed their literature at polling booths.

Veh's World Service sold and rented a vast array of white supremacist materials, including books, magazines, films, and videos. This included Nazi films, including Nazi propaganda films, like The Eternal Jew, Jud Süß, and Triumph of the Will. He also sold the American white supremacist film The Birth of a Nation and videos that sought to debunk the Holocaust. Their book division sold a number of far-right and Holocaust denial books, including the books White Power by George Lincoln Rockwell, Hitler's Mein Kampf, the antisemitic tract The Protocols of the Elders of Zion, The Hoax of the Twentieth Century, The Plot Against Christianity, and The International Jew. NS Mobilizer continued being published by World Service but was renamed Race & Nation, a quarterly magazine, still edited by Veh. With the name change it dropped the focus on homosexuality.

By 1990, Veh was "one of the largest purveyors of white supremacist information in the country." He also sold materials internationally; he estimated that he had sold hundreds of thousands of items by 1990. The Anti-Defamation League (ADL) monitored him and described him as a leading distributor of white supremacist materials; he was included in a 1988 ADL manual as one of the major antisemites in the nation. The scholar Paul Devendittis credited Veh's activities with keeping fascism alive in America. At the same time, Veh tried to keep a lower profile in his real life activities. The ADL said that Veh served as part of the "underground" of the white supremacist movement, rather than its forefront like white supremacist skinheads.

As the World Service, it was claimed to have no ties to any neo-Nazi organizations. World Service was promoted by James Mason, a neo-Nazi who was then authoring a newsletter, Siege. Mason announced an intent to distribute videotapes to subscribers of his newsletter with World Service, though this may not have ended up happening. In February 1986, Veh attended a conference of the Holocaust denial organization the Institute for Historical Review, though stayed on the outskirts of the event. World Service continued to be active into the 1990s. Veh later moved to Las Vegas, Nevada. Veh died on August 8, 1995, in Las Vegas.

== Views ==
An admirer of Adolf Hitler and George Lincoln Rockwell, the founder of the neo-Nazi American Nazi Party, Veh was antisemitic. He claimed the country was controlled by black people and Jews. Veh described the NSL as an organization for "white sexual nonconformists", rather than homosexuals. In a response to a 1975 review of the Mobilizer, which described them as "homosexual", Veh said they were, rather, "sexual nonconformists", as "we have a few real bisexuals and even a heterosexual among our members." He claimed that gay man were a benefit to white supremacy for eugenic purposes, writing: "We need homosexuals today to keep the population down. In fact, we could use maybe twice as many more. Because we're not reproducing mongrels, or little halfbreed kids, or racial rejects [...]".

He adhered to white supremacy, saying that white people were "masters of the universe since time began" and that "all great civilizations and powers were white". The NSL claimed that homophobia was a Jewish/Communist plot to distract from race. In the 1970s, he advocated against the women's rights movement, denying women were oppressed. He criticized the Vietnam War as being done for business interests and not against communism, and blamed Jews for communism. He advocated racial segregation and forcibly deporting all black people to Africa. In a 1976 interview he denied the Holocaust. While claiming he would run for president in 1972 he advocated abolishing the income tax and lowering all city and state taxes.

Veh criticized a Christian minister who advocated for gay rights, saying that he "bless[es] the leading public role of low-comedy drag queens and glitterfreak mulattoes, who have stolen the 'image' of the American sexual non-conformist". He said that the NSL was for far-right gay men who could not find a place in any other organization. Asked about the prevalence of fetishists within the organization, he said the NSL was not a fetishist organization but some individuals were uniform fetishists. He argued that those who genuinely have a uniform fetish would be far-right. He described the NSL as a "pressure group" against the "Bolsheviks" in the gay community. He wrote that,

freedom for all responsible citizens cannot be achieved without a unity of purpose, self discipline, and individual dignity - qualities to be realized only in a self-aware White society; and that, to attain his share of freedom, the sexual nonconformist must shed the image of freak, firebrand, and street faggot for that of the responsible fellow citizen.

In the 1990s, under World Service, Veh changed course from open neo-Nazism and denied that he was a Nazi. He said "there is a lot of money in video, and I do a beautiful job" and that he was "advocating common sense". In the same interview he alleged that Anne Frank's diary was a hoax, and continued to deny the Holocaust. He said he was moving towards "David Duke Republicanism". He criticized skinhead white supremacists, particularly Tom Metzger, and his followers, saying "never read a Nazi book in their lives" and "don't know what the white supremacist movement is even about". He said he was aware that there was no chance his ideas would ever come to power.

In a 1975 interview with Gay Scene NYC, Veh derided "street faggots" and feminity among gay men, and differentiated between masculine gay men and "swishes, transsexuals, drag queens, street hippies, long hairs, gay pride parades, pickets, and demonstration rallies." He wrote that this gave the "legitimate" gay community a bad name. Scholar Blu Bluchanan wrote that "Veh links the notion of the 'street faggot' to non-white, 'impure' racial performance". According to Emma Bianco, Veh and the other members of the NSL presented themselves as "suave—but capable—macho men", in contrast with the approach of other paramilitary groups towards gay men.
