= National Socialist League (United States) =

American neo-Nazi party composed of gay men

- Leader: Russell Veh
- Founded: 1974
- Dissolved: 1984
- Headquarters: Los Angeles, California
- Newspaper: NS Mobilizer
- Ideology: Neo-Nazism
- Political position: Far-right

The National Socialist League (NSL) was an American neo-Nazi organization of gay men that existed from 1974 until 1984. It was originally founded by Jim Cherry, but was quickly taken over by Russell Veh, a neo-Nazi and transplant to Los Angeles, California, from Ohio. Veh financed the party using the profits from his printing business. He also financed the league with a film distribution unit that specialized in Nazi propaganda films, including Triumph of the Will. The National Socialist League had chapters in various parts of California, and implied in their mass mailing on July 4, 1978, that they had established an offshoot organization in Manhattan.

== History ==
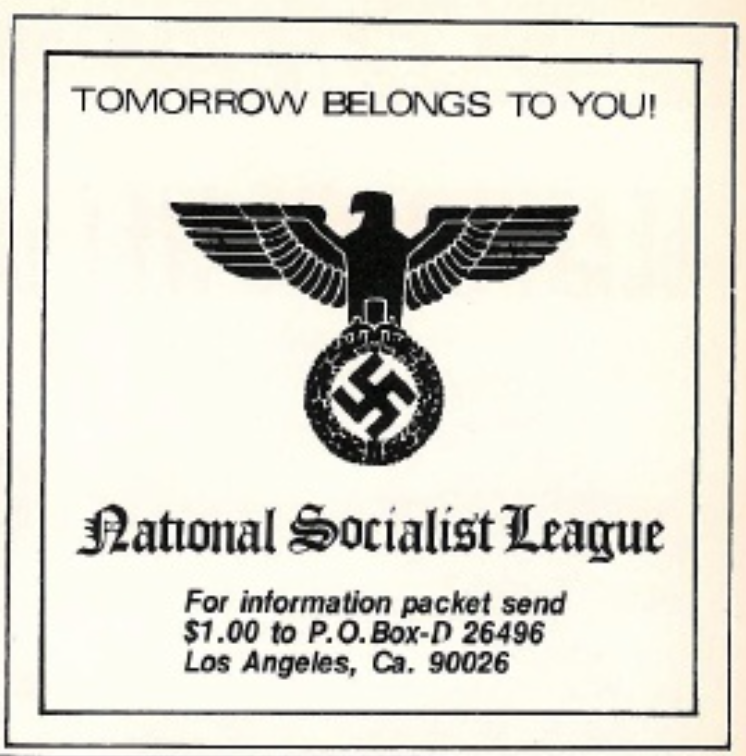
An advertisement for the National Socialist League in the leather magazine Drummer circa 1975

The league was founded in 1974 by Jim Cherry and several other California-based neo-Nazis. Early reports suggest that there were as many as 400 members of the National Socialist League in San Francisco, and organized across city and state lines.

The National Socialist League was unique in restricting its members to gay men. The group distributed membership applications declaring NSL's "determination to seek sexual, social, and political freedom" for Aryans. It argued that gay men had a role in maintaining the "white race" and that they were meant to be a military and cultural vanguard. They summarized this position in their 12-point credo.

The National Socialist League placed advertisements identifying themselves as the Gay Nazis that included their phone number in order to recruit new members during 1974 and 1975 in the classified ad section of the San Francisco gay newspaper the Bay Area Reporter. The NSL also advertised in the leather magazine Drummer, despite apprehension and personal dislike of Nazism by editor Jack Fritscher. The ad contained the slogan "Tomorrow Belongs to You!", an ironic reference to the song "Tomorrow Belongs to Me" in Cabaret, a 1972 film about the rise of Nazism in 1930s Germany, popular with gay men for its inclusion of LGBT characters. Another advertisement appeared in the San Francisco gay newspaper A Different Beat, in the January 1977 issue. This advertisement resulted in controversy for the paper.

In 1977, NSL applied for a free table at the Los Angeles Gay Pride Parade and was refused, marking a break from event organizer Christopher Street West's policy of total non-exclusion. This resulted in major debates within the community and coalesced in 1978 when Christopher Street West reversed its stance and stated that as a private organization they could act to endorse their community principles.

During its span of operation, the National Socialist League put out a journal called NS Kampfruf, later renamed NS Mobilizer. The magazine contained Nazi rhetoric as well as drawings of scantily clad Schutzstaffel soldiers with swastikas covering their genitals to emphasize the "sexual trip" described by the recruiting pitch.

The NSL had some degree of affiliation with the neo-Nazi militant group the National Socialist Liberation Front (NSLF), as despite the NSLF's public disavowal of homosexuality several of its leaders were ambivalent.

The NSL stirred a controversy in 1983 when it attempted to market the infamous 1930s Nazi anti-Semitic film Jud Süß ("Süss the Jew") which had been pirated by the group. An article in the Los Angeles-based Heritage and S.W. Jewish Press, titled "'Gay Nazis Peddling Vile 'Jud Suss' Film", named Veh and the National Socialist League as responsible for pushing it, and film distributor David Calbert Smith III told the S.W. Jewish Press they were familiar with Veh's piracy.

The National Socialist League disappeared in 1984, after which its periodical the NS Mobilizer was renamed to Race & Nation. Although Race & Nation was still edited by Russell Veh and distributed by his World Service, it stopped discussing the NSL and sexuality altogether.

== See also ==
- The Pink Swastika
- Homonationalism
- Persecution of homosexuals in Nazi Germany
