= Gordon Winrod =

American minister and convicted criminal (1926–2018)

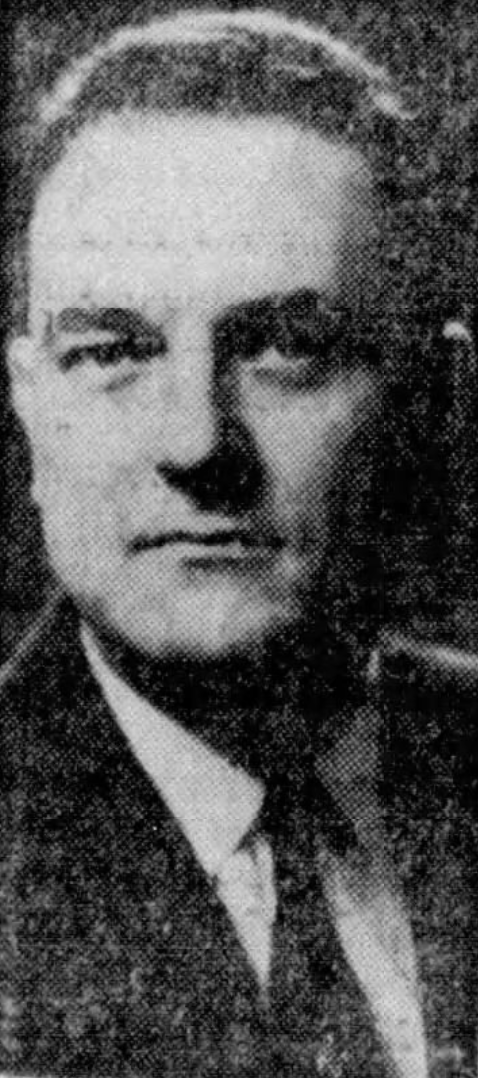
- Winrod in 1958
- Born: December 30, 1926; Wichita, Kansas, U.S.
- Died: August 29, 2018 (aged 91); Rutledge, Alabama, U.S.
- Education: Concordia Theological Seminary
- Movement: Christian Identity

Gordon Phillip Winrod (December 30, 1926 – August 29, 2018) was an American Christian Identity minister who was sentenced to a 30-year prison term for abducting six of his grandchildren in 1994 and 1995. Winrod was also ordered to pay up to $26 million after two of his grandchildren brought suit against him.

== Biography ==
Gordon Phillip Winrod was born in Wichita, Kansas, on December 30, 1926, to Gerald Burton Winrod. He attended a Lutheran day school (grades 1 through 8), finished high school at Hesston High School in Hesston, Kansas, and attended St. John's College in Winfield, Kansas.

From January 1945 to August 1948, Winrod served in the U.S. Maritime Service and the U.S. Navy. He married Genevieve Ann Dicke in Topeka, Kansas, in 1948. They had eleven children.

Winrod graduated from Concordia Theological Seminary in Springfield, Illinois in 1955. He then served as pastor of Lutheran Church – Missouri Synod (LCMS) congregations in San Antonio, Texas, and in Little Rock, Arkansas.

In April 1960, Winrod began publishing The Winrod Letter. Soon thereafter the LCMS expelled him from its ministerial roster. He then became the chaplain for the National States' Rights Party.

Winrod moved to Gainesville, Missouri, in 1965 and established Our Savior's Independent Christian congregation. He was sentenced to a 30-year prison term for abducting six of his grandchildren in 1994 and 1995. He was also ordered to pay up to $26 million after two of his grandchildren brought suit against him. He was released from prison in 2012, and died in Rutledge, Alabama, on August 29, 2018, at the age of 91.

== Legacy ==
Winrod attacked Jews and Judaism in his writings. He described Jews as child-molesting perverts who hate God, practice the religion of Satan, run a "Secret Jewish World Government of anti-Christ", and said that the Jews have butchered, burned, and bled Christians through the centuries.
