= Christendom =

Countries where Christianity prevails

Christianity – Percentage of population by country (2010 data)

Christendom or the Christian world are terms commonly used to refer to the global Christian community, Christian states, Christian-majority countries or countries in which Christianity is dominant or prevails.

Following the spread of Christianity from the Levant to Europe and North Africa during the early Roman Empire, Christendom has been divided in the pre-existing Greek East and Latin West. After the Great schism of 1054, two main branches within Christianity emerged, centred around the cities of Rome (Western Christianity, whose community was called Western or Latin Christendom) and Constantinople (Eastern Christianity, whose community was called Eastern Christendom or Byzantine commonwealth). After the fall of Constantinople in 1453, Latin Christendom rose to a central role in the Western world. Following the Reformation, Protestantism emerged as the third main branch of Christianity in the 16th century. The history of the Christian world spans about 2,000 years and includes a variety of socio-political developments, as well as advancements in the arts, architecture, literature, science, philosophy, politics and technology.

== Terminology ==
The Anglo-Saxon term crīstendōm appears to have been coined in the 9th century by a scribe somewhere in southern England, possibly at the court of king Alfred the Great of Wessex. The scribe was translating Paulus Orosius' book History Against the Pagans (c. 416) and in need for a term to express the concept of the universal culture focused on Jesus Christ. It had the sense now taken by Christianity (as is still the case with the cognate Dutch christendom, where it denotes mostly the religion itself, just like the German Christentum).

The current sense of the word of "lands where Christianity is the dominant religion" emerged in Late Middle English (by c. 1400).

Canadian theology professor Douglas John Hall stated (1997) that "Christendom" [...] means literally the dominion or sovereignty of the Christian religion." Thomas John Curry, Roman Catholic auxiliary bishop of Los Angeles, defined (2001) Christendom as "the system dating from the fourth century by which governments upheld and promoted Christianity." Curry states that the end of Christendom came about because modern governments refused to "uphold the teachings, customs, ethos, and practice of Christianity." British church historian Diarmaid MacCulloch described (2010) Christendom as "the union between Christianity and secular power."

Christendom was originally a medieval concept which has steadily evolved since the fall of the Western Roman Empire and the gradual rise of the Papacy more in religio-temporal implications practically during and after the reign of Charlemagne; and the concept let itself be lulled in the minds of the staunch believers to the archetype of a holy religious space inhabited by Christians, blessed by God, the Heavenly Father, ruled by Christ through the Church and protected by the Spirit-body of Christ; no wonder, this concept, as included the whole of Europe and then the expanding Christian territories on earth, strengthened the roots of Romance of the greatness of Christianity in the world.

There is a common and nonliteral sense of the word that is much like the terms Western world, known world or Free World. The notion of "Europe" and the "Western World" has been intimately connected with the concept of "Christianity and Christendom"; many even attribute Christianity for being the link that created a unified European identity.

== History ==
=== Rise of Christendom ===
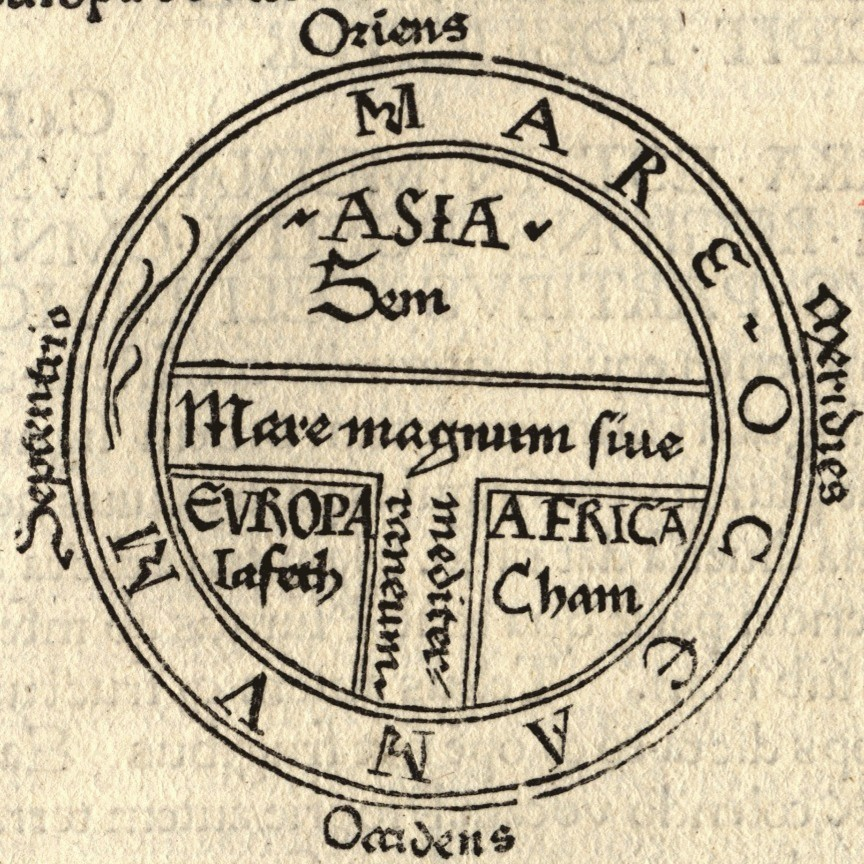
This T-and-O map, which abstracts the then known world to a cross inscribed within an orb, remakes geography in the service of Christian iconography. More detailed versions place Jerusalem at the center of the world.

Early Christianity spread in the Greek/Roman world and beyond as a 1st-century Jewish sect, which historians refer to as Jewish Christianity. It may be divided into two distinct phases: the apostolic period, when the first apostles were alive and organizing the Church, and the post-apostolic period, when an early episcopal structure developed, whereby bishoprics were governed by bishops (overseers).

The post-apostolic period concerns the time roughly after the death of the apostles when bishops emerged as overseers of urban Christian populations. The earliest recorded use of the terms Christianity (Greek Χριστιανισμός) and catholic (Greek καθολικός), dates to this period, the 2nd century, attributed to Ignatius of Antioch c. 107. Early Christendom would close at the end of imperial persecution of Christians after the ascension of Constantine the Great and the Edict of Milan in AD 313 and the First Council of Nicaea in 325.

According to Malcolm Muggeridge (1980), Christ founded Christianity, but Constantine founded Christendom. Canadian theology professor Douglas John Hall dates the 'inauguration of Christendom' to the 4th century, with Constantine playing the primary role (so much so that he equates Christendom with "Constantinianism") and Theodosius I (Edict of Thessalonica, 380) and Justinian I (Note: In 529, Justinian closed the Neoplatonic Academy of Athens, a last bulwark of pagan philosophy, made rigorous efforts to exterminate Arianism and Montanism, personally campaigned against Monophysitism, and made Chalcedonian Christianity the Byzantine state religion.) secondary roles.

=== Late Antiquity and Early Middle Ages ===
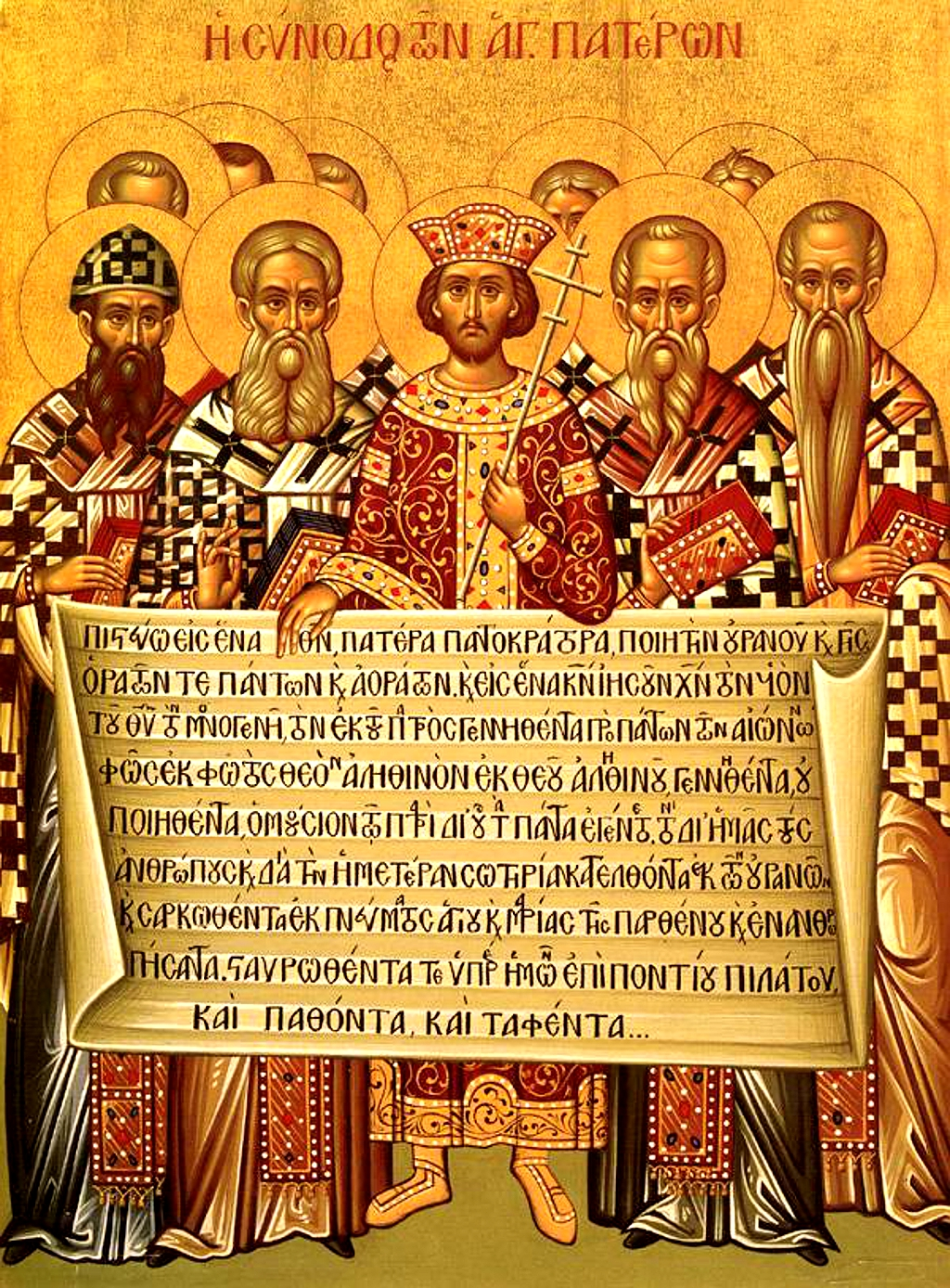
Icon depicting the Emperor Constantine and the bishops of the First Council of Nicaea (AD 325) holding the Niceno–Constantinopolitan Creed of 381

Spread of Christianity by AD 600 (shown in dark blue is the spread of Early Christianity up to AD 325)

"Christendom" has referred to the medieval and Renaissance notion of the Christian world as a polity. In essence, the earliest vision of Christendom was a vision of a Christian theocracy, a government founded upon and upholding Christian values, whose institutions are spread through and over with Christian doctrine. In this period, members of the Christian clergy wield political authority. The specific relationship between the political leaders and the clergy varied but, in theory, the national and political divisions were at times subsumed under the leadership of the church as an institution. This model of church-state relations was accepted by various Church leaders and political leaders in European history.

The Church gradually became a defining institution of the Roman Empire. Emperor Constantine issued the Edict of Milan in 313 proclaiming toleration for the Christian religion, and convoked the First Council of Nicaea in 325 whose Nicene Creed included belief in "one holy catholic and apostolic Church". Emperor Theodosius I made Nicene Christianity the state church of the Roman Empire with the Edict of Thessalonica of 380. In terms of prosperity and cultural life, the Byzantine Empire was one of the peaks in Christian history and Christian civilization, and Constantinople remained the leading city of the Christian world in size, wealth, and culture. There was a renewed interest in classical Greek philosophy, as well as an increase in literary output in vernacular Greek.

Byzantium created a brilliant culture, may be, the most brilliant during the whole Middle Ages, doubtlessly the only one existing in Christian Europe before the XI century. For many years, Constantinople remained the sole grand city of Christian Europe ranking second to none in splendour. Byzantium literature and art exerted a significant impact on peoples around it. The monuments and majestic works of art, remaining after it, show us the whole lustre of byzantine culture. That's why Byzantium held a significant place in the history of Middle Ages and, one must admit it, a merited one.

As the Western Roman Empire disintegrated into feudal kingdoms and principalities, the concept of Christendom changed as the western church became one of five patriarchates of the Pentarchy and the Christians of the Eastern Roman Empire developed. The Byzantine Empire was the last bastion of Christendom. Christendom would take a turn with the rise of the Franks, a Germanic tribe who converted to the Christian faith and entered into communion with Rome.

On Christmas Day 800 AD, Pope Leo III crowned Charlemagne, resulting in the creation of another Christian king beside the Christian emperor in the Byzantine state. The Carolingian Empire created a definition of Christendom in juxtaposition with the Byzantine Empire, that of a distributed versus centralized culture respectively. Charlemagne began the first Medieval Renaissance, the Carolingian Renaissance, a period of intellectual and cultural revival, in the 8th century. It continued through his descendants into the 9th century.

The classical heritage flourished throughout the Middle Ages in both the Byzantine Greek East and the Latin West. In the Greek philosopher Plato's ideal state there are three major classes, which was representative of the idea of the "tripartite soul", which is expressive of three functions or capacities of the human soul: "reason", "the spirited element", and "appetites" (or "passions"). Will Durant made a convincing case that certain prominent features of Plato's ideal community where discernible in the organization, dogma and effectiveness of "the" Medieval Church in Europe:

... For a thousand years Europe was ruled by an order of guardians considerably like that which was visioned by our philosopher. During the Middle Ages it was customary to classify the population of Christendom into laboratores (workers), bellatores (soldiers), and oratores (clergy). The last group, though small in number, monopolized the instruments and opportunities of culture, and ruled with almost unlimited sway half of the most powerful continent on the globe. The clergy, like Plato's guardians, were placed in authority... by their talent as shown in ecclesiastical studies and administration, by their disposition to a life of meditation and simplicity, and ... by the influence of their relatives with the powers of state and church. In the latter half of the period in which they ruled [800 AD onwards], the clergy were as free from family cares as even Plato could desire [for such guardians]... [Clerical] Celibacy was part of the psychological structure of the power of the clergy; for on the one hand they were unimpeded by the narrowing egoism of the family, and on the other their apparent superiority to the call of the flesh added to the awe in which lay sinners held them....

=== Later Middle Ages and Renaissance ===
After the collapse of Charlemagne's empire, the southern remnants of the Holy Roman Empire became a collection of states loosely connected to the Holy See of Rome. Tensions between Pope Innocent III and secular rulers ran high, as the pontiff exerted control over their temporal counterparts in the west and vice versa. The pontificate of Innocent III is considered the height of temporal power of the papacy. The Corpus Christianum described the then-current notion of the community of all Christians united under the Roman Catholic Church. The community was to be guided by Christian values in its politics, economics and social life. Its legal basis was the corpus iuris canonica (body of canon law).

In the East, Christendom became more defined as the Byzantine Empire's gradual loss of territory to an expanding Islam and the Muslim conquest of Persia. This caused Christianity to become important to the Byzantine identity. Before the East–West Schism which divided the Church religiously, there had been the notion of a universal Christendom that included the East and the West. After the East–West Schism, hopes of regaining religious unity with the West were ended by the Fourth Crusade, when Crusaders conquered the Byzantine capital of Constantinople and hastened the decline of the Byzantine Empire on the path to its destruction. With the breakup of the Byzantine Empire into individual nations with nationalist Orthodox Churches, the term Christendom described Western Europe, Catholicism, Orthodox Byzantines, and other Eastern rites of the Church.

The Catholic Church's peak of authority over all European Christians and their common endeavours of the Christian community—for example, the Crusades, the fight against the Moors in the Iberian Peninsula and against the Ottomans in the Balkans—helped to develop a sense of communal identity against the obstacle of Europe's deep political divisions. The popes, formally just the bishops of Rome, claimed to be the focus of all Christendom, which was largely recognised in Western Christendom from the 11th century until the Reformation, but not in Eastern Christendom. Moreover, this authority was also sometimes abused, and fostered the Inquisition and anti-Jewish pogroms, to root out divergent elements and create a religiously uniform community. Ultimately, the Inquisition was done away with by order of Pope Innocent III.

Christendom ultimately was led into specific crisis in the late Middle Ages, when the kings of France managed to establish a French national church during the 14th century and the papacy became ever more aligned with the Holy Roman Empire of the German Nation. Known as the Western Schism, western Christendom was a split between three men, who were driven by politics rather than any real theological disagreement for simultaneously claiming to be the true pope. The Avignon Papacy developed a reputation for corruption that estranged major parts of Western Christendom. The Avignon schism was ended by the Council of Constance.

Before the modern period, Christendom was in a general crisis at the time of the Renaissance Popes because of the moral laxity of these pontiffs and their willingness to seek and rely on temporal power as secular rulers did. Many in the Catholic Church's hierarchy in the Renaissance became increasingly entangled with insatiable greed for material wealth and temporal power, which led to many reform movements, some merely wanting a moral reformation of the Church's clergy, while others repudiated the Church and separated from it in order to form new sects. The Italian Renaissance produced ideas or institutions by which men living in society could be held together in harmony. In the early 16th century, Baldassare Castiglione (The Book of the Courtier) laid out his vision of the ideal gentleman and lady, while Machiavelli cast a jaundiced eye on "la verità effetuale delle cose"—the actual truth of things—in The Prince, composed, humanist style, chiefly of parallel ancient and modern examples of Virtù. Some Protestant movements grew up along lines of mysticism or Renaissance humanism (cf. Erasmus). The Catholic Church fell partly into general neglect under the Renaissance Popes, whose inability to govern the Church by showing personal example of high moral standards set the climate for what would ultimately become the Protestant Reformation. During the Renaissance, the papacy was mainly run by the wealthy families and also had strong secular interests. To safeguard Rome and the connected Papal States the popes became necessarily involved in temporal matters, even leading armies, as the great patron of arts Pope Julius II did. During these intermediate times, popes strove to make Rome the capital of Christendom while projecting it through art, architecture, and literature as the center of a Golden Age of unity, order, and peace.

Professor Frederick J. McGinness described Rome as essential in understanding the legacy the Church and its representatives encapsulated best by The Eternal City:

No other city in Europe matches Rome in its traditions, history, legacies, and influence in the Western world. Rome in the Renaissance under the papacy not only acted as guardian and transmitter of these elements stemming from the Roman Empire but also assumed the role as artificer and interpreter of its myths and meanings for the peoples of Europe from the Middle Ages to modern times... Under the patronage of the popes, whose wealth and income were exceeded only by their ambitions, the city became a cultural center for master architects, sculptors, musicians, painters, and artisans of every kind...In its myth and message, Rome had become the sacred city of the popes, the prime symbol of a triumphant Catholicism, the center of orthodox Christianity, a new Jerusalem.

The popes of the Italian Renaissance have been subjected by many writers with a harsh tone. Pope Julius II, for example, was not only an effective secular leader in military affairs, a deviously effective politician but foremost one of the greatest patron of the Renaissance period and person who also encouraged open criticism from noted humanists.

The blossoming of renaissance humanism was made very much possible due to the universality of the institutions of Catholic Church and represented by personalities such as Pope Pius II, Nicolaus Copernicus, Leon Battista Alberti, Desiderius Erasmus, sir Thomas More, Bartolomé de Las Casas, Leonardo da Vinci and Teresa of Ávila. George Santayana in his work The Life of Reason postulated the tenets of the all encompassing order the Church had brought and as the repository of the legacy of classical antiquity:

The enterprise of individuals or of small aristocratic bodies has meantime sown the world which we call civilised with some seeds and nuclei of order. There are scattered about a variety of churches, industries, academies, and governments. But the universal order once dreamt of and nominally almost established, the empire of universal peace, all-permeating rational art, and philosophical worship, is mentioned no more. An unformulated conception, the prerational ethics of private privilege and national unity, fills the background of men's minds. It represents feudal traditions rather than the tendency really involved in contemporary industry, science, or philanthropy. Those dark ages, from which our political practice is derived, had a political theory which we should do well to study; for their theory about a universal empire and a Catholic church was in turn the echo of a former age of reason, when a few men conscious of ruling the world had for a moment sought to survey it as a whole and to rule it justly.

=== Reformation and Early Modern era ===
Developments in western philosophy and European events brought change to the notion of the Corpus Christianum. The Hundred Years' War accelerated the process of transforming France from a feudal monarchy to a centralized state. The rise of strong, centralized monarchies denoted the European transition from feudalism to capitalism. By the end of the Hundred Years' War, both France and England were able to raise enough money through taxation to create independent standing armies. In the Wars of the Roses, Henry Tudor took the crown of England. His heir, the absolute king Henry VIII establishing the English church.

In modern history, the Reformation and rise of modernity in the early 16th century entailed a change in the Corpus Christianum. In the Holy Roman Empire, the Peace of Augsburg of 1555 officially ended the idea among secular leaders that all Christians must be united under one church. The principle of cuius regio, eius religio ("whose the region is, his religion") established the religious, political and geographic divisions of Christianity, and this was established with the Treaty of Westphalia in 1648, which legally ended the concept of a single Christian hegemony in the territories of the Holy Roman Empire, despite the Catholic Church's doctrine that it alone is the one true Church founded by Christ. Subsequently, each government determined the religion of their own state. Christians living in states where their denomination was not the established one were guaranteed the right to practice their faith in public during allotted hours and in private at their will. At times there were mass expulsions of dissenting faiths as happened with the Salzburg Protestants. Some people passed as adhering to the official church, but instead lived as Nicodemites or crypto-protestants.

The European wars of religion are usually taken to have ended with the Treaty of Westphalia (1648), or arguably, including the Nine Years' War and the War of the Spanish Succession in this period, with the Treaty of Utrecht of 1713. In the 18th century, the focus shifts away from religious conflicts, either between Christian factions or against the external threat of Islamic factions.

=== End of Christendom ===
Christian majority countries in 2010; Countries with 50% or more Christians are colored purple while countries with 10% to 50% Christians are colored pink.

The European Miracle, the Age of Enlightenment and the formation of the great colonial empires, together with the beginning decline of the Ottoman Empire, mark the end of the geopolitical "history of Christendom". Instead, the focus of Western history shifts to the development of the nation-state, accompanied by increasing atheism and secularism, culminating with the French Revolution and the Napoleonic Wars at the turn of the 19th century.

In his 1964 encyclical letter Ecclesiam Suam, Pope Paul VI observed that

One part of [the] world ... has in recent years detached itself and broken away from the Christian foundations of its culture, although formerly it had been so imbued with Christianity and had drawn from it such strength and vigor that the people of these nations in many cases owe to Christianity all that is best in their own tradition.

Writing in 1997, Canadian theology professor Douglas John Hall argued that Christendom had either fallen already or was in its death throes; although its end was gradual and not as clear to pin down as its 4th-century establishment, the "transition to the post-Constantinian, or post-Christendom, situation (...) has already been in process for a century or two", beginning with the 18th-century rationalist Enlightenment and the French Revolution (the first attempt to topple the Christian establishment). American Catholic bishop Thomas John Curry stated in 2001 that the end of Christendom came about because modern governments refused to "uphold the teachings, customs, ethos, and practice of Christianity". He argued the First Amendment to the United States Constitution (1791) and the Second Vatican Council's Declaration on Religious Freedom (1965) are two of the most important documents setting the stage for its end. According to British historian Diarmaid MacCulloch (2010), Christendom was 'killed' by the First World War (1914–18), which led to the fall of the three main Christian empires (Russian, German and Austrian) of Europe, as well as the Ottoman Empire, rupturing the Eastern Christian communities that had existed on its territory. The Christian empires were replaced by secular, even anti-clerical republics seeking to definitively keep the churches out of politics. The only surviving monarchy with an established church, Britain, was severely damaged by the war, lost most of Ireland due to Catholic–Protestant infighting, and was starting to lose grip on its colonies.

Changes in worldwide Christianity over the last century have been significant, since 1900, Christianity has spread rapidly in the Global South and Third World countries. The late 20th century has shown the shift of Christian adherence to the Third World and the Southern Hemisphere in general, by 2010 about 157 countries and territories in the world had Christian majorities.

== Classical culture ==
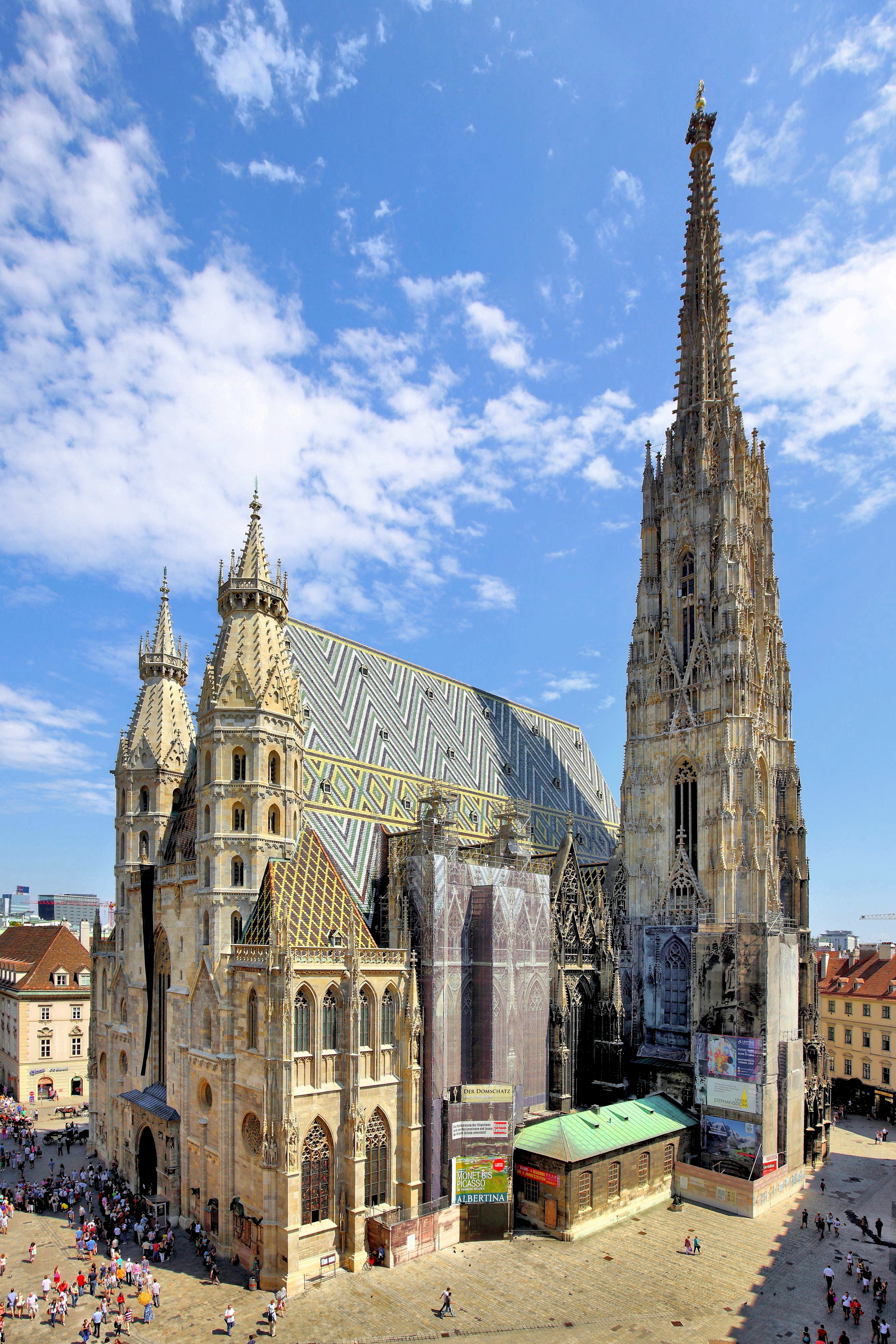
St. Stephen's Cathedral, Vienna

Western culture, throughout most of its history, has been nearly equivalent to Christian culture, and many of the population of the Western hemisphere could broadly be described as cultural Christians. The notion of "Europe" and the "Western World" has been intimately connected with the concept of "Christianity and Christendom"; many even attribute Christianity for being the link that created a unified European identity. Historian Paul Legutko of Stanford University said the Catholic Church is "at the center of the development of the values, ideas, science, laws, and institutions which constitute what we call Western civilization."

Though Western culture contained several polytheistic religions during its early years under the Greek and Roman Empires, as the centralized Roman power waned, the dominance of the Catholic Church was the only consistent force in Western Europe. Until the Age of Enlightenment, Christian culture guided the course of philosophy, literature, art, music and science. Christian disciplines of the respective arts have subsequently developed into Christian philosophy, Christian art, Christian music, Christian literature etc. Art and literature, law, education, and politics were preserved in the teachings of the Church, in an environment that, otherwise, would have probably seen their loss. The Church founded many cathedrals, universities, monasteries and seminaries, some of which continue to exist today. Medieval Christianity created the first modern universities. The Catholic Church established a hospital system in medieval Europe that vastly improved upon the Roman valetudinaria. These hospitals were established to cater to "particular social groups marginalized by poverty, sickness, and age," according to historian of hospitals, Guenter Risse. Christianity also had a strong impact on all other aspects of life: marriage and family, education, the humanities and sciences, the political and social order, the economy, and the arts.

Christianity had a significant impact on education and science and medicine as the church created the bases of the Western system of education, and was the sponsor of founding universities in the Western world as the university is generally regarded as an institution that has its origin in the Medieval Christian setting. Many clerics throughout history have made significant contributions to science and Jesuits in particular have made numerous significant contributions to the development of science. The cultural influence of Christianity includes social welfare, founding hospitals, economics (as the Protestant work ethic), natural law (which would later influence the creation of international law), politics, architecture, literature, personal hygiene, and family life. Christianity played a role in ending practices common among pagan societies, such as human sacrifice, slavery, infanticide and polygamy.

=== Art and literature ===
==== Writings and poetry ====
Christian literature is writing that deals with Christian themes and incorporates the Christian world view. This constitutes a huge body of extremely varied writing. Christian poetry is any poetry that contains Christian teachings, themes, or references. The influence of Christianity on poetry has been great in any area that Christianity has taken hold. Christian poems often directly reference the Bible, while others provide allegory.

==== Supplemental arts ====
Christian art is art produced in an attempt to illustrate, supplement and portray in tangible form the principles of Christianity. Virtually all Christian groupings use or have used art to some extent. The prominence of art and the media, style, and representations change; however, the unifying theme is ultimately the representation of the life and times of Jesus and in some cases the Old Testament. Depictions of saints are also common, especially in Anglicanism, Roman Catholicism, and Eastern Orthodoxy.

==== Illumination ====
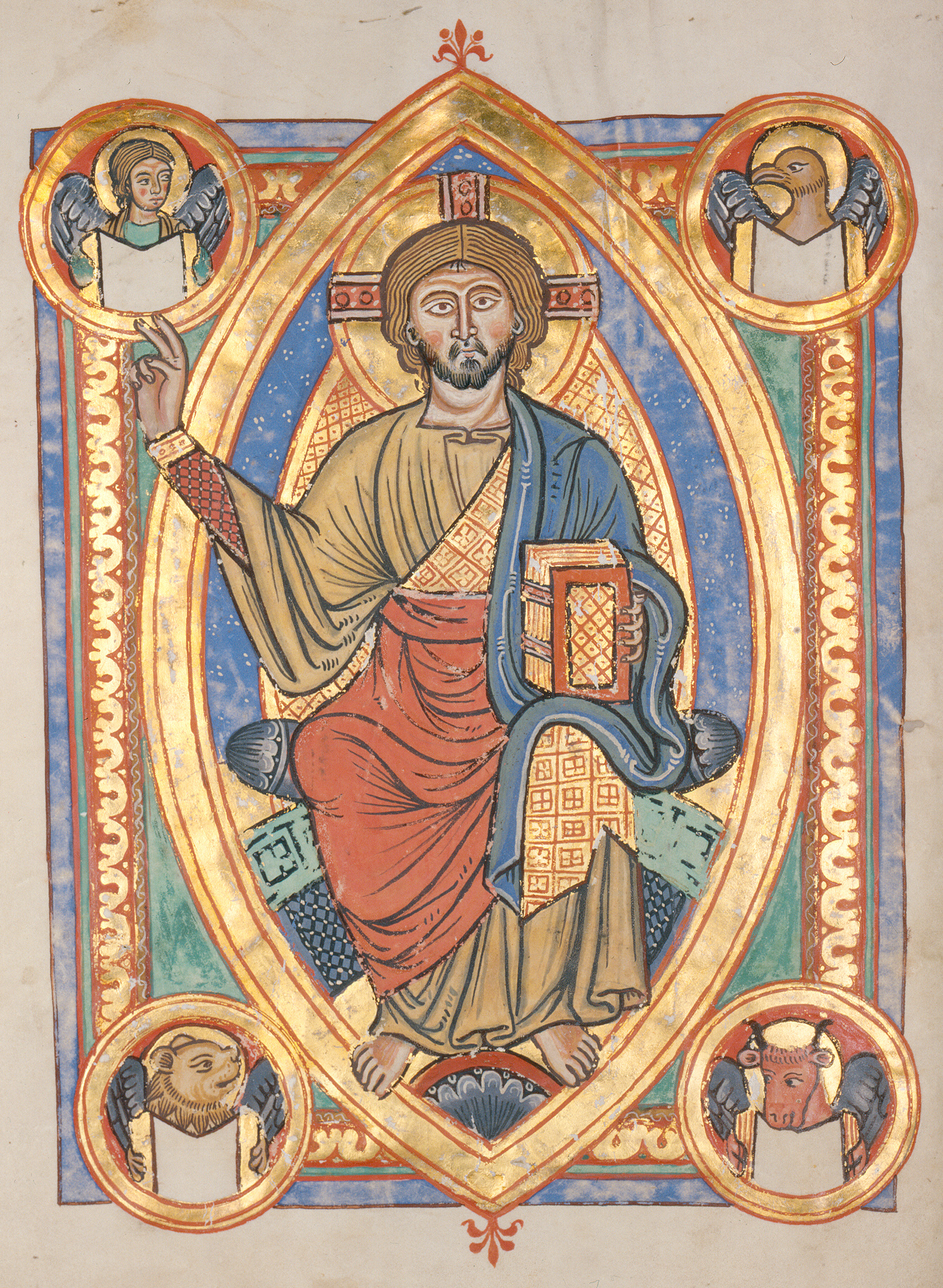
Picture of Christ in Majesty contained in an illuminated manuscript

An illuminated manuscript is a manuscript in which the text is supplemented by the addition of decoration. The earliest surviving substantive illuminated manuscripts are from the period AD 400 to 600, primarily produced in Ireland, Constantinople and Italy. The majority of surviving manuscripts are from the Middle Ages, although many illuminated manuscripts survive from the 15th century Renaissance, along with a very limited number from Late Antiquity.

Most illuminated manuscripts were created as codices, which had superseded scrolls; some isolated single sheets survive. A very few illuminated manuscript fragments survive on papyrus. Most medieval manuscripts, illuminated or not, were written on parchment (most commonly of calf, sheep, or goat skin), but most manuscripts important enough to illuminate were written on the best quality of parchment, called vellum, traditionally made of unsplit calfskin, though high quality parchment from other skins was also called parchment.

==== Iconography ====
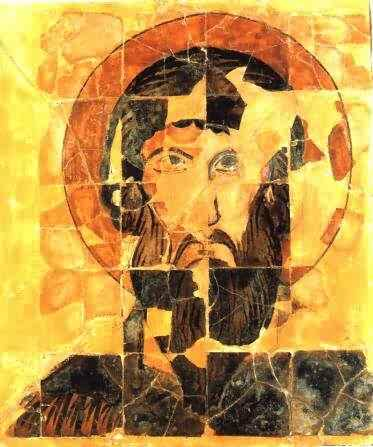
There are few old ceramic icons, such as this St. Theodor icon which dates to c. 900 (from Preslav, Bulgaria).

Christian art began, about two centuries after Christ, by borrowing motifs from Roman Imperial imagery, classical Greek and Roman religion and popular art. Religious images are used to some extent by the Abrahamic Christian faith, and often contain highly complex iconography, which reflects centuries of accumulated tradition. In the Late Antique period iconography began to be standardised, and to relate more closely to Biblical texts, although many gaps in the canonical Gospel narratives were plugged with matter from the apocryphal gospels. Eventually the Church would succeed in weeding most of these out, but some remain, like the ox and ass in the Nativity of Christ.

An icon is a religious work of art, most commonly a painting, from Eastern Christianity. Christianity has used symbolism from its very beginnings. In both East and West, numerous iconic types of Christ, Mary and saints and other subjects were developed; the number of named types of icons of Mary, with or without the infant Christ, was especially large in the East, whereas Christ Pantocrator was much the commonest image of Christ.

Christian symbolism invests objects or actions with an inner meaning expressing Christian ideas. Christianity has borrowed from the common stock of significant symbols known to most periods and to all regions of the world. Religious symbolism is effective when it appeals to both the intellect and the emotions. Especially important depictions of Mary include the Hodegetria and Panagia types. Traditional models evolved for narrative paintings, including large cycles covering the events of the Life of Christ, the Life of the Virgin, parts of the Old Testament, and, increasingly, the lives of popular saints. Especially in the West, a system of attributes developed for identifying individual figures of saints by a standard appearance and symbolic objects held by them; in the East they were more likely to identified by text labels.

Each saint has a story and a reason why he or she led an exemplary life. Symbols have been used to tell these stories throughout the history of the Church. A number of Christian saints are traditionally represented by a symbol or iconic motif associated with their life, termed an attribute or emblem, in order to identify them. The study of these forms part of iconography in Art history.

==== Architecture ====
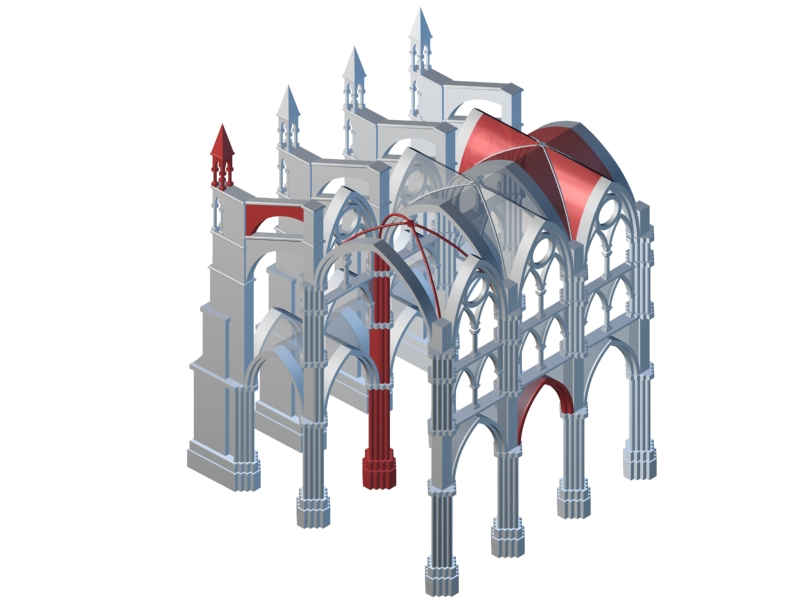
The structure of a typical Gothic cathedral

Christian architecture encompasses a wide range of both secular and religious styles from the foundation of Christianity to the present day, influencing the design and construction of buildings and structures in Christian culture.

Buildings were at first adapted from those originally intended for other purposes but, with the rise of distinctively ecclesiastical architecture, church buildings came to influence secular ones which have often imitated religious architecture. In the 20th century, the use of new materials, such as concrete, as well as simpler styles has had its effect upon the design of churches and arguably the flow of influence has been reversed. From the birth of Christianity to the present, the most significant period of transformation for Christian architecture in the west was the Gothic cathedral. In the east, Byzantine architecture was a continuation of Roman architecture.

=== Philosophy ===
Christian philosophy is a term to describe the fusion of various fields of philosophy with the theological doctrines of Christianity. Scholasticism, which means "that [which] belongs to the school", and was a method of learning taught by the academics (or school people) of medieval universities c. 1100–1500. Scholasticism originally started to reconcile the philosophy of the ancient classical philosophers with medieval Christian theology. Scholasticism is not a philosophy or theology in itself but a tool and method for learning which places emphasis on dialectical reasoning.

== Christian civilization ==
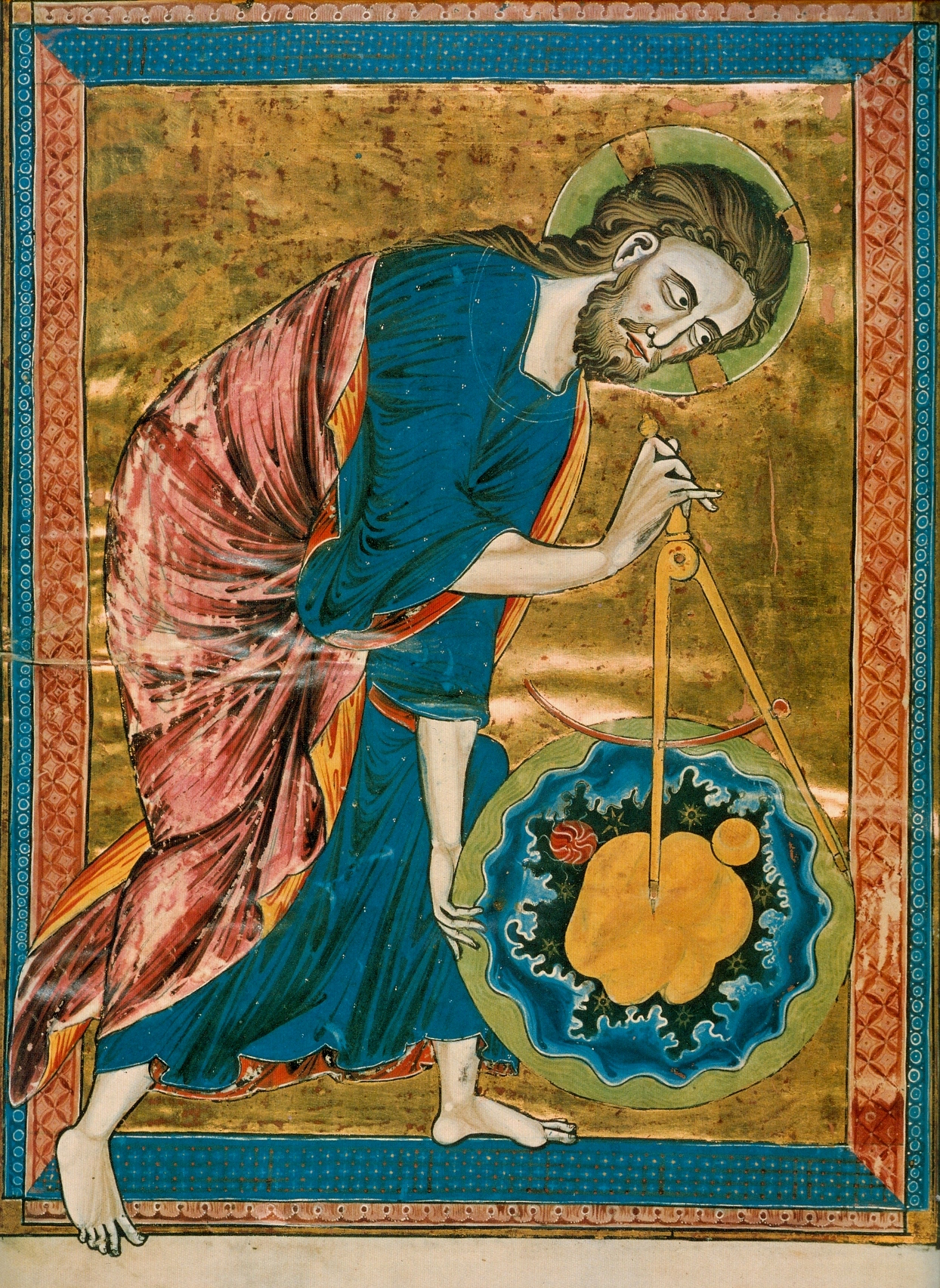
Science, and particularly geometry and astronomy, was linked directly to the divine for most medieval scholars. Since these Christians believed God imbued the universe with regular geometric and harmonic principles, to seek these principles was therefore to seek and worship God.

The West's rediscovery of the complete works of Aristotle led to the Renaissance of the twelfth century. It also created conflict between faith and reason, resolved by a revolution in thought called scholasticism. The scholastic writings of Thomas Aquinas impacted Catholic theology and influenced secular philosophy and law into the modern day.

Insights gained from Aristotle triggered a period of cultural ferment that Matthews and Platt say, one "modern historian has called the twelfth century renaissance". Historians of science David C. Lindberg, Ronald Numbers and Edward Grant have described what followed as a "medieval scientific revival". Science historians such as Noah Efron, therefore, give credit to multiple medieval Christian scientists for providing the early "tenets, methods, and institutions of what in time became modern science".

Byzantine art exerted a powerful influence on Western art in the twelfth and thirteenth centuries. Gothic architecture, intended to inspire contemplation of the divine, began in the same centuries.

Renaissance included revival of the scientific study of natural phenomena. Robert Grosseteste (1175–1253) devised a step-by-step scientific method; William of Ockham (1300–1349) developed a principle of economy; Roger Bacon (1220–1292) advocated for an experimental method in his study of optics. Historians of science credit these and other medieval Christians with the beginnings of what, in time, became modern science and led to the Scientific Revolution in the West.

=== Medieval conditions ===
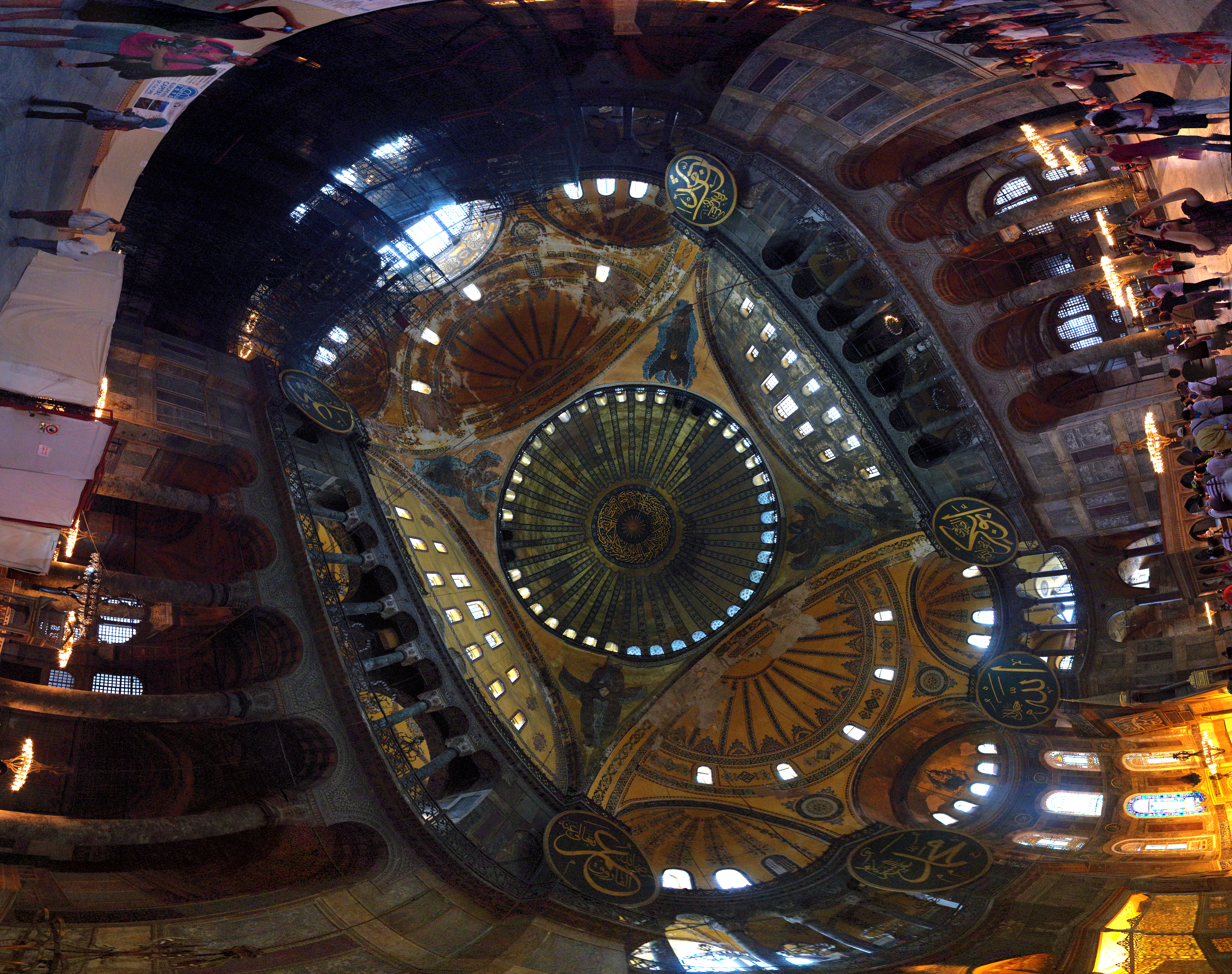
Interior panorama of the Hagia Sophia, the patriarchal basilica in Constantinople designed 537 AD by Isidore of Miletus, the first compiler of Archimedes' various works. The influence of Archimedes' principles of solid geometry is evident.

The Byzantine Empire, which was the most sophisticated culture during antiquity, suffered under Muslim conquests limiting its scientific prowess during the Medieval period. Christian Western Europe had suffered a catastrophic loss of knowledge following the fall of the Western Roman Empire. But thanks to the Church scholars such as Aquinas and Buridan, the West carried on at least the spirit of scientific inquiry which would later lead to Europe's taking the lead in science during the Scientific Revolution using translations of medieval works.

The Byzantine Empire was one of the peaks in Christian history and Christian civilization, and Constantinople remained the leading city of the Christian world in size, wealth, and culture. There was a renewed interest in classical Greek philosophy, as well as an increase in literary output in vernacular Greek. The Byzantine science played an important role in the transmission of classical knowledge to the Islamic world and to Renaissance Italy, and also in the transmission of Islamic science to Renaissance Italy. Many of the most distinguished classical scholars held high office in the Eastern Orthodox Church.

Numbers written with Cistercian numerals.

Beginning at Cluny Abbey (910), which used Romanesque architecture to convey a sense of awe and wonder and inspire obedience, monasteries gained influence through the Cluniac Reforms. However, their cultural and religious dominance began to decline in the mid-eleventh century when secular clergy, who were not members of religious orders, rose in influence. Monastery schools lost influence as cathedral schools spread, independent schools arose, and universities formed as self-governing corporations chartered by popes and kings. Canon and civil law became professionalized, and a new literate elite formed, further displacing monks. Throughout this period, the clergy and the laity became "more literate, more worldly, and more self-assertive".

Medieval technology refers to the technology used in medieval Europe under Christian rule. After the Renaissance of the 12th century, medieval Europe saw a radical change in the rate of new inventions, innovations in the ways of managing traditional means of production, and economic growth. The period saw major technological advances, including the adoption of gunpowder and the astrolabe, the invention of spectacles, and greatly improved water mills, building techniques, agriculture in general, clocks, and ships. The latter advances made possible the dawn of the Age of Exploration. The development of water mills was impressive, and extended from agriculture to sawmills both for timber and stone, probably derived from Roman technology. By the time of the Domesday Book, most large villages in Britain had mills. They also were widely used in mining, as described by Georg Agricola in De Re Metallica for raising ore from shafts, crushing ore, and even powering bellows.

Significant in this respect were advances within the fields of navigation. The compass and astrolabe along with advances in shipbuilding, enabled the navigation of the World Oceans and thus domination of the worlds economic trade.

Under Pope Gregory VII (1073–1085), the Roman Church became what John Witte Jr. calls "an autonomous legal and political corporation" that functioned as a "state" with a strong sense of its own socioeconomic and political interests. Following the era of Innocent III (1198–1216), the Papacy stood as the highest authority in the West for nearly two centuries. Hospitals, almshouses, and schools continued to be founded by the church of this era. Between the eleventh and the thirteenth centuries, the church had built huge cathedrals of staggering beauty in Catholic Europe.

The Cistercian movement was a wave of monastic reform after 1098. Cistercians were instrumental in promoting technological advancement and were among the best industrialists of the Middle Ages. Of the 740 twelfth-century Cistercian monasteries, nearly all possessed a water wheel used to develop innovative hydraulic engineering techniques, water circulation systems for central heating, produce olive oil or forge metal and produce iron. They taught and practiced advanced farming techniques such as crop rotation and were skilled metallurgists.

==== Universities ====
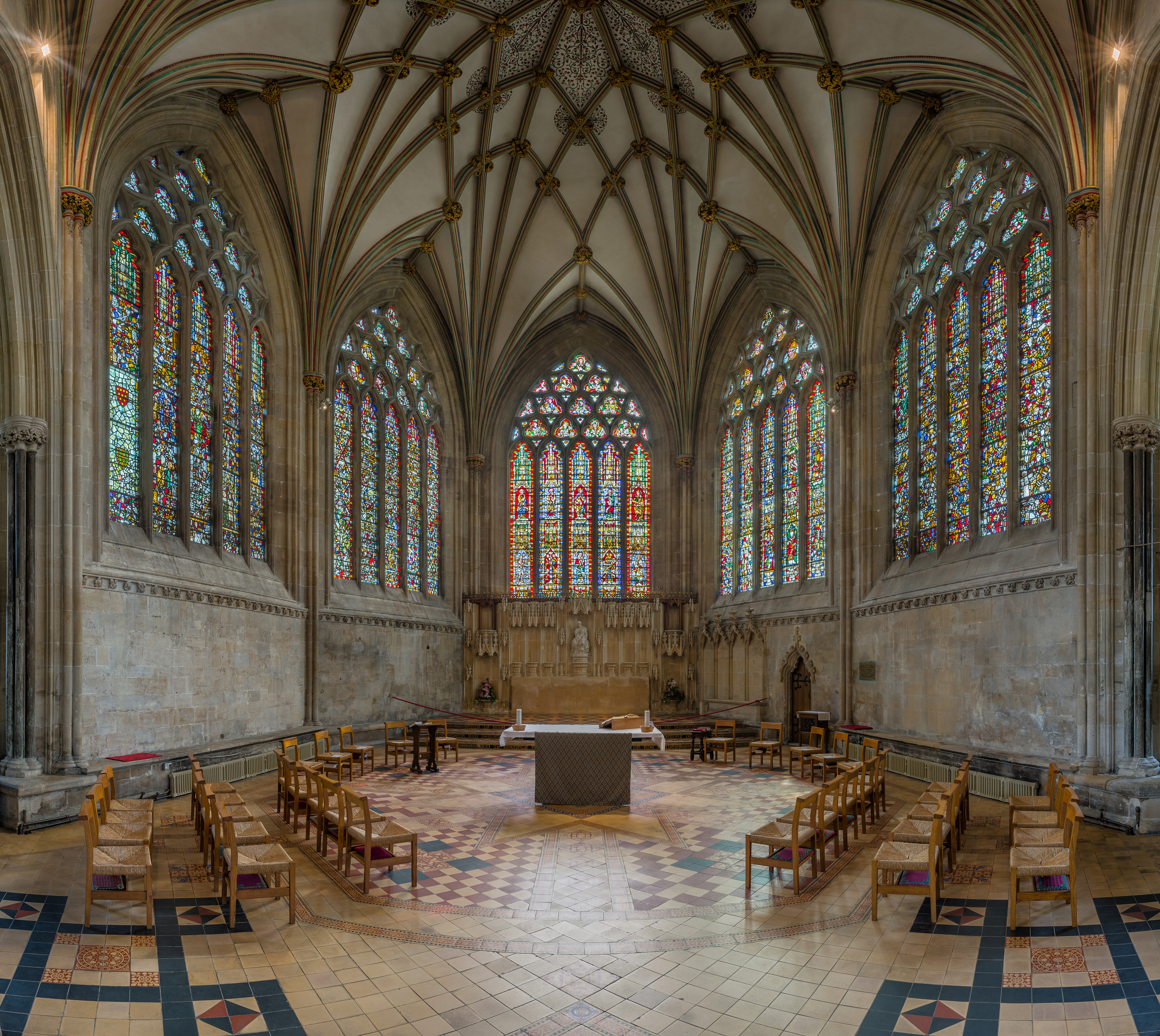
Gothic architecture of the Lady Chapel of Wells Cathedral in Somerset, England.

The first universities in Europe developed from schools that had been maintained by the Church for the purpose of educating priests. These universities evolved from much older Christian cathedral schools and monastic schools, and it is difficult to define the exact date when they became true universities, though the lists of studia generalia for higher education in Europe held by the Vatican are a useful guide.

From the 1100s, Western universities, the first institutions of higher education since the sixth-century, were formed into self-governing corporations chartered by popes and kings. Bologna, Oxford and Paris were among the earliest (c. 1150). Divided into faculties which specialized in law, medicine, theology or liberal arts, each held quodlibeta (free-for-all) theological debates amongst faculty and students and awarded degrees. With this, both canon and civil law began to be professionalized.

=== Renaissance innovations ===
During the Renaissance, great advances occurred in geography, astronomy, chemistry, physics, math, manufacturing, and engineering. The rediscovery of ancient scientific texts was accelerated after the Fall of Constantinople, and the invention of printing which would democratize learning and allow a faster propagation of new ideas. Renaissance technology is the set of artifacts and customs, spanning roughly the 14th through the 16th century. The era is marked by such profound technical advancements like the printing press, linear perspectivity, patent law, double shell domes or Bastion fortresses. Draw-books of the Renaissance artist-engineers such as Taccola and Leonardo da Vinci give a deep insight into the mechanical technology then known and applied. Gutenberg's printing press made possible a dissemination of knowledge to a wider population, that would not only lead to a gradually more egalitarian society, but one more able to dominate other cultures, drawing from a vast reserve of knowledge and experience.

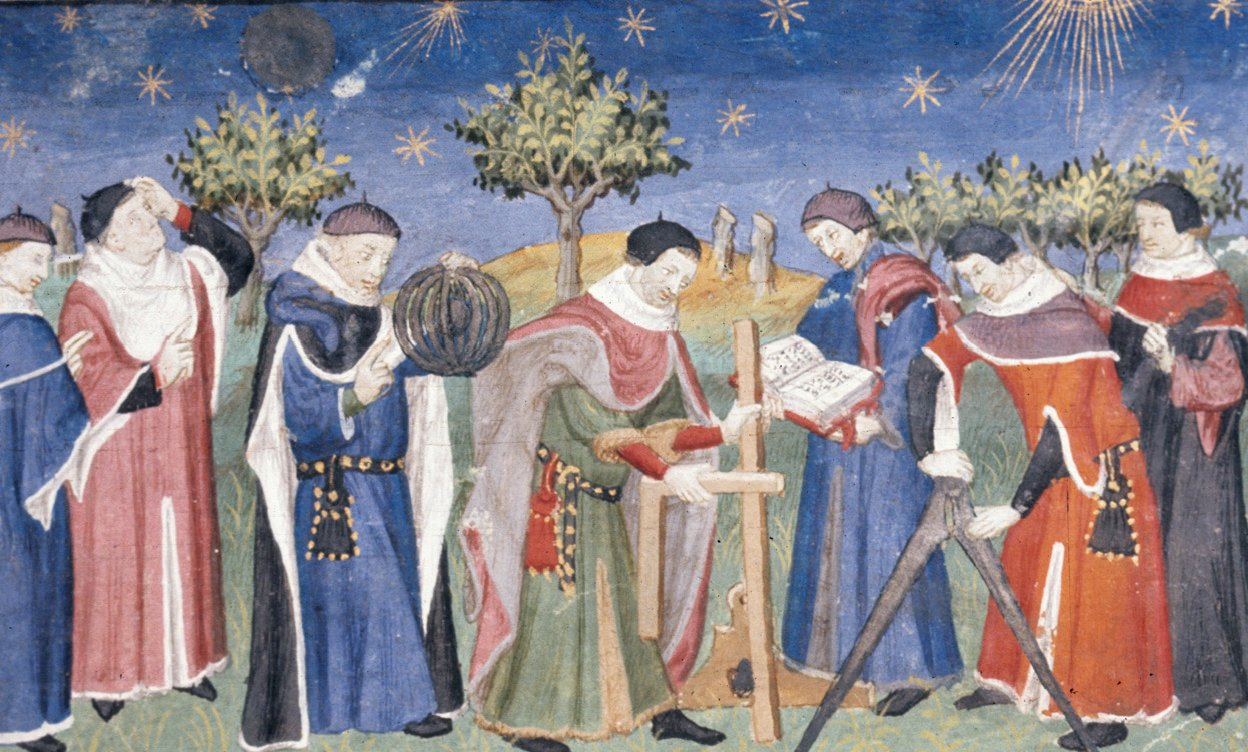
Studying astronomy and geometry. Early fifteenth-century painting, France.

Some scholars and historians attributes Christianity to having contributed to the rise of the Scientific Revolution. For example, Professor Noah J Efron says that "Generations of historians and sociologists have discovered many ways in which Christians, Christian beliefs, and Christian institutions played crucial roles in fashioning the tenets, methods, and institutions of what in time became modern science. They found that some forms of Christianity provided the motivation to study nature systematically..." Virtually all modern scholars and historians agree that Christianity moved many early-modern intellectuals to study nature systematically.

The rise of Protestantism contributed to the conceptualization of human capital, development of the Protestant work ethic, the European state system, development of banking and modern capitalism in Northern Europe, and overall economic growth. However, urbanization and industrialisation created a plethora of new social problems. In Europe and North America, both Protestants and Catholics provided massive aid to the poor, supported family welfare, and offered medicine and education.

=== Scientific Revolution ===
Galileo Galilei’s early 17th-century telescopic observations began the transformation of what had been a narrowly technical revision of classical astronomy by Copernicus - the pious Church official - into an increasingly aggressive challenge to traditional cosmology and the long-standing synthesis of Aristotelian physics and Christian theology. The upheaval of the Scientific Revolution ended the medieval view of natural philosophy as the servant (or "handmaiden") of theology. As natural philosophy continued to grow in power, self-confidence and independence during the 17th century, European society around it began to undergo a tectonic shift in intellectual attitude — from fides quaerens intellectum to a new mode of understanding that was, increasingly, completely uncoupled from religion. The science historian Alexandre Koyré memorably described this unintended outcome of the Scientific Revolution - the stripping of hierarchical order, purpose and meaning from the universe — as the "utter devalorization of being." In his Pensees published in 1670, the mathematician, philosopher and Catholic writer Blaise Pascal wrote that the "eternal silence of these infinite spaces frightens me."

== Demographics ==
=== Geographic spread ===
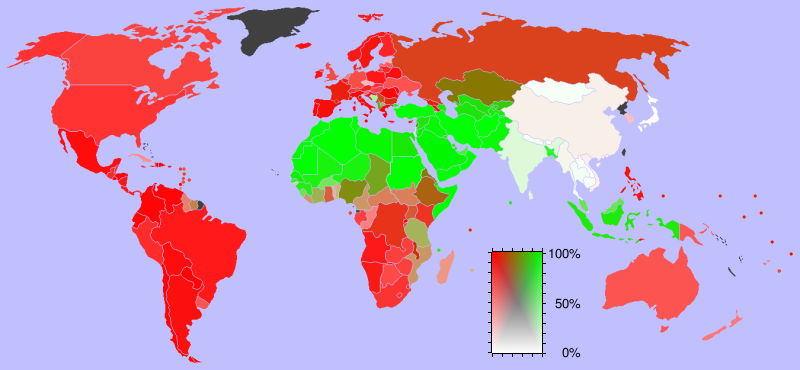
Relative geographic prevalence of Christianity versus Islam versus lack of either religion (2006)

In 2009, according to the Encyclopædia Britannica, Christianity was the majority religion in Europe (including Russia) with 80%, Latin America with 92%, North America with 81%, and Oceania with 79%. There are also large Christian communities in other parts of the world, such as China, India and Central Asia, where Christianity is the second-largest religion after Islam. The United States is home to the world's largest Christian population, followed by Brazil and Mexico.

Many Christians not only live under, but also have an official status in, a state religion of the following nations: Argentina (Roman Catholic Church), Armenia (Armenian Apostolic Church), Costa Rica (Roman Catholic Church), Denmark (Church of Denmark), El Salvador (Roman Catholic Church), England (Church of England), Georgia (Georgian Orthodox Church), Greece (Church of Greece), Iceland (Church of Iceland), Liechtenstein (Roman Catholic Church), Malta (Roman Catholic Church), Monaco (Roman Catholic Church), Romania (Romanian Orthodox Church), Norway (Church of Norway), Vatican City (Roman Catholic Church), Switzerland (Roman Catholic Church, Swiss Reformed Church and Christian Catholic Church of Switzerland).

=== Number of adherents ===
The estimated number of Christians in the world ranges from 2.2 billion to 2.4 billion people. (Note: Current sources are in general agreement that Christians make up about 33% of the world's population—slightly over 2.4 billion adherents in mid-2015.) The faith represents approximately one-third of the world's population and is the largest religion in the world, with the three largest groups of Christians being the Catholic Church, Protestantism, and the Eastern Orthodox Church. The largest Christian denomination is the Catholic Church, with an estimated 1.2 billion adherents.

Demographics of major traditions within Christianity (Pew Research Center, 2010 data)
Tradition	Followers	% of the Christian population	% of the world population	Follower dynamics	Dynamics in- and outside Christianity
Catholic Church	1,094,610,000	50.1	15.9	▲ Growing	▼ Declining
Protestantism	800,640,000	36.7	11.6	▲ Growing	▲ Growing
Orthodoxy	260,380,000	11.9	3.8	▼ Declining	▼ Declining
Other Christian Denominations	28,430,000	1.3	0.4	▲ Growing	▲ Growing
Christianity	2,184,060,000	100	31.7	▲ Growing	Stable

=== Notable Christian organizations ===
A religious order is a lineage of communities and organizations of people who live in some way set apart from society in accordance with their specific religious devotion, usually characterized by the principles of its founder's religious practice. In contrast, the term Holy Orders is used by many Christian churches to refer to ordination or to a group of individuals who are set apart for a special role or ministry. Historically, the word "order" designated an established civil body or corporation with a hierarchy, and ordination meant legal incorporation into an ordo. The word "holy" refers to the Church. In context, therefore, a holy order is set apart for ministry in the Church. Religious orders are composed of initiates (laity) and, in some traditions, ordained clergies.

Various organizations include:

- In the Roman Catholic Church, religious institutes and secular institutes are the major forms of institutes of consecrated life, similar to which are societies of apostolic life. They are organizations of laity or clergy who live a common life under the guidance of a fixed rule and the leadership of a superior. (ed., see Category: Catholic orders and societies for a particular listing.)
- Anglican religious orders are communities of laity or clergy in the Anglican churches who live under a common rule of life. (ed., see Category: Anglican organizations for a particular listing)

== Christian law and ethics ==
=== Canon law ===
Catholic canon law (Latin: jus canonicum) is the system of laws and legal principles made and enforced by the hierarchical authorities of the Catholic Church to regulate its external organization and government and to order and direct the activities of Catholics toward the mission of the church. The canon law of the Latin Church was the first modern Western legal system, and is the oldest continuously functioning legal system in the West.

Throughout the Middle Ages, a symbiotic relationship existed between ecclesiastical institutions and civil governments. Canon law and secular law were connected and often overlapped. Churches were dependent upon lay rulers, and it was those rulers - not the Pope - who determined who received what ecclesiastical job on their lands.

Canon law enabled the church to sustain itself as an institution and wield social authority with the laity. In the East, Roman law remained the standard. After the Empire fell, the West was a world of relatively weak states, endowed aristocracies, and peasant communities that could no longer use law from a "fallen" empire to uphold church hierarchy. Instead, the church adopted a feudalistic oath of loyalty, which became a condition of consecration which affected the hierarchy of church relations at every level.

The church developed an oath of loyalty between men and their king to create a new model of consecrated kingship. Janet Nelson writes that:

This rite has a continuous history in both Anglo-Saxon England and Francia from the eighth-century onward, with further refinements in the ninth and tenth. It is, among other things, a remarkable application of law by early medieval churchmen in the West, to which the East offers no parallel.

Canon laws were created by councils, kings, and bishops, and by lay assemblies. Law was not state-sponsored, systematized, professionalized, or university-taught in this period.

=== Church and state framing ===
Within the framework of Christianity, there are at least three possible definitions for Church law. One is the Torah/Mosaic Law (from what Christians consider to be the Old Testament) also called Divine Law or Biblical law. Another is the instructions of Jesus of Nazareth in the Gospel (sometimes referred to as the Law of Christ or the New Commandment or the New Covenant). A third is canon law which is the internal ecclesiastical law governing the Roman Catholic Church, the Eastern Orthodox churches, and the Anglican Communion of churches. The way that such church law is legislated, interpreted and at times adjudicated varies widely among these three bodies of churches. In all three traditions, a canon was initially a rule adopted by a council (From Greek kanon / κανών, Hebrew kaneh / קנה, for rule, standard, or measure); these canons formed the foundation of canon law.

Christian ethics in general has tended to stress the need for grace, mercy, and forgiveness because of human weakness and developed while Early Christians were subjects of the Roman Empire. From the time Nero blamed Christians for setting Rome ablaze (64 AD) until Galerius (311 AD), persecutions against Christians erupted periodically. Consequently, Early Christian ethics included discussions of how believers should relate to Roman authority and to the empire.

Under the Emperor Constantine I (312–337), Christianity became a legal religion. While some scholars debate whether Constantine's conversion to Christianity was authentic or simply matter of political expediency, Constantine's decree made the empire safe for Christian practice and belief. Consequently, issues of Christian doctrine, ethics and church practice were debated openly, see for example the First Council of Nicaea and the First seven Ecumenical Councils. By the time of Theodosius I (379–395), Christianity had become the state religion of the empire. With Christianity in power, ethical concerns broaden and included discussions of the proper role of the state.

Render unto Caesar... is the beginning of a phrase attributed to Jesus in the synoptic gospels which reads in full, "Render unto Caesar the things which are Caesar's, and unto God the things that are God's". This phrase has become a widely quoted summary of the relationship between Christianity and secular authority. The gospels say that when Jesus gave his response, his interrogators "marvelled, and left him, and went their way." Time has not resolved an ambiguity in this phrase, and people continue to interpret this passage to support various positions that are poles apart. The traditional division, carefully determined, in Christian thought is the state and church have separate spheres of influence.

Thomas Aquinas thoroughly discussed that human law is positive law which means that it is natural law applied by governments to societies. All human laws were to be judged by their conformity to the natural law. An unjust law was in a sense no law at all. At this point, the natural law was not only used to pass judgment on the moral worth of various laws, but also to determine what the law said in the first place. This could result in some tension. Late ecclesiastical writers followed in his footsteps.

==== Democratic ideology ====
Christian democracy is a political ideology that seeks to apply Christian principles to public policy. It emerged in 19th-century Europe, largely under the influence of Catholic social teaching. In a number of countries, the democracy's Christian ethos has been diluted by secularisation. In practice, Christian democracy is often considered conservative on cultural, social and moral issues and progressive on fiscal and economic issues. In places, where their opponents have traditionally been secularist socialists and social democrats, Christian democratic parties are moderately conservative, whereas in other cultural and political environments they can lean to the left.

=== Women's roles ===
Attitudes and beliefs about the roles and responsibilities of women in Christianity vary considerably today as they have throughout the last two millennia—evolving along with or counter to the societies in which Christians have lived. The Bible and Christianity historically have been interpreted as excluding women from church leadership and placing them in submissive roles in marriage. Male leadership has been assumed in the church and within marriage, society and government.

Some contemporary writers describe the role of women in the life of the church as having been downplayed, overlooked, or denied throughout much of Christian history. Paradigm shifts in gender roles in society and also many churches has inspired reevaluation by many Christians of some long-held attitudes to the contrary. Christian egalitarians have increasingly argued for equal roles for men and women in marriage, as well as for the ordination of women to the clergy. Contemporary conservatives meanwhile have reasserted what has been termed a "complementarian" position, promoting the traditional belief that the Bible ordains different roles and responsibilities for women and men in the Church and family.

== See also ==
- Caesaropapism – System with state control of the Church
- Christian republic – Government that is both Christian and republican
- The City of God – Book by Augustine of Hippo
- Constantine the Great and Christianity – Emperor Constantine's relationship, views, and laws regarding Christianity
- Constantinian shift – Political and theological changes
- Dar al-Islam – The Islamic counterpart notion to the Christian world.
- Dominion theology – Ideology seeking Christian rule
- Ecumenism – Cooperation between Christian denominations
- Holy Roman Emperor – Ruler of the Holy Roman Empire from 800 to 1806
- Integralism – Principle that the Catholic faith should be the basis of public law and policy
- Res publica Christiana – Medieval term for international community of Christian peoples and states
- Role of Christianity in civilization
- Ummah – Arabic term used to refer to the collective nation of Muslim people
- Union of Christendom, a traditional Catholic view of ecumenism
