= Douglas John Hall =

Canadian theologian (1928–2025)

The Reverend Douglas John Hall CM
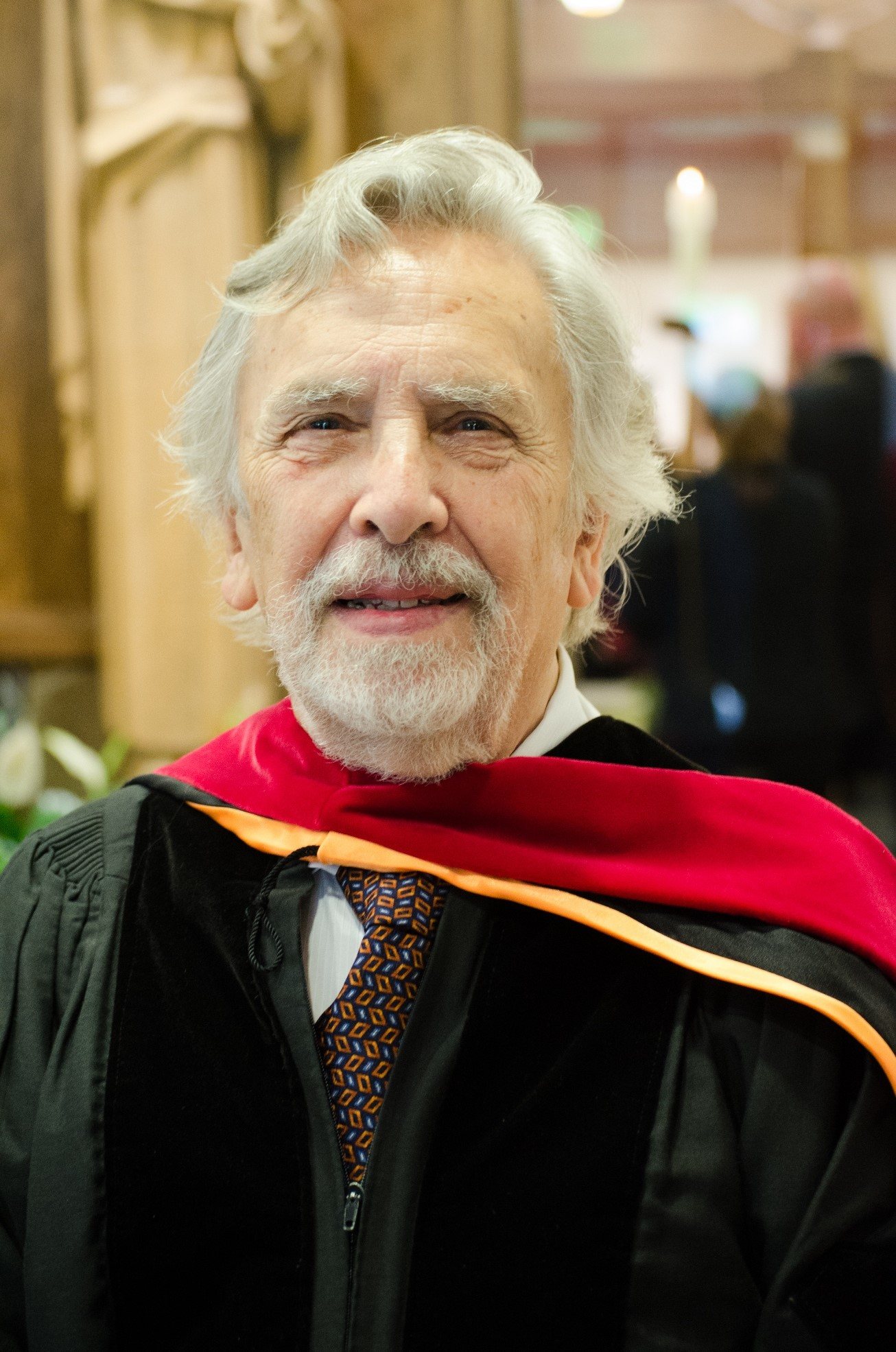
- Hall in 2013
- Born: March 23, 1928; Ingersoll, Ontario, Canada
- Died: April 10, 2025 (aged 97); Montréal, Québec, Canada
- Spouse: Rhoda Catherine Palfrey (m. 1960)

Ecclesiastical career
- Religion: Christianity
- Church: United Church of Canada

Academic background
- Education: University of Western Ontario; Union Theological Seminary
- Influences: John Coleman Bennett; Emil Fackenheim; George Grant; Reinhold Niebuhr; Paul Tillich

Academic work
- Discipline: Theology
- Sub-discipline: Constructive theology
- Institutions: St. Paul's United College; St. Andrew's College, Saskatchewan; McGill University

Douglas John Hall CM (March 23, 1928 – April 10, 2025) was a Canadian professor of theology at McGill University in Montreal, Quebec, and a minister of the United Church of Canada. Prior to joining the McGill Faculty of Religious Studies in 1975 he was MacDougald Professor of Systematic Theology at St Andrew's College in the University of Saskatchewan (1965–1975), Principal of St Paul's College in the University of Waterloo (1962–1965), and minister of St Andrew's Church in Blind River, Ontario (1960–1962).

== Early life and education ==
Hall was born on March 23, 1928, in Ingersoll, Ontario. He attended high school and business college in Woodstock, Ontario, and worked for four years in that city's daily newspaper. In 1948–1949 he studied composition and piano at the Royal Conservatory of Music in Toronto. He was graduated (Bachelor of Arts) from the University of Western Ontario (London) in 1953. His graduate degrees are all from Union Theological Seminary in New York City: Master of Divinity (1956), Master of Sacred Theology (1957), Doctor of Theology (1963).

== Professional life ==
The author of 24 published works, including a three-volume systematic theology, and numerous articles, Hall lectured widely in the United States and Canada during the period 1974–2010. He was Gastprofessor at the University of Siegen, Germany, in 1980; Visiting Scholar at Doshisha University in Kyoto, Japan, in 1989; Professor of Theology at the Melanchthon Institute of Houston, Texas, in 1999; member of the Campbell Seminar on the Future of the Church at Columbia Seminary of Decatur, Georgia, in 2000; Distinguished Visiting Professor at Trinity Lutheran Seminary, Columbus, Ohio, in 2001; Theologian-in-Residence, Church of the Crossroads in Honolulu, Hawaii (2003 f.); and Theologian-in-Residence, International Protestant Church in Vienna (2003).

Hall was an active participant in many international consultations including the World Convocation of the World Council of Churches (WCC) in Seoul, South Korea, 1990, and the UN AIDS theological symposium in Namibia (2003). He served on theological committees of the WCC and the World Alliance of Reformed Churches, the United Church of Canada, the National Council of Churches USA, et al.

== Thought ==
Influenced by his teachers Reinhold Niebuhr, Paul Tillich, John Coleman Bennett, and others, as well as fellow-Canadians including George Grant and Emil Fackenheim, Hall desired to understand and further the biblical and mainstream Reformation Protestant traditions of critical and constructive theology. He argued that over the past two centuries the Christian religion has been experiencing a momentous and (for most) disconcerting transition ("metamorphosis"): after fifteen centuries of legal and cultural "Establishment" in the West, Christianity is being challenged by the evolution of planetary history to assume a more modest, dialogical and humanly responsible position in the new global society.

Accordingly, he believed, the church must abandon the theological triumphalism that has typified its long fraternization with empire, and search its biblical and doctrinal traditions for ways of engaging, rather than seeking to monopolize the spiritual and intellectual life of humankind. In his books and lectures Hall argues that the stance (modus vivendi) appropriate to Christianity in the post-Christendom context is best illuminated by the ("never much loved" [Moltmann]) theological tradition that Martin Luther named theologia crucis ('theology of the cross'). That tradition, which Luther distinguished from the dominant religious and ecclesiastical conventions of Christendom (all variations of the theologia gloriae ,'theology of glory'), accentuates God's compassionate solidarity with the world; thus it opens the Christian movement to both secular and other faith-communities that seek planetary "peace, justice and the integrity of creation" [the theme of the World Council of Churches, Vancouver 1983-1990].

Hall affirmed that theology, in contrast to both "doctrine" and piety ("spirituality"), involves both historical knowledge and conscious, informed immersion in one's cultural context [contextuality]. Authentic theology only occurs where the claims of faith meet and wrestle with the great (characteristically repressed) questions and instabilities of the Zeitgeist [spirit of the times]. "Establishment" Christianity was content to transmit dogma and morality from place to place, generation to generation; post-Christendom theology entails original and diligent thinking [Denkarbeit!] including the entertainment of doubt and disbelief, on the part of the disciple-community. Today faith in all its forms and expressions is called to rescue human thinking as such from its captivation by "technical reason" (Tillich) or rechnendes Denken (Heidegger), as it manifests itself today (e.g.) in the West's educational emphasis on science, technology, engineering, and mathematics (STEM) often to the virtual exclusion of the arts and humanities (Sciences humaines et sociales).

== Personal life and death ==
Hall married the late Rhoda Catherine Palfrey, a fellow Canadian and graduate student at Columbia University, in 1960 at Riverside Church, New York City. They have four adult children (Kate, Christopher, Sara and Lucy), three of whom are professional musicians, and eight grandchildren.

Hall died on April 10, 2025, at the age of 97.

== Selected publications ==
- Lighten Our Darkness: Towards an Indigenous Theology of the Cross (1976, Revised 2001)
- Has the Church a Future? (1980)
- The Steward: A Biblical Symbol Come of Age (1982)
- Christian Mission: The Stewardship of Life in the Kingdom of Death (1985)
- God and Human Suffering: An Exercise in the Theology of the Cross (1986)
- A Trilogy: Christian Theology in a North American Context
  - Thinking the Faith (1991)
  - Professing the Faith (1993)
  - Confessing the Faith (1996)
- "Why Christian?" - For those on the Edge of Faith (1998)
- Remembered Voices: Reclaiming the legacy of 'Neo-Orthodoxy' (1998)
- The End of Christendom and the Future of Christianity (2002)
- When You Pray: Thinking Your Way into God's World (2003)
- Imaging God: Dominion as Stewardship (2004)
- The Messenger: Friendship, Faith, and Finding One's Way (2011)
- Waiting for Gospel: An Appeal to the Dispirited Remnants of Protestant "Establishment" (2012)
- What Christianity Is Not: An Exercise in "Negative" Theology (2013)

== Honours ==
- Member of the Order of Canada (C.M.) - 2003
- Distinguished Alumnus of Union Theological Seminary – 1995
- The Joseph Sittler Medal for Leadership in Theology, Trinity Seminary (Columbus) – 2002
- Three Book of the Year awards, Academy of Parish Clergy -1994, 1997, 2004
- Ten Honorary Doctorates:
  - Queen's University, Kingston – D.D. 1988
  - The University of Waterloo – LL.D. 1992
  - The Presbyterian Theological College of Montreal – D.D. 1995
  - Victoria University in the University of Toronto – D.D. 2003
  - Montreal Diocesan College – S.T.D. 2007
  - United Theological College, Montreal – D.D. 2007
  - Huron University College, University of Western Ontario – D.D. 2009
  - St Andrew's Theological College, University of Saskatchewan – D.D. 2011
  - Wartburg Theological College, Dubuque, Iowa – D.D. 2013
  - Vancouver School of Theology -D.D. 2013

== See also ==
Christomonism – Nontrinitarian viewpoint within Christianity

== Quotes ==
Si comprehendis, non est Deus.

- St. Augustine

I couldn't just believe, I had to understand! Of course I never could, yet now and then, I found that I was understood.

- Douglas John Hall, C.M., Th. D.
