= Deguello Report =

Far-right report

- First page of the original report
- Author: Unknown (possibly Robert DePugh)
- Language: English
- Subject: American far-right movement
- Publication date: July 1976
- Publication place: United States
- Media type: Report
- Pages: 54
- OCLC: 857796652
- Text: Deguello Report at Wikisource

The Deguello Report on the American Right Wing (Note: Also called Deguello, the Deguello Communication, or the Deguello Report. The report itself displays no title.) is a 54-page report that purports to document the disruption of the far-right movement in the United States by a communist conspiracy. The report is conspiratorial in nature and accuses a number of prominent far-right activists of being secretly gay, Jewish, or communists. It was written and distributed anonymously to several members of the far-right movement in 1976. It was republished in the 2000 academic volume the Encyclopedia of White Power, which collects primary sources relevant to the far right.

The distribution of Deguello was highly controversial within the far right, resulting in widespread speculation over the identity of its author, which has never been proven. The report itself claims it was written by intelligence agents sympathetic to the movement, a claim that was widely disbelieved by its audience. Some identify its author as Minutemen founder Robert DePugh, though he denied this. Others suggest the LaRouche movement or a member of the National States' Rights Party as the author. Deguello has been analyzed by scholars as an example of the paranoid ideology of the American far right in the 1970s.

== Contents ==
The report begins by addressing the recipient, said to be "a person whose integrity is highly regarded among patriotic Nationalists of the United States." It purports to have been written by several intelligence agents from across the world who were sympathetic to the far-right cause, who identify themselves as "Deguello" and say their purpose is to inform about the nature of the conspiracy afflicting the nationalist movement. The name "Deguello" is taken from the bugle call "El Degüello", which itself takes its name from the Spanish word degollar ('to cut the throat').

It includes a conspiratorial telling of history, defining successively the histories of the "Anti-Nationalist Conspiracy", the "Socialist Conspiracy", the "Jewish Conspiracy", and the "Homosexual Conspiracy". It writes that "communism has three faces. These three faces are socialism, Judaism and homosexualism." The Deguello Report focuses on Karl Marx, then goes on to discuss the John Birch Society, which it accuses of having been financed by "secret transfer of money from Jewish individuals and/or organizations". The author attempts to discredit most notable members of the white supremacist movement by accusing them of being communists, Jews, or gay.

Its section devoted to discussing allegedly homosexual far-right figures is 18 pages long, with the report stating that: "the Nationalist movement has been infiltrated by homosexuals to an extent that is almost incredible". In one instance, the writer of Deguello accuse white supremacists James K. Warner and David Duke of being gay lovers (alongside numerous other allegations directed at Warner, including that he had stolen the mailing lists of various other white supremacist groups). It further accuses Duke of being a leftist, writing that he "overflowed with sympathy for the negro people". White supremacist leader J. B. Stoner is accused of being an informer for the Anti-Defamation League, gay, and "an especially destructive Jew infiltrator" whose "specialty is [...] to convince most fair minded citizens that the typical leader of an American Nationalist movement must be totally insane".

The report concludes by summarizing its alleged findings, claiming there were unnamed groups that had not been infiltrated and that there were still "many good Nationalist Organizations within the United States and numerous smaller organizations that show promise. Only time will tell which, if any of them, can survive the struggle and ultimately provide the leadership which will be so badly needed in the years ahead."

== Distribution and authorship ==
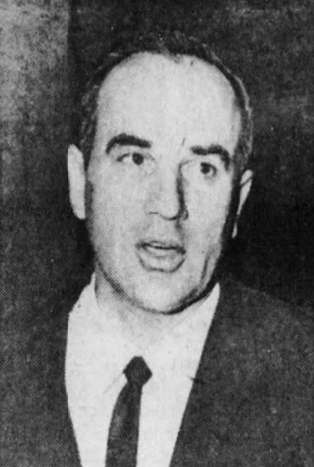
1966 photo of Robert DePugh, considered the likely author of the report

The Deguello Report was written anonymously as a statement from a member of the American white supremacist movement. It began to privately circulate among white nationalist and right-wing activists, starting in July 1976, when several typewritten copies of the report were mimeographed and mailed to a selected group making up several leaders of the far right, who then spread it. Its original distribution was 54 pages long.

The report sparked controversy within the far right, particularly among those who knew the people accused in it. It demoralized many members of the movement. Author Phillip Finch described the document's arrival as "a nightmare in a manila envelope", while Michael Newton said "echoes from the Deguello Report reverberated through the racist right". Due to its anonymous authorship, no libel actions could be filed.

Historian Jeffrey Kaplan said that it was "impossible to know how many people actually saw the 'Deguello Report', and of those, how many found credible the charges contained in the document." However, the document makes as many false as correct identifications; in Nazis, Communists, Klansmen, and Others on the Fringe, authors John George and Laird Wilcox said that it was at times "so far off base that it's obvious the report was really nothing more than name calling at its worst".

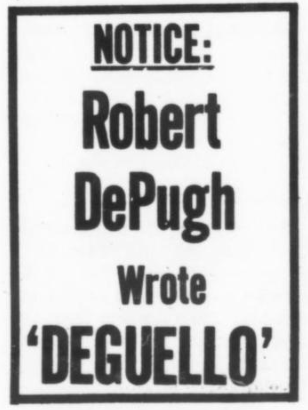
A notice in issue 214 (February 1977) of the white supremacist newspaper The Thunderbolt, which claims DePugh wrote it

This led to widespread speculation about who the author could be. The author was clearly an insider, and the document had some elements of truth (e.g. several members of the far right were actually gay). Some saw the report as credible, though almost no one believed that it was written by intelligence agents. Its authorship is contested, but it is often attributed to Robert DePugh, the founder of the far-right Minutemen revival organization.

Despite the suspicions of other far-righters, DePugh maintained that he was not the author. Kaplan said that DePugh was "possibly" the author of Deguello, while George and Wilcox argued that despite his denial, it was almost certainly written by DePugh. They cited his past rhetoric, noting it as having his "psychological fingerprints", and called it "a virtual transcript" of his past conversations, saying the report was him getting back at his enemies, which had become at that point the entire far right. If it was written by DePugh, it was the first major instance of antisemitic ideology in his political ideology, whereas previously he had been mostly focused on communists.

Besides DePugh, there are other theories as to the identity of the author. Scholar Peter Adams said it may have instead been written by a member of the neo-Nazi National States' Rights Party. Holocaust denier Keith Stimely accused fellow Holocaust denier David McCalden of authoring the report. A year after the distribution of the document, bulletins from the also anonymous "American Defense Group" accused the LaRouche movement organization the U.S. Labor Party of authoring Deguello; this has also never been proven, and some even accused whoever was behind the American Defense Group of being the author of Deguello. Several years later, the report had been largely forgotten by the far right, by then facing different issues.

The Deguello Report was reproduced in Jeffrey Kaplan's Encyclopedia of White Power, published by AltaMira Press in 2000. It is included as part of the book's array of primary source resources relevant to the neo-Nazi movement. It, with neo-Nazi Rick Cooper's "A Brief History of White Nationalism", is one of the book's two included internal "movement reports", which both attempt to trace the history of the neo-Nazi movement. Kaplan said its inclusion was to "provide the reader with the rather jaundiced view the American radical right have of themselves".

== Analysis ==
The report has been discussed for its conspiracy theories and paranoid ideation. Academic Jeffrey Kaplan called it an "incredible document" and described it as an example of the "level of viciousness and paranoia infecting the White Supremacist constellation" in the 1970s. Phillip Finch also viewed it as demonstrating the paranoia spread throughout some aspects of the far right, though he believed the idea of paranoia as an element of right wing thought was generally overstated by the media. He called its authorship inconsequential in comparison to the reaction to the document, "the indication it gave that the Radical Right is pricklishly sensitive to the possibility that it has been subverted", putting into words the paranoia that was present in much of the far right.

Jeffrey Kaplan described it as "accusing each of being secret communists taking part in a communist conspiracy, of being secret Jews involved in a Jewish conspiracy, secret homosexuals involved in a homosexual conspiracy, or in most cases a combination of the three". Kaplan argued that what made the document important was not these "stereotypical" allegations (which, he argued, were both impossible to prove and unlikely), but rather its conspiratorial ideology, rhetoric, and fratricidal tendencies. A writer for PitchWeekly said the rhetorical style seen in the Deguello Report was a "standard technique on the fringe right". Newton found many of its allegations to be absurd.

As both it and Rick Cooper's "A Brief History of White Nationalism" were included in the Kaplan encyclopedia as the two movement reports, they were compared by some reviewers of that volume. Sociologist Kathleen M. Blee said both it and Cooper's work were "fascinating" and "full of gossip on racist leaders and vitriolic assessments of rival groups". Sociologist Thomas Robbins said it was a much wilder document than Cooper's. Cooper's account was described by scholars as considerably more researched than the Deguello Report.
