= Encyclopedia of White Power =

2000 book edited by Jeffrey Kaplan

- Editor: Jeffrey Kaplan
- Language: English
- Publisher: AltaMira Press
- Publication date: 2000
- Media type: Print (hardcover)
- Pages: 585
- ISBN: 0-7425-0340-2
- OCLC: 42889808
- Dewey Decimal: 305.8'003
- LC Class: HT1523.E53 2000

Encyclopedia of White Power: A Sourcebook on the Radical Racist Right is a reference book about the white supremacist movement, edited by scholar Jeffrey Kaplan. Kaplan was then a professor at the University of Helsinki, and the encyclopedia originated from his thesis on the topic. It was published by AltaMira Press in hardcover format in 2000. The book includes 101 entries arranged alphabetically; it focuses on mainly American groups and individuals, with some northern Europeans also included. It also includes entries on concepts relevant to the movement.

Most entries were written by Kaplan, with a few other scholars also writing entries, among them Mattias Gardell, Frederick J. Simonelli, and Katrine Fangen. In addition to contributions by academics, mostly Kaplan, it includes a section of primary sources related to the far-right, prefaced by Kaplan, and a few entries written by white supremacists as "guest entries". The encyclopedia received positive reviews, with praise for its objectivity, writing style, and inclusion criteria, though some criticism was given over content omissions.

== Publication ==
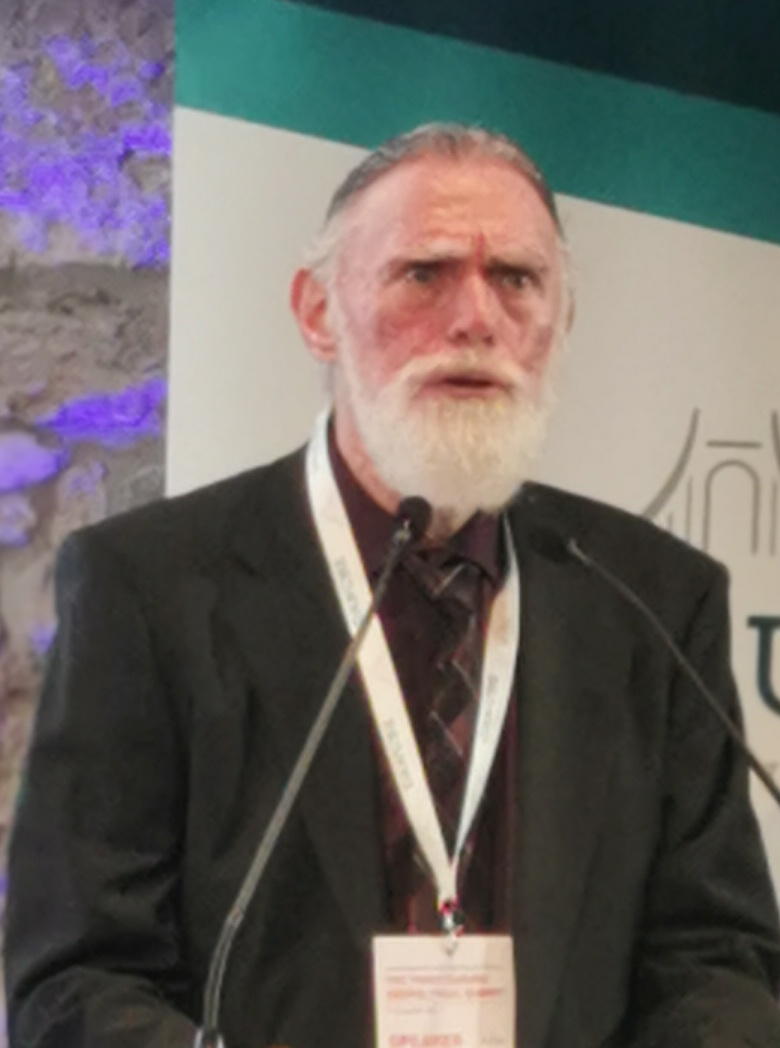
Author Jeffrey Kaplan in 2023

It was published by AltaMira Press, a division of Rowman & Littlefield, as a 585-page hardcover in 2000. Its author, Jeffrey Kaplan, was a Fulbright scholar in American Studies and was then a professor at the Finnish University of Helsinki. He has authored many other publications on the far-right in Europe and the United States. The encyclopedia originated from his thesis on the same topic.

== Summary ==
The Encyclopedia of White Power is split into three sections, the first of which is Kaplan's introductory essay of 20 pages. It also contains a glossary and a preface. His criteria for inclusion was that "the movements and individuals should be (i) strongly racialist, (ii) revolutionary, and (iii) have a strong religious streak." It excludes militia movements focused on the second amendment, and most historical rather than current movements, though makes an exception for figures like Adolf Hitler. It mostly includes American far-righters but there are also some Europeans, mostly from Scandinavia but some from the United Kingdom. Each entry has a bibliography and cross references. The overall purpose is to "gain a greater understanding of the 'Euro-American White Power subculture'".

Kaplan presents an insider/outsider view, which he argues in his introductory essay that though this will be controversial will allow for a deeper view than if it was just his voice; he argues that such movements cannot be fully understood through the watchdog groups that monitor them, which miss some aspects of the movement. Kaplan notes of his own entries that they are "far lengthier than one would expect in an encyclopedic work". He also argues that failing to understand such groups could backfire when "a new generation of seekers [...] reject our [anti-racist] wisdom [...] when they discover for themselves that those whom we had portrayed as the embodiment of all modern evil are simply people like ourselves". He argues that in discussion of the far-right racist culture, discussion tends to downplay their millenarianism; Kaplan argues this is actually one of the movement's key animating forces. He also argues that there has been a reversal in the idea flow of the far-right, whereas once ideas came from Europe and spread to America it had since reversed.

The largest, main section of the encyclopedia contains articles on people, groups, events and beliefs of the movement. The 101 entries are arranged alphabetically and are divided into 8 categories, included among them "Youth Scene", "Ku Klux Klan" and "Christian Identity". Entries range in length from a paragraph to seven pages. It contains analysis of the organizations and philosophies in the white power movement and the inter-relationships that exist between the movement's leaders and groups. Most entries are written by Kaplan, with some from other scholars. A few entries are by five far-righters as "guest entries" on topics they were associated with. They are separately indicated. Kaplan approached these contributors with the requirement that the authors do so in an unbiased manner.

The third section of the encyclopedia, Resources, contains 18 primary source documents from the far-right movement, also prefaced by Kaplan. This section is split into two, the first being "Movement Reports". The first movement report is the Deguello Report, an anonymous, conspiratorial document that Kaplan says is important for its negative insider view. The second report is Rick Cooper's A Brief History of White Nationalism. The second section of Resources is "Various Movement Documents", including letters and essays by the movement's most significant figures. Specific works included are George Lincoln Rockwell's In Hoc Signo Vinces and Louis Beam's "Leaderless Resistance", and an essay by Harold Covington. Kaplan notes that movement histories tend to portray "widely recognized movement figures as secret Jews, secret homosexuals, secret government agents, and, during the Cold War years, secret communists". It includes an index.

== Contributors ==
=== Academics ===
- Xavier Cattarinich
- Katrine Fangen
- Mattias Gardell
- Jeffrey Kaplan
- Edvard Lind
- Helene Lööw
- Frederick J. Simonelli
- Laird Wilcox

=== Far-right activists ===
- Rick Cooper
- Milton John Kleim, Jr. (left the movement by the time of the book's publication)
- James Mason
- Michael Moynihan
- Tommy Rydén

== Reception ==
The Encyclopedia of White Power received largely positive reviews. Sociologist Thomas Robbins praised Kaplan's writing as "fluent and often humorous", calling the tome "a riveting, fascinating volume which is informative, analytical, and sometimes very alarming; but which is also [...] basically objective." Stephanie Shanks-Meile recommended it for its accessibility and depth of information. She compared it against the 1992 book Nazis, Communists, Klansmen, and Others on the Fringe, which she noted as having far briefer entries. Russell Eisenman recommended it for giving an overall view of the topic and for covering numerous more obscure topics. He particularly praised its coverage of David Duke. Robbins further argued that despite Kaplan's empathy "some aspects of his presentation could not be more ominous and alarming". Booklist recommended it as "solid and important", but noted it as expensive. They also said it needed further editing, largely due to duplication of its material, specifically noting that information on the American Nazi Party was scattered throughout the book and that the Randy Weaver entry duplicated material within the single entry. Christopher B. Doob said its writing was at times "light-hearted, assertive, sometimes tongue in-cheek", which would challenge and engage the reader.

Kathleen M. Blee praised its inclusion criteria given the "diffuse organization and ideology of much of organized racism" and praised it for going against other works which did not distinguish between active and inactive and significant and insignificant groups, rather than "a handful of friends with a grandiose name". She noted the "guest entries" as ranging from peculiar to informative, but the main entries as "almost uniformly credible". She said Mason's entries were self-aggrandizing while noted Moynihan's as being able to distinguish his "hopeful visions for logical analysis". Of the two movement reports, she called them both fascinating but said given the information provided it was difficult to ascertain their reliability; she overall praised the book's inclusion of primary sources as a source for understanding. Robbins noted the pessimistic tone of several of the internal documents included. Doob found his introductions to these primary documents which established their significance good, but wished a similar thing had been done for the main entries. Reference & Research Book News noted its content as objective but sometimes offensive, though "presented in an academic way".

In his analysis of George Lincoln Rockwell, Robbins found Kaplan's omission of greater discussion on Rockwell's pivot to the "White Power" idea glaring in its omission, despite the title. Blee criticized the absence of a section on women's racist groups and individual women in the volume, saying that it focused only on those who claimed to be leaders, which led to the absence of "most men and virtually all women who occupy less visible niches in these groups"; in this she highlighted the inclusion of an entry on Randy Weaver, but the lack of one on the more ideological Vicki Weaver. Doob found its array of topics acceptable, but suggested an addition in an entry on "Ideological Influences" from the mainstream on such movements.
