= James K. Warner =

American white supremacist (born 1939)

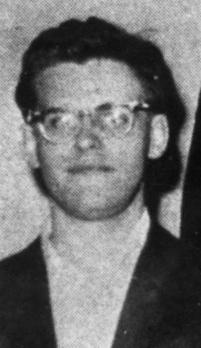
- Warner in 1962
- Born: James Konrad Warner; February 2, 1939; Wilkes-Barre, Pennsylvania, U.S.
- Died: before August 2018
- Political party: American Nazi Party; National States' Rights Party
- Other political affiliations: Christian Defense League; Ku Klux Klan
- Spouse: Debra Coleman

James Konrad Warner (February 2, 1939 – before August 2018) was an American neo-Nazi activist. He was an early recruit to the American Nazi Party as part of the core of the party and national secretary. He later became involved with the National States' Rights Party. After moving to Los Angeles, he was converted to Christian Identity by Wesley Swift and started the New Christian Crusade Church. Warner succeeded Richard Girnt Butler as leader of the Christian Defense League. He eventually moved both the New Christian Crusade Church and the Christian Defense League to Louisiana. Warner later became the Louisiana Grand Dragon of David Duke's Knights of the Ku Klux Klan.

== Early life ==
James Konrad Warner was born February 2, 1939, in Wilkes-Barre, Pennsylvania, the son of Conrad L. Warner. His parents were divorced. He graduated from Coughlin High School in 1957. He belonged to the school's German Club, though barely passed the language and was placed 171 out of a class of 198 students. Teachers described him as not very social but not a troublemaker either. He was married briefly but was divorced by 1963. Warner served in the United States Air Force out of high school for two years. He also briefly served in the U.S. Navy. He was ultimately discharged due to his neo-Nazi beliefs.

== Politics ==
=== Neo-Nazism ===
Warner was an early recruit to George Lincoln Rockwell's American Nazi Party (ANP) and was one of the men who formed the core of the party. He joined in mid 1959. He was known for his irritable and unpredictable personality, even for a neo-Nazi, frequently fighting with other members of the group. Warner made an unsuccessful attempt to integrate Odinism into the ANP as the religious dimension of the movement, after which he reportedly gave all of his Norse material to Else Christensen.

He eventually became the national secretary of the NSRP, but left in 1960, when he joined the National States' Rights Party, led by Ed Fields. Another story says he was expelled from the ANP by Rockwell because Rockwell believed he had stolen the ANP's mailing list. In later years Warner frequently referred to his experience in the ANP as a source of prestige. Warner was kicked out of the NSRP by Fields shortly after he joined, but then was allowed back in. He left Pennsylvania in 1962 to find work in Birmingham, Alabama, where he lived at the NSRP headquarters. He eventually became associate editor of the NSRP's monthly publication, The Thunderbolt. Rockwell criticized him in a November 1962 issue of his Rockwell Report, accusing him of being dishonest and disloyal, describing him as an "unprincipled scoundrel" who had attempted to use the ANP mailing list to enrich himself and then had left him for the NSRP; he said Warner must have "some kind of evil hold over Ed Fields".

In 1963, Warner was sentenced to 180 days in prison and fined $100 on trespassing charges trying to picket negotiations at the University of Alabama. Warner was again accused of stealing a mailing list, a charge which this time led to a court case, this time from the NSRP and Ed Fields. The case was settled out of court but severely injured his reputation in neo-Nazi circles (mailing list theft being considered "an unforgivable sin" among neo-Nazis). Having destroyed his reputation in the east, Warner decided to move to California, where he became affiliated with Ralph Perry Forbes and his branch of the National Socialist White People's Party (NSWPP), the rebranded American Nazi Party, though by this time Rockwell had been assassinated.

While Warner was in the California branch, it was undergoing leadership troubles, primarily due to his Forbes's conversion to the racist Christian doctrine of Christian Identity; several of the party members dissented, led by Allen Vincent, including Warner. Rockwell's successor Matt Koehl supported Forbes, resulting in a schism. This schism was established in 1968, and used the original name of the group, the American Nazi Party. Warner was its first leader. The rest of the members did not accept him. Warner then established another organization, Sons of Liberty. It published a newsletter, Sons of Liberty, and a magazine, Action, in the mid-1960s. Jeffrey Kaplan described Action as a neo-Nazi paper, and Sons of Liberty as "a forum from which to denounce everything, from the Young Americans for Freedom to all points on the political compass, as pawns of the Jewish conspiracy."

=== Christian Identity ===
After failing to take over the Californian branch of the NSWPP, Warner was converted to Christian Identity by Wesley A. Swift. In 1971, Warner founded the New Christian Crusade Church (NCCC), a Christian Identity church. Warner considered himself the spiritual heir to Swift. Once again, he was accused of stealing Swift's mailing list. After the publication of Arthur Koestler's The Thirteenth Tribe, Identity ministers like Warner used it as support that the Jews were not God's chosen people, with no claim to the land in Palestine.

Warner used the New Christian Crusade Church to speak of ZOG, that with "a hidden hand... secretly controls the flow of events in Mainstream America", proclaiming that since America was ruled by Jews, Warner claimed that the Jews used this power to perpetuate racial genocide. He also established a Christian Identity paper, Christian Vanguard. The paper also sold a plethora of antisemitic and white supremacist materials. Tom Metzger was ordained in the NCCC in 1974.

Following the death of Swift, Identity minister Richard Girnt Butler assumed control of Swift's church and moved it to Idaho, leaving control of the Christian Defense League to Warner. He became the director of the Christian Defense League in 1975. In 1976, he moved to Metairie, Louisiana, also moving the Christian Defense League and the New Christian Crusade Church to Louisiana. There, he became a close associate of David Duke, then merely a local figure, but heading the Knights of the Ku Klux Klan; Warner was not particularly fond of the KKK at this time but continued associating with Duke anyway. He became the director of information for Duke's Klan. Louisiana Grand Dragon of Duke's Knights of the Ku Klux Klan. He also became a mail order salesman of white supremacist materials.

In the mid 1970s, rumors about Warner's personal life began to worsen, both in regard to allegations of mailing list theft and also rumors over his sexuality, which were widely believed in the white supremacist movement. In 1976, Warner was listed in the Deguello Report, an anonymously distributed, conspiratorial far-right document that alleges that the far-right is infiltrated to an immense degree by gay people, Jews, and communists. It accuses Warner of numerous misdeeds, including that he had stolen the mailing lists of various other white supremacist groups and people to enrich himself. It also accused him of being Duke's gay lover. The document became infamous on the far-right. Similar allegations were also covered in Rick Cooper's History of White Nationalism.

In 1976, Duke and Warner were both arrested while traveling to a Klan rally; Warner was sentenced to three months in prison, while Duke received six months. They later ceased associating when Duke became a more prominent figure. After his and Duke's arrest, Warner withdrew from the wider white supremacist movement publicly, but continued publishing and running his white supremacist mail order sales business. In 1979, Warner donated portions of his library to the American Heritage Center at the University of Wyoming. In 1986, he attended the conference of the Institute for Historical Review, alongside Duke. Warner's second wife, Debra Coleman Warner, was also involved in politics. They had a son, Scott James Warner.

By 2000, Warner was effectively a pariah in the white supremacist movement. Scholar Jeffrey Kaplan wrote that he was "one of the most isolated veterans of the incessant wars of the radical right", made more striking by his former prominent involvement in several important white supremacist groups. This was primarily due to the rumor that Warner "habitually absconds with the precious mailing lists", by then "dogma" in the white supremacist movement. When millionaire Richard J. Cotter Jr., a friend of John F. Kennedy and the former assistant attorney general of Massachusetts, died, he gave $500,000 of his fortune to Warner's church, resulting in Warner's name making the headlines in 2000.

As of 2007, Warner was still active in neo-Nazi circles.

== Death ==
Warner preceded his son, Scott James Warner, who died July 28, 2018, in death.

== Works ==
- The Law of Odin
- Aryans and Jews: A Study in Racial Differences
- The White Racial Basis of American Civilization
- Secrets of the Synagogue of Satan
- The Real Hate Mongers
