= John Gillis (historian) =

American historian (1939–2021)

John Randall Gillis (/ˈɡɪlɪs/; January 13, 1939 – December 7, 2021) was an American historian. He was Professor Emeritus of History at Rutgers University.

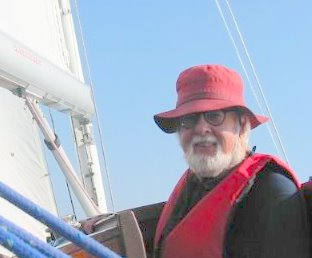
Gillis in 2010

== Biography ==
John R. Gillis received his B.A. from Amherst College and a Ph.D. from Stanford University under the direction of Gordon A. Craig.

Gillis was married to Christina Mardsen Gillis, author of Writing on Stone: Scenes from a Maine Island Life.

Gillis died in Berkeley, California on December 7, 2021, at the age of 82.

== Academic work ==
Gillis' early work was largely in social and cultural history. He began as a German historian, moved to British history, and then to age relations, marriage, memory, and the cultures of European and American family life. He later moved on to global history, with an emphasis on cultural geography and environmental history.

In 2004 he published Islands of the Mind, on the role played by islands in the economic, political, and social dimensions of Atlantic world and the way the myths, images, and narratives of islands function for mainland cultures.

Gillis subsequently began studying the history and geography of coasts and coastal peoples. In his 2012 book The Human Shore: Seacoasts in History, he begins with the first humans to approach the shore, tracing coastal migrations around the world, and discussing the ways that coasts and coastal people have figured in globalization over several centuries. The book concludes with an assessment of the current crisis of coasts when faced with the effects of climate change, treating coasts as an ecotone that encompasses both land and water. The book was published by the University of Chicago Press.

Gillis retired from Rutgers University in 2005 and since that time lived in Berkeley, California while spending summers on Great Gott Island, off Acadia National Park in Maine. There he was involved with the Island Institute, in Rockland, Maine. He published six books and edited four others.

== Academic advising ==
Gills was also a doctoral adviser, aiding eleven students in their PhD work at Rutgers. These former advisees include:

- Laura Tabili, Black workers in imperial Britain, 1914-1945 (1988)
- Kelly Boyd, "Wait till I'm a man": Ideals of manliness in British boys' story papers, 1855-1940 (1991)
- Deborah S Cornelius, In search of the nation: The new generation of Hungarian youth in Czechoslovakia, 1925-1931 (1994)
- Tammy Proctor, Gender, generation, and the politics of guiding and scouting in interwar Britain (1995)
- Benjamin Lammers, A superior kind of English: Jewish ethnicity and English identity in London's East End, 1905-1939 (1997)
- Victoria Smith, Constructing Victoria: The representation of Queen Victoria in England, India, and Canada, 1897-1914 (1998)
- Patrick McDevitt, May the best man win: Sport, masculinity and nationalism in Great Britain and the Empire, 1884-1933 (1999)
- Maritha Rene Burmeister, Popular anatomical museums in nineteenth-century England (2000)
- Charles Upchurch, '...and every solicitation, persuasion, promise, or threat': The regulation of male same-sex desire in London, 1820 to 1870 (2003)
- Lia Paradis, Return ticket: The Anglo-Sudanese and the negotiation of identity, 1920—1965 (2004)
- Lisa Kazmier, A modern landscape: The British way of death in the age of cremation (2005)

== Professional affiliation ==
Gillis was a current member of the editorial boards of the Journal of Family History and Young: Nordic Journal of Youth Research, and a past editorial board member of the Journal of Modern History. He taught at Princeton University and the University of California at Berkeley, was a visiting fellow of St. Antony's College, Oxford, and was a Life Member of Clare Hall, Cambridge University. In the Spring of 2001, Gillis was a Fellow at the Swedish Collegium for Advanced Study in Uppsala, Sweden.

Gillis was a member of the American Association of University Professors, the American Historical Association, and the World History Association. He was the former national co-chair of the Council on Contemporary Families.

== Awards and recognition ==
- Fellow, Woodrow Wilson International Center for Scholars, 1988
- Fellow, Center for Advanced Study in the Behavioral Sciences at Stanford, 1993-4
- Fellow, Swedish Collegium for Advanced Study in the Social Sciences, 2001

== Works ==
=== Author ===
- The Human Shore:Seacoasts in History (2012) ISBN 978-0226922232
- Islands of the Mind: How the Human Imagination Created the Atlantic World (2004) ISBN 978-1403965066
- The Prussian Bureaucracy in Crisis, 1840-60 (Stanford, 1971) ISBN 978-0804707565
- Youth and History: Tradition and Change in European Age Relations, 1750-Present (Academic, 1975) ISBN 978-0127852621
- Development of European Society, 1770-1870 (Houghton Mifflin, 1977)
- For Better, For Worse: British Marriages, 1600 to the present (Oxford, 1985) ISBN 978-0195036145
- A World of Their Own Making: Myth, Ritual, and the Quest for Family Values (Basic, 1996) ISBN 978-0465054145

=== Editor ===
- The Militarization of the Western World (Rutgers 1989)
- The European Experience of Declining Fertility, with D. Levine and L. Tilly (Blackwell, 1992)
- Commemorations: The Politics of National Identity (Princeton, 1996)
- Becoming Historians, with James M. Banner, Jr. (University of Chicago, 2009) ISBN 978-0-226-03658-8
