= Robert DePugh =

American far-right activist (1923–2009)

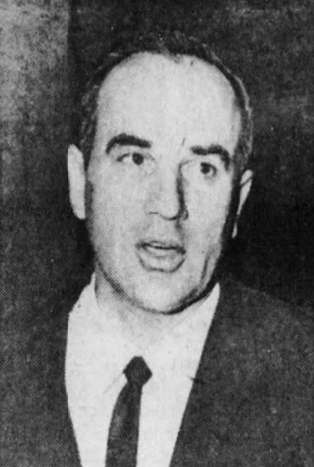
- 1966 photo of DePugh
- Born: Robert Boliver DePugh; April 15, 1923; Independence, Missouri, U.S.
- Died: June 30, 2009 (aged 86); Richmond, Missouri, U.S.
- Organization: Minutemen

Robert Boliver DePugh (April 15, 1923 – June 30, 2009) was an American anti-communist activist who founded the Minutemen militant anti-Communist organization in 1961.

== Life and career ==
DePugh was born in Independence, Missouri, where his father served as deputy sheriff. He enlisted in the United States Army during World War II, but he was dismissed for nervousness and depression. He attended Kansas State University for a few months before dropping out. DePugh founded a veterinary drug firm in 1953 that folded in 1956. He enrolled at Washburn University briefly, then started BioLab, another veterinary drug firm, in Norborne, Missouri, which was more successful. In addition to veterinary products, the company produces a malt-flavored ultra-compact storage food for humans called Minuteman Survival Tabs. Some 45 years later, this product is still used in survivalist circles. He became a member of the John Birch Society, and according to a biography he was influenced by the House Un-American Activities Committee.

DePugh published a 10-page pamphlet on guerrilla warfare via the Minutemen in 1961. The Minutemen's newsletter was called On Target. He was a founder of the Patriotic Party in 1966.

In 1966, DePugh was arrested on federal weapons charges, which were later dismissed. Their offices were bombed in 1967, and DePugh resigned from the Minutemen in 1967. In February 1968, he was indicted by a federal grand jury in Seattle, Washington for conspiracy to commit bank robbery. Also in 1968, he was arrested for violation of federal firearms laws. He skipped bail and went underground for over a year until he was caught in 1969 in Truth or Consequences, New Mexico. He was convicted of federal firearm violations in 1970, and sentenced to 10 years in prison. DePugh was released on parole in May 1973, having served about six years. DePugh later wrote an anti-communist quasi-survivalist manual, Can You Survive?, and was associated briefly with Liberty Lobby.

In the 1980s, DePugh became involved in the Christian Identity movement. In the early 1990s he was tried but acquitted on a morals and pornography charge with an underage girl and on three counts of federal firearms violations. DePugh eventually grew disgusted with all politics and retired from activism.

DePugh is believed to be the likely author of the anonymous Deguello Report, an insider far-right document that alleges numerous conspiracies about the movement, distributed in 1976. DePugh, suspected by other members of the far-right, denied that he was the author. Jeffrey Kaplan deemed it to have "possibly" been written by DePugh, while John George and Laird Wilcox argued that despite his denial, it was almost certainly written by DePugh. They cited his past rhetoric, noting it as having his "psychological fingerprints", and called it "a virtual transcript" of his past conversations, saying the report was him getting back at his enemies, which had become at that point the entire far right. If it was written by DePugh, it was the first major instance of antisemitic ideology in his political ideology, whereas previously he had been mostly focused on communists.

He died on June 30, 2009, at his home in Richmond, Missouri. After being visited by a friend, he said, "I've done some really interesting things in my life, but I just wish it hadn't hurt so many people." Near the end of his life, "his writings were anti-Bush, pro-Obama, and anti-Semitic, all at the same time."

== Selected publications ==
- Blueprint for Victory, Robert DePugh. 1966.
- Can You Survive? Robert DePugh. Published by Desert Publications, El Dorado, AZ, 1973. 214 pages. ISBN 0-87947-442-4
- Deguello Report (suspected) 1976.
