= Nation and Race =

1998 book edited by Jeffrey Kaplan

Nation and Race: The Developing Euro-American Racist Subculture
- Cover of the first edition
- Editors: Jeffrey Kaplan, Tore Bjørgo
- Language: English
- Subject: Far-right politics
- Publisher: Northeastern University Press
- Publication date: 1998
- Publication place: United States
- Media type: Print
- Pages: 273
- ISBN: 1-55553-331-0
- OCLC: 37489626
- Dewey Decimal: 305.80094
- LC Class: HV6250.3.E85 N37 1998

Nation and Race: The Developing Euro-American Racist Subculture is a book edited by Jeffrey Kaplan and Tore Bjørgo. An edited volume, it collects the papers of a December 1995 international conference held in New Orleans; each chapter focuses on aspects of the far-right political subculture. It was first published by Northeastern University Press in 1998.

== Contents ==
Following a preface and an introduction, the book includes 10 essays from authors from several disciplines. The first overviews far-right political developments. The essays included cover several subjects of the far-right subculture, including their internet presences, culture, and conspiracy theories common to the movement. The final chapter has Tore Bjørgo overview factors which lead to people leaving racist groups.

== Contributors ==
- Les Back
- Michael Barkun
- Tore Bjørgo
- Katrine Fangen
- Jeffrey Kaplan
- Michael Keith
- Wolfgang Kühnel
- László Kürti
- Helene Lööw
- Frederick J. Simonelli
- John Solomos
- Leonard Weinberg

== Publication history ==
The book was edited by academics Jeffrey Kaplan and Tore Bjørgo. It collects the papers of an international conference funded by the Harry F. Guggenheim foundation, held in New Orleans, from December 8 to 11, 1995. It was published by Northeastern University Press in 1998 as a 273-page paperback and hardcover.

== Reception ==
Multiple reviewers praised the first essay as particularly well written. Jerome L. Himmelstein, writing for Qualitative Sociology, said it presented "an intriguing, important argument", while Martin Durham noted it as wide-ranging. A reviewer called the book "new and important" and recommended it, but said it had some content that overlapped with earlier books. Cas Mudde for Political Studies found the title misleading, with it seeming to focus less on the "developing Euro-American racist subculture" and more "a weird and sinister 'otherworld' of neo-Nazis, skinheads and Satanists, whose common denominator is not only 'Nation and Race', but also the fact that they are all part of 'the loony fringe'". Mudde said that though this seemed fascinating, the implicit argument by the authors that this then-fringe milieu would influence global events, seemed very unlikely.
