= Murder of Willie Brewster =

1965 murder in Anniston, Alabama

- Part of the Civil Rights Movement
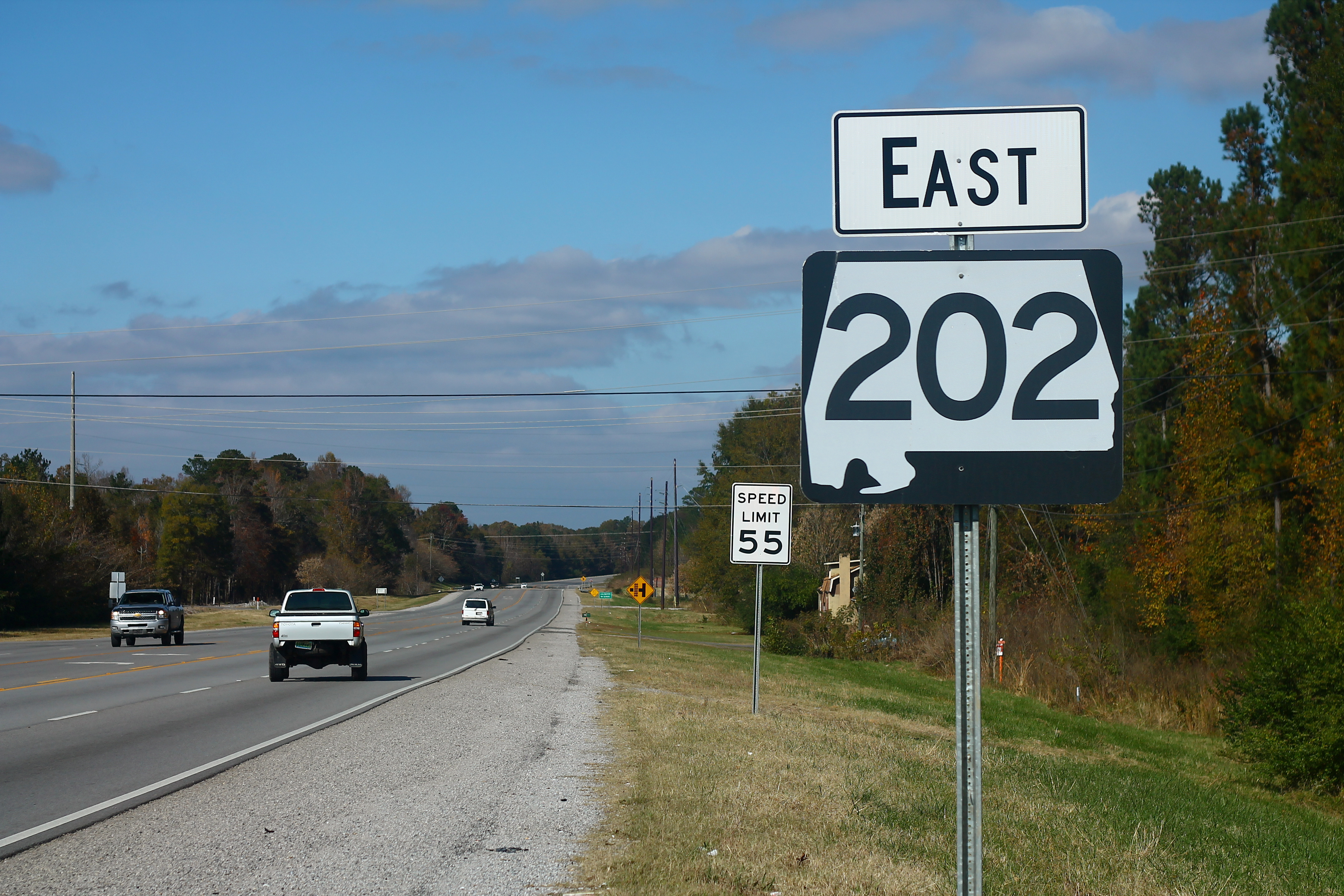
- Brewster was killed while driving on Highway 202
- Location: Anniston, Alabama
- Date: July 15, 1965
- Attack type: Shooting
- Victims: Willie Brewster, 39
- Perpetrators: Hubert Damon Strange; Johnny Ira DeFries (alleged); Clarence Lewis Blevins (alleged)
- Motive: Ku Klux Klan initiation (claimed); White supremacy
- Convicted: Hubert Damon Strange

On the evening of July 15, 1965, Hubert Damon Strange of the National States' Rights Party shot 39-year-old Willie Brewster as Brewster drove past him on Highway 202 outside Anniston, Alabama. Three days later, Brewster died in a hospital. In December of that year, Strange was convicted of second degree murder. The case was described as the first time in the history of Alabama that a white man was convicted of killing a black man in a racially motivated murder case. However, there are recorded instances of previous convictions of white people in the racially motivated murders of black people. For example, four white men were convicted of murder for lynching a black man in Elmore County in 1901.

== Killing ==
On July 15, 1965, Brewster was driving home with his coworkers from a nightshift at the Union Foundry, when shots were fired into the car by white supremacist Hubert Damon Strange. Brewster was hit in the neck and died three days afterwards from his wounds. The Anniston Star published a full-page advertisement announcing that they would "pledge the sum of $20,000 to the person who supplies information leading to the arrest and conviction of those responsible for the shooting Thursday night of Willie Brewster." Governor George Wallace, ironically a segregationist, offered a $1,000 reward.

On August 30, 1965, Strange was arrested after being reported by Jimmie Glenn Knight, a fellow racist and Klan affiliate who'd overheard him, DeFries, and Blevins bragging about shooting Brewster at the home of his friend and Strange's brother-in-law, William Rozier. Knight had driven Blevins and Strange back to the spot where Brewster was shot, after which Blevins said Strange had shot him. Shortly after, Knight was arrested for burglary and grand larceny. While in jail, he learned of the reward being offered in the Brewster case and decided to turn in the trio. Strange, DeFries, Blevins, and Knight were later released on bond. On September 14, Knight got into a fight with Strange and his brother Robert at a cafe. Robert said they were going to kill him, after which a fist fight ensued and the two men badly beat Knight. When the owner said that no fighting was allowed, Hubert took out a gun and said he was going to kill Knight. At this, Knight, whom a witness described as having extremely quick hands, immediately drew out a pistol. Both men fired at the same time, with Strange being hit in the chest and Knight being grazed in the hand. Knight pressed charges against the brothers for assault with intent to murder.

Shortly before the murder, Strange and his friends had attended a NSRP rally, where Reverend Connie Lynch of California decried the desegregation of Anniston High School and urged members to do whatever it took to stop desegregation:

"If it takes killing to get the Negroes out of the white man's streets and to protect our constitutional rights, I say, yes, kill them."

Knight had attended the same rally. However, his racist views were less virulent than those of Strange and his friends and he was far more interested in obtaining the reward money than helping cover up the murder of a black man. He also resented them for not helping get him out of jail on his pending charges. The defense attorney for Strange, NSRP chairman J. B. Stoner, tried to discredit Knight, the star witness for the prosecution and the strongest evidence in the case, as the murder weapon was never found. Stoner had Knight reveal his pending criminal charges and that he'd reported Strange solely for the money. He said Strange had an alibi and that the case came down to whether the jury was going to believe a "liar and a thief" or "an innocent man when there is no other evidence pointing toward the defendant."

Strange's trial started in November, and he was convicted of second degree murder by an all-white jury on December 2, 1965. The jury fixed his sentence at 10 years in prison, the minimum allowed. The plot of shooting a black person was allegedly hatched at Ku Klux Klan member Kenneth Adams' filling station the night before Brewster was killed. The men behind the killing belonged to the National States' Rights Party, a violent white supremacist group whose members had been involved in church bombings and murders of blacks. In an interview in the mid-2000s, Jimmie Knight's wife said that according to her husband, Strange had committed the murder as part of an initiation into the Ku Klux Klan.

Johnny Ira DeFries and Clarence Lewis Blevins were tried as accomplices to the murder. However, DeFries was acquitted in February 1966. The charges against Blevins were dropped shortly after.

Five months after the conviction of Strange, Knight received his promised $20,000 reward.

== Aftermath ==
Strange never served his sentence. He was released pending appeal. On May 5, 1966, he and his brother James were charged with kidnapping and assault with intent to murder in the attack of another black man, Walter Gortney. Gortney testified today that brothers approached him as he sat in a car with a Negro man, opened the door, struck him, and ordered him into their car. They then drove out on a road and John beat him there. The kidnapping charge was later dropped. Hubert was allowed to remain on bond and John was also released on bond.

Hubert Strange was shot and killed during a fight on November 2, 1966. His appeal was subsequently dismissed. Billy Claude Clayton was charged with first degree murder for killing Strange. At his trial, he testified that he'd gotten into a fist fight with Strange, who had broken his jaw, two weeks earlier. The day he killed him, Strange and another man, Frank Goad, had approached his car outside a cafe. Strange had knocked out the window and told Clayton to get out so he could beat him up, but Clayton refused after noticing that Goad had a knife in his hand. When Strange grabbed his arm, Clayton shot him seven times, including twice in the back of the head. Goad claimed that Clayton had parked next to Strange, who asked him for a drink. In response, Clayton had gotten out and murdered him without provocation. In February 1969, Clayton was convicted of first degree manslaughter for killing Strange, with the jury fixing his sentence at one year and one day in prison.

In October 1973, Johnny DeFries was convicted of first degree murder for killing 25-year-old John C. McVeigh during a fight over a pool game on December 8, 1972, and sentenced to life in prison. He escaped from prison in 1974 and 1978, both times spending roughly 11 months as a free man. DeFries was paroled in the late 1980s. While on parole, however, he was arrested for raping and sodomizing a 9-year-old girl at the home of her aunt-in-law, who was DeFries's daughter. After choosing to represent himself, DeFries was acquitted of first degree sodomy, but convicted of first degree rape. He was sentenced to life in prison without parole as a habitual offender. DeFries died in prison in September 2003.

In December 1997, Clarence Blevins was arrested for solicitation of murder. A search of his home uncovered live homemade explosives. In 1998, Blevins pleaded guilty to federal charges of solicitation of murder-for-hire and non-registration as a firearms manufacturer. He was sentenced to 13 years in prison on the first charge and 10 years on the second charge, to run concurrently. Blevins admitted to trying to have several people, including his ex-wife Barbara, killed.

In 2007, Blevins, who was scheduled for release in April 2009, told a prison informant that he would provide him explosives to murder his ex-wife, her boyfriend, and her neighbor. In a recorded conversation, Blevins said he wanted the crime to look like murder-suicide and be carried out while he was still in prison so he could have an alibi. He also told the informant that he could rape his ex-wife before killing her, as long as he was careful not to leave behind any DNA evidence. In 2009, Blevins was convicted of soliciting murder-for-hire and had 20 years added to his sentence. He claimed entrapment in an appeal. This was rejected, since Blevins already had a prior conviction for a similar offense and had initiated the conversation with other inmates before approaching the informant, who claimed to know a hit man. The informant had also repeatedly asked him whether he wanted to follow through on the plan, after which Blevins assured him that he did.

In 2019, Blevins, who was scheduled for release in 2026, filed a petition for compassionate release. After this request was denied by the warden, he filed a motion for compassionate release, citing his poor health and the COVID-19 pandemic. He filed another motion requesting a sentence reduction under the First Step Act. Blevins argued that he was no longer a danger to society, citing his good prison record. The government opposed the request, citing his history of violence. His involvement in Willie Brewster's murder was never mentioned, albeit the court noted that he'd been convicted of shooting and wounding his daughter prior to his 1998 conviction. In addition, Blevins's ex-wife and neighbor had expressed concerns for their safety in response to his petition. Ultimately, both of Blevins's petitions were rejected. He died in prison on October 4, 2021, at the age of 82.

== Legacy ==
A memorial marker was erected near the site of the shooting in 2016, by the City of Anniston Historic Trails Program. Brewster's name was placed on the Southern Poverty Law Center's list of Civil Rights Martyrs.
