= Secret Army =

Secret Army may refer to:

== History ==
- Secret Army (Belgium), an organisation in the Belgian Resistance during World War II
- Secret Army (France), or Armée secrète, an organisation in the French Resistance during WW II
- Secret Army, in the 1959–1975 Laotian Civil War, U.S.-trained anti-communist forces
- Organisation armée secrète, a French dissident paramilitary organization during the Algerian War
- Secret Army Organization, a 1970s right-wing paramilitary organization in Southern California, U.S.

== Other uses ==
- Secret Army (novel), a 2010 Henderson's Boys novel by Robert Muchamore
- Secret Army (TV series), a 1977–1979 British drama series
- The Secret Army, a 1972 documentary film about the Provisional IRA
