= 1974 Georgia lieutenant gubernatorial election =

- November 5, 1974
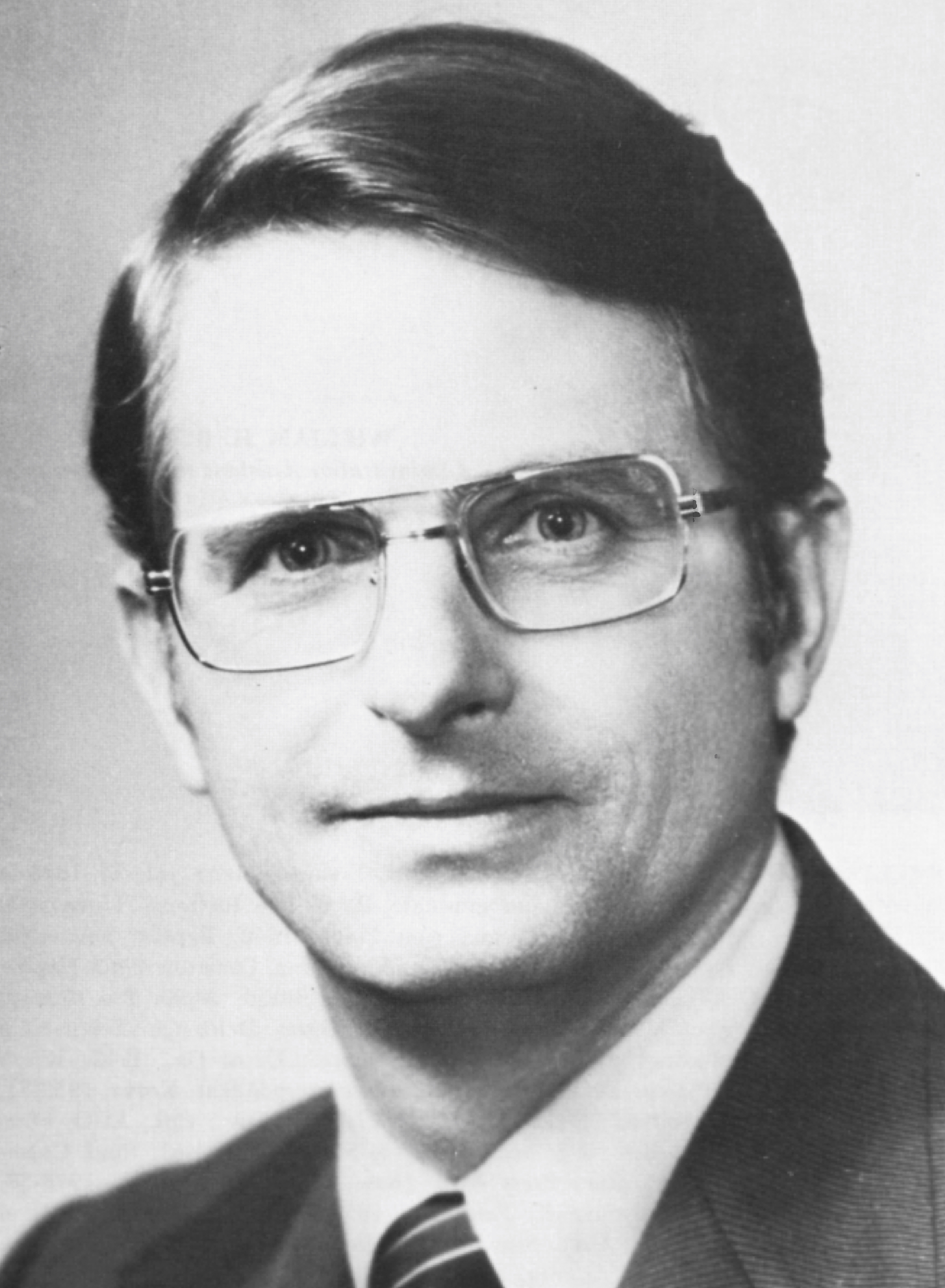

Nominee	Zell Miller	John Savage
Party	Democratic	Republican
Popular vote	597,598	305,161
Percentage	66.19%	33.80%
Lieutenant Governor before election
Lester Maddox
Democratic
Elected Lieutenant Governor
Zell Miller
Democratic

The 1974 Georgia lieutenant gubernatorial election was held on November 5, 1974, in order to elect the lieutenant governor of Georgia. Democratic nominee and former member of the Georgia State Senate Zell Miller defeated Republican nominee and incumbent member of the Georgia House of Representatives John Savage.

== Democratic primary ==
The Democratic primary election was held on August 13, 1974, but as no candidate received a majority of the vote, a run-off election was held between former member of the Georgia State Senate Zell Miller and Mary Hitt on September 3, 1974. Miller received a majority of the votes (60.82%) in the run-off election against Hitt, and was thus elected as the nominee for the general election.

=== Results ===
Candidate	First round		Run-off	
Candidate	Votes	%	Votes	%
Zell Miller	246,928	31.25	539,015	60.82
Mary Hitt	146,615	18.55	347,222	39.18
Max Cleland	136,103	17.22		
J. B. Stoner	73,449	9.29		
Frank E. Coggin	48,245	6.11		
Bill Laite	46,104	5.83		
Dennis Jackson	30,413	3.85		
Lamar Dailey Northcutt	29,847	3.78		
E. C. Mitcham	22,812	2.89		
Bill Salem	9,701	1.23		
Total	790,217	100.00	886,237	100.00

== Republican primary ==
The Republican primary election was held on August 13, 1974. Incumbent member of the Georgia House of Representatives John Savage received a majority of the votes (78.41%), and was thus elected as the nominee for the general election.

=== Results ===
1974 Republican lieutenant gubernatorial primary
Party	Candidate	Votes	%
Republican	John Savage	31,549	78.41%
Republican	Windell Whitmore	8,689	21.59%
Total votes		40,238	100.00%

== General election ==
On election day, November 5, 1974, Democratic nominee Zell Miller won the election by a margin of 292,437 votes against his opponent Republican nominee John Savage, thereby retaining Democratic control over the office of lieutenant governor. Miller was sworn in as the 8th lieutenant governor of Georgia on January 14, 1975.

=== Results ===
Georgia lieutenant gubernatorial election, 1974
Party	Candidate	Votes	%
Democratic	Zell Miller	597,598	66.19
Republican	Frank G. Miller	305,161	33.80
Write-in		167	0.01
Total votes		902,926	100.00
Democratic hold			
