= Tore Bjørgo =

Norwegian professor

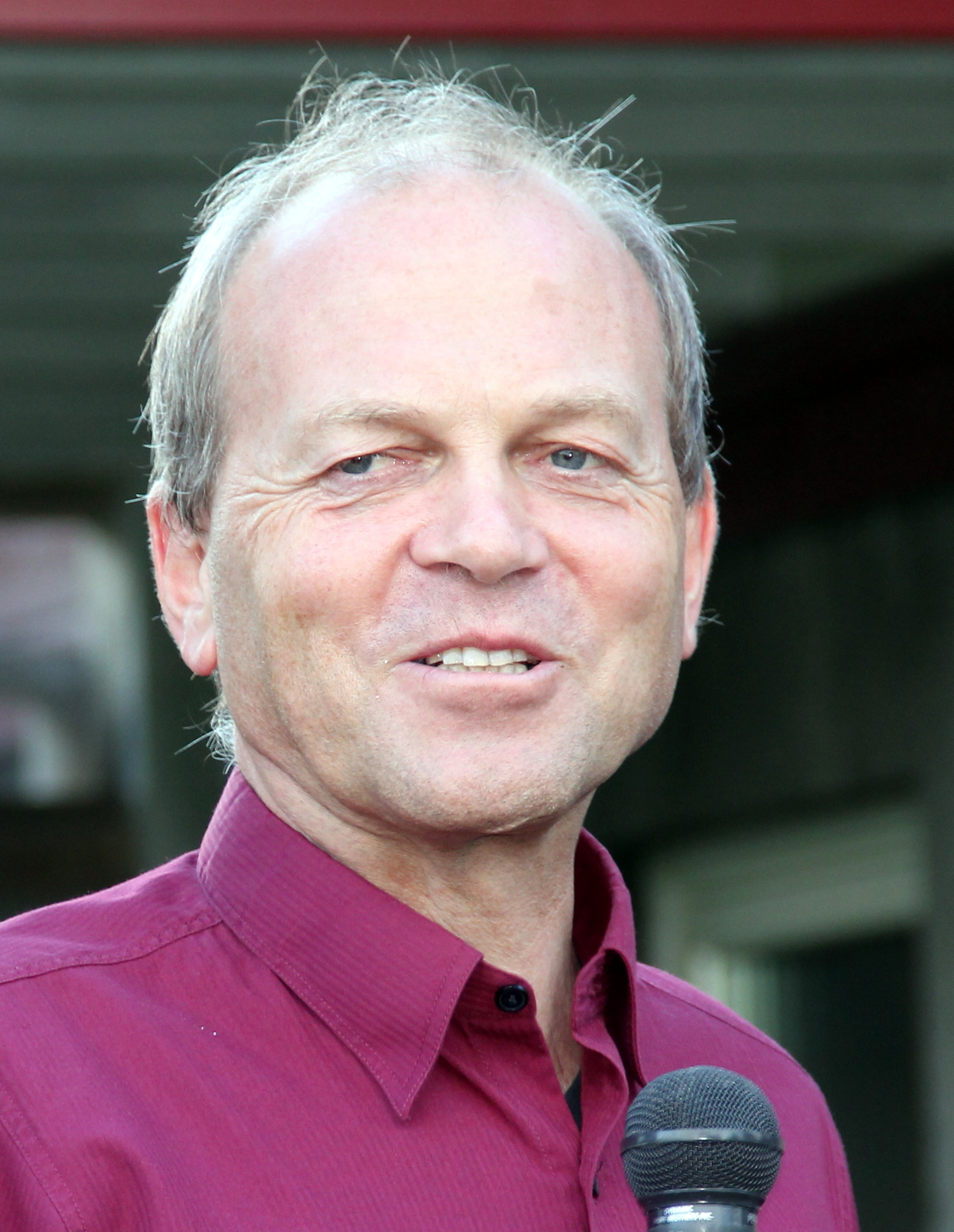
- Title: Professor and Director of the Center for Extremism Research
- Awards: Fulbright Scholar (2014)

Academic background
- Education: University of Leiden, University of Oslo

Academic work
- Sub-discipline: Terrorism, political science, criminology, sociology, police science
- Institutions: University of Oslo; Norwegian Police University College

Tore Bjørgo is a Norwegian social anthropologist and expert on the extreme right, and is professor at the University of Oslo and Director of the university's Center for Extremism Research: Right-Wing Extremism, Hate Crime and Political Violence (C‑REX). He is also professor at the Norwegian Police University College. He is a specialist in political extremism and terrorism, racist and right-wing violence, delinquent youth gangs, and international crime.

== Background ==
A social anthropologist by training, he received his cand.polit. graduate degree in Social Anthropology from the University of Oslo in 1987. In 1997 he was awarded a Ph.D. in Social Science from the University of Leiden in the Netherlands, where he was a research associate from 1991 to 1997. His doctoral dissertation, Racist and Right-Wing Violence in Scandinavia: Patterns, Perpetrators, and Responses, was published by Tano Aschehoug. A major thesis in his dissertation is that individuals become radicalized and racized after entering a racist environment (i.e., people do not enter a racist environment because they were racists in the first place).

From 1983 to 2004, Dr. Bjørgo worked as a researcher at the Norwegian Institute of International Affairs (NUPI); initially a Scientific Assistant, he was later promoted to Senior Researcher (1998–2004) and Research Professor (2004–2015). Since 2002, he has been the Coordinator of NUPI's Consortium for Research on Terrorism and International Crime. Dr. Bjørgo joined the Norwegian Police University College in 2004, where he served as a professor of Police Science (May 2004 to February 2016) as well as Research Director (February 2005 to June 2007). He was a visiting Fulbright scholar at the John Jay College of Criminal Justice, City University of New York, in the fall of 2014.

Dr. Bjørgo is currently a professor at the University of Oslo, where he is the director of the Center for Extremism Research: Right-Wing Extremism, Hate Crime and Political Violence (C-REX).

== Publications ==
Dr. Bjørgo has authored or edited nine books as well as hundreds journal articles and reports; a list of all works can be found in Cristin. The following is a selection of monographs and edited volumes.

=== Selected bibliography ===
- 1993: Bjørgo, T., and Heradstveit, D. Politisk terrorisme [Political Terrorism]. Oslo, Norway: Norges forskningsråd. ISBN 8251831024
- 1995: Bjørgo, T. (ed.) Terror from the Extreme Right. New York, NY: Routledge. ISBN 9780714646633
- 1997: Bjørgo, T. Racist and Right-Wing Violence in Scandinavia: Patterns, Perpetrators, and Responses. (Doctoral Dissertation). Oslo, Norway: Tano Aschehoug. ISBN 8251836654
- 1998: Kaplan, J., and Bjørgo, T. (ed.) Nation and Race: The Developing Euro-American Racist Subculture. Boston, MA: Northeastern University Press. ISBN 1555533310
- 1999: Bjørgo, T., and Carlsson, Y. Vold, rasisme og ungdomsgjenger: Forebygging og bekjempelse [Violence, Racism and Youth: Prevention and Combat]. Oslo, Norway: Tano Aschehoug. ISBN 9788251837323
- 2005: Bjørgo, T. (ed.) Root Causes of Terrorism: Myths, Reality and Ways Forward. New York, NY: Routledge. ISBN 0415351499
- 2009: Bjørgo, T., and Horgan, J. (eds.) Leaving Terrorism Behind: Individual and Collective Disengagement. New York, NY: Routledge. ISBN 9780415776677
- 2013: Bjørgo, T. Strategies for Preventing Terrorism. New York, NY: Palgrave Macmillan. ISBN 9781137355072
