= Ed Fields =

American white supremacist (born 1932)

- Fields in 1975
- Born: Edward Reed Fields; September 30, 1932 (age 94); Chicago, Illinois, U.S.
- Education: Palmer College of Chiropractic
- Occupations: Activist, newspaper editor, publisher
- Years active: 1946–2008
- Notable work: The Thunderbolt
- Political party: National States' Rights (1958–1983)
- Spouse: Dolores Moeller (m. 1954)

Edward Reed Fields (born September 30, 1932) is an American white supremacist activist and newspaper publisher. A fascist activist from his teenage years, Fields helped found the National States' Rights Party (NSRP), a white supremacist political party, and was involved in it until he was ousted in 1983. He was for several decades the editor of the white supremacist newspaper The Thunderbolt, originally the newspaper of the NSRP; he later renamed it The Truth at Last. The newspaper ceased when Fields retired from political activism in 2008.

== Early life ==
Fields in 1950 at Marist College

Edward Reed Fields was born on September 30, 1932 in Chicago, Illinois. He was the son of Irwin J. Fields, a corporate executive. His parents were both practicing Catholics, and were from a middle class background. He served as an altar boy and was known in his youth for his religious devotion.

He moved at an early age to Atlanta, Georgia. He was raised in Marietta, Georgia. He attended the Marist School, a private Catholic school that had a substantial non-Catholic population. Classmates later recalled him as "very quiet"; he went by the nickname "Old Ed". He was a classmate and neighbor of future murderer Michael Thevis.

== White supremacy ==
He first became interested in Nazism at the age of 13. He wrote an antisemitic pamphlet at that age, titled The Jew Comes to America, and formed a group supporting Eugene Talmadge. Aged 14, he was reprimanded by his Catholic school for attempting to recruit his fellow students into a Nazi organization that he created, the Black Front. His classmates later said he was obsessed with purported Jewish control of Hollywood, and refused to see movies with Jewish star actors.

At age 14 he joined the Columbians, a paramilitary fascist organization. When the founder of the group, Emory Burke, was arrested and later sentenced for plotting a fascist takeover of Georgia, Fields was not implicated in the plot, but he and several others formed a "Free Emory Burke Committee". This did not work. Fields befriended George Van Horn Moseley, a military officer involved with a wide white supremacist network. Fields later joined the American Anti-Communist Society in Atlanta, which was short lived. Fields was an associate of James H. Madole, the leader of the National Renaissance Party (NRP), and frequently corresponded with him and collaborated with the NRP.

In 1951, Fields enlisted in the Naval Air Force, but was discharged due to "unsuitability". The next year, he attempted to enlist in the Naval Reserve, but due to his attempting to recruit other soldiers to the far-right cause, his enlistment was cancelled. The Navy then scheduled a medical assessment, which in 1952 diagnosed Fields as: "Abnormal Psychiatric—Paranoid personality—is not qualified for induction". The report further stated that Fields was "seriously sick and his chances of eventually becoming frankly insane are excellent". The assessing doctor was so concerned by Fields that he privately contacted the FBI and suggested they find someone who could involuntarily commit him. They did not. An antifascist infiltrator into the NRP, Emmanuel Trujillo, said of him, in contrast to Stoner, that Fields was "full of hate but has no idea why [...] It's a shame that his mind is so messed up".

Fields attended law school in Atlanta. In 1952, Fields and J. B. Stoner co-founded the Christian Anti-Jewish Party (originally the Stoner Anti-Jewish Party). Stoner was, like Fields at the time, a law student. Fields was the one to discover that Emmanuel Trujillo, a leading member of the NRP, was actually an antifascist infiltrator, when in 1954 he walked into his apartment and found it covered in pictures of Joseph Stalin and other communist figures. Madole then purged Trujillo from the party.

In 1953 Fields transferred to the Palmer College of Chiropractic in Iowa. While living in Iowa he created an "Anti-Jew Week" (held February 21 to February 28), and was investigated by the local police after he began marking local Jewish-owned businesses with stickers. He was repeatedly arrested for putting up antisemitic signs.

He married Dolores Moeller in November 1954. Fields graduated from Palmer College in 1956, and returned to active political involvement. He never practiced as a chiropractor. He began working with the Citizens' Councils. He founded the United White Party In 1956.

=== National States' Rights Party ===
Fields addressing a convention in Jacksonville in 1969

In 1958, after a merge with another white supremacist group, the States' Rights Party, Fields's UWP became the National States' Rights Party. Fields edited and wrote for the party's newspaper, The Thunderbolt. It absorbed a number of other white supremacist groups. In 1964 the group underwent a minor schism when Fields's faction of the group wanted to change their rules on uniforms, feeling that the uniform rules hurt the party; James R. McDaniels felt otherwise, and Fields accused him of wanting to be the NSRP's only leader. The group's mailing list went with McDaniel's schism, the American States Rights Party. Fields and Stoner's NSRP moved to Augusta, Georgia. He and Stoner later co-lead the party.

Fields and the National States' Rights Party in 1963 were enlisted by Alabama Gov. George Wallace and state public safety chief Albert Lingo to create pretexts that Wallace used to order closed public schools that were slated for integration and to deploy state troopers—over the objections of local authorities—in communities otherwise determined to comply with federal court orders to desegregate.

Fields had a court case against James K. Warner, a former member of the NSRP, who he accused of stealing the NSRP's mailing list. Fields settled out of court, but the case permanently ruined Warner's reputation among neo-Nazis (stealing a mailing list was considered "an unforgivable sin" among white supremacists). During this time period, Fields wrote to print publications detailing his beliefs, for instance in 1969 a letter by Fields was published in Playboy, alleging, "we will never have law and order in America until all Negroes are deported back to Africa and completely removed from this nation that was founded and built by the great white race."

In 1976, following Alabama Attorney General Bill Baxley's opening of prosecution against Robert Edward Chambliss, who was one of the bombers of the 16th Street Baptist Church in Birmingham, Fields wrote a letter to Baxley, referring to him as an "honorary nigger" and threatening to assassinate him. Baxley responded with his own letter the following day, telling Fields, "My response to your letter of February 19, 1976, is - kiss my ass." By 1981 he was also leading a Ku Klux Klan group, the New Order Klan.

=== Later career ===
Following J. B. Stoner's imprisonment for his involvement in the 1958 Bethel Baptist Church bombing, Fields lost the trust of many party members, largely due to his increasing activity with the Ku Klux Klan and decreasing involvement with the party, and was expelled from the party in August 1983. He continued publishing The Thunderbolt, but changed the newspaper's name to The Truth at Last.

Fields founded the white supremacist America First Party in 1993, and spoke at the Populist Party's 1994 convention. He continued associating with a range of far-right groups.

Fields attended the 2001 funeral of Klansman Byron De La Beckwith, who murdered civil rights activist Medgar Evers. He was a member of the neo-Nazi organization the National Alliance, though left to join Kevin Alfred Strom's schism organization the National Vanguard in 2005.

In 2008, Fields retired from politics.
