= Radical Religion in America =

1997 book by Jeffrey Kaplan

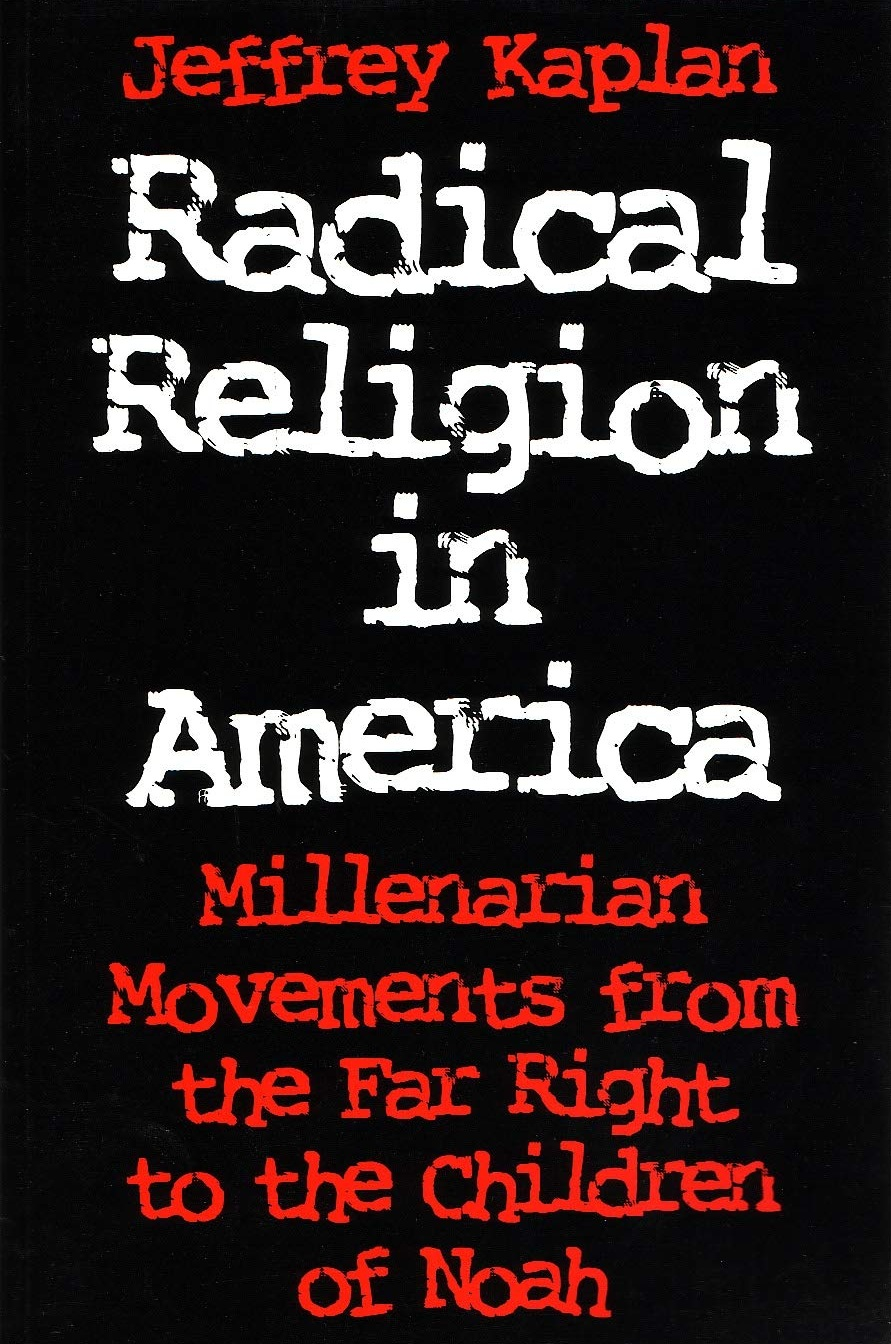
- Cover of the first edition
- Author: Jeffrey Kaplan
- Language: English
- Series: Religion & Politics
- Subject: Millenarian religion in the United States
- Publisher: Syracuse University Press
- Publication date: 1997
- Publication place: United States
- Media type: Print (hardcover and paperback)
- Pages: 245
- ISBN: 0-8156-2687-8
- OCLC: 34926843
- Dewey Decimal: 291.23
- LC Class: BL503.2 .K37 1997

Radical Religion in America: Millenarian Movements from the Far Right to the Children of Noah is a 1997 book by Jeffrey Kaplan. It was published by Syracuse University Press, part of their Religion & Politics series. It focuses on radical millenarian religious groups in the United States, those who believe strongly in an imminent apocalypse. This includes white supremacist religion like Christian Identity and racial paganism, but also the B'nai Noah. The book's foreword was written by Michael Barkun. The book received a largely positive reception, with praise for the information it provided, though reception to some of Kaplan's interpretations was more mixed.

== Background and publication history ==
At the time of the Radical Religion in America's publication, its author Jeffrey Kaplan worked as an assistant professor in the social sciences department at the Arctic Sivunmun Ilisagvik College in Alaska. The book was published by Syracuse University Press in 1997. This first edition was 245 pages long. It was part of the publisher's Religion & Politics series. The book is based in part off of interviews with those involved as well as the already existing literature.

== Contents ==
The foreword was written by Michael Barkun. In an introduction, Kaplan discusses apocalyptic millenarianism, the idea of apocalyptic events bringing a greater salvation. He notes the history of these beliefs and their common association with violence, including the Waco siege. The book is mainly a study of three movements that are part of what Kaplan calls the "American millenial community": the white supremacist Christian movement Christian Identity, pagan movements that white supremacists often adhere to, Odinism and Ásatrú, and the pro-Jewish B'nai Noah, who reject Christianity and follow Jewish law. Contending that they are all seekers who are on "an endless quest for the ultimate answer to society’s ills", he argues that the unifying trait of these distinct groups is their unwavering belief in the imminent end of the world.

He draws from sociologist Colin Campbell's concept of the "cultic milieu". Kaplan argues that despite the widespread awareness of far-right groups, the general public is largely unaware of their histories. Kaplan argues that all these movements are basically incompetent and self-defeating, and therefore mostly benign. He notes an ideological tendency towards violence, though says this is mostly rhetorical and has rarely extended into action. He notes exceptions to this, like the Order. He concludes that generally "the right wing talks a better revolution than it is prepared to fight." In another chapter, he discusses the anti-cult movement, and discusses the relationship between these organizations and the groups they follow. He categorizes the anti-hate "watchdog" groups against the far right as being part of the anti-cult movement. It contains a bibliography and an index.

== Reception ==
The amount of information provided in the book was praised. Brad Whitsel in Review of Religious Research called it "an innovative and thought-provoking work", while Catherine Wessinger said the book's great strength was in Kaplan's approach, which she said was a "his ability to discern and describe the humanity on both sides of highly polarized conflicts". Bill Piekarski for the Library Journal said the book was, for an academic study, "unusually engagingly written", and praised the research and detail provided, recommending it to all libraries. Dennis Winters for Booklist praised the work, saying Kaplan managed to balance academic detachment but "never lets us forget that these are real people".

Kaplan's interpretations received a more mixed reception. Frank Lechner was more critical, saying that while the book could be useful to sociologists, it was insufficiently dispassionate about the subject and did not draw on enough of the relevant literature. Sociologist Stuart A. Wright complimented Radical Religion in America's coverage of the B'nai Noah and Odinism and Ásatrú, noting that there had been little scholarship previously published about these two movements; however, he found the argument that violence was rare among these groups to be unconvincing, but agreed that it was overstated. Thomas Robbins found this thesis provocative and perhaps exaggerated, but said Kaplan's scholarship may be "an acquired taste; if so, this reviewer has certainly acquired it". He described it as an important study of the topic, "even if one disputes the author's key inferences". In 2013, Rob Walsh for the Library Journal said it was an "exceptional study" for "clos[ing] the gap" on the "dearth of research about the histories, inner workings, and belief systems of radical religion movements".
