= Katrine Fangen =

Norwegian sociologist, academic, and author

- Occupations: Sociologist, academic, and author

Academic background
- Education: MA (Magister Artium) in Sociology; PhD (Dr. Polit.) in Sociology
- Alma mater: University of Oslo (UiO)
- Thesis: Pride and Power: A Sociological Interpretation of Norwegian radical nationalist underground movement (2001)

Academic work
- Institutions: Department of Sociology and Human Geography, University of Oslo; Center for Research on Extremism (C-REX)
- Notable works: En bok om nynazister (2022)

Katrine Fangen is a Norwegian sociologist, academic, and author. She is a professor in the Department of Sociology and Human Geography at the University of Oslo (UiO) in Norway, and a Thematic Leader at the Center for Research on Extremism (C-REX) for Ideology & Identity and Gender & Extremism research areas.

Fangen's research centers on the intersections of nationalism, right-wing populism, migration and social movements. She has authored books including En bok om nynazisme, Deltagende observasjon, Identitet og praksis: etnisitet, klasse og kjønn blant somaliere i Norge, Inclusion and Exclusion of Young Adult Migrants in Europe: Barriers and Bridges, and Young Migrants: Exclusion and Belonging in Europe. For her doctoral thesis, she received His Majesty the King's Gold Medal for Excellent Young Researchers from the UiO in 2000.

Fangen was Chair of the Sociology Panel at the Independent Research Fund Denmark from 2022 to 2024. She served as the editor of the Nordic Journal of Youth Research (YOUNG) from 2006 to 2019, with the role of main editor from 2014 to 2019 and was a co-editor of the journal Social Inclusion from 2012 to 2016.

== Education ==
Fangen completed a master's degree (Magister Artium) in Sociology from the Department of Sociology at the UiO in 1992 with a thesis based on Eastern Germany at the time of the reunification of the two German states in 1990. She conducted life-story interviews with young communists, anarchists and neo-Nazis about the past, present and future. In 2000, she received a Ph.D. from the same institution's Department of Sociology and Human Geography.

== Career ==
Fangen began her career in 1993 as an assistant professor managing the youth sociology program at Sogn og Fjordane University College in Norway. From 1993 to 1995, she served as a Research Fellow for the UNGforsk program, focusing on right-wing extremists in Norway and continued research on this topic during her PhD fellowship from 1995 to 1999 at the University of Oslo. Subsequently, she worked as a Researcher II in the migration research group at FAFO in Oslo until 2003. She then led a mental health research project among Norwegian Somalis in 2003 for a year before taking a postdoc position at the UiO from 2004 to 2008, where she researched identity, citizenship, and political participation among Norwegian Somalis. She also led the EUMARGINS project, funded by the EU's 7th Framework Programme, as a Principal Investigator and Senior Researcher from 2008 to 2010, investigating social exclusion and inclusion of young adult immigrants in Europe involving institutions from seven European countries. In 2010, she was appointed as an associate professor, and since 2011, she has been a professor in the Department of Sociology and Human Geography at the UiO.

Since 2016, she has been the Thematic Leader at C-REX for Ideology & Identity and Gender & Extremism research areas, Chair of the Sociology Panel in the Independent Research Fund Denmark from October 2022 until June 2024, Member of the committee of research ethics at OsloMet University since 2020, and Deputy Member of the scientific boards of the Holocaust Centre as well as Institute for Social Research. In 2024, she became Acting Director of the UiO-democracy initiative.

== Research ==
Fangen's research has examined how transnational ideas and political discourses shape extremist, populist and anti-migration movements. Her doctoral work explored the Norwegian rightwing extremist underground movement in 1990s Norway, analyzed by her fieldwork and cultural and modernization theories. This underground movement consisted of three fronts—paramilitary groups, National Socialist skinheads, and ideological fronts—that, despite varying lifestyles and beliefs, united to combat militant anti-fascists. Moreover, her study looked into how the right-wing skinhead subculture, known for its militant appearance and Nazi gestures, differed from WWII Nazism by incorporating elements of rebellion and opposition to authority while still directing aggression towards specific ethnic and political groups.

In the period 1999–2011, Fangen primarily conducted migration research. An article from this time examined the multi-dimensional nature of social exclusion among young adult immigrants, focusing on different social arenas and combining macro and micro research perspectives to provide a complete understanding. In 2011, she shifted her primary focus to variants of right-wing populism, anti-migration sentiments, and the far-right in general. Alongside Vaage, she analyzed the evolution of the Norwegian Progress Party's immigration rhetoric following its entry into a coalition government in 2013. Their study highlighted the party's need to moderate its stance for broader acceptance while simultaneously risking the alienation of core voters. In another article, she and Brastad Dammen assessed the role of global political entities in migration framed by various political actors in Norway, highlighting the use of anti-globalism by radicals to oppose refugee reception and the support for global agreements by mainstream actors. In a 2024 publication, she discussed how transnational ideas from both mainstream and alternative sources influence anti-migration movements in Norway.

In addition to her thesis, Fangen has contributed to studies on Germany, as well as her studies of individuals and groups in the Norwegian context. Her and Lichtenberg's study analyzed family policies, gender roles, and anti-Muslim views in German far-right parties and movements, highlighting both similarities and differences within the far-right. In 2024, her article with Weisskircher highlighted that while far-right actors in Germany and Norway endorsed transnational activities, only a few actively engaged in them, balancing strategic benefits with concerns about extremism and conflict.

=== Works ===
In 2022, a new edition of Fangen's first book, En bok om nynazister, originally published as her PhD thesis in 2000, explored the evolution of the neo-Nazi milieu in Norway, its shift towards Islamophobia, and the continued relevance of understanding right-wing extremism in polarized and internet-driven landscape.

Fangen's book, Deltagende observasjon, published in 2004, provided an introduction to participant observation, covering fieldwork challenges, theoretical perspectives, and the processes of analysis and publication. Its second edition, published in 2010, featured new content on web ethnography, multi-local fieldwork, comparative studies, and organizational research. She also authored, Identity and practice - ethnicity, class and gender among Somalis in Norway in 2008, focusing on how Somalis in Norway navigate identity, adaptation, and participation in Norwegian society through interviews and focus groups. Kirsten Lauritsen remarked, "Katrine Fangen has written an important book for anyone who wants to understand more about the interaction between so-called "ethnic Norwegians" and Somalis in Norway than what the media typically provides."

In 2010, Fangen, Mohn and Fossan edited the book, Inclusion and Exclusion of Young Adult Migrants in Europe, which analyzed the inclusion and exclusion of young adult immigrants across various European regions. Anna Triandafyllidou, in her review of the book, stated, "This book is interesting and useful to the reader who seeks to gain a solid background knowledge on migration, migrant youth and integration issues across Europe. It covers an important and wide spectrum of national experiences and policies of social inclusion and exclusion processes that migrant youth face in Europe." She then co-edited, Young Migrants: Exclusion and Belonging in Europe in 2012, with Thomas Johansson and Nils Hammarén. This book, being a part of the book series, Migration, Diasporas and Citizenship, discussed the life experiences of young adult immigrants in Europe, as transmitted by the young adults themselves.

== Awards and honors ==
- 2000 – His Majesty the King's gold medal for Excellent Young Researchers, UiO

== Bibliography ==
=== Books ===
- Deltagende observasjon (2004) ISBN 978-82-450-1001-5
- Identitet og praksis: etnisitet, klasse og kjønn blant somaliere i Norge (2008) ISBN 978-82-13-10009-0
- Inclusion and Exclusion of Young Adult Migrants in Europe: Barriers and Bridges (Research in Migration and Ethnic Relations) (2010) ISBN 978-1-4094-0420-0
- Pride and Power: A Sociological Analysis of Norwegian neo-Nazis - A Qualitative Study (2011) ISBN 978-3-8443-1832-6
- Mange ulike metoder (2011) ISBN 978-82-05-41391-7
- Young Migrants: Exclusion and Belonging in Europe (Migration, Diasporas and Citizenship) (2012) ISBN 978-0-230-29887-3
- En bok om nynazister (originally published 2001; reprinted 2022) ISBN 978-82-15-00082-4

=== Selected articles ===
- Fangen, K. (1998). Living out our Ethnic Instincts. Ideological Beliefs among Right-Wing Activists in Norway.
- Fangen, K. (1998). Right-wing skinheads-Nostalgia and binary oppositions. Young, 6(3), 33–49.
- Fangen, K. (2006). Humiliation experienced by Somali refugees in Norway. Journal of refugee studies, 19(1), 69–93.
- Fangen, K. (2010). Social exclusion and inclusion of young immigrants: Presentation of an analytical framework. Young, 18(2), 133–156.
- Fangen, K., & Vaage, M. (2018). “The immigration problem” and Norwegian right-wing politicians. New Political Science, 40(3), 459–476.
