= The Thunderbolt (newspaper) =

American white supremacist newspaper

- The White Man's Viewpoint

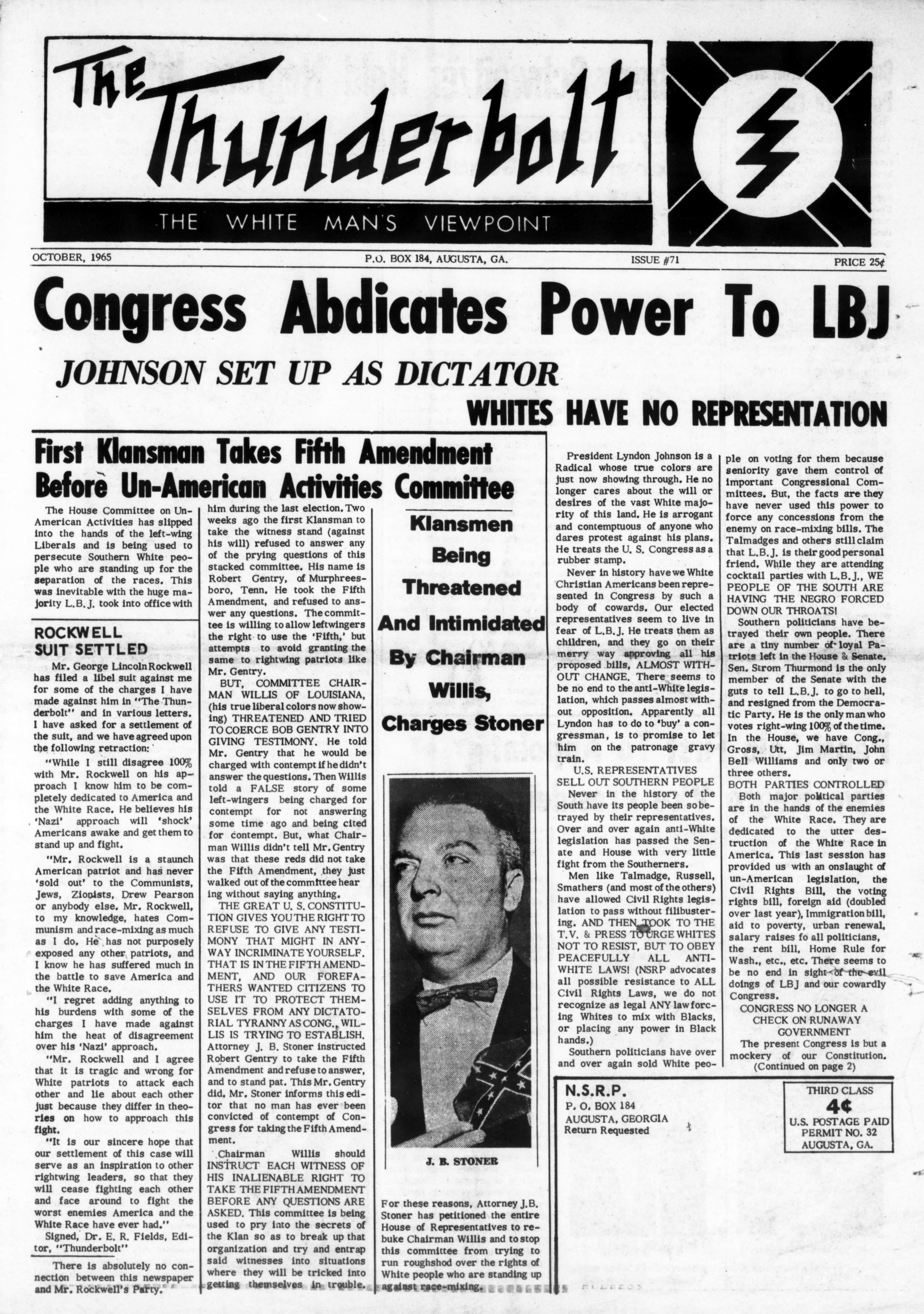
- First page of the October 1965 issue, no. 71
- Type: Monthly newspaper
- Publisher: Columbians Incorporated (1946); National States' Rights Party (1958–1983); Ed Fields (1983–2008)
- Editor: Ed Fields
- Founded: August 1946 (under the Columbians) July 1958 (under the NSRP)
- Ceased publication: 2008
- Political alignment: Neo-Nazism
- Language: English
- Headquarters: Marietta, Georgia
- Country: United States
- Circulation: 25,000 (as of 1960s)
- ISSN: 0040-6643
- OCLC number: 1787557

The Thunderbolt, named The Truth at Last from 1988 on, was an American white supremacist tabloid newspaper. For most of the paper's life, it was edited by Ed Fields. The Thunderbolt was established in 1946 as the periodical of the white supremacist Columbians Incorporated movement, but was abandoned after 2 issues. It was brought back in 1958 as the party outlet of the National States' Rights Party (NSRP). After Fields was ousted from the NSRP in 1983, he continued publishing it independently, renaming it the The Truth At Last in 1988. It ceased publication in 2008 when Fields retired from politics. The Anti-Defamation League described it as, until the 1980s, the "most widely read publication among the Klans and other hate groups".

As both The Truth At Last and The Thunderbolt, it espoused anti-black and antisemitic views, including Holocaust denial and other conspiracy theories. It featured news internal to the far-right movement, as well as national and international news with a white supremacist bent; scholars John George and Laird Wilcox described it as seeming "almost a parody" of antisemitism in how extreme it was. It was also known for repeatedly accusing other white racist activists of secretly working for the American government or "the Jews".

== Contents and circulation ==
The Thunderbolt was a tabloid newspaper. It featured national and international news, as well as internal NSRP political news with a white supremacist bent. In content it was similar to The Klansman, another white supremacist periodical, but focused more on news. The Thunderbolt had ties to several other white supremacist groups in the United States, but also in Europe; John Tyndall's white supremacist magazine Spearhead listed it as an "allied publication". Its slogan was "The White Man's Viewpoint" for many years. As of 2000, its slogan was "News Suppressed by the Daily Press". The paper was issued monthly. Many of its issues were undated, only numbered.

The Anti-Defamation League described it as, until the 1980s, the "most widely read publication among the Klans and other hate groups". In the 1960s, the paper had a circulation of 25,000. Fields claimed that by 1970 the paper had the strongest subscriber base in Alabama, California, and Florida, but with subscribers in all fifty states. As of 2000, it was published in Marietta, Georgia.

== History ==
The Thunderbolt was originally established in August 1946. It was founded as the newspaper of the white supremacist Columbians Incorporated movement; this iteration of the newspaper lasted two issues before being abandoned.

It was resurrected 12 years later in July 1958 as the party outlet of J. B. Stoner's National States' Rights Party (NSRP), founded that year (Stoner had been affiliated with the Columbians). The NSRP was a neo-Nazi political party; only white Christian Americans could join, and membership in other white racist or right-wing groups was disallowed. In terms of membership it was the largest and most stable neo-Nazi group in the United States of the time. It was edited by Ed Fields, a founder of the NSRP. He was its editor and handled the publishing of The Thunderbolt. For a time, neo-Nazi James K. Warner was associate editor. In 1981, Frazier Glenn Miller Jr. made the paper the official one of his branch of the Ku Klux Klan.

In the 1980s, the NSRP underwent a schism that impacted The Thunderbolt. Fields was ousted from the NSRP in 1983, and Jerry Ray (the brother of James Earl Ray) took over leadership. One reason for the split was that other members alleged that Fields put more effort into the newspaper than the NSRP. After legal action, Fields was able to retake control of The Thunderbolt as part of an out of court settlement with the current leaders of the NSRP. Since he had been ousted, it proceeded to lose many of the subscribers it had while under NSRP control.

In 1988, Fields proceeded to change the newspaper's name to The Truth at Last. The content and ideology of the paper stayed identical. The NSRP lost many members after Fields's exit, and soon ceased to exist. Fields eventually launched another white supremacist political group, the America First Party. By early 1991, there had been 348 issues of the paper published. It was sent free of cost to all members of the Georgia General Assembly in the 1990s.

The paper ceased in 2008 when Fields retired from politics. He proceeded to donate its subscription list to David Duke's periodical, The David Duke Report.

== Ideology and politics ==
Scholars Betty A. Dobratz and Stephanie L. Shanks-Meile described it as a "white racialist" newspaper; while Peter Applebome described it as "neo-Nazi" and "white supremacist". The paper espoused the antisemitic and anti-black views of the NSRP, and at times called for violent acts. In the 1990s, Fields denied that the paper was "extremist" but described himself as a "racialist".

The paper claimed the Federal Bureau of Investigation and J. Edgar Hoover were part of a "Jewish-Communist conspiracy" against whites. Scholars John George and Laird Wilcox described it as "almost satirical after one surmounts the initial shock", writing that it was so overdone in its antisemitism that it seemed "almost a parody". The newspaper disavowed interracial marriage; one issue reprinted a National Alliance cartoon that shows a man teargassing an interracial couple. Writers for The Truth at Last cited the works of Arthur Jensen to claim that scientific racism was legitimate and that IQ differences between black and white Americans were genetic, not environmental. On slavery, the paper said that the African slaves had benefited from their enslavement.

The newspaper attacked abortion, but also attacked anti-abortion activists because the writers believed abortion should be used to reduce the black population. Writers for The Truth at Last also denied the Holocaust. The newspaper also wrote often about instances of crime against white people by black people, alleging that this was suppressed by the mainstream media.

It disavowed Barry Goldwater as a presidential candidate due to his Jewish heritage; when Richard Nixon was elected, the paper disavowed him too, and called for his impeachment, accusing him of promoting "race-mixing". The paper expressed support for Ronald Reagan, though they later expressed regret for this, citing him as working against the extreme-right and supporting affirmative action. It extensively criticized Bill Clinton while he was in office. They praised David Duke for "mainstreaming" the far-right, and supported Pat Buchanan's candidacy for president. In 2000, it ran a cover story on Democratic George congressional candidate Roger Kahn, then running against incumbent Bob Barr; the paper praised Barr in religious terms and called Kahn's campaign "all Jewish". This created a minor controversy, and Barr denounced the paper in response.

=== Disputes with other white supremacists ===
The paper was involved in numerous disputes within the white racist moment. It was known for claiming to expose that a wide variety of enemies of the NSRP were secretly Jewish or working for "the Jews"; this included anti-racist activists, but also other white supremacists that the NSRP did not like. John George and Laird Wilcox wrote that "writers for The Thunderbolt, principally Fields, spent considerable energy trying to prove that virtually everyone the NSRP didn't like and who wasn't black was really a crypto-Jew."

In one instance they accused Ku Klux Klan member Bill Wilkinson of being an FBI informant. In 1962, Fields accused George Lincoln Rockwell, the founder of the American Nazi Party, of faking his Nazism and secretly working for Jews. Rockwell proceeded to sue Fields for libel; the case was settled out of court three years later, and Fields was forced to print a retraction. Writing for the paper, Fields accused white supremacist terrorist leader Robert Jay Mathews of secretly working for the CIA.
