= National States' Rights Party =

American political party (1958–1987)

- Flag of the National States' Rights Party, based on the Confederate battle flag
- Leader: Ed Fields; J. B. Stoner
- Founder: Ed Fields; J. B. Stoner
- Founded: 1958
- Dissolved: 1987
- Headquarters: Knoxville, Tennessee
- Newspaper: The Thunderbolt
- Membership (1970): 150
- Ideology: Neo-Confederatism; White supremacy
- Political position: Far-right
- Colors: Red, blue, and white (party and flag colors)

The National States' Rights Party was a white supremacist political party that briefly played a role in the politics of the United States.

== Foundation ==
Founded in 1958 in Knoxville, Tennessee, by Ed Fields, a 26-year-old chiropractor and supporter of J. B. Stoner, the party was based on white supremacy and opposition to racial integration with African Americans. Party officials argued for states' rights against the advance of the civil rights movement, and the organization established relations with the Ku Klux Klan and Minutemen. Although a white supremacist movement, its messaging was never openly neo-Nazi in the way that its successors in the American Nazi Party were.

Stoner, who served three years in prison for bombing the Bethel Baptist Church in Birmingham, Alabama, was the party's chairman. The party produced a newspaper, The Thunderbolt, which was edited by Fields. In 1958, the party's first year, five men with links to the NSRP were indicted for their participation in the Hebrew Benevolent Congregation Temple bombing in Atlanta.

On December 27, 1963, Edward Fields was brought to the US Secret Service's attention as a possible threat against protected individuals. This was divulged as part of the JFK file release. The FBI considered that Fields was "one step removed from being insane."

== Development ==
During the 1960 presidential election, at a secret meeting held in a rural lodge near Dayton, Ohio, the NSRP nominated Governor of Arkansas Orval Faubus for President and retired U.S. Navy Rear Admiral John G. Crommelin of Alabama for Vice President. Faubus, however, did not campaign on this ticket actively, and won only 0.07% of the vote (best in his native Arkansas: 6.76%). The party also ran in the 1964 presidential election, nominating John Kasper for President and Stoner for Vice President, although they won only 0.01%, or less than 7,000 votes.

In 1961, Faubus denounced the NSRP for having described the Eichmann trial as a "giant propaganda hoax." Faubus said that he had first-hand experience with German atrocities and that his own unit, the 35th Infantry Division, had viewed some of the evidence of Eichmann's crimes. He dismissed defenders of Adolf Eichmann as either "misguided fools or deliberate liars."

The party began to expand its operations and moved to new headquarters in Birmingham in 1960. Supporters were soon kitted out in the party uniform of white shirts, black pants and ties and armbands bearing the Thunderbolt version of the Wolfsangel. Thunderbolt itself gained a circulation of 15,000 in the late 1960s and the party became active in rallies across the United States, with events in Baltimore, Maryland, in 1966 being particularly notorious because five leading members were imprisoned for inciting riots. The Federal Bureau of Investigation targeted the NSRP under its COINTELPRO-WHITE HATE program.

=== International contacts ===
The party attempted to gain international contacts, and during the 1970s took part in annual international neo-Nazi rallies at Diksmuide in Belgium, alongside such groups as the Belgian Order of Flemish Militants and the British League of Saint George. Before that, the party had been close to the British extremist leader John Tyndall and his Greater Britain Movement after Tyndall failed in his attempts to forge links with American Nazi Party leader George Lincoln Rockwell. The Finnish Patriotic Popular Front and later National Democratic Party led by Pekka Siitoin were in cooperation with Stoner and Fields, and Siitoin published material from Thunderbolt in Finnish in his parties' magazines.

=== Violence ===
Five men with connections to the NSRP perpetrated the 1958 Hebrew Benevolent Congregation Temple bombing in Atlanta, Georgia.

In 1965, three men with NSRP ties murdered Willie Brewster, a black man, as they drove past him on Alabama State Route 202 outside Anniston, Alabama. Shortly before killing Brewster, the three had attended a NSRP rally, where Reverend Connie Lynch of California decried the desegregation of Anniston High School and urged members to whatever it took to stop desegregation: "If it takes killing to get the Negroes out of the white man's streets and to protect our constitutional rights, I say, yes, kill them."

In 1964, George Lincoln Rockwell informed the FBI that Fields had told him that a group of right-wing former U.S. military officers, allegedly including Crommelin, Pedro del Valle, and William Potter Gale, were conspiring to overthrow the federal government. Fields opposed the plot and told Rockwell that he was doing everything he could to dissuade those involved. However, Rockwell said he had no choice but to report the conspiracy, fearing that it would cause irreparable damage to the far-right cause in the United States.

=== Presidential tickets ===
Year	Presidential nominee	Home state	Previous positions	Vice presidential nominee	Home state	Previous positions	Votes	Notes
1960	Orval Faubus	Arkansas	Governor of Arkansas (1955–1967)	John G. Crommelin	Alabama	United States Navy Rear Admiral; Candidate for United States Senator from Alabama (1950, 1954, 1956)	44,984 (0.07%); 0 EV	
1964	John Kasper	Tennessee	Activist; Member of the Ku Klux Klan	J. B. Stoner	Georgia	National Party Chairman; Candidate for Tennessee's 3rd congressional district (1948)	6,953 (<0.1%); 0 EV	

== Decline ==
The party's influence declined in the 1970s, as Fields began to devote more of his energies to the Ku Klux Klan. As a result, in April 1976, U.S. Attorney General Edward H. Levi concluded an FBI investigation into the group after it was decided that they posed no threat.

The NSRP began its terminal decline when Stoner was convicted for a bombing in 1980. Without his leadership, the party descended into factionalism, and in August 1983, Fields was expelled for spending too much time in the Klan. Jerry Ray, the brother of Martin Luther King Jr. assassin James Earl Ray, took over leadership; however, Fields maintained his control of The Thunderbolt. Without its two central figures, the NSRP fell apart, and by 1987, it had ceased to exist.

== Similar groups ==
The group had no specific connection to the earlier States' Rights Democratic Party, although it did share some of its views. Similarly, the party had no direct connection to the group of the same name set up in June 2005 in Philadelphia, Mississippi, after the conviction of Edgar Ray Killen for his role in three 1964 murders, although this group consciously picked the name to evoke Stoner's defunct movement.

== See also ==
- American Independent Party
  - George Wallace 1968 presidential campaign
