= Secret Army Organization =

Defunct American right-wing paramilitary group

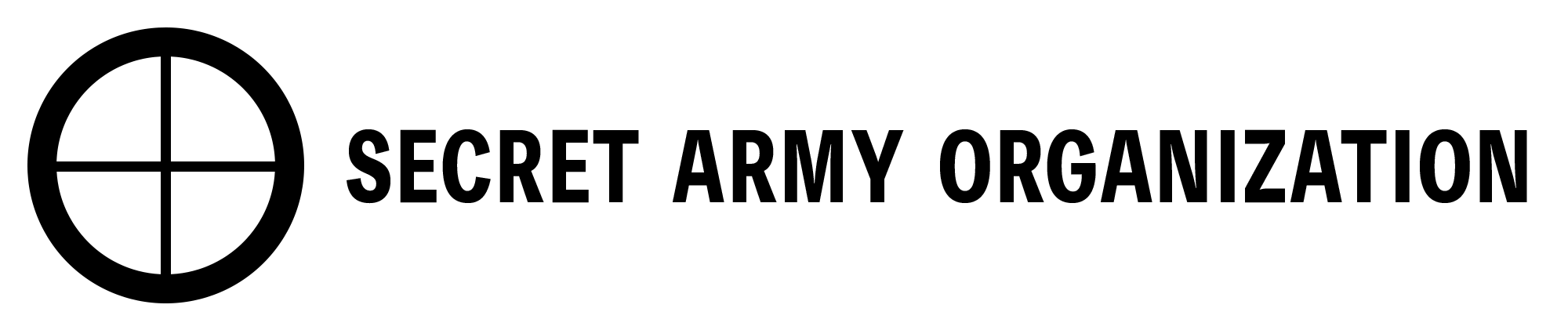
- Abbreviation: SAO
- Predecessor: Minutemen
- Type: Paramilitary
- Legal status: Dissolved
- Headquarters: San Diego, California, U.S.
- Region served: Southern California
- Members: 12–30
- Key people: Jerry Lynn Davis, Howard G. Godfrey, John Rasperry

The Secret Army Organization (SAO) was a short-lived right-wing paramilitary organization in Southern California, set up in 1971 in the aftermath of the breakup of the Minutemen group by local law enforcement. The ACLU has claimed that the organization had FBI support.

== History ==
The Secret Army Organization was headquartered in San Diego, California and consisted of around twelve local members with a handful more spread across Southern California. Its creation was the product of a meeting held on October 16–17, 1971; its leaders, Howard B. Godfrey and Jerry Lynn Davis, had been members of the Minutemen, a right-wing extremist organization.

In 1971 and 1972, the Secret Army Organization engaged in a variety of criminal and provocative behavior. They fire-bombed cars, burglarized the homes of antiwar protestors, and ransacked places of work.

=== ACLU report ===
On June 26, 1975, the American Civil Liberty Union of Southern California filed a report with Senate investigators alleging that the FBI was instrumental in the creation and operation of the SAO. The filing of this report came two days after the FBI publicly acknowledged its involvement in the illegal domestic counterintelligence program COINTELPRO, with activity spanning from May 1968 until April 1971.

=== Allegations of government support ===
The ACLU has claimed a connection between the SAO and the FBI, but this has not been substantiated.

In April 1972, the FBI initiated a new operation, this time recruiting a member of the San Diego Police Department's antisubversive Red Squad unit, Gil Romero, because he had experience as an FBI informant, and J.M. Lopez, an undercover San Diego police officer. According to the ACLU report, Lincoln Bueno, a member of the left-wing Chicano organization Brown Berets, and Bohmer were to be lured over the border to a remote location in Tijuana, Mexico, where they would be murdered by Mexican Federal police over a contrived cache of smuggled firearms. ACLU lawyer H. Peter Young reported that this conspiracy was abandoned when the Republican convention was moved to Miami Beach, Florida.

=== Allegations of White House support ===
The White House was alleged to have maintained its own liaison to the SAO, Donald Segretti. Segretti was quoted by the ACLU as having told the SAO that anyone causing trouble at the 1972 Republican convention would be "gotten rid of," apparently in reference to the so-called "Liddy plan" as described in the United States Senate Watergate Committee. The plan was named for G. Gordon Liddy, former counsel of the Committee for the Re-election of the President and entailed the kidnapping of protestors and sending them to Mexico.

== Dissolution ==
The ACLU claims that the FBI prevented prosecutors from pursuing Godfrey for his activity with the SAO. Having been a firefighter before his work with the FBI, by 1975 he was employed by the California State Fire Marshal's Office.
