= Minutemen (anti-communist organization) =

Nativist organization formed in the United States

The Minutemen
- Founder: 1961
- Leader: Robert DePugh
- Country: United States
- Ideology: Anti-communism; Nativism
- Political position: Far-right

The Minutemen were an American anti-communist, nativist militia organization formed in the United States in the early 1960s. The founder and head of the group was Robert DePugh, a biochemist from Norborne, Missouri. The Minutemen organized themselves into small cells and stockpiled weapons for an anticipated counter-revolution. It had an estimated 12,000 members in 1961.

DePugh published a 10-page pamphlet on guerrilla warfare via the Minutemen in 1961. The Minutemen's newsletter was called On Target. He was a founder of the Patriotic Party in 1966. FBI agent Guy Banister was involved with the organization.

In 1966, DePugh was arrested on federal weapons charges, which were later dismissed. Their offices were bombed in 1967, and DePugh resigned from the organization in 1967. In February 1968, he was indicted by a federal grand jury in Seattle, for conspiracy to commit bank robbery. Also in 1968, he was arrested for violation of federal firearms laws. He skipped bail and went underground for over a year until he was caught in 1969 in Truth or Consequences, New Mexico. He was convicted in 1970 and released from prison in May 1973. DePugh later wrote an anti-communist quasi-survivalist manual, Can You Survive? and was associated briefly with Liberty Lobby.

In the dissolution of the Minutemen, some of its members created the Secret Army Organization.

== Publications ==
The Minutemen's publication was a newsletter called On Target.

- Principles of Guerrilla Warfare, Robert DePugh. Published by the Minutemen, San Diego, CA, 1961. 10 pages.
- Blueprint for Victory, Robert DePugh. 1966.
- Can You Survive? Robert DePugh. Published by Desert Publications, El Dorado, AZ, 1973. 214 pages. ISBN 0-87947-442-4
