= J. B. Stoner =

American white supremacist (1924–2005)

J.B. Stoner
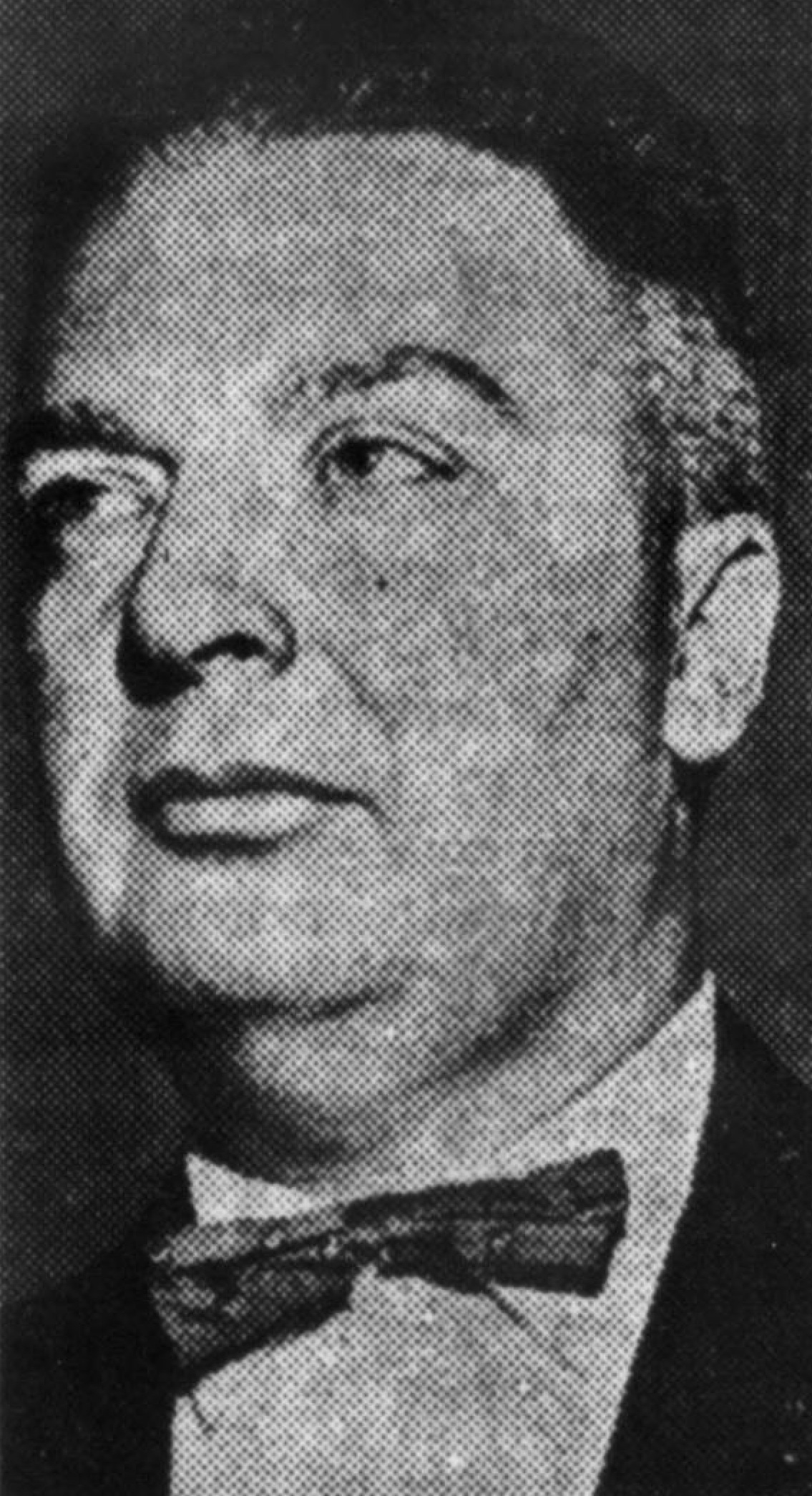
- Stoner in 1965

National chairman of the National States' Rights Party
- In office 1958–1980
- Preceded by: Office established
- Succeeded by: Leadership collapse

Personal details
- Born: Jesse Benjamin Stoner Jr. April 13, 1924 La Fayette, Georgia, U.S.
- Died: April 23, 2005 (aged 81) La Fayette, Georgia, U.S.
- Party: Democratic
- Other political affiliations: National States' Rights Party
- Parents: Jesse Benjamin Stoner Sr. (father); Minnie Stoner (mother)
- Occupation: Lawyer
- Criminal information
- Status: Deceased
- Motive: White supremacy
- Conviction: Conspiracy to commit a bombing
- Penalty: 10 years in prison (paroled after 3 1/2 years)

Details
- Date: June 29, 1958
- Location: Bethel Baptist Church
- Date apprehended: September 29, 1977

Jesse Benjamin Stoner Jr. (April 13, 1924 – April 23, 2005) was an American lawyer, White supremacist, segregationist, and perennial candidate. He perpetrated the 1958 bombing of the Bethel Baptist Church in Birmingham, Alabama; he was not convicted for the bombing of the church until 1980.

He was a co-founder and the long-time chairman of the National States' Rights Party; he published its newsletter, The Thunderbolt. Stoner campaigned for several political offices as a Southern Democrat in order to promote his white supremacist agenda.

== Early life ==
Jesse Benjamin Stoner Jr was born in LaFayette, Georgia. His family ran a sight-seeing company on Lookout Mountain, as well as in nearby Chattanooga. At age two, he contracted childhood polio, which impaired one of his legs and resulted in a lifelong limp. His father Jesse Benjamin Stoner Sr., died when he was five; his mother Minnie died when he was 17.

== Career ==
Stoner admired segregationist politician Theodore G. Bilbo. He became active in white supremacist groups and traveled to Washington, D.C. to support Bilbo. When Stoner was 17, he became a courier for the America First Committee.

Stoner rechartered a chapter of the Ku Klux Klan in Chattanooga in 1942, when he was 18 years old. Stoner once said that "being a Jew [should] be a crime punishable by death." He ran the National States' Rights Party, founded by Ed Fields, an associate of Stoner's.

Stoner received a law degree from Atlanta Law School in 1952. He served as the attorney for James Earl Ray, the assassin of Martin Luther King Jr. The Federal Bureau of Investigation (FBI) suspected that Stoner was also involved in the assassination of Martin Luther King Jr., as well as bombings of several synagogues and black churches during the 1950s and 1960s, such as the 16th Street Baptist Church bombing in Birmingham, Alabama.

He lived at 591 Cherokee Street in "Old" Marietta, Georgia.

As a "roving white supremacist", Stoner, along with Connie Lynch, was present in Bogalusa, Louisiana in 1965. He performed the same road show to inflame white mobs as he had done in St. Augustine, Florida during the summer of 1964.

Stoner ran for governor of Georgia in 1970. During the campaign, in which he called himself the "candidate of love", he described Adolf Hitler as "too moderate"; described black people as an extension of the ape family; and said that Jews are "vipers of Hell." The primary was won by Jimmy Carter, a civil rights movement supporter, and future president. Stoner got 17,663 votes, or 2.21%.

Stoner ran for the United States Senate in 1972, finishing fifth in the Democratic Party primary with just over 40,000 votes. The nomination and the election were both won by Sam Nunn.

During Stoner's Senate campaign, the Federal Communications Commission (FCC) ruled that television stations had to play his offensive, racist ads because of the equal-time rule.

Stoner continued his losing campaigns, running for lieutenant governor in 1974. In 1978, Stoner ran in the Democratic gubernatorial primary and polled 37,654 votes (5.4%). He ran again for a seat in the US Senate in 1980. Stoner got 19,664 votes or 1.91%. His best showing was 73,000 votes (10%) in his campaign for lieutenant governor in 1974, when he sought to succeed Lester G. Maddox in Georgia's second-highest constitutional office. That year, Maddox lost the gubernatorial nomination to former legislator George D. Busbee.

== Bethel Baptist Church bombing ==
Stoner was a suspect in the 1958 bombing of the Bethel Baptist Church, but he was not indicted for it until 1977. In 1980, a mostly white jury found him guilty and sentenced him to ten years in prison.

Prosecutors suspected that Stoner perpetrated as many as a dozen other bombings attributed to the "Confederate Underground"; these included the attempted bombing of Temple Beth-El in Charlotte, North Carolina (1957); and the bombings or attempted bombing of Temple Emanuel in Gastonia, North Carolina (1958), the Nashville, Tennessee Jewish Community Center (1958), Temple Beth El in Miami, Florida (1958), the Jacksonville Jewish Center and a black elementary school (1958), Temple Beth-El in Birmingham, Alabama (1958), and The Temple in Atlanta (1958), and Congregation Anshai Emeth in Peoria, Illinois (1958). He was not prosecuted for any of those cases.

After being convicted for the Birmingham bombing, Stoner appealed his conviction for three years. When his appeals ran out, he lived in hiding as a fugitive for four months. In 1984, he was permanently removed from the roster of lawyers who may appear before the United States Supreme Court.

Stoner was released from prison for good behavior in 1986, having served 3 1/2 years of his 10-year sentence.

== Later life ==
After his release from prison and until his death at the age of 81, Stoner lived at a nursing home in northwest Georgia, still defending his segregationist views. In one of his last interviews he stated, "A person isn't supposed to apologize for being right." His left side was partially paralyzed as the result of a stroke. Stoner is buried at Forest Hills Cemetery in Chattanooga, Tennessee.

== Works ==
=== Published works ===
- Stoner, J.B. (1946). The gospel of Jesus Christ versus the Jews : Christianity's attitude toward the Jews as explained from the Holy Bible. Chattanooga, Tenn: Stoner Anti-Jewish Party. p. 58. OCLC 17628735.
- Stoner, J.B. (1974). Christ not a Jew and Jews not God's chosen people. Marietta, Ga.: Thunderbolt. p. 11. OCLC 1674734.

=== Letters ===
Ephemeral materials, 198—by J B Stoner; Crusade Against Corruption. Wilcox Collection of Contemporary Political Movements, University of Kansas.

=== Audiovisual recordings ===
- J.B. Stoner. J.B. Stoner : commercials, 1972–1990. Norman, Oklahoma: Julian P. Kanter Political Commercial Archive at the University of Oklahoma. Archived from the original on February 17, 2007.
- Stoner, J.B. (1964). J.B. Stoner, National States Rights Party (Speech). Chicago, Illinois.
- Stoner, J.B. & Erwin Saul. Interview with Sarah Kessler. J.B. Stoner and Erwin Saul comment on recent violence by the National States' Rights Party and similar organizations. Date unknown. OCLC 18387322.
