= Young: Nordic Journal of Youth Research =

Young
- Discipline: Sociology, Youth Studies and Psychology
- Language: English
- Edited by: Katrine Fangen

Publication details
- History: February 2007
- Publisher: SAGE Publications (India)
- Frequency: Quarterly

Standard abbreviations
- ISO 4: Young

Indexing
- ISSN: 1103-3088 (print); 1741-3222 (web)

Links
- Journal homepage; Online access; Online archive

The Young is a peer-reviewed academic journal that publishes research on the life situation of young people.

The journal is published four times a year by SAGE Publications, India with an aim to bring young people's experiences to the centre of analysis with a view to strengthening youth research.

This journal is a member of the Committee on Publication Ethics (COPE).

== Abstracting and indexing ==
Young is abstracted and indexed in:

- ProQuest: International Bibliography of the Social Sciences (IBSS)
- Social Sciences Citation Index (Web of Science)
- SCOPUS
- DeepDyve
- Portico
- Dutch-KB
- Pro-Quest-RSP
- EBSCO
- Sociological Abstracts - ProQuest
- J-Gate
