= Jeffrey Kaplan (historian) =

American academic (1954–2025)

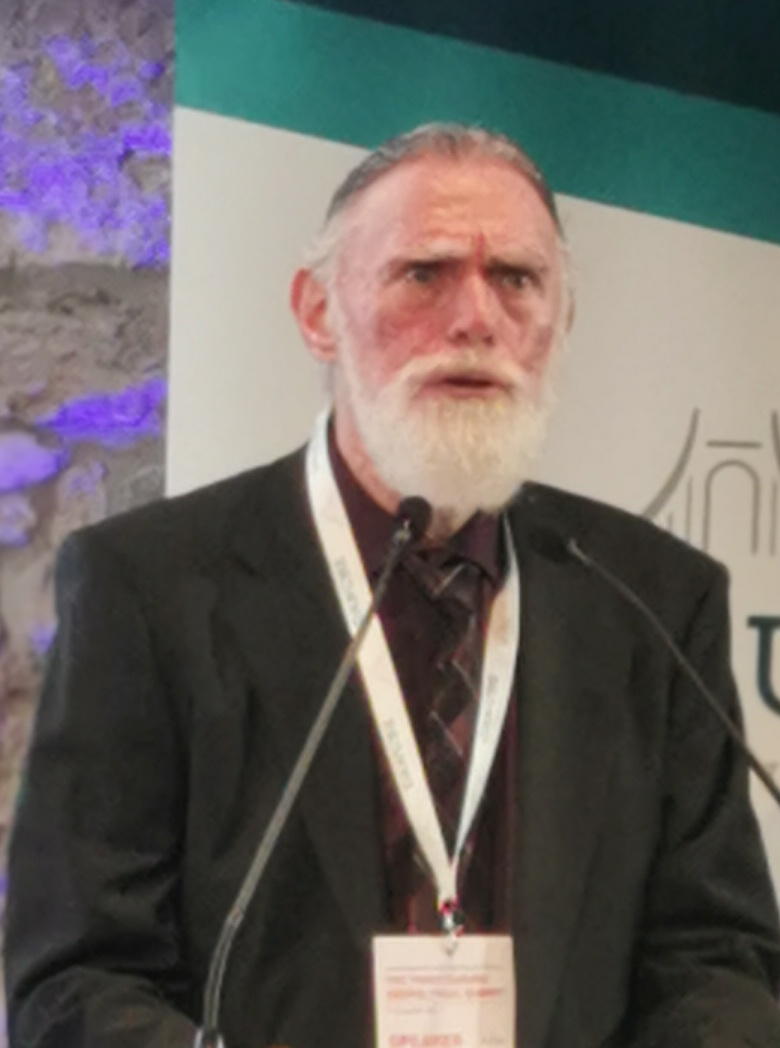
- Kaplan in 2023
- Born: March 23, 1954; Denver, Colorado, U.S.
- Died: March 12, 2025 (aged 70); Charlotte, North Carolina, U.S.
- Occupations: Professor, author
- Known for: Research on extremism

Academic background
- Education: Colorado State University (M.A., 1981); Tufts University (M.A., 1989); University of Chicago (Ph.D., 1993)

Academic work
- Institutions: University of Wisconsin–Oshkosh

Jeffrey Kaplan (March 23, 1954 – March 12, 2025) was an American academic who wrote and edited a number of books on racism, religious violence, terrorism and the far-right. He was an associate professor of religion at the University of Wisconsin–Oshkosh and sat on the editorial boards of the journals Terrorism and Political Violence, Nova Religio and The Pomegranate. Kaplan authored and edited several books in his career, including Radical Religion in America, Nation and Race, and the Encyclopedia of White Power.

== Early life and education ==
Kaplan was born March 23, 1954, in Denver, Colorado, to parents Arthur and Shyrle Gladstone Kaplan. He had one younger brother.

He earned an M.A. in Linguistics from Colorado State University in 1981, an M.A. in international relations from The Fletcher School of Law and Diplomacy (Tufts University) in 1989, and earned a Ph.D. in the history of culture from the University of Chicago in 1993. His PhD thesis was titled "Revolutionary Millenarianism in the Modern World: From Christian Identity to Gush Emunim".

== Career ==
In the mid-to-late 1990s, Kaplan was an assistant professor of history at Arctic Sivunmun Ilisagvik College in Utqiagvik, Alaska. Kaplan was awarded a Guggenheim Foundation Research Grant for a project on "The Emergence of a Violent Euro-American Radical Right" with Leonard Weinberg.

Kaplan occupied the Bicentennial Fulbright Chair in American Studies at the University of Helsinki in Finland from 1998 to 1999. He was an associate professor of religion at the University of Wisconsin–Oshkosh and a member of the board of academic advisors of the university's Institute for the Study of Religion, Violence and Memory. As of 2019, he was a professor of security studies at the King Fahd Security College in Saudi Arabia.

Kaplan formerly sat on the editorial boards of the journals Terrorism and Political Violence, Nova Religio and The Pomegranate.

== Works ==
Kaplan authored several books during his career. His first authored book, Radical Religion in America, was published in 1997 by Syracuse University Press. In 1998, he co-authored a volume on similar subjects with Leonard Weinberg, The Emergence of a Euro-American Radical Right. In 2000, his Encyclopedia of White Power was published by AltaMira Press.

In 2010, he wrote Terrorist Groups and the New Tribalism: Terrorism's Fifth Wave, where he argues that at the time society was experiencing the "Fifth Wave" of terrorism. In 2015, his book Radical Religion and Violence: Theory and Case Studies was published by Routledge, which surveys the connection between extreme religious beliefs and violence. Apocalypse, Revolution, and Terrorism was published in 2019. He also edited several books. He co-edited Nation and Race with Tore Bjørgo in 1998, on the Euro-American racist movement, and edited The Cultic Milieu with Heléne Lööw in 2002.

== Personal life and death ==
Kaplan was married and had one stepson. He died on March 12, 2025, in Charlotte, North Carolina, from complications of leukemia. He was aged 70.

== Publications ==
- —— (June 1993). Revolutionary Millenarianism in the Modern World: From Christian Identity to Gush Emunim (PhD thesis). University of Chicago. OCLC 29286137.
- —— (1997). Radical Religion in America: Millenarian Movements from the Far Right to the Children of Noah. Syracuse University Press. ISBN 0-8156-0396-7.
- ——; Bjørgo, Tore, eds. (1998). Nation and Race: The Developing Euro-American Racist Subculture. Boston: Northeastern University Press. ISBN 1-55553-332-9.
- ——; Weinberg, Leonard (1998). The Emergence of a Euro-American Radical Right. New Brunswick: Rutgers University Press. ISBN 0-8135-2563-2.
- ——, ed. (2000). Encyclopedia of White Power: A Sourcebook on the Radical Racist Right. Walnut Creek: AltaMira Press. ISBN 0-7425-0340-2.
- —— (2000). Beyond the Mainstream: The Emergence of Religious Pluralism in Finland, Estonia, and Russia. Helsinki: SKS. ISBN 95-1746-180-1.
- ——; Lööw, Heléne, eds. (2002). The Cultic Milieu: Oppositional Subcultures in an Age of Globalization. Walnut Creek: AltaMira Press. ISBN 0-7591-0203-1.
- ——, ed. (2002). Millennial Violence: Past, Present and Future. London; Portland: Frank Cass. ISBN 0-7146-5294-6.
- Taylor, Bron; ——, eds. (2005). The Encyclopedia of Religion and Nature. London; New York: Thoemmes Continuum. ISBN 1-84371-138-9.
- —— (2010). Terrorist Groups and the New Tribalism: Terrorism's Fifth Wave. Abingdon; New York: Routledge. ISBN 978-0-415-45338-7.
- —— (2015). Radical Religion and Violence: Theory and Case Studies. New York: Routledge. ISBN 978-0-415-81414-0.
- ——; Lööw, Heléne; Malkki, Leena, eds. (2015). Lone Wolf and Autonomous Cell Terrorism. New York: Routledge. ISBN 978-1-138-85122-1.
- —— (2019). Apocalypse, Revolution and Terrorism: From the Sicari to the American Revolt against the Modern World. New York: Routledge. ISBN 978-1-138-48365-1.
- Shaffer, Ryan; ——, eds. (2020). The Legacy of 9/11: Transformations of Policing, Intelligence, and Counter-Terrorism. New York: Routledge. ISBN 978-1-03-263710-5.
- —— (2021). A Deep Dive into the Meaning and Impact of January 6 Capitol Insurrection. Abu Dhabi: TRENDS Research and Advisory. ISBN 978-9948-84608-6.
- —— (2022). From Leaderless Resistance to Streaming Video Strikes: The Evolution of Lone Wolf Terrorism. Abu Dhabi: TRENDS Research and Advisory. ISBN 978-9948-04393-5.
- ——, ed. (2022). Anti-Semitism in Hungary: Appearance and Reality, Volume 1. Reno: Helena History Press. ISBN 978-1-943596-27-0.
- ——, ed. (2023). Anti-Semitism in Hungary: Appearance and Reality, Volume 2. Reno: Helena History Press. ISBN 978-1-943596-29-4.
- —— (2025). The Early Israeli Settler Movement: The Birth Pangs of Gush Emunim. New York: Routledge. ISBN 978-1-04-011371-4.
