= National Socialist Vanguard =

Neo-Nazi group based in the Western United States

- The logo of the National Socialist Vanguard, as it appears of the masthead of their newsletter
- Formation: 1983
- Founder: Rick Cooper
- Type: Neo-Nazi
- Location: United States

The National Socialist Vanguard was a Neo-Nazi group founded in 1983 and led by Rick Cooper, based in The Dalles, Oregon, US, from about 1998. It focused its efforts on recruiting high school students.

== History ==
Rick Cooper (1946–2006) began his National Socialist activism in 1970 when he set up a "White Power" telephone message service in Fresno, California. He joined the National Socialist White People's Party in 1975 and became its business manager at its Arlington, Virginia, Virginia headquarters on August 12, 1978. He remained business manager until February 5, 1980, when he was transferred to Chicago. Cooper began to have friction with Party leader Matt Koehl, particularly over the issuing of National Socialist "victory bonds", which would be redeemed after the Party took power. Cooper filed a lawsuit to recover his investments and suspended from membership.

In a June 1980 letter, NSWPP membership secretary Dominic Lewitzke sent a letter to Cooper outlining the charges against him. The letter accused Cooper of coprolagnia; personal habits which embarrassed the Movement, such as rummaging through trash bins in broad daylight and talking about his coprolagnia to Party members and business associates; and a lack of proper understanding of the National Socialist worldview and objectives. Cooper responded with an eleven-page missive refuting each charge and outlining his decade of National Socialist activism. Within twenty four hours of receiving the letter Lewitzke committed suicide.

Cooper broke with the Koehl in 1982 and founded the NSV on January 1, 1983, in Salinas, California with two other ex-NSWPP members, Dan Stewart and Fred Surber. Attempting to avoid the problems which had beset other National Socialist groups, the NSV was formed as an unincorporated association without formal membership, dues, book list or literature, other than its quarterly newsletter NSV Report. The organization moved to Goldendale, Washington in the fall of 1985 and has been based in the Dalles, Oregon since at least October 1998.

For a while the NSV had a business arm known as ST Enterprises, which would finance the NSV and provide jobs for activists. Businesses associated with the NSV included Nordic Carpet and Upholstery Cleaning, Hessian Janitorial Service, Quartermaster Laundry and Galactic Storm Troop Amusement Center, all located in Salinas. They intended to create a white separatist enclave called Wolf Stadt. However ST Enterprises folded in 1986.

By 2000 the NSV was advocating a survivalist program urging whites to move to rural areas, stock up on food, water, legal firearms and other supplies and network with other activists in anticipation a coming race war. Other than that they recommended that whites join the "legal, organization and political" vehicles of their choice. The NSV was financed by "basically by the activists themselves" and the NSV Report was financed by subscription rates and freewill donations. NSV Report differed from other White Nationalist publications in that it did not publish propaganda for "the masses", but rather was geared to activists, leaders and those who were already in the Movement, and reports on the Movements activities overall, and particularly in the Pacific Northwest, along with some "philosophical articles".

== See also ==
- Neo-Nazi groups of the United States
