= York Daily Record =

Newspaper in York, Pennsylvania, US

The York Daily Record
- Type: Daily newspaper
- Format: Broadsheet
- Owner: USA Today Co.
- Editor: Randy Parker
- Founded: 1796
- Headquarters: York, Pennsylvania
- Circulation: 37,323 daily; 61,665 on Sundays
- Sister newspapers: The York Dispatch
- Website: ydr.com

The York Daily Record is a newspaper and news publisher serving York, Pennsylvania, United States, and the surrounding region. Its news publications are the York Daily Record and York Sunday News. At the end of 2014, the newspaper's circulation was 37,323 daily and 61,665 on Sundays.

The newspaper, printed in a broadsheet format, is published seven days a week. It also publishes "FlipSide," a nightlife and entertainment guide that is distributed every Thursday. The York Daily Record/Sunday News is available online in an e-Edition, with Saturday editions exclusively in that format since March 2022. The media organization runs the YDR.com website and also has smartphone and tablet apps.

Some of its key coverage areas include Watchdog, Food, College Football and high school sports coverage of the YAIAA league. The media organization also operates a community blog portal.

The Daily Record and The York Dispatch have worked under a joint operating agreement since 1990. The newspapers are to return to more independent operations after the agreement expires in June 2024.

Gannett announced June 1, 2015, that it had acquired the Daily Record.

== History ==
In 1796, Solomon Meyer created Die York Gazette, a weekly, German-language newspaper, which The York Daily Record credits as its earliest incarnation.

After several years without publication of Die York Gazette, William C. Harris created the English-language Gazette in 1815. Between 1821 and 1891, The Gazette also published a weekly German edition.

The Gazette was taken over by David Small in 1836. Small, who also served as York postmaster, county director of the poor and York's chief burgess, remained owner of the paper for nearly 50 years.

Prominent businessman Adam Geesey converted The Gazette into a daily publication in 1887. The Gazette became the third York-area newspaper to publish daily.

In 1915, Allen C. Wiest and law partner J.W. Gitt acquired the foundering Gazette, which began Gitt's 55-year reign as Gazette owner. Under Gitt, the newspaper gained a national reputation for its independent—some considered it leftist—news orientation and editorial positions.

The Gazette purchased The Daily, York's first daily newspaper, and the York Legal Record in 1915. In 1918, The Gazette was renamed The Gazette and Daily.

After nearly 150 years of continuous publication, the paper shut down in 1970 because of labor problems. Gitt sold the paper's assets to a local group headed by attorney Harold N. Fitzkee Jr. and retired The Gazette and Daily name. The paper soon reopened under a York Daily Record nameplate.

In 1973, The Daily Record was sold to Jimmy D. Scoggins, a veteran newspaperman, who changed the paper's format from tabloid to its current broadsheet form. The Gazette and Daily had become a tab in 1943 because of newsprint shortages during World War II.

Buckner News Alliance purchased the newspaper from Scoggins in 1978 and modernized the paper's appearance and operations.

MediaNews Group, owner of The York Dispatch, purchased the York Sunday News in 1988. The next year, The Daily Record and The York Dispatch sought government approval for a Joint Operating Agreement (JOA), a partial merger because "The Daily Record" was facing financial troubles. The U.S. Justice Department approved the JOA in 1990, creating the York Newspaper Co. to manage merged production, circulation and advertising departments. The Daily Record and Dispatch newsrooms were not part of the merger and to this day remain under separate ownership.

In 2004, Buckner News Alliance sold the York Daily Record to MediaNews Group, which also owned the York Sunday News the news organization operated as the York Daily Record/Sunday News.

In September 2011, MediaNews Group, parent company of the Daily Record, announced it had appointed John Paton as CEO, and entered into an agreement with Digital First Media. Paton heads Digital First Media which provides management services to MediaNews Group and Journal Register Company publications.

On June 1, 2015, Gannett Co., the largest U.S. newspaper publisher by total daily circulation, said it had acquired the Daily Record along with several other newspapers from Digital First Media.

== Awards ==
The following are some of the awards and recognitions received by the newsroom of the York Daily Record/Sunday News and its affiliated digital products in the past 20 years:

=== Pennsylvania Newspaper Association awards ===
- Pennsylvania's Newspaper of the Year Award 2001 (tied for second place), 2003 (second place), 2004 (first place), 2011 (first place), 2016 (first place), 2017 (second place), 2018 (tied for first place)
- PNA Foundation Public Service Award: 2002–2005, 2007 and 2009–2011, 2015–16, 2018.
- Pennsylvania Newspaper Association's G. Richard Dew Award for Journalistic Service (PNA's highest honor): won nine times between 1991 and 2018.
- Pennsylvania Newspaper Association's Readership Initiative Award recognizes Pennsylvania newspapers that accept and create a community of readers through innovative initiatives: Won or placed second 11 times since 2006.
- Sweepstakes Award from the Pennsylvania Society of Newspaper Editors (for the most points in a circulation division in the annual Keystone Press Awards): Won or tied 19 times since 1990.

=== Other awards ===
- American Society of Newspaper Editors: 2011, finalist in the competition for online storytelling. Jason Plotkin's "Carrying Darisabel: A documentary film".
- The Mid-Atlantic Emmy Award for Jason Plotkin's "Carrying Darisabel" project, 2011. This Emmy is the first Mid-Atlantic Emmy for a newspaper-based organization competing directly against TV news organizations.
- The Editor & Publisher’s EPPY Award in the category of Best Enterprise/Investigative Video, honoring the Best Media-Affiliated Websites (competed in division for sites with 250,000 to 1 million unique monthly visitors) for Jason Plotkin’s documentary, “Carrying Darisabel”.
- Newspaper Excellence in Cyberspace Awards:
  - Best Application of Social Networking 2011 (second place).
  - Best Online Campaign 2011 (first place)
- John V.R. Bull Freedom of Information Award (Pennsylvania Society of Newspaper Editors): 2002, 2003, 2005, 2008 and 2012–2014.
- Best of Show (Newswriting) and Public Service awards, Pennsylvania Associated Press Managing Editors: 2002 (for York Riots)
- Scripps Howard Foundation National Journalism Award: Public Service Report, 2001 (tie).
- Pennsylvania Newspaper Foundation John Fisher Internet Vision Award, 2010, James McClure recipient.
- Thurgood Marshall Journalism Award for coverage of Ray Krone's release from death row: 2003.
- Investigative Reporters and Editors Award: 2009, finalist in the under 100,000 circulation category for reporting on Finances of Nonprofit Angel Food Ministries – Melissa Nann Burke. Burke was also a finalist in Livingston Awards for Young Journalists competition, 2011. Burke also won the Religion News Association Cassels award in 2010 and 2011.
- National Society of Newspaper Columnist competition, under 100,000 circulation category, Finalist: Mike Argento, 2011.

== Niche publications ==
=== GameTimePA ===
GameTimePA was a brand of high school sports coverage in southcentral Pennsylvania, including Adams, Franklin, Fulton, Lebanon and York counties.

The brand at one point expanded into the Philadelphia-area, including parts of Bucks, Chester, Delaware and Montgomery counties.

GameTimePA spanned more than 60 schools and 22 sanctioned sports in the PIAA. GameTimePA offers live coverage of high school events, including livestreams of football and other sports, live updates and scoring/game updates on GameTimePA's Twitter and Facebook accounts.

Editorial coverage was provided by the York Daily Record/Sunday News, Hanover Evening Sun, Lebanon Daily News and Chambersburg Public Opinion.

== Community outreach/engagement ==
=== The NewsVroom ===
The York Daily Record's parent company, Digital First Media, in 2012 awarded the newsroom a grant to build the NewsVroom—a mobile, community media lab. The new-media classroom on wheels was equipped with smartphones, tablets, laptops and Wi-Fi. The vehicle and YDR journalists have been to breaking news scenes, political events, high school football games, the York Fair, the York County Libraries and more to interact face-to-face with readers and glean information to better serve York and its surrounding areas.

The purpose of the NewsVroom was to boost the public's understanding of how the news organization and readers can use new technology to share and consume news and information.

The NewsVroom and the York Daily Record/Sunday News staff were recognized by Digital First Media as the company's best community engagement project of 2012.
