= Mundt–Nixon Bill =

1948 proposed US law on Communist registration

Subversive Activities Control Act, 1948
- Long title: An Act protect the United States against un-American and subversive activities.
- Nicknames: Mundt–Nixon Bill
- Enacted by: the 80th United States Congress

Legislative history
- Introduced in the House as H.R. 5852 by Richard Nixon (R–CA) on May 14, 1948; Committee consideration by United States Senate Committee on the Judiciary; Passed the House on May 19, 1948 (319-58)

The Mundt–Nixon Bill, named after Karl Mundt and Richard Nixon, formally the Subversive Activities Control Act, was a proposed law in 1948 that would have required all members of the Communist Party of the United States register with the Attorney General.

== History ==
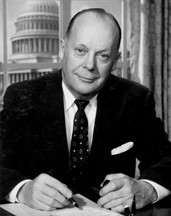
U.S. Representative Karl E. Mundt.

Hearings for this bill (as well as a tougher bill that would have outlawed the Communist Party) started in February 1948.

=== House bill passes ===
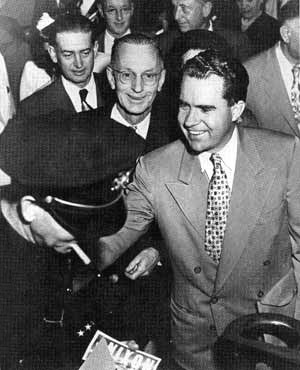
U.S. Representative Richard M. Nixon campaigns for Senate (1950)

The bill, also known as the "Subversive Activities Control Act [of] 1948", was first introduced on May 14, 1948, as H.Res. 582, at which time it was known as the Mundt–Nixon Bill. In his memoirs, Nixon described it as a bill to implement "a new approach to the complicated problem of internal communist subversion... It provided for registration of all Communist Party members and required a statement of the source of all printed and broadcast material issued by organizations that were found to be Communist fronts."

Nixon served as floor manager for the Republican Party; Vito Marcantonio served as floor manager for the Democratic Party. On May 19, 1948, the bill passed the House by 319 to 58. Forty-six Harvard University professors publicly opposed its passage. (The Nixon Library cites this bill's passage as Nixon's first significant victory in Congress.)

On May 23, 1948, The New York Times summed up the Mundt–Nixon Bill's future as follows. Supporters argued it would allow the Government to "control the communists" via registration and other methods to "drive the communists and their allies into the open". Opponents argued the unconstitutionality of many provisions against freedom of speech and freedom of the press, as well as a means to "crack down" on labor and progressive political groups.

=== Senate investigation ===
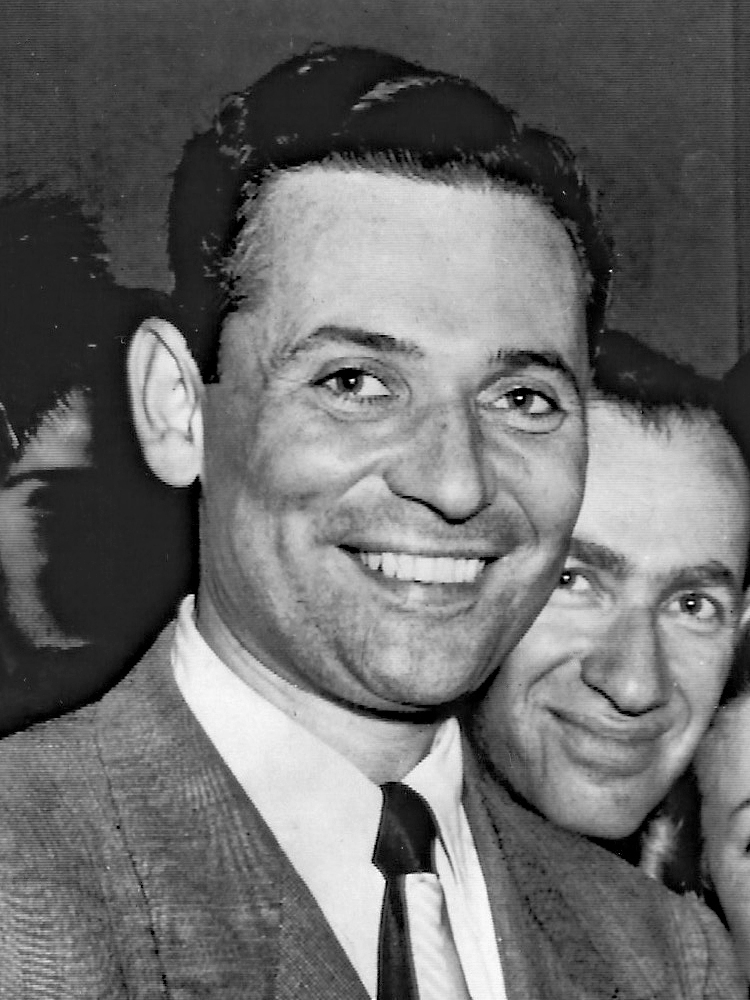
U.S. Representative Leo Isacson.

The Senate Judicial Committee held hearings May 27–30, 1948, for "the purpose of receiving testimony and opinions in relation to the constitutionality and practicality of H. R. 5852". The committee heard testimony from leftwing and rightwing political and union leaders, attorneys, who included: Father John Francis Cronin, William Z. Foster, John Gates, Rep. Leo Isacson, Kenneth Parkinson, Rep. J. Hardin Peterson, Donald Richberg, Paul Robeson, O. John Rogge, Norman Thomas, and former vice president Henry A. Wallace. The resulting report also included briefs, memoranda, letters, resolutions, and editorials from former US Solicitor General Charles Evans Hughes, Jr., John W. Davis, then-current US Attorney General Tom Clark, the ACLU, Louis Waldman, Morris Ernst, Lee Pressman, future Subversive Activities Control Board chairman Seth W. Richardson, Merwin K. Hart, the CPUSA, U.S. Senator Alexander Wiley, FBI director J. Edgar Hoover, John Thomas Taylor, the Milwaukee Journal, the Milwaukee Sentinel, the Atlanta Journal, the New York Herald Tribune, the New York Times, the Brooklyn Eagle, and U.S. Rep. Samuel Pettengill.

On May 27, 1948, Rep. Leo Isacson of the American Labor Party of New York (which was representing the Progressive Party in the state), told the committee that the bill would bring "disaster to the American people". He noted that Congress was rushing through the Mundt–Nixon Bill, yet holding up an anti-lynching bill. He declared his love of the "American form of government", which was the reason for his testimony.

On May 28, 1948, CPUSA national chairman William Z. Foster told the committee ("testified under oath") that American Communists would not support a war against the Soviet Union, because "Soviets don't make wars". He also said that they would not obey the Mundt–Nixon Bill, should it pass the Senate into law. Daily Worker editor John Gates concurred. Foster called the bill "a Fascist act of war preparation, just as Hitler's Nuremberg decrees and the Japanese ban on 'dangerous thoughts' were acts of preparation for World War II". The New York Times reprinted Foster's full testimony the following day.

On May 30, 1948, Henry A. Wallace, U.S. presidential candidate for the Progressive Party, told the committee he considered the Mundt–Nixon Bill an offensive act in the "cold war against Russia".

On May 30, 1948, Paul Robeson asked Congress not to pass this bill but rather to seek peace, while committee members pressed him to state whether he was a member of the Communist Party. The Senate recessed the hearings on May 30, 1948.

=== Public debate ===
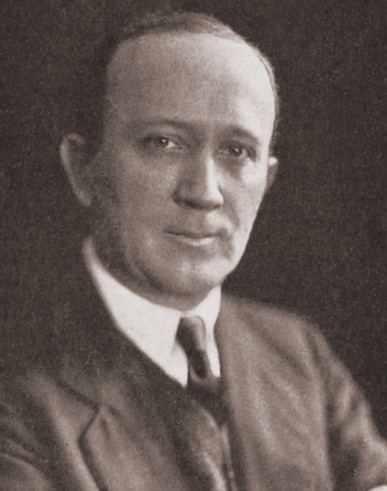
William Z. Foster, CPUSA head

On May 31, 1948, at 10:00 PM, Representative Mundt and Communist Party chairman Foster debated for an hour live on WJZ-ABC radio (now WABC (AM)). Foster was speaking from New York City; Mundt was speaking from Yankton, South Dakota (his home state). Foster stated that not only would the Mundt–Nixon Bill outlaw the Communist Party but also "knife organized labor, undermine American democracy, clear the way for a police state, and speed us into war". Mundt stated first that Communism was labor's "worst enemy" and that, rather than drive the Party underground, the bill would expose it so it could not "undermine the country by conspiracy".

On June 4, 1948, attorney Dana Converse Backus wrote to The New York Times a strongly worded letter "The Mundt-Nixon Bill: Suggestions Given for Revision of Proposed Legislation". With regard to American Communists, he stated, "a sense of proportion" is necessary so Americans might "realize that we are dealing more with a microbe than a menace". In his opinion, "the best weapon against a Communist is to know that he is one", while preserving civil liberties. The Mundt–Nixon Bill would outlaw communist parties in the U.S. and thus "encourage a multiplicity of Communist front organizations". "I suggest scrapping this whole attempt to register Communist front organization." Instead, he recommended that any organization which solicits funds should have to declare any officer or director or equivalent is a communist; if the organization has communists, then it should then have to declare so when soliciting funds, while it should also lose its tax exemption. Backus considered this proposal a temporary, "cautious experiment" for extraordinary times.

By June 5, 1948, The New York Times noted, the Mundt Bill's future was "clouded".

On June 6, 1948, ACLU lawyer Raymond L. Wise's letter to The New York Times appeared, asking for "careful study" of the provisions of the Mundt–Nixon Bill. Summarizing the bill's spirit and intent, he wrote:

It is contrary to our fundamental theories of government to penalize or put pressure on expression of opinion or on free association in advance of personal criminal guilt, established after trial by due process of law. No political groups are singled out for special criminal laws. We do not recognize 'guilt by association.'

As late as June 20, 1948, letters continued in The New York Times as the public debated the bill.

=== March on Washington ===
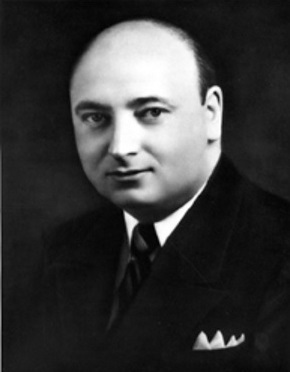
U.S. Representative Jerry J. O'Connell.

On May 31, protesters announced their plan to come by the "thousands" to Washington, DC, to demonstrate against the Mundt–Nixon Bill. First in the hearing room and then in front of the U.S. Senate Office Building, lead organizer Len Goldsmith stated, "By God, we are coming down by the thousands on Wednesday, and if they won't listen we will find other means." Goldman promised an "orderly" march of people, brought in by "trainloads and planeloads". Godman asked for the right of the public to be heard and insisted on "assurances" for open hearings. The New York Times noted that Goldman led the "Committee for Democratic Rights" and that he wore a blue campaign button for candidate Wallace.

By June 1, 1948, Wallace supporters visibly "took command" of the march on Washington. Former congressional representative Jerry J. O'Connell became chairman of a "National Committee to Defeat the Mundt Bill". The committee claimed that more than 5,000 would march on Washington on June 2.

On June 2, 1948, a "delegation of 200 New Yorkers" exploded into more than 3,000 people bound by train for Washington, DC, to protest the Mundt–Nixon Bill. Goldsmith led the effort to make train reservations, scheduled to leave New York's Penn Station as of 6:45 AM. He said his committee had also chartered DC-4 planes from California, Washington, Oregon, as well as trains from Chicago, Boston, and other cities. Goldman stated, "This is a protest by Americans of all political parties against denial of their right to be heard on proposed legislation of vital importance." Marchers were to converge on Turner's Arena in Washington, DC, and after lunch march on Capitol Hill to meet with politicians. They also planned to hold an open-air gathering, whose speakers would include: Representative Vito Marcantonio, Senator William Langer, Senator Glen Taylor (Wallace's vice presidential running mate), and Paul Robeson. Supporters included: O'Connell as chairman, the announcement went on, included: the "National Wallace Organization", the United Electrical Radio and Machine Workers, the International Longshoremen's and Warehousemen's Union, the Civil Rights Congress, and the New York Committee for Democratic Rights.

(Also on June 2, 1948, U.S. Immigration and FBI officials arrested a top Communist Party leader, Jack Stachel, in New York City on a warrant for deportation proceedings. On June 28, 1948, the Government would indict Stachel and ten other top Party leaders for violating the Smith Act and try them in 1949 in the Smith Act trials of Communist Party leaders.)

(Also on June 2, 1948, Mundt and Nixon won their respective primaries.)

On June 3, 1948, "thousand marched on Washington" to defeat the Mundt-Nixon Communist Control Bill. The New York Times described:

For an hour they threw a line of mass pickets, five and six abreast, across the entrance to the White House, although President Truman himself has long demanded passage of the civil rights measures. Other pickets took up stations briefly outside the headquarters of the Republican and Democratic National Committees.
The demonstrators moved upon Congress in many groups numbering hundreds each, seeking directly to influence the Senators from their states.
Finally, at a rally tonight on the green slopes below the Washington Monument, their speakers urged them to continue the "fire" of telegrams, delegations and protests toward Congress.

Former Representative O'Connell estimated that more than 5,000 people had protested. The Times reported "police were everywhere, although unobtrusively so." Meanwhile, "the Senate, the point to which the marchers were attempting to apply their maximum pressure, went through a typical, unhurried legislative day."

Later that night, John Howard Lawson and Howard Fast joined Paul Robeson spoke against the bill to crowd of 1,000 people in New York City gathered by Masses and Mainstream, a communist publication.

(Also on June 3, 1948, a House committee passed legislation to deport six alleged Communists.)

=== Senate bill fizzles ===
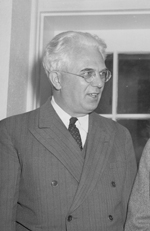
U.S. Senator Homer S. Ferguson.

As early as May 23, 1948, The New York Times was anticipating that "the Senate will duck the issue, at least for the remainder of this session."

By June 2, 1948, The New York Times reported that "the immediate effect of this [looming march on Washington] was a stiffening of attitude among some influential Senators, who previously had been prepared to concede that the measure, or any like it was as good as dead for this session of Congress." Further, it noted, "Some Republicans asserted that the supporters of Mr. Wallace, the Third party Presidential candidate, were seeking to present him before the country as having defeated a measure which already had had only the dimmest outlook for passage.

On June 3, 1948, Republicans senators Robert A. Taft and Homer S. Ferguson proposed a "Ferguson Amendment" to the Mundt-Nixon Communist Control Bill, which would "deny to the Attorney General any power even provisionally to label an organization as subversive and would require him to go to court directly to start any such proceeding". (In the House bill, the Attorney General could find a group subversive, subject to court appeal.) In effect, the amendment would make a court "sole and original judge of evidence".

On June 4, 1948, the Senate Judiciary Committee decided not to resume its hearings on the Mundt-Nixon Communist Control Bill.

By June 5, 1948, the Senate had locked into a "debate of surpassing bitterness and vehemence".

On June 6, 1948, Senator Alexander Wiley, chair of the Senate Judiciary Committee, announced that his committee continued to weigh the Mundt–Nixon Bill with "a fair and open mind".

Ultimately, the Senate did not act on the Mundt–Nixon Bill, and the bill fizzled.

== Opening text of HR 5828 ==
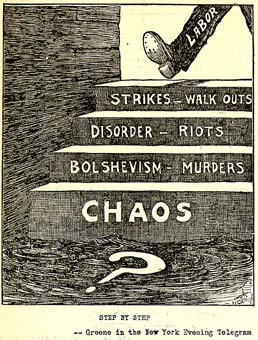
This 1919 political cartoon by Sidney Joseph Greene reflects American fears about Bolshevism and anarchism during the First Red Scare.

HR 5852 opens as follows, with the aim of combatting "a world communist movement" (with the words "communism" or "communist" bolded to facilitate eye scan):

[H. R. 5852, 80th Cong., 2d sess.]

AN ACT To protect the United States against un-American and subversive activities. Be it enacted by the Senate and House of Representatives of the United States of America in Congress assembled,

SHORT TITLE

Section 1. This Act may be cited as the "Subversive Activities Control Act, 1948".

NECESSITY FOR LEGISLATION

Sec. 2. As a result of evidence adduced before various committees of the Senate and House of Representatives, Congress hereby finds that—

1. The system of government known as totalitarian dictatorship is characterized by the existence of a single political party, organized on a dictatorial basis, and by an identity between such party and its policies and the government and governmental policies of the country in which it exists, such identity being so close that the party and the government itself are for all practical purposes indistinguishable.
2. The establishment of a totalitarian dictatorship in any country results in the ruthless suppression of all opposition to the party in power, the complete subordination of the rights of individuals to the state, the denial of fundamental rights and liberties which are characteristic of a representative form of government, such as freedom of speech, of the press, of assembly, and of religious worship, and results in the maintenance of control over the people through fear, terrorism, and brutality.
3. There exists a world **communist** movement which, in its origins, its development, and its present practice, is a world-wide revolutionary political movement whose purpose it is, by treachery, deceit, infiltration into other groups of governmental and otherwise), espionage, sabotage, terrorism, and any other means deemed necessary to establish a **communist** totalitarian dictatorship in all the countries of the world through the medium of a single world-wide **communist** political organization.
4. The direction and control of the world **communist** movement is vested in and exercised by the **communist** dictatorship of a foreign country.
5. The **communist** dictatorship of such foreign country, in exercising such direction and control and in furthering the purposes of the world **communist** movement, establishes or causes the establishment of, and utilizes, in various countries, political organizations which are acknowledged by such **communist** dictatorship as being constituent elements of the world **communist** movement; and such political organizations are not free and independent organizations, but are mere sections of a single world-wide **communist** organization and are controlled, directed, and subject to the discipline of the **communist** dictatorship of such foreign country.
6. The political organizations so established and utilized in various countries, acting under such control, direction, and discipline, endeavor to carry out the objectives of the world **communist** movement by bringing about the overthrow of existing governments and setting up **communist** totalitarian dictatorships which will be subservient to the most powerful existing **communist** totalitarian dictatorship.
7. In carrying on the activities referred to in paragraph (6), such political organizations in various countries are organized on a secret, conspiratorial basis and operate to a substantial extent through organizations, commonly known as "**communist** fronts", which in most instances are created and maintained, or used, in such manner as to conceal the facts as to their true character and purposes and their membership. One result of this method of operation is that such political organizations are able to obtain financial and other support from persons who would not extend such support if they knew the true purposes of, and the actual nature of the control and influence exerted upon, such "**communist** fronts."
8. Due to the nature and scope of the world **communist** movement, with the existence of affiliated constituent elements working toward common objectives in various countries of the world, travel of members, representatives, and agents from country to country is essential for purposes of communication and for the carrying on of activities to further the purposes of the movement.
9. In the United States those individuals who knowingly and willfully participate in the world **communist** movement, when they so participate, in effect repudiate their allegiance to the United States and in effect transfer their allegiance to the foreign country in which is vested the direction and control of the world **communist** movement; and, in countries other than the United States, those individuals who knowingly and willfully participate in such **communist** movement similarly repudiate their allegiance to the countries of which they are nationals in favor of such foreign **communist** country.
10. In pursuance of **communism**'s stated objectives, the most powerful existing **communist** dictatorship has, by the traditional **communist** methods referred to above, and in accordance with carefully conceived plans, already caused the establishment in numerous foreign countries, against the will of the people of those countries, of ruthless **communist** totalitarian dictatorships, and threatens to establish similar dictatorships in still other countries.
11. The recent successes of **communist** methods in other countries and the nature and control of the world **communist** movement itself present a clear and present danger to the security of the United States and to the existence of free American institutions and make it necessary that Congress enact appropriate legislation recognizing the existence of such world-wide conspiracy and designed to prevent it from accomplishing its purpose in the United States.

== Legacy ==
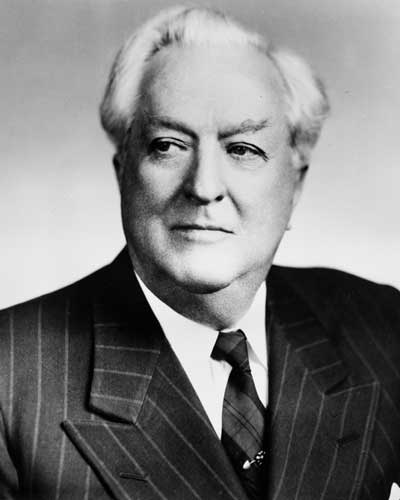
U.S. Senator Pat McCarran.

=== Mundt–Ferguson bill ===
The Mundt–Nixon Bill was re-introduced two years later as the Mundt–Ferguson bill (also known as the Subversive Activities Control Bill). Again it was passed by the House of Representatives but failed in the Senate.

=== McCarran Internal Security Act ===
Sen. Pat McCarran then took many of the provisions from the bill and included them in legislation he introduced that became the McCarran Internal Security Act, which passed both houses of Congress in 1950.

== See also ==
- McCarran Internal Security Act of 1950
- Mundt–Ferguson Communist Registration Bill (1950)
- National Committee to Defeat the Mundt Bill
- Smith Act (1940)
- Subversive Activities Control Board
