= National Committee to Defeat the Mundt Bill =

US anti-Red Scare legislation organization

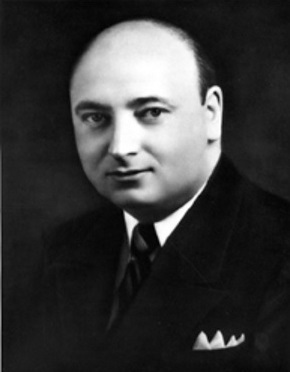
- Former US Representative Jerry J. O'Connell (here, 1951) headed NCDMB
- Formation: June 1, 1948; 78 years ago
- Founder: Jerry J. O'Connell
- Dissolved: September 22, 1950; 76 years ago
- Purpose: oppose Mundt-Nixon Bill
- National Chairman: Jerry J. O'Connell
- Treasurer: Bruce Waybur
- Executive Treasurer: Edith Pratt
- Registered Lobbyists: Jerry J. O'Connell, John B. Stone
- Subsidiaries: sub-committees in Chicago, Miami, New York, San Francisco, Santa Cruz, Delaware, Philadelphia, Trenton, Denver
- Affiliations: National Lawyers Guild, Communist Party USA

The National Committee to Defeat the Mundt Bill AKA "NCDMB" (1948-1950) was an American organization that sought to oppose passage of the Mundt-Nixon Bill and subject of a 15-page report of the House Un-American Activities Committee, two of whose members were US Representatives Karl E. Mundt and Richard M. Nixon.

== History ==
=== Background ===
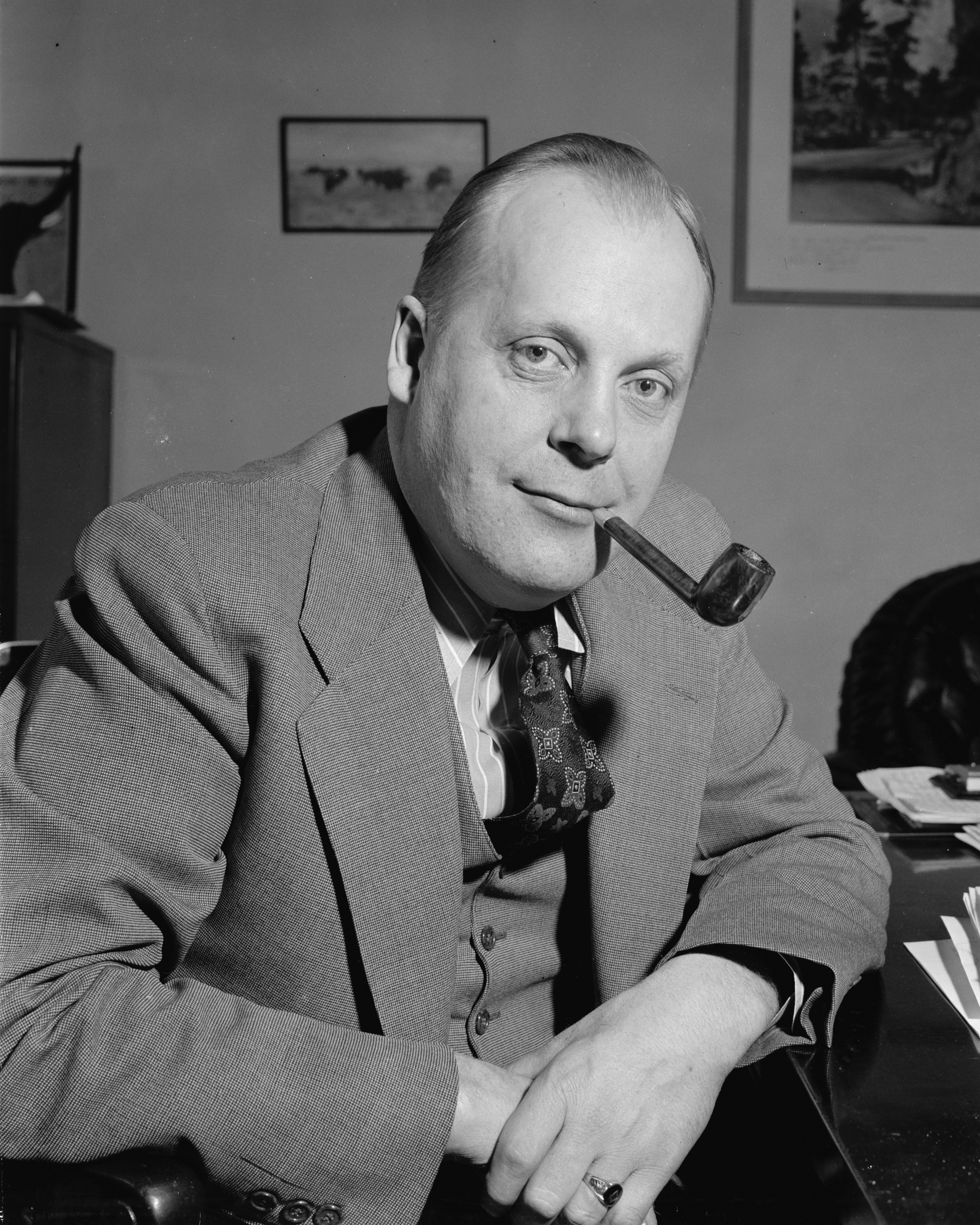
U.S. Representative Karl E. Mundt (1940) supported the Mundt Bill while serving on the House Un-American Activities Committee

In early 1948, US Representatives Mundt and Nixon began formulating an anti-communist bill, formally House Resolution 5852, Subversive Activities Control Act of 1948, which passed the House in May 1948.

=== Activities ===
On June 1, 1948, Henry A. Wallace supporters visibly "took command" of a march on Washington to stop the Mundt-Nixon Bill from passing the Senate. Former congressional representative Jerry J. O'Connell became chairman of a "Committee to Defeat the Mundt Bill." The committee claimed that more than 5,000 would march on Washington on June 2. In early June 1948, the bill died in the US Senate as the 1948 United States presidential election season commenced with conventions. (See Mundt-Nixon Bill.)

The group continued existence long enough to face the next iteration of the Mundt-Nixon Bill, namely the Mundt–Ferguson Communist Registration Bill AKA the "Mundt-Ferguson Bill."

It is unclear when exactly the group dissolved. During hearings in 1955, O'Connell indicated that NCDMB ended when Congress overruled President Truman's veto of the Subversive Activities Control Act of 1950, more commonly known as the McCarran Internal Security Act, i.e., September 22, 1950. HUAC's annual report for 1950 cited an unspecified date in September 1950.

== HUAC report ==
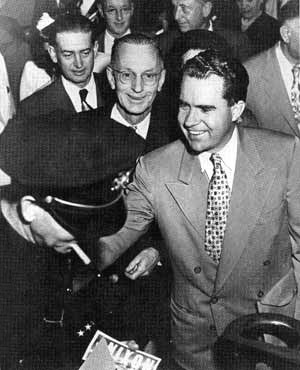
U.S. Representative Richard M. Nixon (1950) supported the Mundt Bill while serving on HUAC

On December 7, 1950, HUAC issued a 15-page Report on National Committee to Defeat the Mundt Bill: A Communist Lobby. At that time, HUAC's senior investigator was Louis J. Russell and director of research Benjamin Mandel. HUAC had successfully subpoenaed months of Western Union telegrams and telephone records between the committee and the National Lawyers Guild and tied both organizations to the Communist Party USA (CPUSA) and numerous Communist front organizations. HUAC also cited testimony from FBI undercover agent Matthew Cvetic.

The report concluded:

The Committee on Un-American Activities is unanimous in its belief that the National Committee to Defeat the Mundt Bill was organized not as a legitimate lobbying enterprise, but rather as a propaganda adjunct of the Communist Party. The work of this organization, in many instances, was performed by the Communist Party, and it was at all times wholly supported by the Communist Party.

(Note: The report states its "belief.")

== Organization ==
A number of NCDMB supporters also supported US Vice President Henry A. Wallace and his Progressive Party including Leo Isaacson, Arthur Miller, Louis Untermeyer, and Mark Van Doren (listed under "sponsors" below).

=== Structure ===
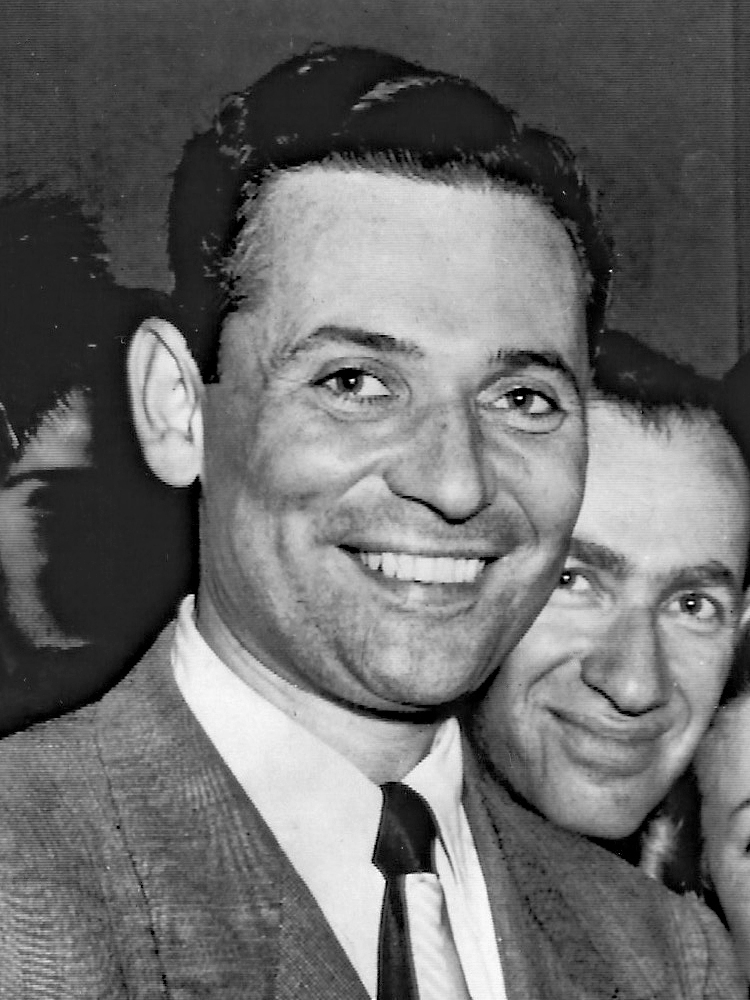
US Representative Leo Isacson (here, 1947) was an NCDMB member

The NCDMB has the following sub-organizations:

- Chicago Committee to Defeat the Mundt Bill
- Freedom House Committee to Defeat the Mundt Bill (Miami)
- New York Committee to Defeat the Mundt Bill
- San Francisco Committee to Oppose the Mundt-Ferguson Bill
- Santa Cruz Citizens Committee to Defeat the Mundt Bill
- Delaware Committee to Defeat the Mundt bill
- Philadelphia Committee to Defeat the Mundt Bill
- New Jersey Citizens Committee Against the Mundt Bill
- Colorado Committee to Defeat the Mundt Bill

Major financial contributors to NCDMB included:

- Mrs. Luke I. Wilson (executive board member of the Southern Conference for Human Welfare)
- United Electrical, Radio and Machine Workers of America (UE)
- New York Committee to Defeat the Mundt Bill (led by Isadore Blumberg)
- Elisabeth Sasuly
- Thomas G. Buchanan Jr. (legislative director of the Civil Rights Congress)
- George B. Murphy Jr. (vice chairman of the American Committee for the Protection of Foreign Born and vice president of the International Workers Order).

=== Members ===
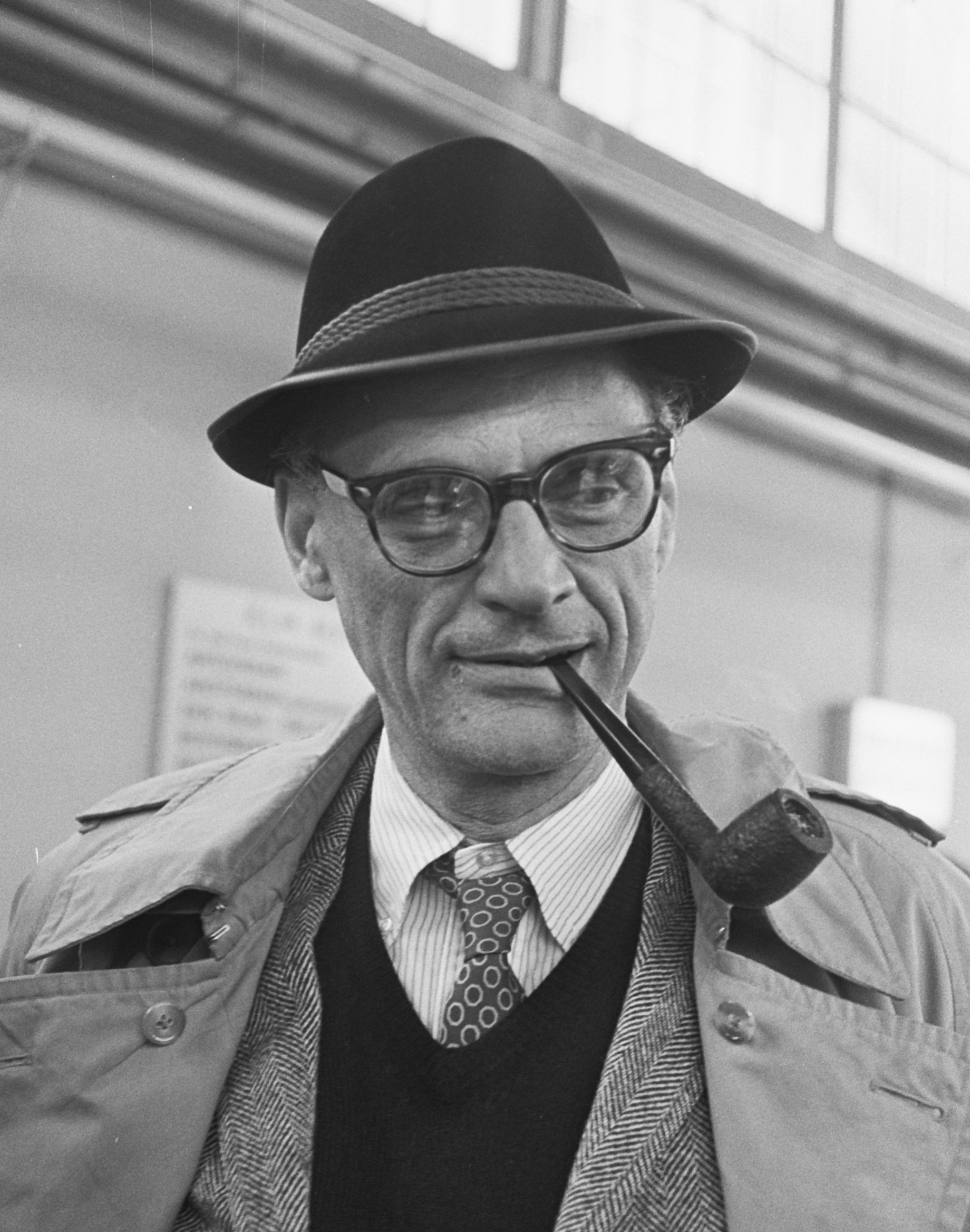
American playwright Arthur Miller (here, 1966) was an NCDMB member

NCDMB Officers included:

- Jerry J. O'Connell, chairman and registered lobbyist
- Bruce Waybur, treasurer
- Edith Pratt, executive treasurer
- John B. Stone, registered lobbyist

NCDMB sponsors included:

- Rabbi Michael Alper
- Hon. Thurman Arnold
- Stringfellow Barr
- Mr. and Mrs. Theodore O. Behre
- Angela Bambace
- Elmer Austin Benson
- Hon. John T. Bernard
- Edwin Bjorkman
- Algernon D. Black
- Scott Buchanan
- Dr. Robert K. Burns
- LaVonne Busch
- Angus Cameron
- Prof. A. J. Carlson
- Prof. Zechariah Chafee
- Rabbi J. X. Cohen
- Hon. Benjamin J. Davis
- Earl B. Dickerson
- James Durkin
- Clifford J. Durr
- Prof. Thomas I. Emerson
- Prof. Henry Pratt Fairchild
- Edward E. Fisher
- Abram Flaxer
- Clark Foreman
- Rev. Stephen H. Fritchman
- Jerry Gilliam
- Josiah W. Gitt
- Percy Greene
- Prof. Fowler Harper
- Donald Henderson
- Charles Hamilton Houston
- Rev. Kenneth DeP. Hughes
- James Imbrie
- Hon. Leo Isacson
- Francis Fisher Kane
- Robert W. Kenny
- Paul J. Kern
- Prof. Curtis D. MacDougall
- James McLeish
- Rev. Jack McMichael
- Dr. Alexander Meiklejohn
- Samuel D. Menin
- Arthur Miller
- Hon. Fred G. Moritt
- Prof. Stuart Mudd
- Hon. Stanley Novak
- Grant Oakes
- Oliver T. Palmer
- Father Clarence Parker
- Max Perlow
- Morris Pizer
- Abraham Pomerantz
- Judge Joseph H. Rainey
- Prof. William G. Rice
- O. John Rogge
- Paul Ross
- Prof. Frederick L. Schuman
- Prof. Karl Shapiro
- Prof. Harlow Shapley
- I.F. Stone
- Dr. Joseph W. Straley
- Dr. Alva W. Taylor
- Mary Church Terrell
- Louis Untermeyer
- Mark Van Doren
- Dr. Harry F. Ward
- Mary van Kleeck

A House document states that US Senator James E. Murray of Montana had close Communist front ties with the Daily Worker newspaper, Soviet Russia Today magazine, the National Lawyers Guild, and the International Workers Order as well as known affiliation with Jerry J. O'Connell of NCMDB.

== Works ==
- Report on National Committee to Defeat the Mundt Bill: A Communist Lobby

== See also ==
- Mundt-Nixon Bill
- Mundt–Ferguson Communist Registration Bill
- McCarran Internal Security Act
