= Mundt–Ferguson Communist Registration Bill =

1950 proposed US Red Scare legislation

The Mundt–Ferguson Communist Registration Bill was a proposed law that would have required all members of the Communist Party of the United States register with the Attorney General.

== Antecedent bills ==
In 1940, the U.S. Congress passed the Smith Act.

In 1948, the House proposed the Mundt–Nixon Bill, or "Subversive Activities Control Act [of] 1948", as H.R. (House Resolution) 5852, which sought registration of Communist Party members and sources for printed and broadcast material issued by Communist fronts. On May 19, 1948, the bill passed the House by 319 to 58. The Senate Judicial Committee held hearings at the end of May 1948 "the purpose of receiving testimony and opinions in relation to the constitutionality and practicality of H. R. 5852". However, the United States Senate did not act on the bill.

== Mundt–Ferguson Bill of 1950 ==
In 1950, the bill was re-introduced two years later, as the Mundt-Ferguson bill (also known as the Subversive Activities Control Bill). Again it was passed by the House of Representatives but failed in the Senate.

On March 4, 1950, the Senate Judiciary Committee passed a "New Mundt Bill" by 8 to 1. According to The New York Times, "the revised Mundt bill would specifically make it a crime, in peace or war, for any Federal employee to transmit secret information to a foreign agent or to a member of a Communist organization. The employees, as well as those receiving the data, would subject to maximum penalties of ten years in jail and $10,000 fines." The same penalties would go to anyone of conspiring to foster establishment of a "totalitarian dictatorship".

== McCarran Internal Security Act ==
U.S. Senator Pat McCarran then took many of the provisions from the bill and included them in legislation he introduced that became the McCarran Internal Security Act, which passed both houses of Congress in 1950.

== See also ==
- Smith Act of 1940
- Mundt–Nixon Bill of 1948
- McCarran Internal Security Act of 1950
- Subversive Activities Control Board
- National Committee to Defeat the Mundt Bill
