= McCarran Internal Security Act =

1950 US anti-communist subversion statute

- Other short titles: McCarran Act; Subversive Activities Control Act of 1950
- Long title: An Act to protect the United States against certain un-American and subversive activities by requiring registration of Communist organizations, and for other purposes.
- Nicknames: Internal Security Act of 1950, Concentration Camp Law
- Enacted by: the 81st United States Congress
- Effective: September 23, 1950

Citations
- Public law: Pub. L. 81–831
- Statutes at Large: 64 Stat. 987

Codification
- Titles amended: 50 U.S.C.: War and National Defense
- U.S.C. sections created: 50 U.S.C. ch. 23, subch. I § 781 et seq.

Legislative history
- Introduced in the Senate as S. 4037 by Pat McCarran (D-NV) on August 10, 1950; Committee consideration by Judiciary Committee; Passed the Senate on September 12, 1950 (70–7); Passed the House on August 29, 1950 (354–20); Reported by the joint conference committee on September 20, 1950; agreed to by the House on September 20, 1950 (313–20) and by the Senate on September 20, 1950 (51–7); Vetoed by President Harry S. Truman on September 22, 1950; Overridden by the House on September 22, 1950 (286–48); Overridden by the Senate and became law on September 22, 1950 (57–10)

United States Supreme Court cases
- Carlson v. Landon, 342 U.S. 524 (1952); United States v. Spector, 343 U.S. 169 (1952); Heikkila v. Barber, 345 U.S. 229 (1953); Galvan v. Press, 347 U.S. 522 (1954); Communist Party of United States v. Subversive Activities Control Bd., 351 U.S. 115 (1956); United States v. Witkovich, 353 U.S. 194 (1957); Rowoldt v. Perfetto, 355 U.S. 115 (1957); Bonetti v. Rogers, 356 U.S. 691 (1958); Kent v. Dulles, 357 U.S. 116 (1958)

The Internal Security Act of 1950, 64 Stat. 987 (Public Law 81-831), also known as the Subversive Activities Control Act of 1950, the McCarran Act after its principal sponsor Sen. Pat McCarran (D-Nevada), or the Concentration Camp Law, is a United States federal law. Congress enacted it over President Harry Truman's veto. It required communist organizations to register with the federal government. The 1965 U.S. Supreme Court ruling in Albertson v. Subversive Activities Control Board saw much of the act's communist registration requirement abolished. The emergency detention provision was repealed when the Non-Detention Act of 1971 was signed into law by President Richard Nixon. The act's Subversive Activities Control Board, which enforced the law's provision calling for investigations of persons engaging in "subversive activities," would also be abolished in 1972.

== Provisions ==
Its titles were I: Subversive Activities Control (Subversive Activities Control Act) and II: Emergency Detention (Emergency Detention Act of 1950).

The Act required Communist organizations to register with the United States Attorney General and established the Subversive Activities Control Board to investigate persons suspected of engaging in subversive activities or otherwise promoting the establishment of a "totalitarian dictatorship", either fascist or communist. Members of these groups could not become citizens and in some cases were barred from entering or leaving the country. Immigrants found in violation of the act within five years of being naturalized could have their citizenship revoked.

United States Attorney General J. Howard McGrath asked that the CPUSA provide a list of all its members in the United States, as well as 'reveal its financial details.' Furthermore, members of 'Communist-Action Organizations' including those of the Communist Party of the United States of America were required (prior to a 1965 Supreme Court case mentioned below) to register with the U.S. Attorney General their name and address and be subject to the statutes applicable to such registrants (e.g. being barred from federal employment, among others). In addition, once registered, members were liable for prosecution solely based on membership under the Smith Act due to the expressed and alleged intent of the organization.

The Act also contained an emergency detention statute, giving the President the authority to apprehend and detain "each person as to whom there is a reasonable ground to believe that such person probably will engage in, or probably will conspire with others to engage in, acts of espionage or sabotage."

It tightened alien exclusion and deportation laws and allowed for the detention of dangerous, disloyal, or subversive persons in times of war or "internal security emergency". The act had implications for thousands of people displaced because of the Second World War. In March 1951, chairman of the United States Displaced Persons Commission was quoted as saying that 100,000 people would be barred from entering the United States that otherwise would have been accepted. By March 1, 1951, the act had excluded 54,000 people of German ethnic origin and 12,000 displaced Russian persons from entering the United States. Notable persons barred from the United States include Ernst Chain, who was declined a visa on two occasions in 1951.

The Act made picketing a Federal courthouse a felony if intended to obstruct the court system or influence jurors or other trial participants.

== Legislative history ==
=== Passage ===
Several key sections of the Act were taken from the earlier Mundt–Ferguson Communist Registration Bill, which Congress had failed to pass.

It included language that Sen. Mundt had introduced several times before without success aimed at punishing federal employees for passing information "classified by the President (or by the head of any such department, agency, or corporation with the approval of the President) as affecting the security of the United States" to "any representative of a foreign government or to any officer or member of a Communist organization". He told a Senate hearing that it was a response to what the House Un-American Activities Committee (HUAC) had learned when investigating "the so-called pumpkin papers case, the espionage activities in the Chambers-Hiss case, the Bentley case, and others."

President Harry Truman vetoed it on September 22, 1950, and sent Congress a lengthy veto message in which he criticized specific provisions as "the greatest danger to freedom of speech, press, and assembly since the Alien and Sedition Laws of 1798," a "mockery of the Bill of Rights" and a "long step toward totalitarianism".

The House overrode the veto without debate by a vote of 286–48 the same day. The Senate overrode his veto the next day after "a twenty-two hour continuous battle" by a vote of 57–10. Thirty-one Republicans and 26 Democrats voted in favor, while five members of each party opposed it. Democratic Senator Hubert Humphrey led the outnumbered opposition in the Senate despite having voted in favor of the law the first time.

=== Amended ===
Part of the Act was repealed by the Non-Detention Act of 1971 after facing public opposition, notably from Japanese Americans. President Richard Nixon, while signing the repeal bill, referred to the internment of Japanese-Americans during World War II for historical context as to why the bill needed to be repealed.

For example, violation of 50 U.S.C. § 797 (Section 21 of "the Internal Security Act of 1950"), which concerns security of military bases and other sensitive installations, may be punishable by a prison term of up to one year.

The part of the act codified as 50 U.S.C. § 798 has been repealed in its entirety for violating the First Amendment.

=== Abolition ===
The Subversive Activities Control Board was abolished by Congress in 1972.

== Constitutionality ==
Civil libertarians and radical political activists considered the McCarran Act to be a dangerous and unconstitutional infringement of political liberty, as exemplified in this 1961 poster.

The Supreme Court of the United States was initially deferential towards the Internal Security Act. For example, in Galvan v. Press, the Court upheld the deportation of a Mexican alien on the basis that he had briefly been a member of the Communist Party from 1944 to 1946, even though such membership had been lawful at that time (and had been declared retroactively illegal by the Act).

As McCarthyism faded into history, the Court adopted a more skeptical approach towards the Act. The 1964 decision in Aptheker v. Secretary of State ruled unconstitutional Section 6, which prevented any member of a communist party from using or obtaining a passport. In 1965, the Court voted 8–0 in Albertson v. Subversive Activities Control Board to invalidate the Act's requirement that members of the Communist Party were to register with the government. It held that the information which party members were required to submit could form the basis of their prosecution for being party members, which was then a crime, and therefore deprived them of their Fifth Amendment right against self-incrimination. In 1967, the act's provision prohibiting communists from working for the federal government or at defense facilities was also struck down by the Supreme Court as a violation of the First Amendment's right to freedom of association in United States v. Robel.

== Use by U.S. military ==
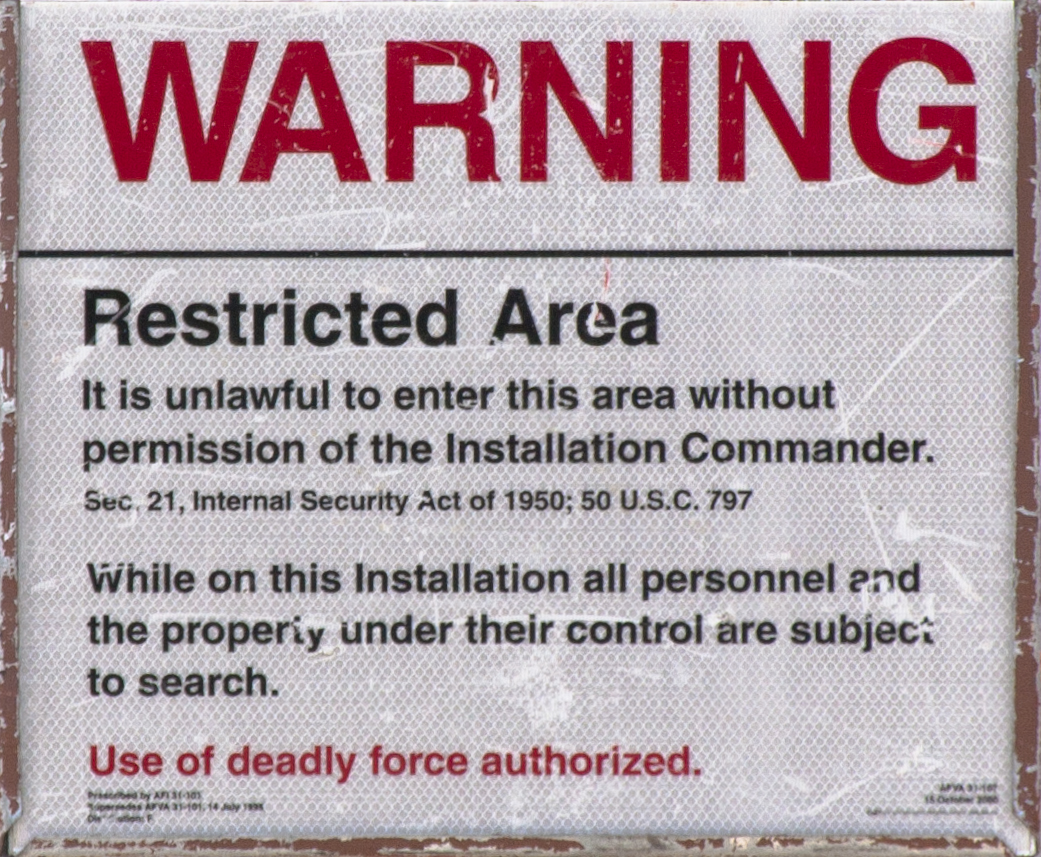
A no trespassing sign at Langley Air Force Base, citing section 21 of Internal Security Act of 1950/50 U.S.C. § 797.

The U.S. military continues to use 50 U.S.C. § 797, citing it in U.S. Army regulation AR 190–11 in support of allowing installation commanders to regulate privately owned weapons on army installations. An Army message known as an ALARACT states "senior commanders have specific authority to regulate privately owned weapons, explosives, and ammunition on army installations." The ALARACT refers to AR 190-11 and public law (section 1062 of Public Law 111–383, also known as the National Defense Authorization Act for Fiscal Year 2011); AR 190–11 in turn cites the McCarran Internal Security Act (codified as 50 USC 797). The ALARACT reference is a truncated version of the public law.

== Fictional reimagining ==
The 1971 pseudo-documentary film Punishment Park speculated what might have happened if Richard Nixon had enforced the McCarran Act against members of the anti-war movement, black power movement, the feminist movement, and others.

== See also ==
- Espionage Act of 1917
- Hatch Act of 1939
- Mundt–Nixon Bill of 1948
- National Committee to Defeat the Mundt Bill (1948–1950)
- Immigration and Nationality Act of 1952
