= Kathryn McHale =

American educator (1889–1956)

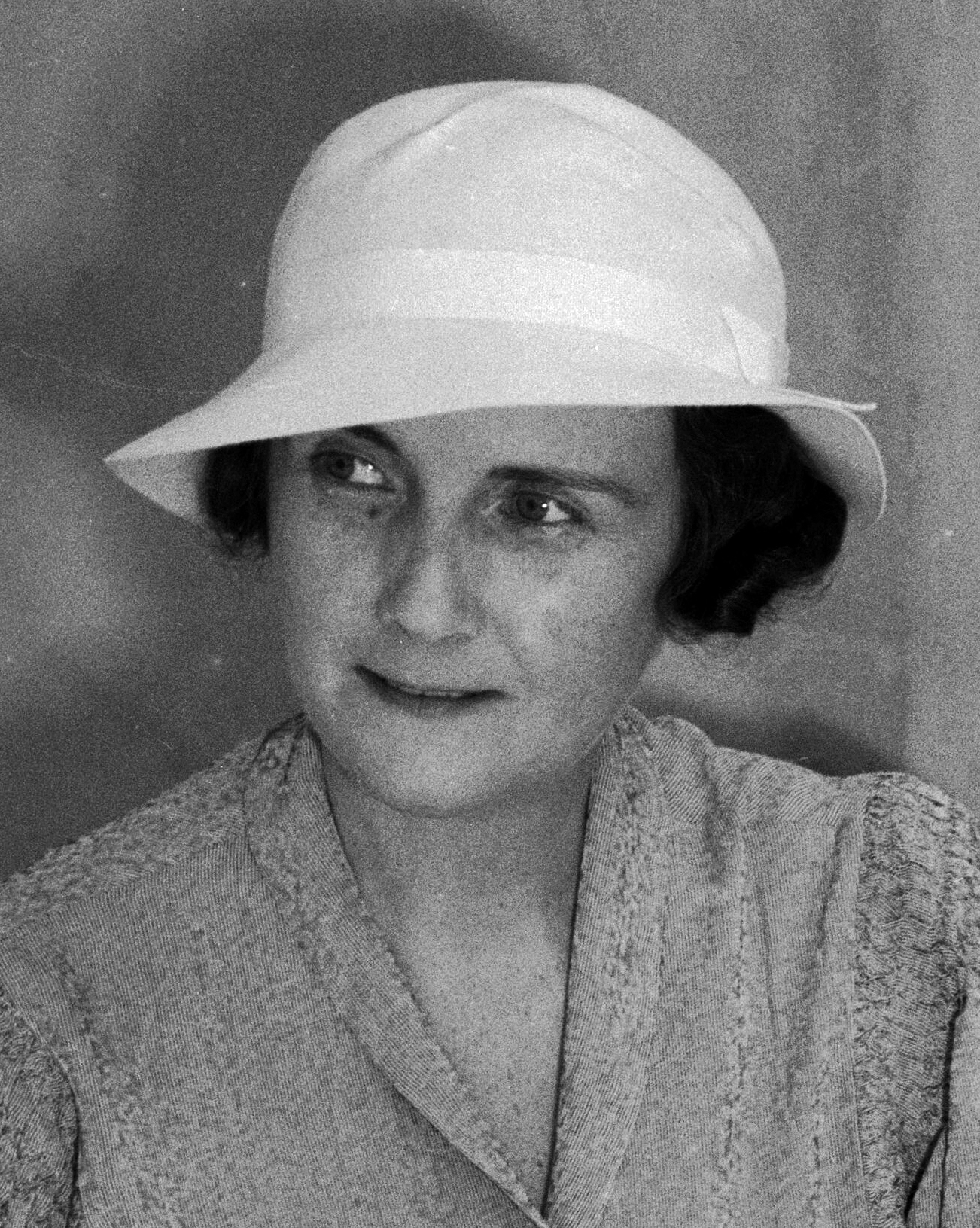
- Kathryn McHale in 1935
- Born: July 22, 1889; Logansport, Indiana
- Died: October 8, 1956; Washington, D.C.
- Occupation: Educator

Kathryn McHale (July 22, 1889 – October 8, 1956 ) was an American educator and psychologist. She was general director of the American Association of University Women (AAUW) from 1929 to 1950.

== Early life and education ==
Kathryn McHale was born in Logansport, Indiana, the daughter of Martin McHale and Margaret Farrell McHale. Her brother Frank M. McHale became a prominent lawyer and political figure. She earned a bachelor's degree at Teachers College, Columbia University in 1919, followed by a master's degree in 1920, and a PhD in psychology in 1926. Her dissertation was titled Comparative Psychology and Hygiene of the Overweight Child (1926).

== Career ==
McHale taught school in Logansport as a young woman. After completing her doctorate, she joined the faculty of Goucher College in Maryland, and became a full professor there in 1927. She left Goucher in 1935. She also taught at New York University, Carleton College, and the University of Minnesota. She was on the board of trustees of Purdue University from 1937 to 1946. She was active in policy work with UNESCO, the United States Office of Education, and the American Association of Adult Education, among other bodies.

McHale was general director of the American Association of University Women (AAUW) from 1929 to 1950. "McHale's skills in organization building and the sense of professionalism she passed on to the Association members meshed well with the Depression era's climate of public activism," noted historian Susan Levine in 1995. McHale took particular interest in women's health issues, encouraging AAUW members to learn about the early detection for cancer in the 1930s, when such campaigns were rare. But she steered the organization away from addressing the legalization of birth control, which she opposed personally, and which she worried would cause a split in AAUW's membership. She similarly avoided making decisions about racial integration of the AAUW; her standard response to inquiries was that "no one has pressed the issue of branch membership, and naturally I do not care for the issue to arise." However, in 1946, the national board of the AAUW instructed that branches should not discriminate against applicants on the basis of race, religion or political affiliation.

After leaving the AAUW executive office, McHale was the longest-serving member of the Subversive Activities Control Board, appointed in 1950 during the Truman administration, and remaining involved until May 1956, a few months before her death.

== Publications ==
McHale mostly published in the fields of educational administration and developmental psychology, with articles in journals including Journal of Applied Psychology, Journal of Higher Education, Childhood Education, The Psychological Clinic, and Teachers College Record. She also co-authored publications of the AAUW.

- "An Experimental Study of Vocational Interests of a Liberal Arts College Group" (1924)
- "An Information Test of Interests" (1930)
- "Changes in the Colleges" (1931)
- "Special Education for Parents and Teachers" (1931)
- The Infant and The Toddler (1931, with Elizabeth Moore Manwell)
- Pre-adolescence: Its Development and Adjustments (1932)
- Adolescence: Its Problems and Guidance (1932, with Frances Valiant Speek and Harriet Ahlers Houdlette)
- "Future Possibilities in Liberal-Arts Education: Some Expert Opinions" (1932)
- "Education for Women" (!935)
- Newer Aspects of Collegiate Education: A Study Guide (1936, with Frances Valiant Speek)

== Personal life ==
McHale had a stroke and died in Washington, D.C. in 1956, aged 67 years.
