= Non-Detention Act =

1971 United States federal statute

- Long title: An Act to amend title 18, United States Code, to prohibit the establishment of detention camps, and for other purposes.
- Nicknames: Non-Detention Act of 1971
- Enacted by: the 92nd United States Congress
- Effective: September 25, 1971

Citations
- Public law: 92-128
- Statutes at Large: 85 Stat. 347

Codification
- Titles amended: 18 U.S.C.: Crimes and Criminal Procedure
- U.S.C. sections amended: 18 U.S.C. ch. 301 § 4001

Legislative history
- Introduced in the House as H.R. 234 by Spark Matsunaga (D–HI) on April 6, 1971; Committee consideration by House Judiciary; Passed the House on September 14, 1971 (356-49); Passed the Senate on September 16, 1971 (Passed, in lieu of S. 592); Signed into law by President Richard Nixon on September 25, 1971

The Non-Detention Act of 1971 is a United States statute enacted to repeal portions of the McCarran Internal Security Act of 1950, specifically Title II, the "Emergency Detention Act". The law repealed the Emergency Detention Act of 1950 provisioning the United States Attorney General with powers for detention of anyone in the US deemed to be a threat to the national security of the United States. The 64 Stat. 1019 statute was codified within Title 50 War and National Defense as 50 U.S.C. ch. 23, subch. II §§ 811-826.

H.R. 234 was passed by the 92nd United States Congressional session and enacted into law by the 37th President of the United States Richard Nixon on September 25, 1971.

== Contents ==
The McCarran Internal Security Act of 1950 allowed for the detention of suspected subversives without the Constitutional steps required for imprisonment. The Non-Detention Act requires specific Congressional authorization for such detention. Passed as Public Law 92-128, 85 Stat. 347 (1971), it was codified at 18 U.S.C. § 4001(a).

§ 4001. Limitation on detention

(a) No citizen shall be imprisoned or otherwise detained by the United States except pursuant to an Act of Congress.

The statute was used to challenge military detention of U.S. citizens accused of terrorist activity. A Congressional Research Service report on the history of the Non-Detention Act concluded,

Legislative debate, committee reports, and the political context of 1971 indicate that when Congress enacted Section 4001(a) it intended the statutory language to restrict all detentions by the executive branch, not merely those by the Attorney General. Lawmakers, both supporters and opponents of Section 4001(a), recognized that it would restrict the President and military authorities.

== Judicial Proceeding of Law ==
The Supreme Court of the United States originally took the case of Rumsfeld v. Padilla to decide whether Congress's Authorization for Use of Military Force authorized the President to detain a U.S. citizen, but did not give an answer, instead ruling that the case had been improperly filed.

== See also ==
- Espionage Act of 1917
- Ex parte Quirin (1942)
- Hollywood blacklist
- House Un-American Activities Committee
- Korematsu v. United States (1944)
- Red Scare
- Rex 84
