= Commissioner v. LoBue =

- Supreme Court of the United States

Argued May 6, 1956 Decided May 28, 1956
- Full case name: Commissioner of Internal Revenue v. Philip J. LoBue
- Citations: 351 U.S. 243 (more) 76 S. Ct. 800; 100 L. Ed. 2d 1142

Case history
- Prior: 223 F.2d 367 (3d Cir. 1955) (reversed and remanded)

Holding
- The transfer of stock to the employee for less than its value was taxable compensation, notwithstanding the employer's purpose to confer a proprietary interest on the employee.

Court membership
- Chief Justice Earl Warren Associate Justices Hugo Black · Stanley F. Reed; Felix Frankfurter · William O. Douglas; Harold H. Burton · Tom C. Clark; Sherman Minton · John M. Harlan II

Case opinions
- Majority: Black, joined by Warren, Reed, Frankfurter, Douglas, Clark, Minton
- Concurrence: Frankfurter, joined by Clark
- Concur/dissent: Harlan, joined by Burton

Laws applied
- Internal Revenue Code of 1939

Commissioner v. LoBue, 351 U.S. 243 (1956), was a case before the United States Supreme Court in which the court held that the transfer of stock to the employee for less than its value was taxable compensation, notwithstanding the employer's purpose to confer a proprietary interest on the employee.

== Background ==
=== Facts ===
Respondent's company offered stock options to its employees based on their performance and continued employment. Respondent exercised the options offered.

In recognition of his "contribution and efforts in making the operation of the Company successful," a corporation gave an employee options to purchase stock in the corporation. The options were nontransferable and were contingent upon continued employment. After some time had elapsed and the value of the shares had increased, the employee exercised the options and purchased the stock at less than the then current market price. For some of the shares, he gave the employer a promissory note for the option price; but the shares were not delivered until the notes were paid in cash, when the value of the shares had increased.

=== Tax return ===
The employee did not report as taxable income any of the gain resulting from the exercise of the option

=== Commissioner of Internal Revenue ===
The Internal Revenue Service levied a deficiency assessment against him.

=== Tax court ===
Respondent appealed and the Tax Court held that the options were granted to provide respondent with a proprietary interest in the company and not as compensation and they were not taxable.

=== Third Circuit ===
The Third Circuit affirmed a Tax Court decision that found stock options exercised by respondent represented a proprietary interest in a corporation and not compensation for services.

== Opinion of the court ==
On certiorari, reversed and remanded. Black wrote for a 5-4 Court.

The Court held that the interpretation given to § 22(a) of the Internal Revenue Code of 1939 was too narrow and that the options were compensation, includible as taxable income. The matter was reversed and remanded to the appellate court with instructions to remand to the lower court for further proceedings to determine the question of whether delivery of a binding promissory note marked the completion of the stock purchase for purposes of measuring taxable gain.

The Court held that the transfer of stock to the employee for less than its value was taxable compensation, notwithstanding the employer's purpose to confer a proprietary interest on the employee. The majority held, further, that the employee's gain was realized in the year that the options were exercised, and was to be measured as of the time of the exercise of the options, and not of the grant thereof.

Held:

Under the Internal Revenue Code of 1939, as amended, the resulting gain to the employee was taxable as income received at the time he exercised the option and purchased the stock, and his taxable gain should be measured as of the time when the options were exercised and not as of the time when they were granted. pp. 244–250.

(a) In defining "gross income" as broadly as it did in § 22 (a) of the Internal Revenue Code of 1939, as amended, Congress intended to tax all gains except those specifically exempted. P. 246.

(b) The only exemption that could possibly apply to these transactions is the gift exemption of § 22 (b)(3), and these transactions were not "gifts" in the statutory sense. pp. 246–247.

(c) There is no statutory basis for excluding such transactions from "gross income" on the ground that one purpose of the employer was to confer on the employee a "proprietary interest" in the business. P. 247.

(d) The employee received a substantial economic and financial benefit from his employer, prompted by the employer's desire to get better work from the employee, and this is "compensation for personal service" within the meaning of § 22 (a). P. 247.

(e) In these circumstances, the employee "realized" a taxable gain when he purchased the stock. P. 248.

(f) The employee's taxable gain should be measured by the difference between the option price and the market value of the shares as of the time when the options were exercised and not as of the time when the options were granted. pp. 248–249.

(g) On remand, the Tax Court may consider the question, not previously passed on, whether delivery of a promissory note for the purchase price marked the completion of the stock purchase and whether the gain should be measured as of that date or as of the date the note was paid. P. 250.

=== Concurrence ===
Frankfurter and Clark, concurring in the judgment of the majority and in its opinion on the main issue, stated that, since the time when the employee acquired the taxable interest was not an issue either before the Tax Court or the Court of Appeals, the majority had erred in departing from the general rule whereby the Supreme Court abstains from passing on such an issue in a tax case when that issue was not raised below.

=== Concurrence in part, dissent in part ===
Harlan, joined by Burton, concurring in part and dissenting in part, took the view that the taxable event was the grant of the options, and not their exercise, with the result that the gain to the taxpayer was to be measured as of the date of the grant of the options.

== See also ==
- List of United States Supreme Court cases, volume 351
