= List of United States Supreme Court cases, volume 351 =

This is a list of all the United States Supreme Court cases from volume 351 of the United States Reports:

Case name	Citation	Date decided
Squire v. Capoeman	351 U.S. 1	1956
Griffin v. Illinois	351 U.S. 12	1956
Frozen Food Express v. United States	351 U.S. 40	1956
East Texas Motor Freight Lines, Inc. v. Frozen Food Express	351 U.S. 49	1956
Dixie Carriers, Inc. v. United States	351 U.S. 56	1956
Mine Workers v. Arkansas Oak Flooring Company	351 U.S. 62	1956
American Airlines, Inc. v. North American Airlines, Inc.	351 U.S. 79	1956
United States v. Zucca	351 U.S. 91	1956
National Labor Relations Board v. Babcock and Wilcox Company	351 U.S. 105	1956
Communist Party v. Subversive Activities Control Board	351 U.S. 115	1956
Berra v. United States	351 U.S. 131	1956
Covey v. Town of Somers	351 U.S. 141	1956
National Labor Relations Board v. Truitt Manufacturing Company	351 U.S. 149	1956
General Box Company v. United States	351 U.S. 159	1956
Hatahley v. United States	351 U.S. 173	1956
Cahill v. New York, New Haven and Hartford Railroad Company	351 U.S. 183	1956
United States v. Storer Broadcasting Company	351 U.S. 192	1956
Johnston v. United States	351 U.S. 215	1956
Railway Employee Department v. Hanson	351 U.S. 225	1956
Comm'r v. LoBue	351 U.S. 243	1956
Offutt Housing Company v. Sarpy County	351 U.S. 253	1956
Automobile Workers v. Wisconsin Employee Relations Board	351 U.S. 266	1956
Durley v. Mayo	351 U.S. 277	1956
Black v. Cutter Laboratories	351 U.S. 292	1956
United States v. McKesson and Robbins, Inc.	351 U.S. 305	1956
Denver and Rio Grand Western Railroad Company v. Union Pacific Railroad Company	351 U.S. 321	1956
Jay v. Boyd	351 U.S. 345	1956
United States v. E.I. du Pont de Nemours and Company	351 U.S. 377	1956
Sears Roebuck and Company v. Mackey	351 U.S. 427	1956
Cold Metal Process Company v. United Engineering and Foundry Company	351 U.S. 445	1956
United States ex rel. Darcy v. Handy	351 U.S. 454	1956
Kinsella v. Krueger	351 U.S. 470	1956
Reid v. Covert	351 U.S. 487	1956
Southern Pacific Company v. Gileo	351 U.S. 493	1956
Reed v. Pennsylvania Railroad Company	351 U.S. 502	1956
Parr v. United States	351 U.S. 513	1956
The Hoegh Silvercloud	351 U.S. 525	1956
Cole v. Young	351 U.S. 536	1956
De Sylva v. Ballentine	351 U.S. 570	1956
