= Jerry J. O'Connell =

American politician (1909–1965)

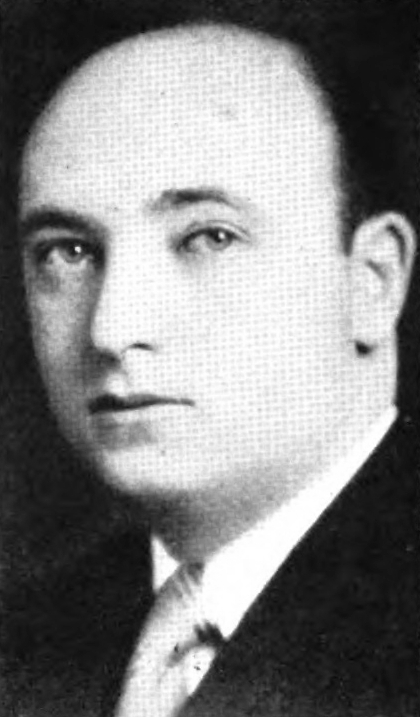
- O'Connell c. 1937

Member of the U.S. House of Representatives from Montana's 1st district
- In office January 3, 1937 – January 3, 1939
- Preceded by: Joseph P. Monaghan
- Succeeded by: Jacob Thorkelson

Member of the Montana Railroad and Public Service Commission
- In office January 7, 1935 – January 3, 1937
- Preceded by: Tom Stout
- Succeeded by: Edward E. Krebsbach

Member of the Montana House of Representatives from the Silver Bow County district
- In office January 5, 1931 – January 7, 1935

Personal details
- Born: Jeremiah Joseph O'Connell; June 14, 1909 Butte, Montana, U.S.
- Died: January 16, 1956 (aged 46) Great Falls, Montana, U.S.
- Resting place: Hillcrest Lawn Memorial Mausoleum; Great Falls, Montana, U.S.
- Party: Democratic
- Other political affiliations: Progressive (1948–1949)
- Spouse(s): Alvena Lois Smith (m. 1931, div. 1937); Mazie Elizabeth Richardson (m. 1937)
- Children: 2
- Education: Mount St. Charles College (A.B.)
- Profession: Politician, political organizer, attorney
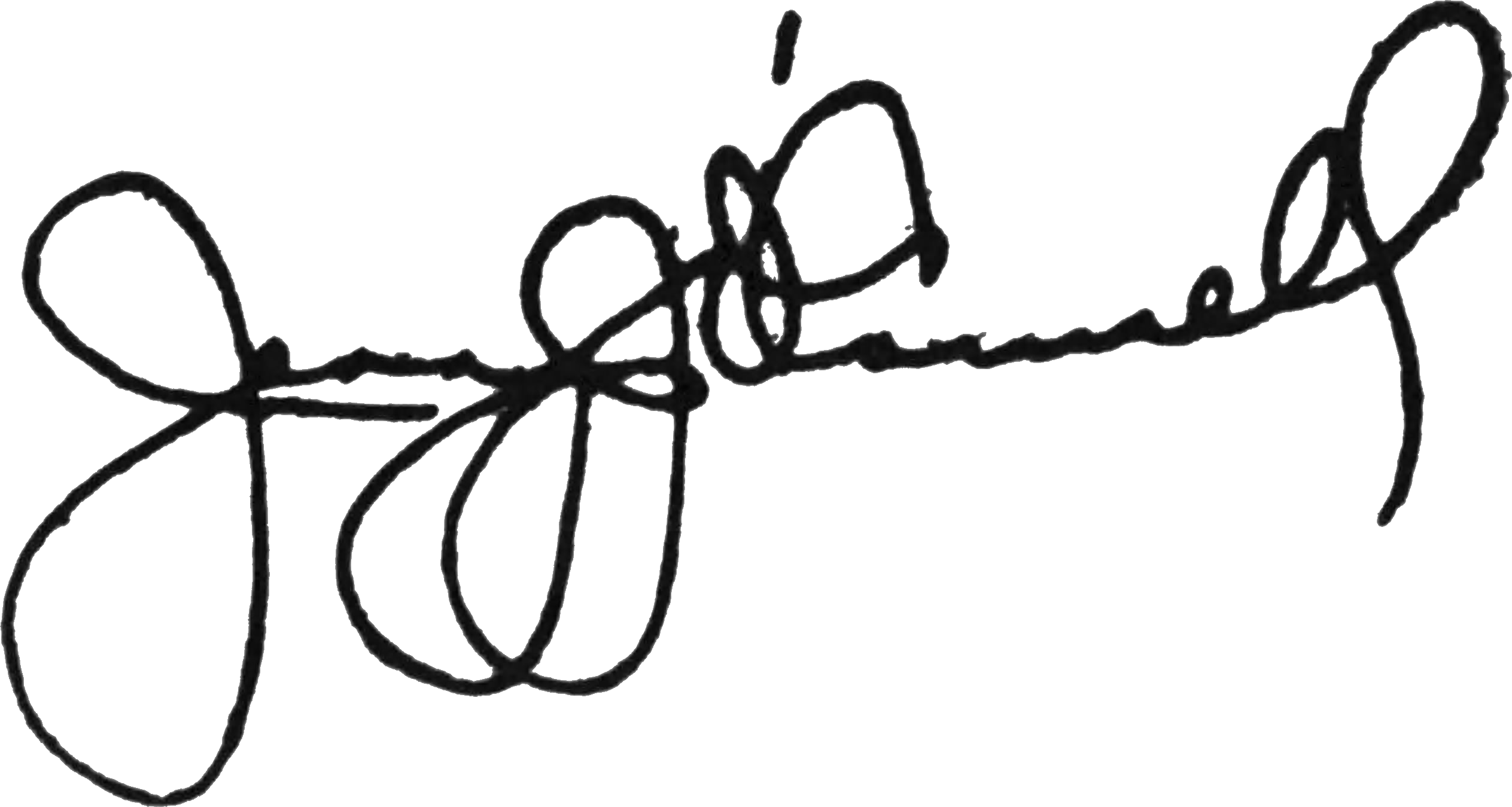
- Signature

Jeremiah Joseph O'Connell (June 14, 1909 – January 16, 1956) was an American attorney and politician. He is most notable for his service as a member of the United States House of Representatives from Montana.

A native of Butte, Montana, he graduated from Carroll College in Helena, and attended Columbus School of Law at Catholic University of America and Georgetown University. Elected to the Montana House of Representatives in 1930 at age 21, he served from 1931 to 1934, and was one of the youngest state legislators in Montana's history. He served on the state Public Service Commission from 1935 to 1937. In 1936, he was elected to the United States House of Representatives, and he served one term. O'Connell was an unsuccessful candidate for reelection in 1938, and for election to Congress in 1940.

O'Connell became involved in left wing politics beginning in the mid 1930s. In the 1940s, he was active in the state of Washington as a leader of the Democratic and Progressive parties, and was a backer of Henry A. Wallace in the 1948 presidential election. In 1950, O'Connell returned to Montana from Washington state. He was admitted to the bar and established a practice in Great Falls, Montana. He built a reputation as a capable criminal defense attorney, and practiced until his sudden death from a heart attack in 1956. O'Connell was buried in Great Falls.

== Background ==
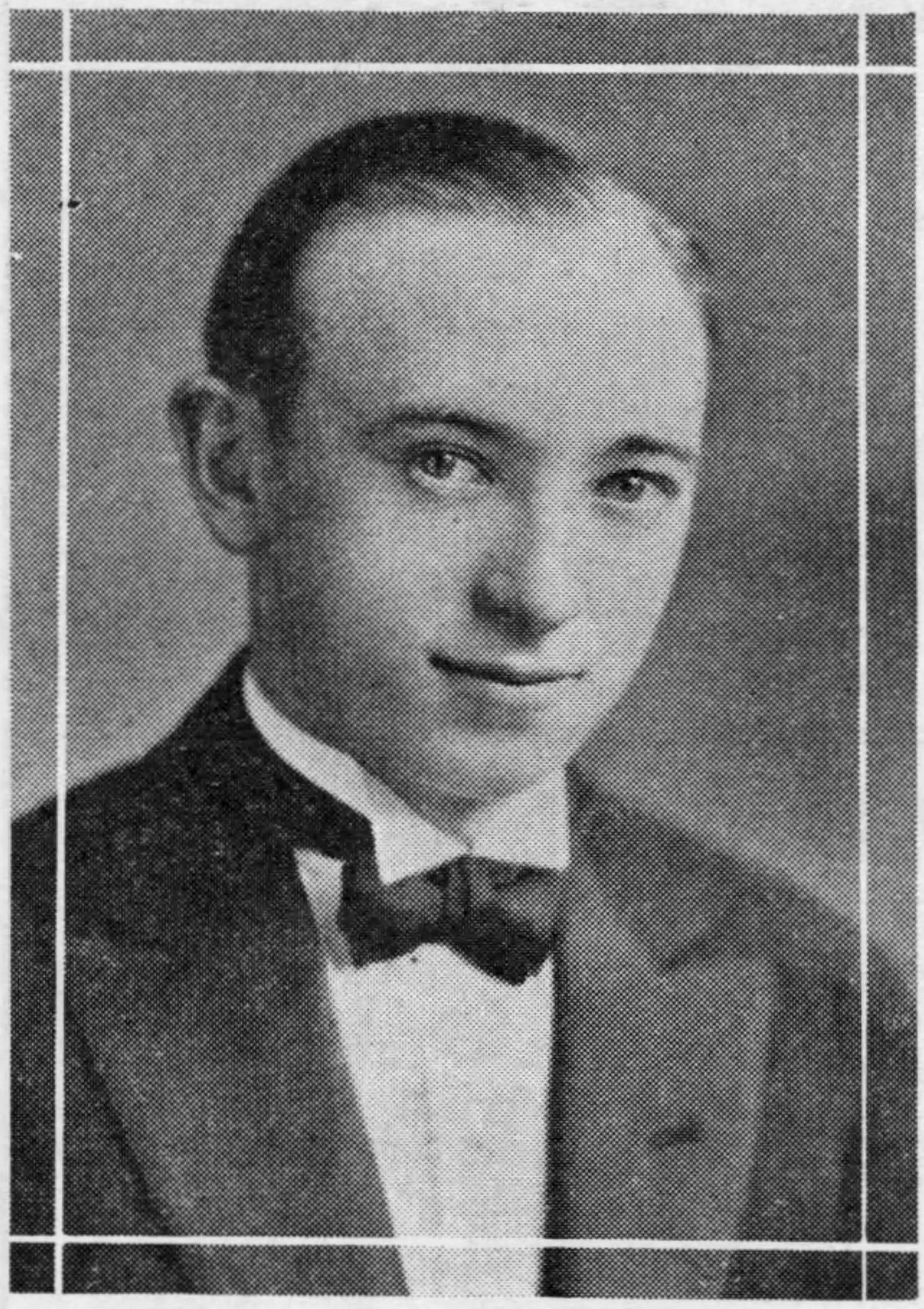
O'Connell in The Prospector, the school newspaper at Mount St. Charles College, March 25, 1927

Born in Butte, Montana on June 14, 1909, O'Connell attended the parochial schools of Butte, including St. Patrick's School and Butte Central Catholic High School. He graduated from Carroll College (formerly Mount St. Charles College) in Helena, Montana in 1931, and attended Columbus School of Law at Catholic University of America and Georgetown University while working on the staff of the Democratic National Committee.

== Career ==
=== Montana ===
O'Connell served in the Montana House of Representatives from 1931 to 1934. He served as member of the Montana Railroad and Public Service Commission from 1935 to 1937. He served as a delegate to all the Democratic State conventions between 1930 and 1940. In 1937, he spoke at a fundraiser for the North American Committee to Aid Spanish Democracy. In 1937 and 1938, he published articles in the New Masses magazine, a publication affiliated with the Communist Party USA. In May 1938, he spoke at an event for the International Labor Defense. By 1939, he was a member of the National Lawyers Guild. O'Connell's friend Robert Marshall was the chief of forestry in the Bureau of Indian Affairs from 1933 to 1937, and head of recreation management for the United States Forest Service from 1937 to 1939. Marshall died in 1939, and O'Connell was appointed head trustee of one of the foundations created by Marshall's will, the pro-conservation Robert Marshall Wilderness Fund, which worked to improve political coordination between organized labor, farm advocacy organizations, and advocates for the unemployed.

=== Washington, D.C. ===
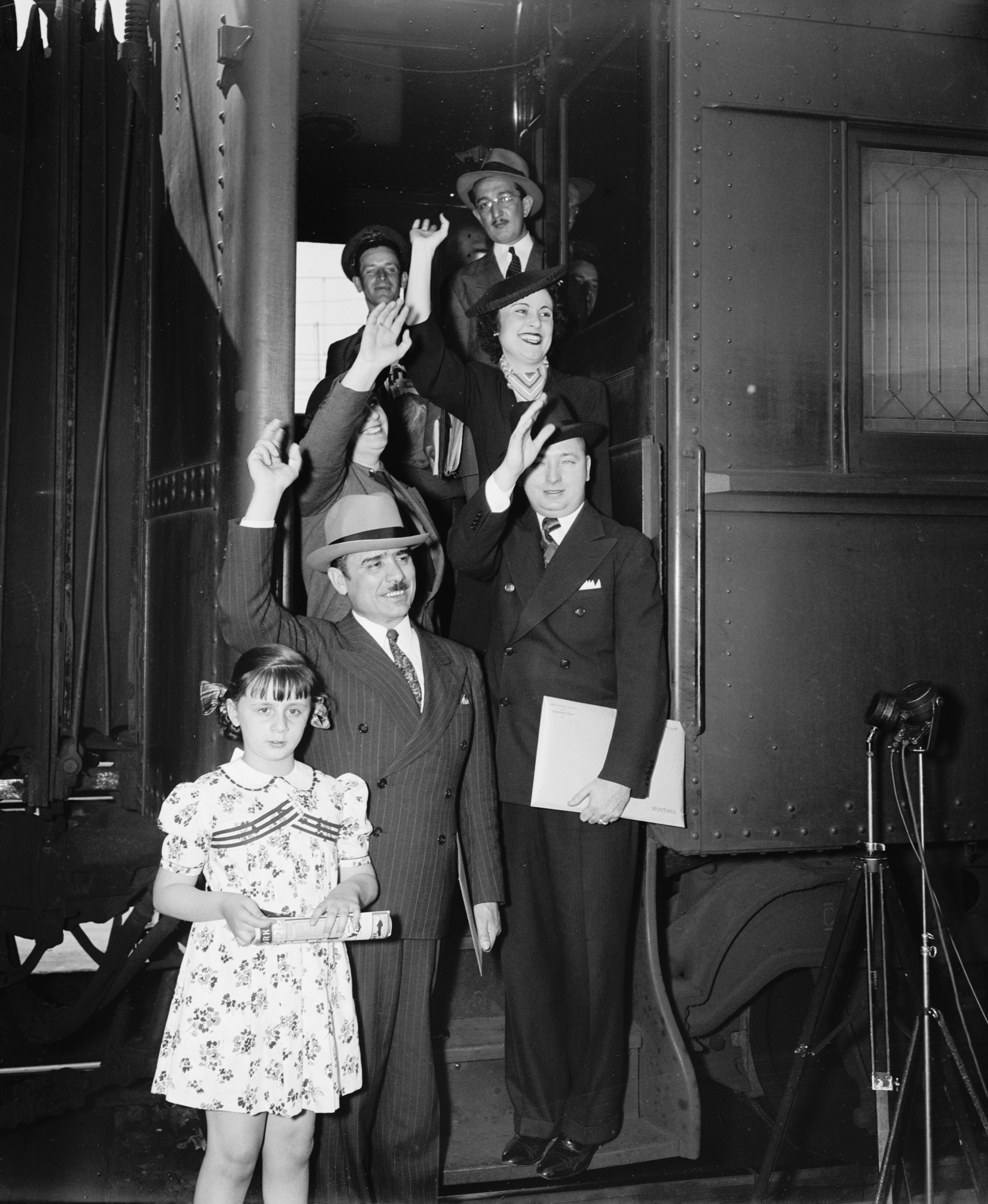
Representatives Bernard (left) and O'Connell (right) leave Union Station with their wives bound for Spain, May 7, 1938. The girl in front is Bernard's daughter.

O'Connell was elected as a Democrat to the Seventy–fifth Congress (January 3, 1937 – January 3, 1939). Although one of the first votes he cast was to approve an arms embargo against both sides of the Spanish Civil War, he later traveled to Spain with his friend, Congressman John Bernard of Minnesota. Bernard was a communist sympathizer, and O'Connell and Bernard were in Spain to demonstrate support for the Abraham Lincoln Brigade, one of the International Brigades organized by the Communist International to oppose the fascists led by Francisco Franco during the war. O'Connell ran unsuccessfully for reelection in 1938 to the Seventy–sixth Congress, and for election to the Seventy–seventh Congress in 1940. He also edited his own newspaper, Jerry O'Connell's Montana Liberal, from 1939 to 1940.

=== Washington State ===
O'Connell moved to Seattle, Washington, in June 1944. He served as executive secretary of the Washington State Democratic Central Committee from December 1944 to January 1947, for the Roosevelt Democrats in 1947, and for the Washington State Progressive Party in 1948 and 1949. He was also an instructor at the Seattle Labor School from 1946 to 1949. These affiliations later became the subject of questioning by Congressional investigators.

=== Return to Washington, D.C. ===
In June 1948, O'Connell served as chairman of the "National Committee to Defeat the Mundt Bill"; the Mundt–Nixon Bill had passed the U.S. House of Representatives but was stalled in the U.S. Senate. The bill would have required all members of the Communist Party of the United States to register with the U.S. Attorney General, but opponents were successful at preventing its passage. In June 1949, he signed a letter in support of the defendants in the Smith Act trials of Communist Party leaders.

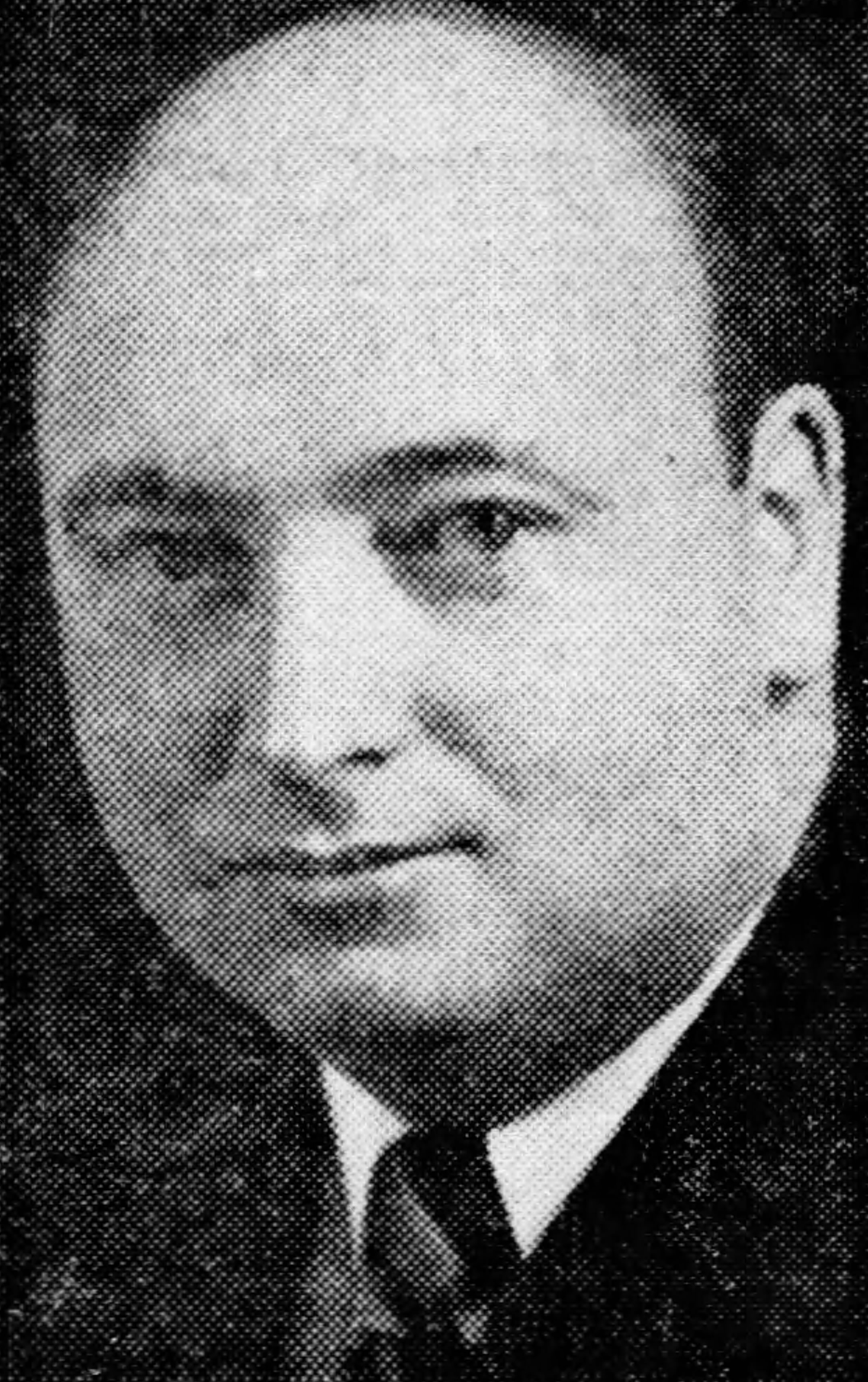
O'Connell c. 1951

=== Return to Montana ===
O'Connell completed his legal studies by reading law, and was admitted to the Montana bar in 1950. He practiced law in Great Falls until his death. In 1951, he defended Frank Dryman for the murder of Clarence Chester Pellett. O'Connell succeeded in each appeal, so that from 1952 to 1954 the Montana courts overturned two death sentences. In February 1955, Dryman received a life sentence.

== HUAC testimony ==
In 1950, the House Un-American Activities Committee (HUAC) singled out O'Connell as an alleged communist sympathizer in his role as chairman of the National Committee to Defeat the Mundt Bill (NCDMB), the sponsors of which, Representatives Karl E. Mundt and Richard M. Nixon, had both been HUAC members. Their report focused on supposed ties between O'Connell, the Communist Party and the National Lawyers Guild, both of which supported the Progressive Party; O'Connell had been an important Progressive Party member in the state of Washington.

In 1955, he appeared before HUAC, which questioned him widely about possible communist ties, including his support of Henry A. Wallace's bid for president as a Progressive in 1948. O'Connell denied any affiliation with communists or communism, making use of his debating skills and training as an attorney to effectively counter the evidence presented against him. O'Connell was intentionally vague when answering questions about his role in the NCDMB. For instance, when asked whether he held any position in the organization, O'Connell at first said, "No," but then agreed that he had joined NCDMB in June 1948 and specified "probably September 13," 1950, as the end date for this affiliation. As a result of O'Connell's efforts during the hearing, the Committee gained no new evidence, which reduced its reputation for effectiveness.

== Death and burial ==
O'Connell died of a heart attack in Great Falls on January 16, 1956. He was buried at Hillcrest Lawn Memorial Mausoleum in Great Falls.

== Family ==
In 1931, O'Connell married Alvena Lois Smith of Townsend, Montana. After their divorce, in 1937 O'Connell married Mazie Elizabeth Richardson (1914–2005) of Great Falls. They were the parents of sons, Jerry D. (1949–2002) and Marshall (b. 1956). (Marshall O'Connell was born five months after his father's death.) Mazie O'Connell had pursued a show business career before her marriage. After the death of her husband, she worked in retail sales and management, and later owned and operated several Great Falls businesses, including bridal and formal wear stores. In 1984, Mrs. O'Connell married John D. Ross (d. 1990), a friend from high school.

== See also ==
- Mundt–Nixon Bill
- National Committee to Defeat the Mundt Bill

== Sources ==
=== Books ===
- United States Congress (1938). Official Congressional Directory. Washington, DC: US Government Printing Office.
- U.S. Congress (2005). Biographical Directory of the United States Congress, 1774–2005. Washington, DC: US Government Printing Office. ISBN 978-0-16-073176-1.
- U.S. House of Representatives, Subcommittee of the Committee on Un-American Activities (June 1, 1955). Investigation of Communist Activities in the Seattle, Wash. Area, Part 3. Washington, DC: US Government Printing Office.
- United States Senate (1949). Uniform Code of Military Justice: Hearings Before A Subcommittee of the Committee on Armed Services. Washington, DC: U.S. Government Printing Office – via Google Books.

=== Newspapers ===
- "Well–Known Pair Wed in Bozeman: Miss Alvena Smith Becomes Bride of Jerry O'Connell". Montana Standard. Butte, MT. October 4, 1931 – via Newspapers.com.
- "Amazing Matrimonial Ramblings of Jerry Revealed by Marriage". Independent Record. Helena, MT. January 3, 1937 – via Newspapers.com.
- "Five Are Admitted to Practice Law in Montana". Independent Record. Helena, MT. June 23, 1950 – via Newspapers.com.
- "O'Connell Linked with Red Party". Great Falls Tribune. Great Falls, MT. Associated Press. December 12, 1950 – via Newspapers.com.
- "O'Connell Says He Didn't Act for Reds". The Missoulian. Missoula, MT. Associated Press. June 2, 1955 – via Newspapers.com.
- "Jerry O'Connell, 46, State Lawyer and Former Congressman, Dies Here". Great Falls Tribune. Great Falls, MT. January 17, 1956 – via Newspapers.com.
- "Obituary, Mazie O'Connell Ross". Great Falls Tribune. Great Falls, MT. April 8, 2005 – via Newspapers.com.
- Pellett, Clem C. (October 5, 2014). "Catching a Montana killer". Great Falls Tribune.

=== Internet ===
- "Cemetery Index, Hillcrest Lawn, Great Falls, Montana". Cemetery Index for Cascade County, Montana. USGenWeb Archives. September 1, 1997. Archived from the original on January 30, 2018.
- "2010 OAH Annual Meeting" (PDF). Organization of American Historians. April 2010.
- Burnett, Lucy Marie. "Pacific Northwest Labor School: Educating Seattle's Labor Left". University of Washington.
- Pedersen, Vernon (April 8, 2010). "Terminal Hearing: The House Committee on Un‑American Activities and the Death of Jerry J. O'Connell". C-SPAN.
- "Karl Mundt Archives: Justice 1950–1972". Karl E. Mundt Historical & Educational Foundation and Archives. 2018. Archived from the original on May 10, 2017.

== External sources ==
- Media related to Jerry J. O'Connell at Wikimedia Commons
- govtrack.us: Rep. Jerry O'Connell
- The Political Graveyard: O'Connell, Jerry Joseph (1909–1956)
- Jerry J. O'Connell at Find a Grave
- United States Congress. "Jerry J. O'Connell (id: O000024)". Biographical Directory of the United States Congress.

U.S. House of Representatives
Preceded by Joseph P. Monaghan	Member of the U.S. House of Representatives from Montana's 1st congressional district January 3, 1937 – January 3, 1939	Succeeded by Jacob Thorkelson
