= Peter Campbell Brown =

American lawyer

- Peter Campbell Brown, center, with JFK watching
- Born: August 12, 1913; Brooklyn, New York, U.S.
- Died: July 23, 1994 (aged 80); Port Chester, New York, U.S.
- Occupations: Lawyer, Justice Department official

Peter Campbell Brown (12 August 1913 – 23 July 1994) was a corporation counsel for New York City and a Justice Department official.

== Early life ==
Brown was born in Brooklyn, New York, to Peter Paul Brown and Ellen Campbell, and grew up in Bay Ridge. He received an A.B. from Fordham University in 1935 and LL.B. from Fordham in 1938. In 1951, he received a doctorate in law from St. Bonaventure University.

== Career ==
After graduating from Fordham in 1938, Brown practiced law in Brooklyn until 1941. As an Army officer in World War II, he fought in the Battle of the Bulge and formed a close friendship with Robert F. Wagner Jr., who later became godfather to one of his children. In 1946, Brown was an assistant United States attorney for the Eastern District of New York. He was first assistant in the criminal division of the Department of Justice in 1947-1948, and special assistant to the United States Attorney General in 1949-1950. In 1950, he was appointed to the Subversive Activities Control Board by President Harry S. Truman. He was the Board's chairman in 1952 and 1953.

After resigning from the Subversive Activities Control Board, Brown joined the administration of New York City mayor Robert F. Wagner Jr. as Commissioner of Investigations in 1954-1955. He was appointed corporation counsel in 1955 and held that post until 1958. Brown returned to the private sector in 1958, practicing civil, criminal and corporate law in New York City. In 1978, he began practicing on his own. Over the years, his clients included Vince Lombardi, Sugar Ray Robinson and other sports figures.

== Person life ==
Brown was married to Joan Gallagher for 51 years. They had five children.
