= Communist Party v. Subversive Activities Control Board =

- Supreme Court of the United States

Argued November 17, 1955 Decided April 30, 1956
- Full case name: Communist Party of the United States v. Subversive Activities Control Board
- Citations: 351 U.S. 115 (more) 76 S.Ct. 663; 100 L. Ed. 1003

Court membership
- Chief Justice Earl Warren Associate Justices Hugo Black · Stanley F. Reed; Felix Frankfurter · William O. Douglas; Harold H. Burton · Tom C. Clark; Sherman Minton · John M. Harlan II

Case opinions
- Majority: Frankfurter, joined by Warren, Black, Douglas, Burton, Harlan
- Dissent: Clark, joined by Reed, Minton

Communist Party of the United States v. Subversive Activities Control Board, 351 U.S. 115 (1956) and 367 U.S. 1 (1961), was a federal court case in the United States involving the compelled registration of the Communist Party of the United States, under a statute requiring that all organizations determined to be directed or controlled by the "world Communist movement" publicly disclose detailed information as to their officers, funds, and membership.

The case resulted in two opinions from the Supreme Court of the United States, the second of which upheld the constitutionality of the registration requirement against challenges brought under the First and Fifth Amendments.

== Background ==
In 1950, the United States Congress passed the Subversive Activities Control Act of 1950. Its findings read, in part:

There exists a world Communist movement which, in its origins, its development, and its present practice, is a world-wide revolutionary movement whose purpose it is, by treachery, deceit, infiltration into other groups (governmental and otherwise), espionage, sabotage, terrorism, and any other means deemed necessary, to establish a Communist totalitarian dictatorship in the countries throughout the world through the medium of a world-wide Communist organization.

The Act required any organization qualifying as either a "communist-action" organization or a "communist-front" organization to register with the Attorney General of the United States and provided detailed information about their operations, including offices, finances, printing presses, names and addresses of officers, and in the case of "communist-action" organizations—those determined to be "substantially directed, dominated, or controlled by the foreign government or foreign organization controlling the world Communist movement...and...[that] operates primarily to advance the objectives of such world Communist movement—names and addresses of members. This registry was to be updated annually by the organization, kept available to the public by the Attorney General, and be the basis for an annual report by the Attorney General to Congress.

The Act also established the Subversive Activities Control Board, and empowered the Attorney General of the United States to petition the Board for an order that an organization register that was required to but had not done so. The Board was empowered to examine evidence, and to compel witnesses to appear before it and testify or produce documents. Review of the Board's determinations were to be reviewed in the Court of Appeals for the District of Columbia.

== Board and lower court proceedings ==
On November 22, 1950, the Attorney General petitioned the Subversive Activities Control Board for an order to require that the Communist Party of the United States register as a Communist-action organization. The Party filed suit in the United States District Court for the District of Columbia, and though a three-judge panel denied a preliminary injunction, it issued a stay of Board proceedings pending appeal. After the Supreme Court denied a petition for extension of the stay, the Party abandoned its lawsuit.

The Board conducted hearings regarding the Party from April 23, 1951 through July 1, 1952. After hearing testimony from twenty-two witnesses for the Attorney General and three for the Party, and reviewing 507 exhibits, the Board issued a 137-page report finding the Party was a "Communist-action" and ordering that it register.

On appeal, the Court of Appeals denied the Party's motion for leave to adduce additional evidence, which the Party had alleged would show that three witnesses for the Attorney General had committed perjury before the Board, and affirmed the Board's order.

== First Supreme Court decision ==
Though the Party challenged the constitutionality of the Act, the Supreme Court did not address these issues in its opinion, delivered by Justice Felix Frankfurter. The majority found that the Attorney General had failed to deny the perjury allegations. It concluded that because the testimony of the three witness was not insubstantial, the record had been impugned and therefore the Board's order could not stand. The Court remanded the case to the Board "to make certain that (it) bases its findings upon untainted evidence."

Three justices dissented in an opinion by Justice Tom C. Clark, criticizing the Court for employing a "pretext," in order to avoid deciding the core issues that were before it.

== Proceedings on remand ==
On remand, the Board denied several motions filed by the Party seeking to introduce additional evidence. The Court of Appeals also denied a motion by the party for leave to adduce additional evidence, but granted the Board permission to consider a motion by the Party regarding another of the Attorney General's witnesses who had also allegedly committed perjury. The Board granted the Party's motion, reopened the hearings, and the witness was recalled and crossexamined.

On December 18, 1956, the Board issued its 240-page Modified Report, finding that the recalled witness was credible but expunging the testimony of the other three challenged witnesses. Making new findings of fact, the Modified Report reaffirmed the Board's conclusion that the Party was a "Communist-action" organization and recommended that the Court of Appeals affirm its registration order. The Court of Appeals, however, remanded for the further production of documents regarding the recalled witness's testimony.

The hearings were reopened, further documents were produced, and the Board struck additional testimony though not to the extent that the Party requested. The Board then issued its Modified Report on Second Remand, with findings of fact largely consisting of the findings contained in its first Modified Report, and again concluding that the Communist Party of the United States was a Communist-action organization, and again recommending that its order to register be affirmed. The same panel of the Court of Appeals affirmed the order and denied the Party's motion for further discovery.

== Second Supreme Court decision ==
Communist Party v. Subversive Activities Control Board
- Supreme Court of the United States

Argued October 11–12, 1960 Decided June 5, 1961
- Full case name: Communist Party of the United States v. Subversive Activities Control Board
- Citations: 367 U.S. 1 (more) 81 S.Ct. 1357; 6 L. Ed. 2d 625

Court membership
- Chief Justice Earl Warren Associate Justices Hugo Black · Felix Frankfurter; William O. Douglas · Tom C. Clark; John M. Harlan II · William J. Brennan Jr. Charles E. Whittaker · Potter Stewart

Case opinions
- Majority: Frankfurter, joined by Clark, Harlan, Whittaker, Stewart
- Concur/dissent: Brennan, joined by Warren
- Dissent: Warren
- Dissent: Black
- Dissent: Douglas

Laws applied
- U.S. Const. amend. I

In an opinion again delivered by Justice Frankfurter, the Court upheld the constitutionality of the Act's registration requirements.

First, the Court rejected the argument that the Act was an unconstitutional bill of attainder. The registration requirement did not target organizations, but was predicated upon certain conduct. Second, the Court rejected the arguments that the registration requirement violated the rights of freedom of speech and freedom of association guaranteed by the First Amendment. Though noting that registration requirements may be invalidated on First Amendment grounds and had been by the Court in prior cases, the Court stated that the present case was different because of the seriousness of the threat that international Communism posed. The Court would not question Congress's findings regarding that threat, and would not reject its methods of dealing with it just because they might choose different methods.

Third, the Court deemed the Party's challenge under the Fifth Amendment protection against self-incrimination premature. The Party claimed that admitting to be an officer of the Party was recognized as incriminating, and that its officers would invoke the privilege, but the Court found this speculative and noted that its officers had been a matter of public record rather than a secret. Fourth and finally, the Court rejected the Party's due process challenge that Congress's findings of a "world Communist movement" predetermined facts that should be left for adjudication. The determination that a particular organization was required to register was left to be litigated, and "[t]hat is all due process requires."

Chief Justice Earl Warren and Justices Hugo Black and William O. Douglas each authored dissents, all of which each joined as well.
