= Jacob Thorkelson =

United States Congressman

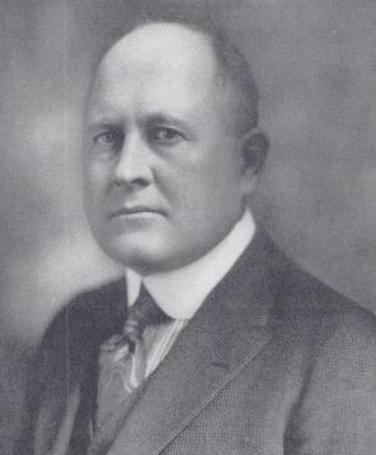

Member of the U.S. House of Representatives from Montana's 1st district
- In office January 3, 1939 – January 3, 1941
- Preceded by: Jerry J. O'Connell
- Succeeded by: Jeannette Rankin

Personal details
- Born: September 24, 1876 Egersund, Rogaland, Norway
- Died: November 20, 1945 (aged 69) Butte, Montana, U.S.
- Party: Republican
- Spouse: Charlotte F. Sullivan Thorkelson (1907–1997)
- Children: John Milton Thorkelson (1920–1988); Jacob Timothy Thorkelson (1940–1959)
- Education: University of Maryland, Baltimore

Jacob Thorkelson (September 24, 1876 – November 20, 1945) was a Norwegian-born American politician who served as the representative from Montana's 1st congressional district from January 3, 1939 to January 3, 1941.

== Biography ==
Thorkelson was born in Egersund, a coastal town in the county of Rogaland, Norway. Thorkelson immigrated to the United States in 1892; he studied nautical navigation, and later worked as navigator and sailing master on ocean-going ships. He graduated from the College of Physicians and Surgeons at the University of Maryland, Baltimore in 1911, and served as a member of the faculty from 1911 until 1913.

In 1913, Thorkelson moved to Montana. He practiced medicine while residing successively in Dillon, Warm Springs, and Butte.

== Military service ==
Thorkelson served with the Virginia Naval Reserve, a militia organization, from 1897 to 1899. He was also in the United States Navy Reserve from 1936 until 1939, and attained the rank of lieutenant commander.

== Political career ==
In 1938, he was elected to the United States House of Representatives from Montana's 1st congressional district as a Republican, defeating incumbent Democratic Congressman Jerry J. O'Connell in the general election. Thorkelson was labeled as "rabidly pro-fascist and antisemitic" and "Jew-baiting, fascist-minded" by contemporary journalists for his use of the Congressional Record to reprint anti-British and anti-Jewish propaganda and his support for retired General George Van Horn Moseley. Thorkelson was opposed to the United States accepting more Jewish refugees. He claimed that Jewish migrants were part of an "invisible government" which was tied to the "communistic Jew" and "Jewish international financiers."

Commentator Walter Winchell called Thorkelson "the mouthpiece of the Nazi movement in congress". Thorkelson later sued Winchell for $1.8 million after being included by Winchell as one of a list of "Americans We Can Do Without". During his time in Congress, Thorkelson mailed out 5,000 copies of a friendly, sympathetic interview with Adolf Hitler in collaboration with Nazi agent George Sylvester Viereck.

Modern historians have described Thorkelson as "best known for his diatribes against Jews and the New Deal and for his calls to revise the United States Constitution" and "a raging anti-Semite and pro-fascist". Thorkelson inserted into the Congressional Record quotations from the Protocols of the Elders of Zion, from World Hoax by Ernest Fredrick Elmhurst, from blackshirt Sir Oswald Mosley's Action, from Los Angeles based Nazi-leaning publication Christian Free Press; and defended himself by saying:

... words, "Nazi", "fascist", "anti-racial", "anti-Semitic"... were created by the anti-Americans as a cloak to shield their own subversive activities. ... their principles of organization are not destructive to the Government of The United States.

When he ran for re-election in 1940, he was defeated in the Republican primary by former United States Congresswoman Jeannette Rankin. Following his defeat, he ran for the United States Senate in 1942, but came third in the primary to Wellington D. Rankin and Charles R. Dawley. He sought the Republican nomination for Governor of Montana in 1944, challenging incumbent Governor Sam C. Ford in the primary, but lost to Ford by a landslide.

== Death and burial ==
Thorkelson died from heart ailments in Butte on November 20, 1945, and was buried at Holy Cross Cemetery in Butte.

U.S. House of Representatives
Preceded by Jerry J. O'Connell	Member of the U.S. House of Representatives from Montana's 1st congressional district January 3, 1939 – January 3, 1941	Succeeded by Jeannette Rankin
