= Public Opinion (Chambersburg, Pennsylvania) =

Newspaper

- Front page of the October 14, 2011 edition of Public Opinion
- Type: Daily newspaper
- Format: Broadsheet
- Owner: USA Today Co.
- Publisher: Ron Clausen
- Editor: Becky Bennett
- Founded: 1869 (as The Franklin Repository)
- Headquarters: 77 North Third Street; Chambersburg, Pennsylvania 17201; United States
- Circulation: 16,166 Daily; 17,768 Weekend
- Website: publicopiniononline.com

The Public Opinion is a morning newspaper that is published seven days per week. It is located in the Greater Chambersburg area and serves readers in Franklin, Cumberland and Fulton counties in the Commonwealth of Pennsylvania.

The newspaper also publishes a weekly total market coverage product, The Advertiser, and a monthly Faith magazine.

== History ==
Since 1869, when the first edition came off a flatbed press in a Main Street building in downtown Chambersburg, Public Opinion has been a part of life in the Cumberland Valley, and the county's most comprehensive source of local news and information.

Public Opinion began as a weekly newspaper and then became a daily that was initially published in the morning; in 1921, it became an afternoon paper. By 1931, the publishers of Public Opinion had bought two other newspapers with long histories in Franklin County, The Franklin Repository and Valley Spirit.

=== Corporate ownership ===
Founded by M.A. Foltz, Public Opinion remained in the Foltz family until 1964, when it was purchased by McClure Newspapers.

In 1971, Public Opinion became the twenty-seventh newspaper owned by Gannett, which publishes USA Today and the weekly newspaper magazine USA Weekend, will be replaced by Parade (magazine). The latter is an insert in Public Opinion on Saturdays.

Public Opinion again became a morning newspaper in 2005, the same year that MediaNews Group Inc. took over controlling ownership as the newspaper's majority partner of the Texas-New Mexico Newspaper Partnership.

MediaNews, headquartered in Denver, Colo., is one of the nation's largest newspaper companies. It publishes 54 daily newspapers in 11 states.

The MediaNews Group-Gannett partnership includes three other south central Pennsylvania newspapers: the York Daily Record and York Sunday News, Lebanon Daily News, and The Evening Sun of Hanover, and newspapers in El Paso, Texas and New Mexico. In the spring of 2015, however, it was anticipated that Gannett would again take control of some of MediaNews Group's holdings, including the Pennsylvania publications. Later in 2015, Gannett acquired full ownership of the Pennsylvania joint venture.

== Today ==
Public Opinion's current headquarters of the public opinion is at 5 N. Main St. in Chambersburg, PA. Its previous home at North Third and East King streets was built circa 1875 as a passenger station of the Cumberland Valley Railroad and served in that role until 1914. It was later used as a canteen for World War I soldiers passing through town and had a variety of manufacturing uses before 1956, when Public Opinion assumed occupancy.

In 2007, Public Opinion replaced its fifty-year-old letterpress with a Goss Urbanite offset press, and also introduced a Sunday edition.

Today, the newspaper is Franklin County's largest daily newspaper, with a circulation of about 16,200 Mondays through Fridays and 18,000 Saturday/Sunday "Weekend Edition".

== Awards ==
Public Opinion is the recipient of the 1967 Pulitzer Prize for Journalism for Local General or Spot News Reporting. Robert V. Cox won the award for his reporting of a mountain manhunt that ended with the killing of a deranged gunman who had terrorized the community. He also wrote the book Deadly Pursuit, which later was made into a television movie.
