= De Sylva v. Ballentine =

- Supreme Court of the United States

Argued April 25–26, 1956 Decided June 11, 1956
- Full case name: De Sylva v. Ballentine
- Citations: 351 U.S. 570 (more) 76 S. Ct. 974; 100 L. Ed. 1415; 109 U.S.P.Q. 431

Case history
- Prior: Ballentine v. DeSylva, 226 F.2d 623 (9th Cir. 1955); cert. granted, 350 U.S. 931 (1956).

Holding
- After the death of an author, the widow and children are eligible to renew copyright, equally as a class. Additionally, conditional on state laws, illegitimate children are also eligible for a share of the copyright.

Court membership
- Chief Justice Earl Warren Associate Justices Hugo Black · Stanley F. Reed; Felix Frankfurter · William O. Douglas; Harold H. Burton · Tom C. Clark; Sherman Minton · John M. Harlan II

Case opinions
- Majority: Harlan, joined by Warren, Reed, Frankfurter, Burton, Clark, Minton
- Concurrence: Douglas, joined by Black

De Sylva v. Ballentine, 351 U.S. 570 (1956), was a United States Supreme Court case in which the Court held after the death of an author, the widow and children are eligible to renew copyright, equally as a class. Additionally, conditional on state laws, illegitimate children are also eligible for a share of the copyright.

This extension to children and widows was not considered retroactive by courts, however. In Easton v. Universal Pictures Co., 288 N.Y.S. 2d 776 (1968), a 1951 document assigning control of a copyright from the author's family after his death was invalidated because "they had, in fact, as the law then appeared to be, nothing to assign." Another limitation to this new right of inheritance was that the family would not be eligible to renew the copyright if it had been passed permanently to another party, which was in line with Fred Fisher Music Co. v. M. Witmark & Sons.
