= Griffin v. Illinois =

- Supreme Court of the United States

Argued December 7, 1955 Decided April 23, 1956
- Full case name: Judson Griffin & James Crenshaw v. State of Illinois
- Citations: 351 U.S. 12 (more) 76 S. Ct. 585; 100 L. Ed. 2d 891
- Argument: Oral argument

Holding
- There is no distinction between a defendant's right to appeal versus a trial. Defendants cannot be denied an appeal because they cannot afford it.

Court membership
- Chief Justice Earl Warren Associate Justices Hugo Black · Stanley F. Reed; Felix Frankfurter · William O. Douglas; Harold H. Burton · Tom C. Clark; Sherman Minton · John M. Harlan II

Case opinions
- Plurality: Black, joined by Warren, Douglas, Clark
- Concurrence: Frankfurter
- Dissent: Burton, joined by Reed, Minton, Harlan
- Dissent: Harlan

Laws applied
- Fifth Amendment to the United States Constitution, Fourteenth Amendment to the United States Constitution

Griffin v. Illinois, 351 U.S. 12 (1956), was a case in which United States Supreme Court held that a criminal defendant may not be denied the right to appeal by inability to pay for a trial transcript.

== Background ==
=== Facts ===
The petitioners, Griffin and Crenshaw, were tried together and convicted of armed robbery in the Criminal Court of Cook County, Illinois.

=== Illinois law ===
Illinois law gave every person convicted in a criminal trial a right of review by writ of error, but it was necessary for the defendant to furnish the appellate court with a bill of exceptions or report of proceedings at the trial certified by the trial judge, and it was sometimes impossible to prepare such documents without a stenographic transcript of the trial proceedings, which are furnished free only to indigent defendants sentenced to death.

- Illinois law provided that "Writs of error in all criminal cases are writs of right and shall be issued of course." (Ill. Rev. Stat., 1955, c. 38, § 769.)
- Under a separate Illinois law, indigent defendants could obtain a free transcript to obtain appellate review of constitutional questions, but, except for capital cases, not of other alleged trial errors such as admissibility and sufficiency of evidence. (Ill. Rev. Stat., 1953, c. 110, § 259.70A (Supreme Court Rule 70A), now Ill. Rev. Stat., 1955, c. 110, § 101.65 (Supreme Court Rule 65).)

=== Trial court: motion ===
Petitioners filed a motion in the trial court asking that in view of their inability to pay, a certified copy of the record, necessary for a complete bill of exceptions as required by Illinois law for a full appellate review, was to be furnished them without cost. Immediately after their conviction, they filed a motion in the trial court, asking that a certified copy of the entire record, including a stenographic transcript of the proceedings, be furnished them without cost. They alleged that they were "poor persons with no means of paying the necessary fees to acquire the Transcript and Court Records needed to prosecute an appeal...." They alleged that they were without funds to pay for such documents and that failure of the court to provide them would violate the Due Process and Equal Protection Clauses of the Fourteenth Amendment.

The factual allegations were not denied; nevertheless, the trial court denied the motion without a hearing.

=== Trial court: petition ===
The defendants then filed a petition under the Illinois Post-Conviction Hearing Act (Ill. Rev. Stat. ch. 38 §§ 826–832), under which only questions arising under the State or Federal Constitution could be raised, to obtain a certified copy of the entire record for their appeal, alleging that there were manifest nonconstitutional errors in the trial that entitled them to have their convictions set aside on appeal, the only impediment to full appellate review was their lack of funds to buy a transcript, and refusal to afford full appellate review solely because of their poverty was a denial of due process and equal protection. The trial court dismissed their petition.

=== Supreme Court of Illinois ===
The Supreme Court of Illinois affirmed, solely on the ground that the petition raised no substantial state or federal constitutional question.

=== Certiorari and arguments ===
On certiorari, the prisoners contended that the failure to provide them with the needed transcript violated the Due Process and Equal Protection Clauses of the Fourteenth Amendment of the US Constitution.

The question presented was whether Illinois may, consistently with the Due Process and Equal Protection Clauses of the Fourteenth Amendment, administer the statute so as to deny adequate appellate review to the poor while granting such review to all others.

== Opinion of the court ==
=== Majority decision ===
The judgment was vacated and the cause remanded. Justice Hugo Black was joined by Justices Earl Warren, William O. Douglas and Tom C. Clark.

Black held that while the state court was not required by the federal constitution to provide appellate courts or a right to appellate review, because the state did grant appellate review at all stages of the proceedings, the Due Process and Equal Protection Clauses protected the prisoners from invidious discriminations. The court held that destitute defendants must be afforded as adequate appellate review as defendants who had enough money to buy the transcripts. It was held that the due process and equal protection clauses of the Fourteenth Amendment were violated by the state's denial of appellate review solely on account of a defendant's inability to pay for a transcript.

The court vacated and remanded the order from the state supreme court. The court held that petitioner prisoners had to be afforded as adequate appellate review as defendants with money to buy transcripts.

=== Concurrence ===
Justice Felix Frankfurter, while concurring in the judgment and apparently also agreeing with the substantive holding, expressed the view that the court should not indulge in the fiction that the new rule announced by it has always been the law, and therefore those who did not avail themselves of it in the past waived their rights.

== Dissenting opinions ==
=== Burton ===
Burton, with Minton, Reed, and Harlan, dissented, holding that the Federal Constitution does not invalidate state appellate proceedings merely because a required transcript has not been provided without cost to an indigent litigant upon his request.

=== Harlan ===
Harlan, in a separate dissenting opinion, also expressed the view that the constitutional question tendered by the defendants should not have been decided, because the record did not present it in that clean-cut, concrete, and unclouded form usually demanded for a decision of constitutional issues.

== See also ==
- List of United States Supreme Court cases, volume 351
