= Subversive Activities Control Board =

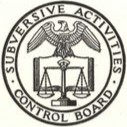
- Seal of the Subversive Activities Control Board

Board overview
- Formed: 1 November 1950
- Dissolved: 1972
- Jurisdiction: United States government
- Employees: 5

The Subversive Activities Control Board (SACB) was a United States federal committee. It was the subject of a landmark United States Supreme Court decision of the Warren Court, Communist Party v. Subversive Activities Control Board, 351 U.S. 115 (1956), that would lead to later decisions that rendered the Board powerless.

== History ==
The board was founded on November 1, 1950, pursuant to the McCarran Internal Security Act. The original 5 members of the panel were Seth W. Richardson of Washington, D.C., the Board's Chairman, along with Peter Campbell Brown of New York, Charles M. LaFollette of Indiana, David J. Coddaire of Massachusetts, and Dr. Kathryn McHale of Indiana. Mr. Brown later served as Chairman in 1952 and 1953.

The SACB was empowered to order the registration of organizations that it found to be "Communist fronts", "Communist action" groups or "Communist infiltrated" groups:

(e) It shall be the duty of the Board-

(1) upon application made by the Attorney General under section 13(a) of this title, or by any organization under section 13(b) of this title, to determine whether any organization is a Communist-action organization within the meaning of paragraph (3) of section 3 of this title, or a Communist-front organization within the meaning of paragraph (4) of section 3 of this title; and
(2) upon application made by the Attorney General under section 13(a) of this title, or by any individual under section 13(b) of this title, to determine whether any individual is a member of any Communist-action organization registered, or by final order of the Board required to be registered, under section 7(a) of this title.

In 1955, President Dwight D. Eisenhower appointed former Arkansas Governor Francis Cherry as SACB director. The appointment was continued by Presidents John F. Kennedy and Lyndon B. Johnson. However, the 1965 U.S. Supreme Court Albertson v. Subversive Activities Control Board case eliminated the SACB's authority to enforce Communist registration requirements.

The Subversive Activities Control Board was officially abolished by Congress in 1972.

== See also ==
- House Un-American Activities Committee
- Howard D. Abramowitz

== Archive ==
- LexisNexis: Archive
- United States Subversive Activities Control Board Records. 1953. 2 microfilm reels (1 negative, 1 positive). At the Labor Archives of Washington, University of Washington Libraries Special Collections.
