= Howard D. Abramowitz =

United States Army soldier and politician

Howard David Abramowitz (June 18, 1930 – April 9, 1990) was notable for his legal battles, along with co-defendant John Henry Harmon III, contesting an undesirable discharge from the Enlisted Reserve in Harmon v. Brucker. In 1951 he was drafted and sent to service in the Korean War. After serving two years he was given a certificate of honorable separation and, as required by U.S. law, entered the Enlisted Reserve. Two years later, the U.S. Army concluded that he was a security risk due to activity in left-wing politics and to his membership in the Communist Party USA. In 1958 the U.S. Supreme Court ruled that soldiers' discharges must be based solely on their military service records. Afterwards the Army upgraded Abramowitz's discharge to honorable. The ruling also led to reviewing the discharges of 720 other former soldiers. Abramowitz earned a master's degree in economics from the New School of Social Research, and completed his Ph.D. at New York University. He worked for a brief time as a researcher for the International Ladies Garment Workers Union and at New York University's Institute of Industrial Relations. In 1964, he began teaching sociology at Skidmore College (Saratoga Springs, N.Y.), where he remained until his death.
