= Josiah W. Gitt =

American newspaper editor

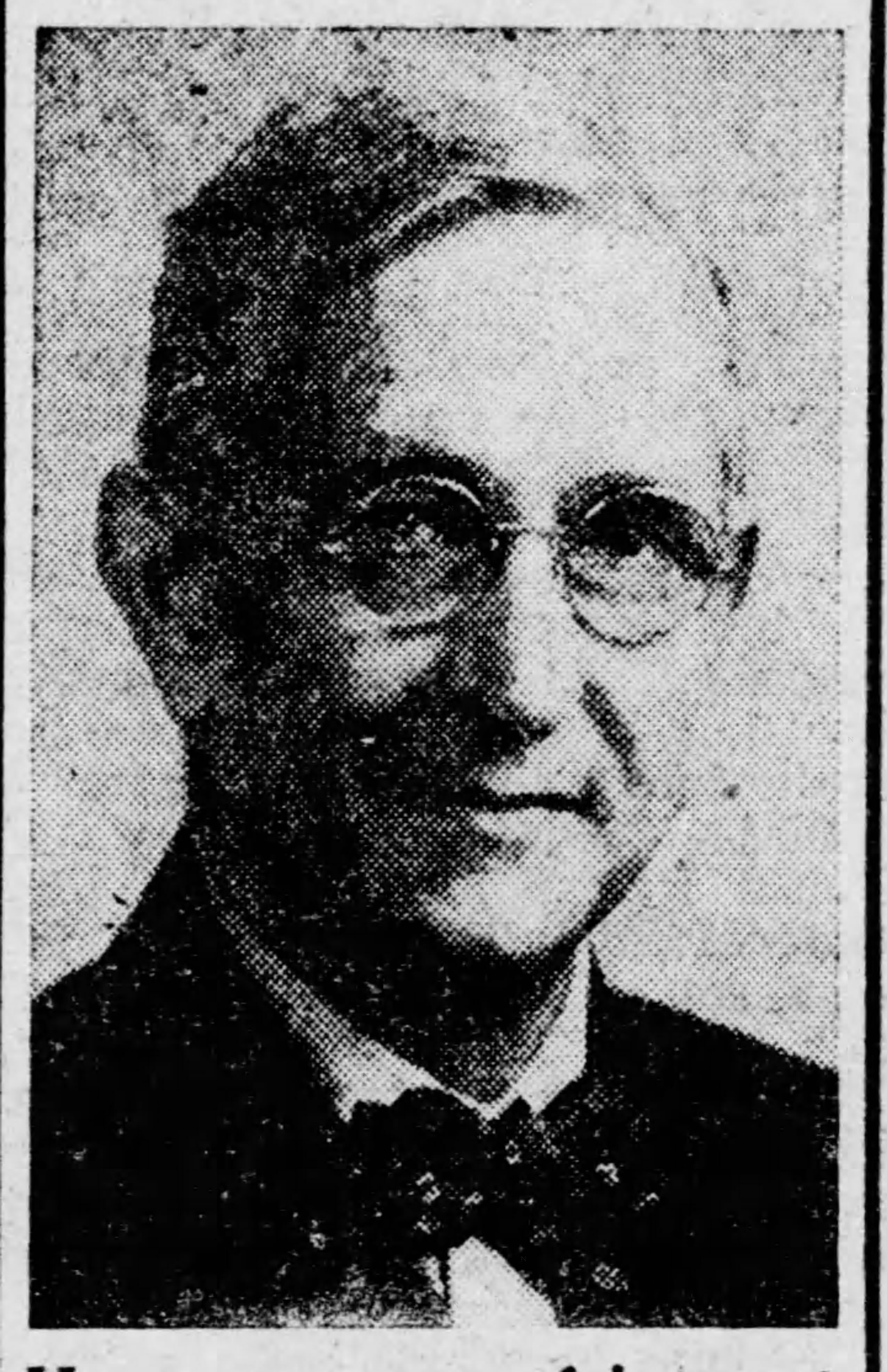

Josiah William Gitt (March 28, 1884 – October 7, 1973) was an American newspaper editor known for editing The York Gazette and Daily.

== Biography ==
Gitt was born in Hanover, New Hampshire, the son of Clinton Jacob Gitt and Emma Koplin. His maternal grandmother, Harriet Custer, was a cousin of George Armstrong Custer. Gitt graduated from Franklin & Marshall College and then studied at the University of Pittsburgh School of Law. Around 1917, Gitt purchased the Gazette and Daily after its former owners declared bankruptcy. Gitt was a Pennsylvania delegate to the 1928 Democratic National Convention in Houston, casting the state's sole vote for Samuel Huston Thompson. In 1944, he ran as the Democratic candidate for Congress from York County. He lost the election to Chester H. Gross.

Gitt served as the Pennsylvania state chairman of the Progressive Party in 1948, turning the Gazette into the only daily newspaper in Pennsylvania to support Henry Wallace. Gitt was one of the three references in 1948 on Wallace's Standard Form 57, his application to work as a federal employee. Under his editorship, the newspaper was likely "the only daily paper in the United States that consistently opposed postwar American foreign policy." It also published articles by progressive and leftist writers such as Howard Fast, who were rejected by more mainstream papers. Nevertheless, Gitt rejected accusations that he was a Communist or radical, telling an interviewer "I believe in progressive capitalism. I am not a materialist and in no sense am I a Marxist." Gitt and Louis Adamic warned Henry Wallace that they thought the Communist Party was attempting to embarrass the Party's non-Communist supporters into abandoning it, allowing the Communists to control the organization.

Gitt continued his paper's support of liberal causes after the defeat of Henry Wallace in 1948. In 1961 he was one of 400 names on an advertisement in the New York Times, calling for the abolition of the House Un-American Activities Committee. He also refused to accept advertising or editorials in support of Barry Goldwater during the 1964 election. He sold the Gazette in 1970 and its new owners changed the name to the York Daily Record. This followed several years of declining readership and a failed attempt by Gitt to implement a 10% pay cut for the newspaper's employees that led to a strike by the International Typographical Union Local.
