= Angel Food Ministries =

U.S. nonprofit organization closed due to fraud

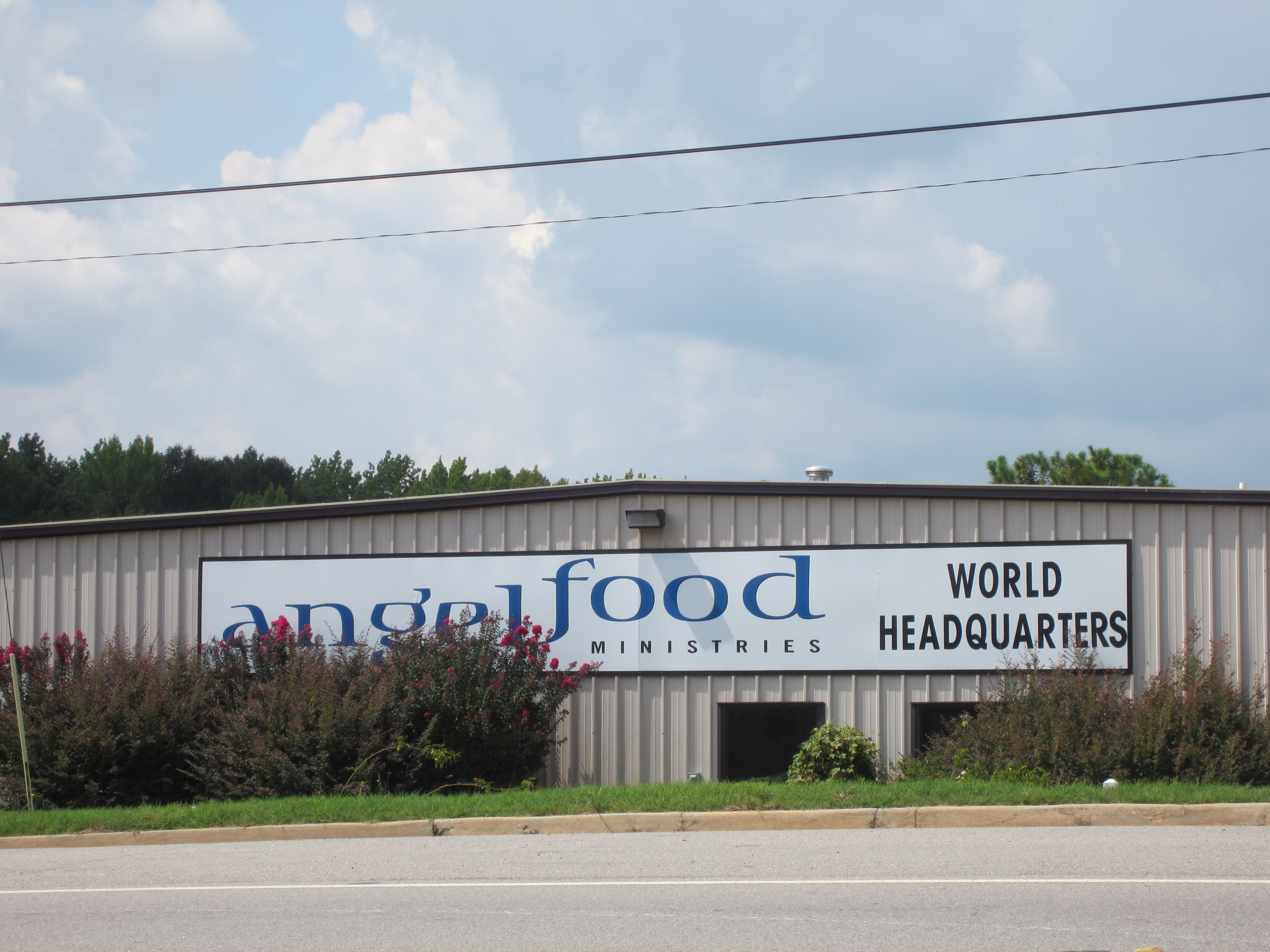
- The former headquarters of Angel Food Ministries in Monroe, Georgia
- Formation: 1994
- Founder: Joe and Linda Wingo
- Founded at: Monroe, Georgia
- Dissolved: September 2011; 14 years ago

Angel Food Ministries was a Monroe, Georgia, based nonprofit organization that provided a monthly food service to over 500,000 families. The ministry was a nondenominational program located in 43 states across the United States and the District of Columbia, distributing food from 5,200 locations. There were 473 distribution centers in Georgia and more than 1,400 concentrated in Texas, Missouri, Tennessee, and Pennsylvania. The headquarters was located in a 16,000-square-foot (1,500 m^{2}) warehouse in Monroe. The ministry employed 220 full-time employees and 500 temporary workers. The program bought food in bulk at discount price and then sold it in family sized quantities, while spreading the word of Christ. The ministry delivered $120 million in direct food assistance to families and nourished over 22 million Americans. In 2005, the ministry received the largest USDA grant ever given to a faith-based organization. The ministry closed in September 2011 as a result of a federal fraud investigation.

== Founders ==
Joe and Linda Wingo founded Angel Food Ministries in 1994 in Monroe, Georgia. They started the half charity and half business to help 34 families struggling financially by dispensing 34 boxes off the back porch of his home when numerous industrial plants closed in their community. Joe Wingo was a pastor at a local church the Emmanuel Praise Center in Monroe.

== Boxes ==
Each month, Angel Food Ministries created a variety of different sized boxes of food for about half of what they would cost at a grocery store. The boxes could be ordered online or through the churches at which they were picked up once a month. The food items in the box changed from month to month with a wide variety of meat, vegetables, and fruits; each box could contain a pamphlet concerning the word of Christ. There were specialty boxes that could be ordered such as gluten free, specialty meats, after-school, fresh produce and prepackaged heat and serve meals. Each box contained enough food to last a family of four for about a week and a senior citizen about a month. The signature boxes ranged from thirty one dollars to fifty one dollars as of March 2011. The boxes could also be purchased with food stamps, as a result of a partnership between Angel Food Ministries and the United States Department of Agriculture (USDA). There was no set amount on how many boxes that can be ordered, nor was it based on income. There were no applications or qualifications needed to be able to purchase a box.

== Programs ==
No Child Goes Without Project was a program created to feed about 1,700 children for a month through food boxes. Each box of food cost $24 and could be donated online or through churches that sponsor the program. The boxes were distributed to twelve low-income schools. This was a first for distributing food to school for Angel Food Ministries.

As a holiday program, people could buy a Thanksgiving or Christmas box that was provided for free to the families of people who serving overseas, or armed service members readjusting to life. The boxes were provided by people who buy a box of food designated for a family of a U.S. service man or woman serving today. The organization extended the benefit to non-military families.

In 2005, the ministry received a $6.9 million loan from the USDA, allowing it to expand significantly. This was the largest government loan ever given to a faith-based initiative, and administered by the White House Office of Faith-Based and Neighborhood Partnerships.

At the peak of the oil spill crisis in the Gulf of Mexico, Angel Food fed 40,000 people in Pensacola, Florida, for free on one day.

== Lawsuit and federal charges ==
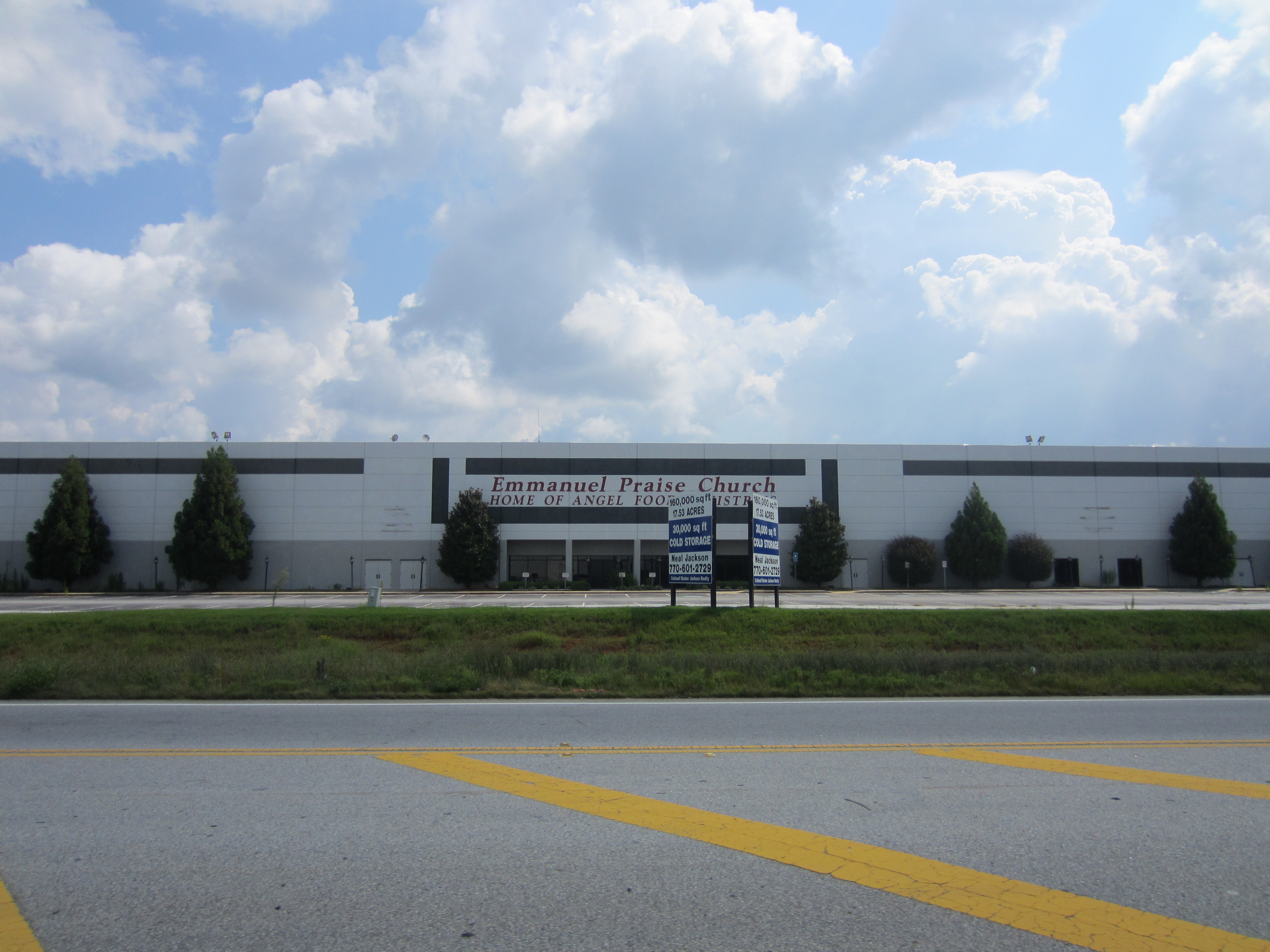
Former cold storage facility of Angel Food Ministries in Monroe, Georgia.

In 2006, the ministry reported revenue of $96 million and $17 million in expenses. Tax records from that year show the Wingos and two of their sons earned a combined total in excess of $2.1 million for leading the ministry, up from just less than a combined $323,000 a year earlier. Their combined salaries dipped to $501,472 in 2007, records showed.

A lawsuit filed February 2009 in a Georgia Superior Court in Walton County, alleged that the Wingos used the nonprofit organization to enrich themselves from food vendors and by rerouting money to themselves through their church, Emmanuel Praise Center. Craig Atnip and David Prather, two Angel Food Ministry board members filed the suit against the Wingos, and the suit asked a judge to bar Joe and Linda Wingo and their two sons from the property of the organization and to protect the assets of the ministry. The suit alleged that the Wingos enriched themselves by at least $2.7 million, which includes $600,000, which was allegedly given to the Wingos for a "housing allowance," directed from Angel Food Ministry to their church. The lawsuit also claimed that the food buyer for Angel Food Ministry, Andy Wingo, habitually took kickbacks as part of transactions with food vendors and that at least one family member knew about it. The suit also alleged that Joe Wingo set up a North Carolina corporation to buy a personal jet and then leased the jet to Angel Food Ministries for a profit of $10,000 a month. The suit additionally alleged the Wingos used the Angel Food credit cards and spent more than $850,000 for personal possessions. Angel Food Ministries offered its full cooperation in the investigation and voluntarily agreed to provide any records the government wished to examine.

The two board members who sued the nonprofit and the Wingos came to an agreement in Walton County, Georgia, Superior Court. Under the agreement approved by the court, the Wingos' company credit cards were to be canceled, the nonprofit was to undergo a forensic financial audit, and Joe Wingo was to sign over to Angel Food a company he owns that was renting the corporate jet to the nonprofit organization. The two board members who filed the suit agreed to leave the organization as a part of the deal and Angel Food was ordered to $45,000 in Atnip's and Prather's legal fees. They were able to retain standing to take any actions when the forensic audit came in. Joe Wingo and his son Wesley retained their roles at the agency. During the hearing, attorneys said Linda Wingo left her position the previous year and son Andy left in late 2007. In their June settlement, both sides agreed the audit would be kept under seal of the court.

Angel Food's February 1 filing also claimed that the defendants had complied with all other provisions of the June 19 court order, which was modified slightly on October 1.

Angel Food, the filing said, had eliminated all personal use of Angel Food credit cards by the Wingos; arranged for Angel Food to lease an airplane owned by North Carolina Aviation Leasing from under supervision of the Angel Food board, with no personal use allowed; paid Atnip $282,693 and continues to pay him $13,461.54 twice a month; and paid plaintiffs' counsel $45,000.

=== Fraud charges ===
In December 2011, the Wingo family and two others were issued a federal indictment for 49 counts of fraud. On August 29, 2013, Wesley and Andrew Wingo were sentenced to seven years in federal detention for money laundering and conspiracy charges. Linda Wingo was sentenced to five years probation, while Ministries employee Harry Michaels previously pleaded guilty to conspiracy to commit wire fraud.

== Similar groups ==
Low-cost food boxes are available in the Atlanta, Georgia, area through The Box Food Ministries. Similarly, a program is available in Kenosha, Wisconsin, through New Hope Ministries. In the nearby Kenosha community, boxes are available through the Self Help and Resource Exchange (SHARE) program.

The Ohio-based Smart Choice Food program offers food packages for sale in ten midwestern states, in almost an identical format to Angel Food Ministries, and using many of the former Angel Food Ministries host sites as outlets. The largest difference between Angel Food Ministries and Smart Choice Food is that the latter is organized as a for-profit business rather than a not-for-profit organization.

In November 2011, OneHarvest Food Ministries began serving communities throughout the Southeast region of the US. OneHarvest distributes in Alabama, Florida, Georgia, Mississippi, North Carolina, Oklahoma, South Carolina, Tennessee, Texas (Dallas/Fort Worth) and Virginia. OneHarvest was a non-profit, non-denominational, faith-based organization. By partnering with local churches, OneHarvest offered a once monthly distribution of low-cost prepaid food boxes. An EBT payment option was available at some distribution sites. OneHarvest is no longer operational.

== Reorganization ==
Angel Food Ministries posted on their website that they would not be distributing boxes in September 2011. They also mentioned restructuring or reorganizing the ministry citing economic hardships.

As of September 23, 2011, Angel food ministries shut down operations after 17 years of operation citing the economic difficulties expressed earlier in the month: "... At this time we regret to inform you that we have not found a solution that will allow Angel Food Ministries to continue to distribute food on a monthly basis and have decided to cease operations...."

Former employees and partners were unable to re-organize and have given up efforts.
