= Pedro del Valle =

United States Marine Corps general

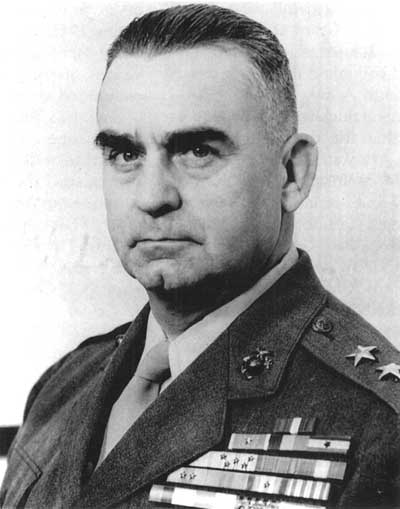
- Born: Pedro Augusto del Valle; August 28, 1893; San Juan, Puerto Rico
- Died: April 28, 1978 (aged 84) Annapolis, Maryland, U.S.
- Buried: United States Naval Academy Cemetery
- Allegiance: United States of America
- Branch: United States Marine Corps
- Service years: 1915–48
- Rank: Lieutenant general
- Commands: 11th Marine Regiment; III Amphibious Corps Artillery; 1st Marine Division
- Conflicts: Banana Wars: Occupation of Haiti; Occupation of Nicaragua; World War II: Battle of Guadalcanal; Battle of Guam; Battle of Okinawa
- Awards: See military awards

Pedro Augusto del Valle (August 28, 1893 – April 28, 1978) was a United States Marine Corps officer who became the first Hispanic to reach the rank of lieutenant general. His military career included service in World War I, the Banana Wars, and in World War II, the Battle of Guadalcanal and the Battle of Okinawa (Commanding General of the 1st Marine Division).

== Early years ==
Del Valle was born on August 28, 1893, in San Juan, Puerto Rico, when the island was still under Spanish colonial rule. His father was Dr. Pedro del Valle, who served as inspector general for the colonial government during the Spanish–American War. In 1900, two years after the war, the del Valle family moved to Maryland. His uncle, Dr. Francisco del Valle, a surgeon, stayed in Puerto Rico and served as Mayor of San Juan from 1907 to 1910. The del Valle family became U.S. citizens as a result of the Jones–Shafroth Act of 1917 which gave a United States Citizenship with limited rights to all the Puerto Ricans born on the island. He received his primary and secondary education in Maryland.

On June 17, 1911, after he graduated from high school, del Valle received an appointment by George Radcliffe Colton, who served from 1909 to 1913 as the U.S. appointed governor of Puerto Rico, to attend the U.S. Naval Academy in Annapolis, Maryland. He graduated from the academy in June 1915 and was commissioned a second lieutenant of the Marine Corps on June 5, 1915.

== Military career ==
Following the graduation, del Valle participated in the expeditionary duty in Santo Domingo, Dominican Republic, in 1916. Del Valle commanded the Marine detachment on board the USS Texas (BB-35) in the North Atlantic during World War I. In 1919, he participated in the surrender of the German High Seas Fleet. Later he served as "aide-de-camp" to Major General Joseph Henry Pendleton after serving on a tour of sea duty aboard the USS Wyoming (BB-32). His job included an inspection tour of the West Indies in the company of General Pendleton.

=== Banana Wars ===
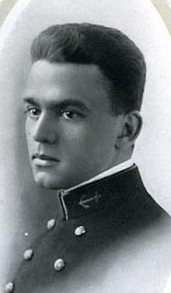
Pedro del Valle as a midshipman

In 1926, del Valle served with the Gendarmerie of Haiti for three years and, during that time, he also became active in the war against Augusto César Sandino in Nicaragua. In 1929, he returned to the United States and attended the Field Officers Course at the Marine Corps School in MCB Quantico, Virginia.

In 1931, Brigadier General Randolph C. Berkeley appointed del Valle to the "Landing Operations Text Board" in Quantico, the first organizational step taken by the Marines to develop a working doctrine for amphibious assault. In 1932, he wrote an essay titled "Ship-to-Shore in Amphibious Operations" which was published in the Marine Corps Gazette. In his essay, he stressed the importance of a coordinated amphibious assault and of an execution of an opposed landing.

He worked as an intelligence officer in Havana in 1933 under Admiral Charles Freeman, following the Cuban Sergeant's Revolt. From 1935 to 1937, del Valle was assistant naval attache, attached to the American Embassy to Italy in Rome. While on duty, del Valle participated as an observer with the Italian Forces during the Second Italo-Abyssinian War. The experiences which del Valle gained as an observer led him to author the book Roman Eagles Over Ethiopia where he describes the events leading up to the Italian expedition and the complete movements of combat operations by the Italian Army under Generals De Bono, Badoglio, and Graziani.

During the course of his service, De Valle revealed himself to be a fervent admirer of Benito Mussolini. He became a close friend of antisemitic propagandist James True and distributed "subversive" literature from George Deatherage’s Knights of the White Camellia and William Dudley Pelly's Silver Shirts. In 1939, he was ordered to attend the Army War College in Washington, D.C., and after graduating was named executive officer of the Division of Plans and Policies, USMC.

=== World War II ===
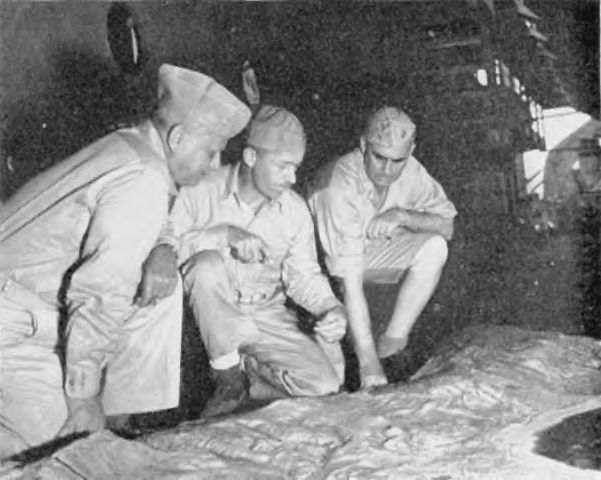
Major General Geiger (left), Colonel Silverthorn, and Brigadier General del Valle (right) examine a relief map of Guam on board the USS Appalachian

In March 1941, del Valle became the commanding officer of the 11th Marine Regiment (artillery). Upon the outbreak of World War II, del Valle led his regiment and participated in the Guadalcanal campaign, providing artillery support for the 1st Marine Division. In the Battle of the Tenaru, the firepower provided by del Valle's artillery units killed many assaulting Japanese soldiers before they ever reached the Marine positions. The attackers were killed almost to the last man. The outcome of the battle was so stunning that the Japanese commander, Colonel Kiyonao Ichiki, committed seppuku shortly afterwards. After the battle he was awarded the Legion of Merit.

Major General Alexander Vandegrift, impressed with del Valle's leadership recommended his promotion and on October 1, 1942, del Valle became a brigadier general. Vandegrift retained del Valle as head of the 11th Marines, the only time that the regiment has ever had a general as their commanding officer. In 1943, he served as Commander of Marine Forces overseeing Guadalcanal, Tulagi, and the Russell and Florida Islands.

On April 1, 1944, del Valle was the commanding general of the Third Corps Artillery, III Marine Amphibious Corps, which participated in the Battle of Guam. He was awarded a gold star in lieu of a second Legion of Merit. The men under his command did such a good job with their heavy artillery that no one man could be singled out for commendation. Instead, each man was given a letter of commendation by del Valle which was carried in their record books.

In late October 1944, he succeeded Major General William H. Rupertus as commanding general of the 1st Marine Division, being personally greeted in his new command by Colonel Lewis Burwell "Chesty" Puller. At the time, the 1st Marine Division was training on the island of Pavuvu for the invasion of Okinawa. He subsequently led the division throughout the campaign. Del Valle was awarded a Distinguished Service Medal for his leadership during the battle and the subsequent occupation and reorganization of Okinawa.

The "very surprising and unpatriotic utterances" del Valle had been making since 1941 led however to three separate investigations by the Federal Bureau of Investigation, the Office of Naval Intelligence and the War Office's Military Intelligence Department. Colonel Housewitz, an aide to Marine Corps General Clifton B. Cates, stated that although del Valle had formerly been "a very important figure in military circles", he was now "more or less an embarrassment to the Marine Corps as a result of his loudly voiced antisemitic statements."

=== Postwar ===
After World War II ended, del Valle was ordered back to Headquarters Marine Corps, where he was named Inspector General, a position which he held until he retired from the United States Marine Corps on January 1, 1948.

On February 19, 1946, New Mexico Senator Dennis Chavez and del Valle held a meeting with President Harry S. Truman in the White House, in which Chavez recommended del Valle for the position of governor of Puerto Rico. Local Puerto Rican politicians, such as Luis Muñoz Marín, opposed the naming of del Valle in favor of Jesús T. Piñero; to which del Valle eventually asked President Truman to withdraw his name among those considered for the position.

== Personal life and death ==
After retiring from the Marine Corps, del Valle worked as a representative of ITT in the company's office in Cairo. After some time with the company he was named president of ITT for all South America in Buenos Aires, a position that he held until 1951.

del Valle was married to Katharine Nelson (1890–1983). He died on April 28, 1978, in Annapolis, Maryland, and was buried at the United States Naval Academy Cemetery and Columbarium. In 2018, he was posthumously inducted to the Puerto Rico Veterans Hall of Fame.

=== Defenders of the American Constitution ===
In the early 1950s, believing that the United States was in danger of a communist threat, del Valle tried to convince the Central Intelligence Agency and Department of Defense to form a vigilante minuteman group. He also believed that the CIA should operate behind Russian and Chinese lines. After his ideas were turned down, he decided to form his own group.

On July 24, 1953, del Valle met with Colonel John H. Coffman, Colonel Eugene Cowles Pomeroy, Brigadier General Bonner Fellers, and Major General Claire Chennault to form the Defenders of the American Constitution (DAC). The DAC believed in a "one-worldist conspiracy" led by New York Jewish financiers who controlled international communism, and described their goal as the defense of "the US constitution against enemies and encroachments, both foreign and domestic." The idea behind the group was to organize the citizens in each state as vigilantes against sabotage and other forms of treason, then link them up in some national headquarters.

The DAC had close ideological and organizational ties with British far-right groups, including the League of Empire Loyalists (with which it campaigned for the dismissal of Ezra Pound from St. Elizabeths Hospital). In the DAC's official magazine Task Force, del Valle expressed considerable admiration for the work of the British fascist Peter Huxley-Blythe, calling Huxley-Blythe's 1955 book Betrayal an "excellent work", a "courageous work" and "a tremendous contribution". Task Force combined its August and September editions of 1956 in order to reprint Betrayal, calling it "one of the most important articles it has ever been a privilege to publish".

After del Valle's death at age 85, the DAC ceased to exist. The American scholar William C. Baum wrote that del Valle displayed all of the signs of a deeply paranoid personality, leading him to conclude that del Valle was "not part of an authentic conservative tradition of thought in America" as he expressed "...abnormal amounts of anger and frustration" in his writings and he had "more in common with the character of General Jack D. Ripper in the memorable film Dr. Strangelove than with those with a considered commitment to the tenets of modern conservative thought".

== Publications ==
- Diary and reports of the U.S. naval observer of Italian Operations in East Africa: March 1937, 1937
- Roman Eagles Over Ethiopia, 1940
- Guam, the Classical Amphibious Operation, 1944
- Massed Fires on Guam, 1944
- Semper fidelis: An autobiography, 1976

== Military awards ==
Lieutenant General Pedro del Valle's decorations and awards include:

| 1st row | Navy Distinguished Service Medal | Legion of Merit with Gold Star | Navy and Marine Corps Medal | Combat Action Ribbon |
| 2nd row | Navy Presidential Unit Citation with Bronze Star | Marine Corps Expeditionary Medal with Bronze Star | Dominican Campaign Medal | World War I Victory Medal with Bronze star |
| 3rd row | Haitian Campaign Medal | Nicaraguan Campaign Medal | American Defense Service Medal | American Campaign Medal |
| 4th row | Asiatic-Pacific Campaign Medal with Silver Star | World War II Victory Medal | Order of the Crown of Italy | Italian East African Medal |
| 5th row | Colonial Order of the Star of Italy | Italian Bronze Medal of Military Valor | Cuban Order of Naval Merit; 2nd class | Ecuadorian Order of Abdon Calderón; 1st class with Diploma |

== See also ==
- List of Puerto Ricans
- List of Puerto Rican military personnel
- Puerto Ricans in World War I
- Puerto Ricans in World War II
- List of historically notable United States Marines
- Hispanics in the United States Marine Corps
- Hispanics in the United States Naval Academy

Military offices
| Preceded by William H. Rupertus | Commanding General of the 1st Marine Division; 2 November 1944 – 8 August 1945 | Succeeded by Dewitt Peck |
