= James True =

James Benjamin True Jr. (July 1, 1880 – September 26, 1946) was an American far-right activist and conspiracy theorist, notable for his antisemitism and sympathies for Nazi Germany.

== Early years ==
James Benjamin True Jr. was born on July 1, 1880, to James Benjamin Sr. and Sarah Crump True. James True Jr. married Florence (Florestine) Bernos in New Orleans in 1905. He worked for the New Orleans Item as a writer and reporter until, exhausted from overwork, he moved with his wife and three children to Long Beach, Mississippi, in 1911. There he supported his family by writing short stories. He deserted his wife and five children at the end of 1918. He worked for the Chicago Tribune from 1917 to 1919.

== Activist ==
In the early 1930s, following the trials of the Scottsboro case, James True Associates, founded in July 1933, was one of a number of voices that identified Jews with a plan to subvert American society and overthrow the U.S. government using African Americans as "the shock troops of the revolution".

True and his newsletter, Industrial Control Reports, which charged $12 for an annual subscription, came to the attention of the FDR administration after just a few months. In October 1933, General Hugh S. Johnson, head of the National Recovery Administration (NRA), one of the earliest and most critical programs of the New Deal, notified True that he was no longer welcome at his press conferences. He wrote: "Your last industrial control report is full of misinformation and sabotage of NRA. I encourage constructive criticism but your statements have been consistently without foundation in fact and in one case distinctly libelous." True replied that he had twenty years of experience reporting and planned to continue attending. (Note: It was customary at this period for an official holding a press conference to determine who was welcome.) True was ejected when he tried to attend Johnson's next conference. In covering the dispute, the Chicago Tribune described Industrial Control Reports as "a weekly business gossip letter". True failed to win support from the trade reporters committee, which ruled he was no longer eligible to be a member of their group.

True originated the use of the term America First as a label for isolationists, later made famous on the eve of World War II by the America First Committee. On September 17, 1934, True, identifying himself as president of American First, Inc., called on FDR to dismiss all government officials who "opposed to our democratic system of government". He said: "Obviously following the theories of Karl Marx, your administrators and advisers have based their plans on the Soviet Russian system of regimentation and collectivism". He named as suitable candidates for dismissal Interior Secretary Harold Ickes and Labor Secretary Frances Perkins, the U.S. Ambassadors to Germany and Russia, William Dodd and William Bullitt, and more than a dozen others.

In February 1938, True offered to supply weapons to a fascist uprising plotted by George E. Deatherage, that was scheduled to take place after the 1940 elections. In a letter to conspirator Henry Allen, True wrote, "If your friends want some peashooters [rifles], I have connections now for any quantity at the right price." At the bottom of the typed letter, True added a handwritten sentence: "But be very careful about controlling this information and destroy this letter." True expressed his admiration for the book burnings in Austria after the Anschluss, because "filthy books have been published by the hundreds, under the guise of science or 'liberalism' for the debauchery of youth. Quite naturally, the first move of the Aryans was to destroy this mental poison. Soon, we predict, we shall have similar book burnings in this country."

In November 1938, the Dies Committee of the U.S. House of Representatives identified True as a distributor of antisemitic propaganda in the United States. In testimony before that committee in May 1939, George Deatherage, head of the white supremacist Knights of the White Camellia, reported that True had patented a weapon for street-fighting against Jews, which the New York Times described as "a sort of baton about three feet long with knobs and notches in it". True lobbied Congress routinely and supported a variety of right-wing figures. On May 31, 1939, when General George Moseley testified before the Dies committee and called on President Roosevelt to remove all communists from government and use the army to put down an imminent Communist revolution in the United States, James True's presence in the audience was noted along with that of Donald Shea of the American Gentile League.

As FDR made plans to seek an unprecedented third-term as president in 1940, True, according to later court testimony, wrote that he was receiving increasing requests for information about the president's "Jewish ancestry", which he thought would frustrate FDR's plans.

== Sedition trial ==
True was indicted for sedition along with 27 others on July 23, 1942. The charge was conspiring to impair the morale of the armed forces. He was identified as "James C. True [sic] of Arlington, Va., and Washington, publisher of Industrial Control Reports and organizer of James True Associates". Two years later True was among a group of 30 indicted and charged with participation in a Nazi plot to incite mutiny and revolution. When the trial opened in April 1944, True, aged 66, was described as an "elderly defendant" and after returning to his Arlington, Virginia, home on the trial's seventh day he collapsed. His court-appointed attorney said he was "feeble" and "critical" and his wife says he was "weak as a rag".

The trial continued even while he was unable to attend, which his attorney later argued was grounds for a mistrial. Judge Edward C. Eicher severed True from rest of defendants, but the prosecution continued to present testimony that made him out to be part of the conspiracy. In August, True's landlady testified to hearing a True complain of someone's failure to assassinate the president, tell of plans for a revolution in New York, and give someone a weapon he said could "kill six Jews". The trial ended in a mistrial after eight months when Judge Eicher died of a heart attack in November 1944. As the government argued for a new trial over defense objections, True died and was buried in an unmarked grave in Oak Hill Cemetery in Washington, DC, on September 28, 1946.

== Writings ==
- Reporting the Truth about Recovery (Washington: James True Associates, 1934), 48 pp.
- Gold Manipulation and Depressions (Washington: James True Associates, 1938), 72 pp.: "depressions in the United States have been created and the stock market controlled through gold manipulations"
