= Christian Front (United States) =

20th century anti-Semitic political association

The Christian Front was a far-right antisemitic political association active in the United States from 1938 to 1940, started in response to radio priest Charles Coughlin. The Christian Front was mainly based in New York City and many of its members were Irish and German American Catholics. Their activities included distributing like-minded publications and participating in rallies. After the American government began investigations in the late 1930s, a few members were arrested and prosecuted. The trials of these members discredited the entire movement and by the end of 1940, the Christian Front was no longer active.

== History ==
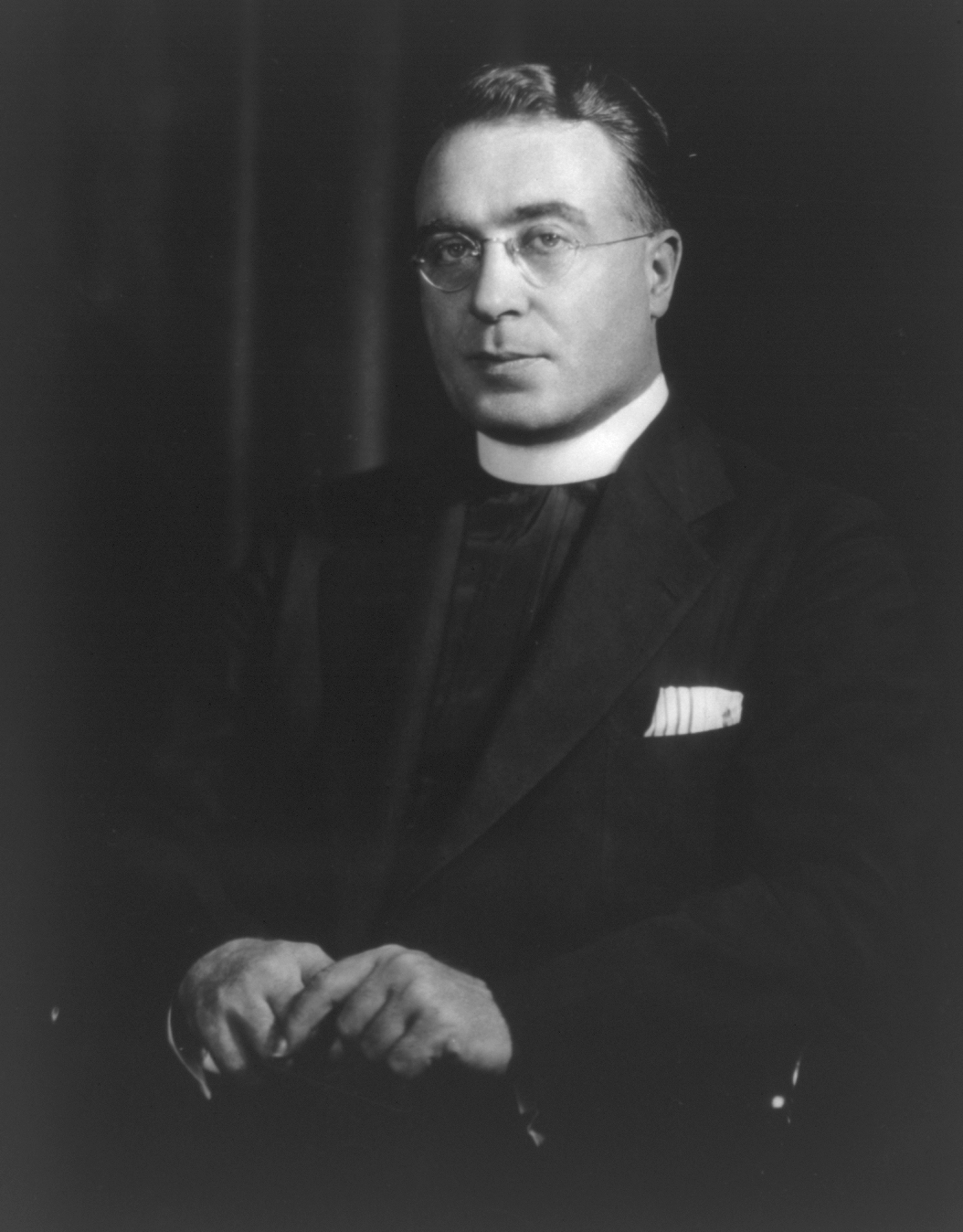
Father Charles Coughlin, whose antisemitic views inspired the Christian Front

The Christian Front was founded in November 1938 in response to the prompting of radio priest Charles Coughlin, who had called for a "crusade against the anti-Christian forces of the Red Revolution" in the May 23, 1938, edition of his newspaper, Social Justice. Its membership numbered several thousand and consisted mostly of Irish-Americans in New York City.

It was led by John F. Cassidy, a St. John's Law School graduate who had failed the bar exam three times and unsuccessfully applied to work at the FBI. He was personally selected by Charles Coughlin, who announced Cassidy's leadership by radio to six thousand of his most ardent followers, then in Social Justice on July 31. He was also known as the Little Fuhrer.

The Christian Front sold Social Justice, organized boycotts of Jewish businesses, and held parades and rallies. They made no distinction between "Reds" and Jews. Their rallies welcomed attendees from like-minded organizations like the German American Bund and Crusaders for Americanism. They heard speakers denounce Jews as international bankers, war mongers, and communists, mock President Roosevelt as Rosenfelt, and praise Franco and Hitler. The Roman Catholic Bishop of Brooklyn, Thomas Molloy, was a prominent supporter and his diocesan newspaper, the Tablet once addressed the charge that the Christian Front was antisemitic: "Well what of it? Just what law was violated?"

The Front also targeted organized labor and tried to replace union officials, deemed too radical or Jewish, with "Christian leadership".

Many National Guard members, and at least 400 NYPD officers, were members of the Christian Front.

The Christian Front participated in the February 20, 1939, Nazi rally held in Madison Square Garden organized by the German American Bund. According to James Wechsler, the Christian Front was the critical component in taking Coughlin's message into action. It was, he wrote, "the dynamic core of the movement. It calls the mass meetings, floods the city with leaflets, and rallies the crowds under its own signature." For several months in 1939, Jews were harassed and attacked on the streets of New York City by thugs generally associated with the Front. In his call for the creation of the organization, Coughlin urged members to emulate the violence of Francisco Franco. He cited Thomas Aquinas' theology—describing violent revolt as a justifiable response to tyranny—in his calls for violence. Christian Front members committed many beatings and stabbings. New York City police infiltrated the organization and obtained more than a hundred convictions for the assaults.

In September 1939, the editors of Equality magazine published a 15-page letter to Cardinal Francis Spellman of New York asking him to state his position on the Front and warning its activities might "culminate in a violent, bloody rioting such as the city has never known." It said the Front's members were 90 percent Catholics and warned that "continued silence on this extremely serious question ... will be interpreted as implicit sanction of the Christian Front in this city". Among those signing the letter were Franz Boas, Bennet Cerf, Moss Hart, Lillian Hellman, and Dorothy Parker. In November, the Brooklyn Church and Mission Federation, which represented almost every Protestant congregation in that borough, warned Protestants against the Front, calling it "evil and unchristian". Look magazine covered the violence in September and October, including photos. In December, after New York radio station WMCA announced it would no longer carry Coughlin's weekly sermons, Christian Front members organized protests every Sunday for weeks at the offices of the station, its advertisers, and Jewish-owned businesses.

They planned to throw bombs through the windows of the Cameo Theater, Jewish Daily Forward, and Daily Worker. Their hope was that this would incite riots by communists and Jewish people, so they would have justification to fight them in purported self-defense. The plot never came to fruition; several Christian Front members were arrested by the FBI a few months after the plan was formed. At the time of arrest, the implicated members had between them more than a dozen guns, ammunition, fifteen partially completed bombs, and other explosives.

A faction of the Christian Front that supported cooperation with the German American Bund and an escalation on the violence against Jews and Communists splintered in 1939. The splinter group—the Christian Mobilizers—was led by Joe McWilliams. Coughlin refused to accept donations from the members of the group. Meetings were held at the Guard Unit clubhouse, which McWilliams owned.

In 1939, McWilliams organized a 2000-person rally encouraging people to boycott Jewish businesses. It resulted in significant violence, the arrest of five attendees, and the hospitalization of one police officer. Another rally later that year had 15 thousand attendees, and took place at Innisfail Park in the Bronx. Members of the German American Bund, the primary Christian Front branch, and the American Nationalist Confederation were all present. George Moseley had been scheduled to speak, but did not because he was being investigated by the U.S. military. Instead, protesters heard from George Deatherage, founder of the Confederation.

=== Investigation by the government ===
At the urging of the U.S. attorney for New York, the U.S. Department of Justice decided to target the Front. On December 28, 1939, U.S. Attorney General Frank Murphy announced that a grand jury in Washington, D.C., would hear evidence of organized antisemitism and other activities that might be fomented by foreign agents. He promised to find ways to prosecute those involved using the tax code and whatever statutes might prove useful. In January 1940, federal agents arrested 17 men, all residents of Brooklyn and mostly Front members, and charged that they had conspired to "overthrow, put down and destroy by force the Government of the United States" and planned to steal weapons and ammunition to do so. The conspirators had planned to install retired Major General George Van Horn Moseley as a dictator after surrounding the White House with thousands of supporters from the police and National Guard. J. Edgar Hoover suggested there were collaborators in Boston and Philadelphia. Their cache of weapons included an old saber and an 1873 Springfield rifle.

The Catholic magazine Commonweal expressed sympathy for those arrested, saying in an editorial that Coughlin, The Tablet, and Social Justice were responsible for creating this group of "hypnotized men". Coughlin initially distanced himself from the organization and claimed to have repeatedly disavowed them. When he sensed that public opinion might be more favorable to the group than expected (those who were not in favor of the Christian Front's mission tended to describe them as badly-thought-out and harmless), he released a statement of support, calling the Front "pro-American, pro-Christian, anti-Communist and anti-Nazi".

The arrestees were indicted February 8, 1940, in Brooklyn, "on charges of seditious conspiracy and stealing Federal munitions and property." One of the accused, Claus Gunther Ernecke, a naturalized emigrant from Germany and a member of the German American Bund, went missing on April 13, 1940. The following day, the body of Ernecke, 35, was found hanging in his apartment. According to a witness at the trial, Ernecke was violently antisemitic, once declaring that he wanted to "eradicate the Jews." He said if the United States declared war on Germany, it would be a "Jewish war", and that he would return to Germany to "fight for Hitler." Healy also testified that Christian Front members were gathering weapons and waiting for the "Jewish revolution", after which they would launch a counter-revolution.

At the trial, visitors were banned from the courtroom unless issued a pass by the marshal. This was likely because the case's preliminary bail hearings had drawn hundreds of people, many of whom shouted statements of support for the defendants. In the early days of the trial, the area outside the courthouse was chaotic, with at least one fistfight. The lead foreman of the jury was married to the lead defense attorney—a conflict of interest that the prosecutors did not discover (or ignored) during the voir dire process. The trial lasted ten weeks.

One government official admitted off the record that the Front was really being prosecuted for un-Americanism. The charges did not mention antisemitism or Coughlin. For Macklin Boettger, John Viebrock, William Bishop, and Captain Prout, the trial resulted in a hung jury. The other thirteen defendants were acquitted. The federal government dropped its charges in 1941, at which point the new Attorney General, Robert Jackson, called the charges "a bit fantastic". One historian has called the trial an exercise in "public relations" that exaggerated the danger posed by "a pathetic bunch." Another said that "the trial revealed the Christian Fronters to be a group of unbalanced cranks and successfully discredited the entire movement."

According to historian Rev. Charles R. Gallagher, S.J., declassified FBI documents assert that the Brooklyn Christian Front members engaged in military training, sought to carry out a wide range of attacks, and were in possession of weaponry that included Browning automatic rifles. Local supporters in New York City demonstrated on their behalf after their trial. Some of the Christian Front weapons were likely stolen from the National Guard. When the FBI tried to investigate this, the sergeant at arms responsible for the weapons refused to speak to them, as did his superior.

In 1940, Francis Moran, who ran the Boston Christian Front, was recruited as a German agent by German consul Herbert Scholz. The Boston Christian Front office, located in the Copley Square Hotel, was shut down in 1942 thanks to the efforts of Frances Sweeney and with the help of the British; the Christian Front continued to operate clandestinely in the city until 1945.

== See also ==
- 1939 Nazi rally at Madison Square Garden
- Frances Sweeney, activist who waged a "one-woman crusade" against the Christian Front in Boston

== Additional reading ==
- Bayor, Ronald H. Neighbors in Conflict: The Irish, Germans, Jews, and Italians of New York City, 1929–1941 (University of Illinois Press, 1988)
- Theodore D., Irwin. "Inside the "Christian front."". UHM Library Digital Image Collections. American Council on Public Affairs.
- McCarthy, Edward C. The Christian Front Movement in New York City, 1938–1940 (1965)
- Gallagher, Charles R. (2021). Nazis of Copley Square : the forgotten story of the Christian Front. Cambridge, Massachusetts. ISBN 978-0-674-98371-7. OCLC 1235870475.
- Norwood, Stephen H. "Marauding Youth and the Christian Front: Antisemitic Violence in Boston and New York During World War II", American Jewish History, Vol. 91, No. 2, June 2003, pp. 233–67, JSTOR
