= Saint Joseph Preparatory High School =

Mount Saint Joseph Academy (Boston, Massachusetts)
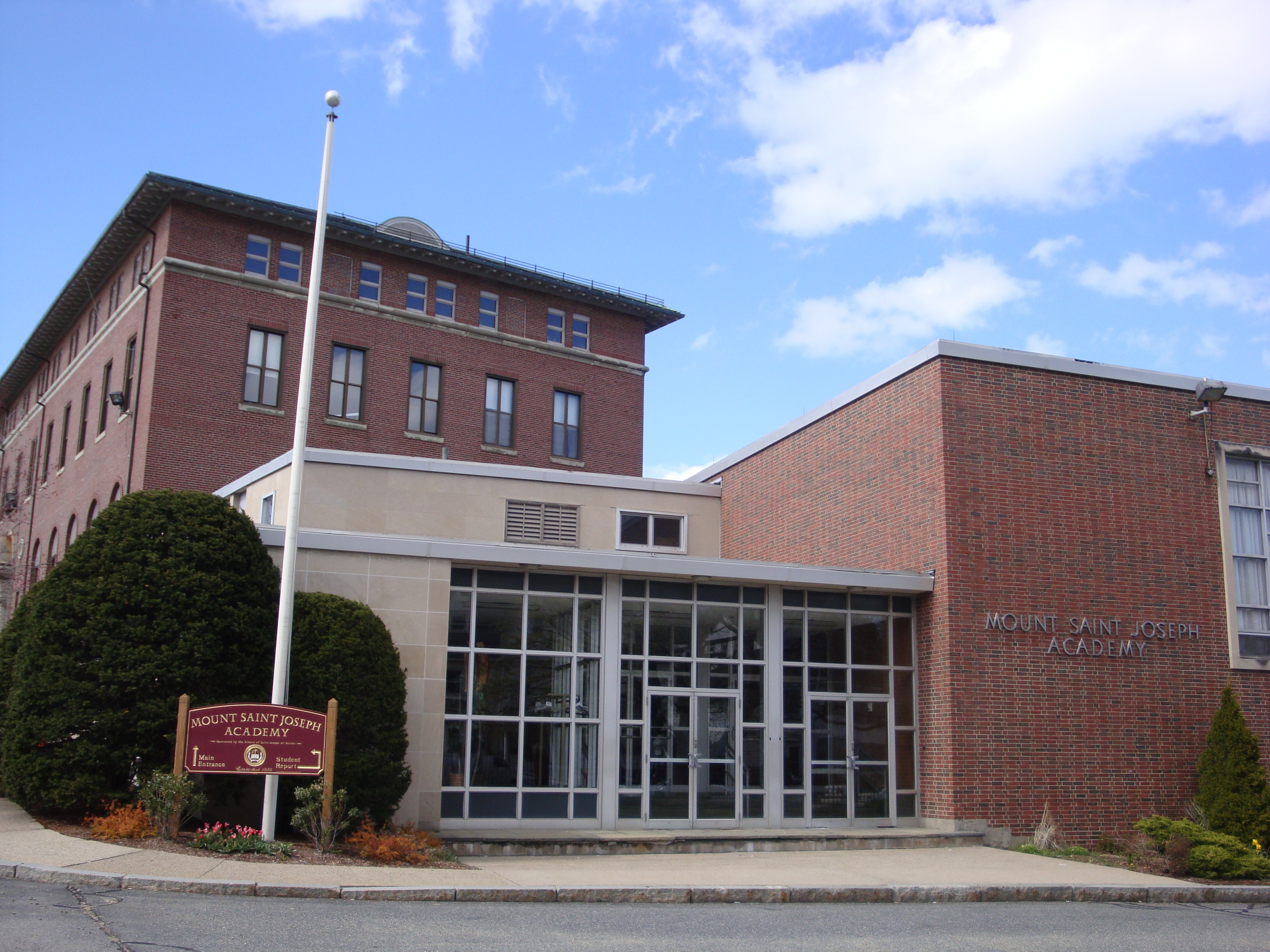
- Mount Saint Joseph Academy (Boston, Massachusetts)

Location
- 617 Cambridge Street; Brighton, Massachusetts 02134; United States
- Coordinates: 42°21′8″N 71°8′38″W

Information
- Type: Private
- Religious affiliation: Roman Catholic
- Established: 2012
- Closed: 2023
- Head of school: Kathleen McCarvill and Eugene Ward
- Grades: 9–12
- Gender: Coeducational
- Average class size: 18
- Colors: Maroon and Navy Blue
- Athletics conference: Catholic Conference
- Mascot: The Phoenix
- Team name: The Phoenix
- Accreditation: New England Association of Schools and Colleges
- Affiliation: Sisters of Saint Joseph of Boston
- Website: www.saintjosephprep.org

Saint Joseph Preparatory High School, formerly the Mount Saint Joseph Academy, was a Catholic college-preparatory high school founded in 2012 in Brighton, Boston, Massachusetts. Its opening followed the 2012 closings of Mount Saint Joseph Academy and Trinity Catholic High School. The school occupied Mount Saint Joseph Academy's former campus, and both institutions were named in honor of Saint Joseph.

Saint Joseph Prep was accredited by the New England Association of Secondary Schools and Colleges. In 2022, the school was ranked as the best Catholic high school in Massachusetts by Niche.com.

In February 2023, the school announced it would close at the end of the academic year.

== Notable alumni ==
- Maura Hennigan, former Boston City Councilor
- Frances Sweeney (1908-1944), anti-fascist activist and journalist
