= Lois de Lafayette Washburn =

American fascist (1893–1976)

- Born: April 5, 1893; United States
- Died: August 1976 (aged 83); United States

Lois de Lafayette Washburn (April 5, 1893 – 1976) was an American fascist and the founder of antisemitic groups in Chicago and Tacoma, Washington. She signed her letters "T.N.T."

== Early life ==
She claimed to be a descendant of General Lafayette, the French aide to George Washington.

== Political career ==
She founded antisemitic groups in Chicago and Tacoma, Washington. She also acted as the executive secretary of Donald Shea's National Gentile League.

In 1936 she founded the Crusaders for Economic Liberty in Chicago with George W. Christians. She also helped establish the American Gentile Protective Association of Chicago.

In a letter to a friend she observed that, "First it is necessary to drag these brigand Jews by the hair of the head … and place them before a firing squad, since death is the penalty for high treason. Then we will proceed to set up William Dudley Pelley's Christian Commonwealth".

While on trial with seditionists in 1944 during the Brown Scare, she gave a Nazi salute from the court steps. She appeared at one hearing in her nightie, claiming the jail guards had deliberately stolen her clothes. She made political statements and laughed at inappropriate moments.

== Selected publications ==
- "Yankee Minute Men" (pamphlet)
