= Copley Square Hotel =

Hotel in Boston, Massachusetts

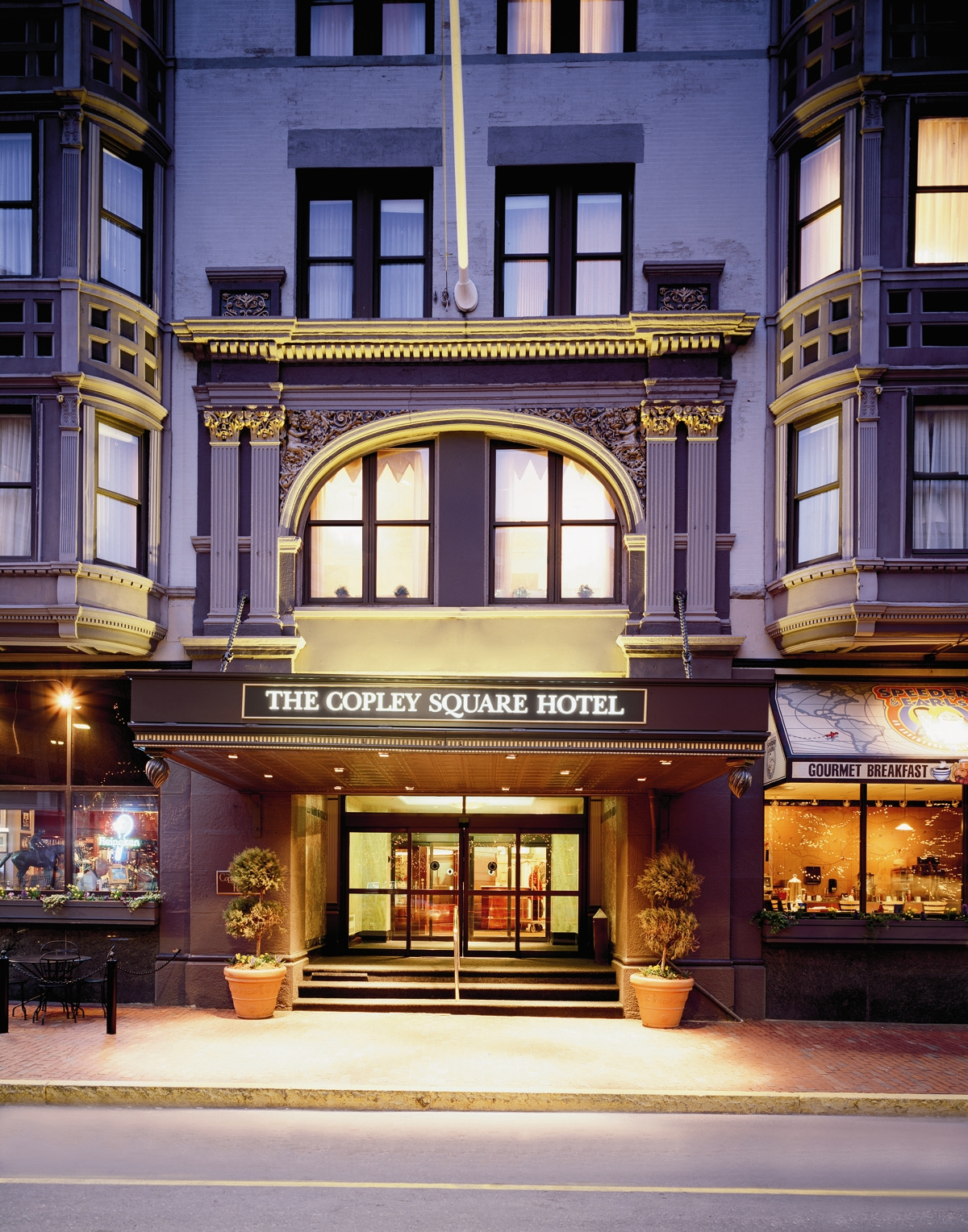
- Front of the hotel, Huntington Avenue

- Location within Massachusetts

General information
- Location: Boston, Massachusetts, United States
- Coordinates: 42°20′54.22″N 71°04′43.20″W
- Opening: 1891
- Owner: CapStar, Inc.
- Operator: Benchmark Resorts & Hotels

Technical details
- Floor count: 7

Design and construction
- Architect: Fred R. Pope

Other information
- Number of rooms: 143
- Number of suites: 6
- Number of restaurants: 2
- Parking: Valet Parking

Website
- www.copleysquarehotel.com

The Copley Square Hotel is a hotel in the Back Bay area of Boston, Massachusetts. It was built in 1891 on Huntington Avenue and Exeter Street, and has the distinction of being the city’s second-oldest hotel in continuous operation.

The Copley Square Hotel opened on July 4, 1891. At the time it was one of the finest first-class hotels in the city, and its location was at the edge of the most aristocratic part of Back Bay, making it one of the most desirable places at which to stop. The hotel was convenient for the railroad stations, trading centers, places of amusement and the electric car service. The hotel (or house as it was called at the time) originally had 300 elegantly furnished rooms, single and en suite, with private parlors and baths. The original proprietors were F.S. Risteen & Co. and the total cost to open the hotel was $300,000.

The Copley Square Hotel was built near what is present day Copley Square. The square was named in honor of John Singleton Copley, the American painter, and is bordered by the Boston Public Library, Trinity Church, and Old South Church. The hotel's architect was Fred R. Pope. The seven-floor hotel is mainly constructed of brick. The U-shaped building is strongly supported by pilings driven to a depth of 70 feet below the street level.

The hotel was the election headquarters for President William McKinley, and has hosted many celebrities including sports legend Babe Ruth and jazz artists Sydney Bechet, Ella Fitzgerald, Billie Holiday and Duke Ellington in the Storyville Jazz Club. Before the United States entered World War II, it became the headquarters of the pro-Nazi Boston Christian Front; the office operating out of the hotel was shut down in 1942. Most recently, in its lower lobby, the former Cafe Budapest, it was host for the filming of scenes in the 1992 comedy movie "HouseSitter" starring Goldie Hawn and Steve Martin.

On January 24, 2008, the Copley Square Hotel closed for a multi-million dollar property-wide renovation - emerging in January 2009 as a contemporary, luxury boutique hotel. The extensive project included thorough remodeling of all accommodations, as well as the lobby, restaurant, and miniBar (formerly Domani and the Original Sports Saloon).

On November 8, 2019 the hotel was bought by Hawkins Way Capital, a real estate investment firm based in Beverly Hills, California.
