= Alcibiades DeBlanc =

American judge

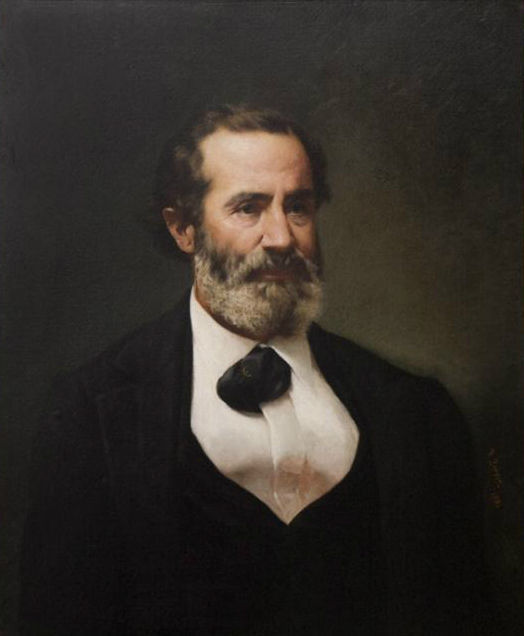

Associate Justice of the Louisiana Supreme Court
- In office 1877–1880

Personal details
- Born: September 16, 1821 St. Martinville, Louisiana
- Died: November 8, 1883 (aged 62) St. Martinville, Louisiana
- Party: Democratic
- Spouse: Mathilde Briant
- Children: 8

Military service
- Allegiance: Confederate States
- Branch/service: Confederate States Army
- Years of service: 1861 - 1865
- Rank: Colonel
- Battles/wars: American Civil War

Jean Maximilien Alcibiades Derneville DeBlanc (September 16, 1821 – November 8, 1883) was a lawyer and state legislator in Louisiana. He served as a colonel for the Confederate Army during the American Civil War. Afterwards, he founded the Knights of the White Camelia, a white insurgent militia that operated from 1867–1869 to suppress freedmen's voting, disrupt Republican Party political organizing and try to regain political control of the state government in the 1868 election. A Congressional investigation overturned 1868 election results in Louisiana.

DeBlanc continued to oppose Reconstruction. During the Battle of Liberty Place in 1874, he commanded 600 men during an uprising to overthrow Governor William Pitt Kellogg after a disputed election. He was arrested briefly and held by U.S. Marshals. In 1876 he was appointed by Democratic governor Francis T. Nicholls as a Louisiana Supreme Court Justice after white Democrats regained political control in the state.

== Early life and family ==
Jean Maximilien Alcibiades Derneville DeBlanc was born in 1821 in St. Martinville, Louisiana. He was the great-great-grandson of Louis Juchereau de St. Denis, founder of Natchitoches, Louisiana. DeBlanc had French ancestors, whose descendants had been in Louisiana since the early colonial period.

== Civil War ==
A lawyer and former state legislator, DeBlanc enlisted June 19, 1861, at Camp Moore, Louisiana. He was captain of Company C in the Eighth Louisiana Infantry, which became attached to the Army of Northern Virginia. He was promoted to major in 1862 and then lieutenant colonel at Fredericksburg, Virginia, on April 6, 1863. He was captured at Banks Ford May 4, 1863, and paroled at Old Capitol Prison in Washington a short time later.

He was present at the Battle of Gettysburg in July 1863, where he assumed command of a regiment when the regiment's commander was killed. He suffered an arm wound and was promoted to the rank of colonel July 2, 1863, by Confederate President Jefferson Davis. Upon returning to Louisiana in 1864, he commanded Confederate reserve troops at Natchitoches. He surrendered to Union General Francis J. Herron in June 1865 and aided Herron in maintaining order in the former Confederate areas of Louisiana until Union forces arrived.

== Knights of the White Camelia ==
DeBlanc was a co-founder and commander (from 1867 to 1868) of the Knights of the White Camelia. Daniel Dennett, a newspaper editor of the Planters' Banner of Franklin, Louisiana was the other co-founder of the organization and had come to the state from Iowa in 1842. This was an insurgent group founded to oppose the implementation of Congressional Reconstruction in Louisiana; it was similar to chapters of Ku Klux Klan and later paramilitary groups in Louisiana and other states. The goal of the Knights of the White Camelia was victory for the Democratic party, by whatever means necessary, in the presidential election of November 1868. This was achieved. More votes were counted for the Democratic candidate, Horatio Seymour, than there were registered Democratic voters in the state. Due to the widespread violence and intimidation tactics against blacks in the effort to suppress freedmen's voting, in addition to electoral fraud, a congressional investigation resulted in overturning the results of the 1868 election in Louisiana.

The Knights of the White Camelia were no longer active after the 1868 election, but other paramilitary groups arose to carry on an insurgency with the goal of regaining political control. The White League in Louisiana, which DeBlanc later joined and became a prominent commander for, and the Red Shirts and White-Liners in Mississippi used similar intimidation tactics in the 1870s against Republicans. Elections were surrounded by violence and fraud.

DeBlanc also continued to oppose the Reconstruction effort; he was influential in commanding 600 men to oppose the disputed election of Governor William Kellogg in 1874. His forces were among thousands of armed White League members in what was called the Battle of Liberty Place who opposed Metropolitan troops in New Orleans, then the seat of government. They took control of the legislature and major buildings for three days before retreating in advance of federal troops. DeBlanc was briefly arrested and held by US Marshals, but never charged. He was considered a hero and known as the "King of the Cadiens" (Acadians).

In 1877, DeBlanc was appointed by Democratic governor Francis T. Nicholls as a Louisiana Supreme Court Justice after white Democrats regained political control in the state. Federal troops were withdrawn soon after. He served January 9, 1877, to April 5, 1880, his service being ended by the passage of a new constitution changing the structure of the court. DeBlanc returned to St. Martinville.

He died in 1883 at the age of 62.
