= August Schirmer =

August Schirmer as a Reichstag member in 1938

August Schirmer (born 16 June 1905 in Celle; died 30 October 1948 in Celle) was a German architect, engineer, elected member of the Reichstag, Central Office Manager in the Amt Rosenberg. From 1939 until 1943 he was head of an antisemitic propaganda publication service and news agency called Welt-Dienst (World Service), originally founded by Ulrich Fleischhauer.

== Life and work ==
Schirmer attended a Gymnasium in Celle and studied architecture at the Technische Hochschule Hannover. After 1929, he worked as a foreman at the Prussian Hochbauamt in Torgau. From 1930 to 1933 he was a research assistant at the Hanover University in Hanover and from the winter semester 1935/36 on he served there as a political education lecturer.

== Political activism ==
In May 1929, he joined the National Socialist German Students' League (NSDStB) and, on 1 February 1930, the Nazi Party at Hanover (membership number 192,692). From July 1933, he acted within the party as the training officer and cultural administrator in Gau Southern Hanover-Brunswick. In July 1934, he was appointed to the Reichstag in place of the murdered Ernst Röhm. At the 1936 election, he was elected as a deputy from electoral constituency 20 (Cologne-Aachen) and, in 1938, he was elected from constituency 6 (Pomerania).

For most of his career Schirmer was a functionary in the Amt Rosenberg (Rosenberg Bureau), a collection of offices under the direction of Reichsleiter Alfred Rosenberg. Beginning on 1 November 1935 he went to work in the Welt-Dienst organization, overseeing its American Section. When Rosenberg reorganized antisemitic propaganda operations in 1939, wresting full control of the Welt-Dienst news service from its founder Ulrich Fleischhauer, Schirmer became its head in July 1939. Shortly afterwards he announced the relocation of the offices to Frankfurt am Main, where all anti-Jewish 'research establishments' under Alfred Rosenberg's direction were concentrated. In addition, Schirmer continued to be involved in Nazi cultural plunder activities for the vast Amt Rosenberg operation once World War II began. Schirmer was Oberreichsleiter (general director) of the Netherlands Task Force (AG Niederlande; later HAG) from September 1940 until May 1941. When Schirmer resigned from Welt-Dienst it was being published in 18 languages. His replacement as editor of Welt-Dienst occurred in September 1943, after Schirmer came under suspicion of fraud because he had allegedly taken a valuable postage stamp collection seized in Paris from Jewish owners for his own private purposes rather than those of the German state.

Schirmer died 30 October 1948 in the St. Josef-Stift hospital in Celle and is buried there in the city cemetery.

== Sources ==
- de:August Schirmer
- de:Amt Rosenberg
- [August Schirmer], "Bericht über die Tätigkeit des Einsatzstabes der Dienststelle des Reichleiters Rosenberg in des westlichen besetzten Gebieten und den Niederlanden: Arbeitsgruppe Niederlande," in Trial of the Major War Criminals before the International Military Tribunal, Nuremberg, 14 November 1945–1 October 1946 (Nuremberg, 1947–1949), Documents in Evidence, vol. 25, pp. 247–55 (Exhibit USA–707; 176–PS). English translation: "Report on the Activities of the Einsatzstab of the Bureau of the Reichsleiter Rosenberg in the Occupied Western Territories and the Netherlands, Working Group Netherlands," in Nazi Conspiracy and Aggression, Office of United States Chief of Counsel for Prosecution of Axis Criminality (Washington, DC: U.S. GPO, 1946), vol. 3, pp. 200–09. The list probably dates from April or May 1941. The published version incorrectly gave "Schimmer" as his name.
- [August Schirmer], voice recording, in Deutsche National-Discographie, Series 6, Discographie der Judaica-Aufnahmen, Volume 1, edited by Rainer E. Lotz und Axel Weggen. Bonn: Birgit Lotz Verlag, 2006; ISBN 978-3-9810248-3-8. "An annotated 78rpm discography of sound documents relating to Jewish life in Germany, or in German language, or recorded in German speaking countries, covering Jewish life, humour, music and religion, Zionism, anti-Semitism, and the Holocaust."
