= Ulrich Fleischhauer =

German publisher

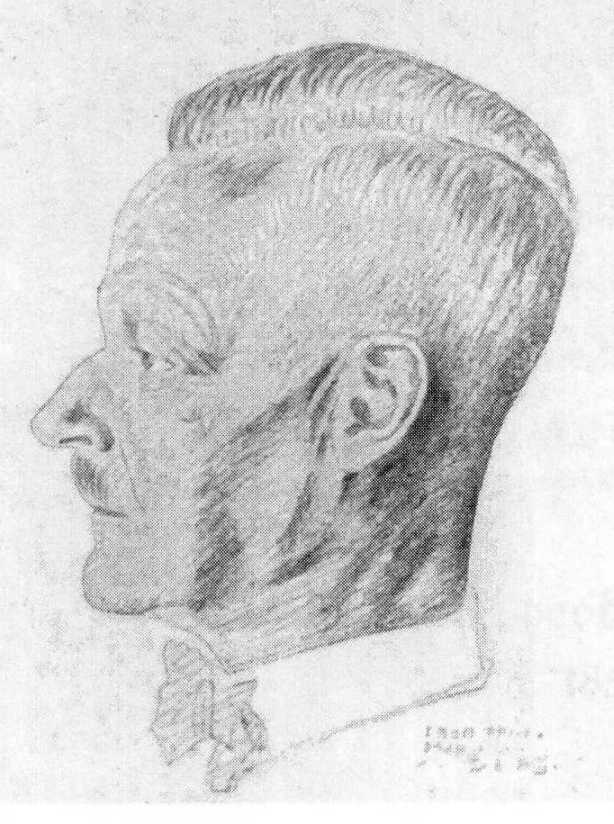
Portrait of Ulrich Fleischhauer by Gregor Schwartz-Bostunitsch

Ulrich Fleischhauer (14 July 1876 – 20 October 1960) (Pseudonyms Ulrich Bodung, and Israel Fryman) was a leading publisher of antisemitic books and news articles reporting on a perceived Judeo-Masonic conspiracy theory and "nefarious plots" by clandestine Jewish interests to dominate the world.

== Early life ==
Fleischhauer was born in Thamsbrück, Thuringia, Germany, the son of a Lutheran deacon. His career was at first grounded in the Imperial German Army where by 1918 Fleischhauer rose to the rank of Lieutenant-Colonel and regimental commander of a field artillery unit in Colmar. After suffering serious wounds, Fleischhauer retired from military service and received a government pension, although he continued to serve for some time as chairman of the National Federation of German Officers (Nationalverbandes Deutscher Offiziere).

After the army, Fleischhauer sought out something else to do full-time. The draw of the public policy arena attracted him. In the aftermath of the defeat of the German and Austria-Hungarian empires, a number of new political parties emerged, many arguing for pan-Germanism. Fleischhauer joined the German National People's Party (Deutschnationale Volkspartei, or DNVP) and was a representative of the far right wing.

Intellectually, Fleischhauer was a disciple of Theodor Fritsch and through their common Völkisch movement circles he also developed friendships with a number of other revolutionary nationalists in secretive Aryan organizations such as the Thule Society. Fleischhauer was especially close to poet and political activist Dietrich Eckart, an early backer of Adolf Hitler.

== Entry into publishing ==
Fleischhauer's connections to revolutionary nationalists led him to create an anti-Jewish publishing firm called U. Bodung-Verlag in Erfurt, Germany that over time became increasingly powerful. Its rise in influence corresponded with the popular successes of National Socialism during the later Weimar period, leading up to the establishment of the Third Reich.

On 1 December 1933, he founded Welt-Dienst or Weltdienst (World-Service, Service Mondial etc.) which served as an international antisemitic news agency and journalistic source for numerous other publications. For a nominal fee, subscribers to Welt-Dienst's twice monthly series of mimeographed information sheets received summaries of news stories and other developments worldwide which tended to discredit anyone and anything linked to Judaism and Jewish Bolshevism.

== Controversial Berne Trial expands Fleischhauer's influence ==
Fleischhauer's influence grew in 1934–1935 following his participation in Switzerland as a key defense organizer at the Berne Trial of distributors of the book The Protocols of the Elders of Zion. This notorious title had re-entered the headlines in June 1933 when a Swiss organization known as the Nationale Front began distributing it during a right wing demonstration.

In 1934, Dr. Alfred Zander, a Swiss Nazi, further inflamed public opinion by publishing a series of articles accepting The Protocols' description of a Jewish plot to take over the world as fact. Outraged, a group of leading Swiss Jews filed a lawsuit in the Amtsgericht (district court) of Bern on 29 October 1934 to censor The Protocols as "indecent writings" under a Bernese statute prohibiting the distribution of "immoral, obscene or brutalizing" texts.

The plaintiffs were represented by Georges Brunschvig and Emil Raas. Vladimir Burtsev, a Russian émigré, anti-Bolshevik and anti-Fascist who exposed numerous Okhrana agent provocateurs in the early 1900s, served as a witness for the plaintiffs at the Berne Trial. Subsequently, while in Paris Burtsev published a Russian-language book in 1938 based on his testimony called The Protocols of the Elders of Zion: A proven forgery.

Welt-Dienst entered the picture by spearheading efforts to secure other Russian émigré experts as part of the effort to defend the veracity of The Protocols. Defense testimony presented personally in court was limited, with Zander turning up as the only witness for the defendants. However, Fleischhauer helped coordinate efforts by other defense experts and himself provided media with extensive commentary and written material in support of the defendants (Theodore Fischer and Silvio Schnell), with Bodung-Verlag issuing a comprehensive German-language version of his The real Protocols of the Learned Elders of Zion. Expert's report.

Despite these exertions, on 19 May 1935, the court declared The Protocols to be forgeries, plagiarisms, and obscene literature. The Judge Walter Meyer, a Christian who had not heard of The Protocols prior to the trial, said in conclusion: "I hope the time will come when nobody will be able to understand how in 1935 nearly a dozen sane and responsible men were able for two weeks to mock the intellect of the Bern court discussing the authenticity of the so-called Protocols, the very Protocols that, harmful as they have been and will be, are nothing but laughable nonsense".

However, on 1 November 1937, the defendants appealed the verdict to the Obergericht (Cantonal Supreme Court) of Berne. A panel of three judges acquitted them, holding that The Protocols, while false, did not violate the statute at issue because they were used as a means of political propaganda.

The presiding judge's opinion stated, for the record, that in his opinion the forgery of The Protocols was not in question and expressed regret that the law did not provide adequate protection for Jews from this sort of literature. The court also imposed the fees for both trials on the defendants. This decision gave grounds for later allegations that the appeal court "confirmed the authenticity of The Protocols", which is opposite to the facts—even though technically the pro-Nazi side won the case. A definitive scholarly work on the trial is a 139-page monograph by Swiss artist Urs Lüthi.

Other especially important scholarly work on the controversy continues to be published by researcher Michael Hagemeister.

== Worldwide propaganda ==
The excitement engendered by his appearance at the trial was a boon to Fleischhauer. By the mid-1930s, the Welt-Dienst emerged as the largest antisemitic operation in the world, publishing works in many foreign languages, and the nearest fascist equivalent to the rival communist Third International (Comintern).

Fleischhauer credited a conversation he had years earlier with Eckart with sparking the original idea. In April 1938 he wrote the NSDAP Hauptarchiv that "Dietrich Eckart then spoke to me alone, in a wine-cellar where we were sitting, about the subject which could today describe the Welt-Dienst. He said something to the effect: 'If our idea comes to power, the Jew will try again, as he's tried before with any State which attempts to solve the Jewish Problem, to starve us out. And if that's no use, then try to ruin us through wars and revolutions. Adolf must therefore have an international movement that can help him from the outside, just as Der Stahlhelm and other groups help the Party from the outside today.'"

Over time, a veritable international "who's who" of antisemitic collaborators and correspondents contributed to Welt-Dienst publications and in turn quoted from them, including Henry Coston (France), Louis Darquier (France), Arnold Leese (founder of the Imperial Fascist League in Britain), Ludwig Heiden ("Luis el-Hadj" – an SS official and journalist who converted to Islam and translated Hitler's Mein Kampf into the Arabic language), Ion Moţa (or Motza, one of the leaders of the ultranationalist Iron Guard from Romania who fought on the fascist side as a volunteer in the Spanish Civil War), Juan Sampelayo (secretary of the Falange Party's Jefatura Nacional de Prensa y Propaganda [Department of Exchange of the National Leadership of Press and Propaganda] in Spain), as well as Boris Tödtli (Russia and Switzerland).

In the United States, a number of organizations sympathetic to Nazi ideology subscribed to the inexpensive English-language World-Service bulletins. William Dudley Pelley frequently printed World-Service articles in his Silver Legion of America magazine, Liberation, advocating a "purge of Jews and Communists in Hollywood". Other American publications, including Father Charles Coughlin's Social Justice, Robert Edward Edmondson's American Vigilante Bulletins, and those issued by the Rev. Gerald Burton Winrod, were equally willing to push the World-Service line on the Jewish question via word-for-word syndicated reproduction of news items appearing in their periodicals. When it suited his purposes, Fleischhauer published Jewish authors such as Marcus Eli Ravage, a Romanian emigrant to the United States.

== Host of international antisemitic congresses ==
During the 1930s, Fleischhauer further expanded his propaganda efforts by organizing the Pan-Aryan Anti-Jewish Union and a series of international antisemitic congresses to actively push for the suppression of Freemasonry, combat the alleged "Jewish conspiracy for world domination," and encourage the geopolitical depopulation of Jews from within Europe through mandatory resettlement in southern Africa as was envisioned by the Nazi-promoted Madagascar Plan.

Typical of this rhetoric were the views expressed by a Japanese representative to the Welt-Dienst congress hosted in 1938 by Fleischhauer. On behalf of Imperial Japan, he stated that "Judeo-Masonry is forcing the Chinese to turn China into a spearhead for an attack on Japan, and thereby forcing Japan to defend herself against this threat. Japan is at war not with China but with Freemasonry, represented by General Chiang Kai-shek, the successor of his master, the Freemason Sun Yat-Sen".

== Fleischhauer superseded at Welt-Dienst ==
For many years Fleischhauer and his activities at Welt-Dienst took place with the approval of the Nazi regime. As was the case with a number of similar organizations and their leaders, he received secret direct financing from the German government. From 1933-37 this funding came from Joseph Goebbels' Reich Ministry for Public Enlightenment and Propaganda. After a shakeup in lines of authority, by 1938 the responsibility for international antisemitism was shifted to the Foreign Affairs Office of the Nazi Party (Aussenpolitisches Amt der NSDAP, shortened to APA). This was one of several agencies within the vast Amt Rosenberg (Rosenberg Bureau or Rosenberg Office), the collective term for the various agencies controlled by Reichsleiter Alfred Rosenberg.

However, Fleischhauer's personal role at Welt-Dienst declined as Germany neared the start of World War II. Researcher Carmen Callil reports that Fleischhauer's political radicalism was beginning to hurt the Third Reich's international image. By 1938, she writes, "Hitler was advised that Fleischhauer was placing Germany in embarrassing positions abroad, as he was the kind of ‘anti-Semite who pretends to see a threatening Jew behind every street corner of the world and who tries to deal with the matter in a psychosis of fear and secretiveness’."

In late July 1939, August Schirmer, an Amt Rosenberg functionary who had headed the "American Section" of Welt-Dienst, took over publication of the periodical and its related operations. This change was connected with a relocation of Welt-Dienst's editorial offices to Frankfurt am Main as part of a more formal reorganization of all anti-Jewish research establishments under Rosenberg's control, culminating in 1941 with the establishment of the Institut der NSDAP zur Erforschung der Judenfrage (Institute of the National Socialist German Workers Party for Research Into the Jewish Question). Fleischhauer was largely cut out of the publishing empire he founded. In fact, in 1941 he was living in the cellar of his home in Erfurt, running only a "tiny rump" version of the organizations he created as the focus of his life's work.

The Welt-Dienst organization on the other hand continued for a time to prosper. By its high point in August 1943 Welt-Dienst was published in 18 languages. At that time, Schirmer stepped down and was replaced by an individual named Kurt Richter, who in addition to being the new publisher was also director of an "International Institute for the Enlightenment of the Jewish Question". As the war turned against Nazi Germany, Welt-Dienst continued with diminished distribution until finally ending all publication operations early in 1945.

== After the war ==
During the post-war occupation, Fleischhauer underwent denazification in a series of American internment camps and hospitals where he was held from 1945–46. Upon his release in 1947, Fleischhauer even issued a written statement in which he denied any Nazi or fanatical antisemitic views.

After this Fleischhauer retired from public life and lived quietly until his death on 20 October 1960 in Giengen.

== See also ==
- George E. Deatherage
- Elizabeth Dilling
- Fascism worldwide#United States
- L. Fry
- Great Sedition Trial of 1944
- Joe McWilliams

== Chronology ==
- 1 December 1933 - 15 June 1939, World-Service (Erfurt: Bondung-Verlag) edited and headed by its founder, Ulrich Fleischhauer.
- beginning 1 July 1939 - 1 September 1943, World-Service (Frankfurt am Main: Welt-Dienst-Verlag) edited and headed by August Schirmer.
- from 15 September 1943 - January 1945 [end of publication], World-Service (Frankfurt am Main: Welt-Dienst-Verlag) under the direction of Kurt Richter.
