= National Gentile League =

American antisemitic organization

National Gentile League, Inc., also known as the American Gentile League, was an American antisemitic organization active in the 1930s. It was incorporated by B. E. Clark, W. N. Fox and M. L. Burnett in 1934, but it was most notably headed by Donald Shea of Maryland. Lois de Lafayette Washburn acted as the executive secretary for the organization.

When the movie star Edward G. Robinson called for a boycott of all German-made products in 1938, the National Gentile League launched a counter-boycott on Robinson and others who had the "same attitude against gentiles", claiming to represent "12 million True Blue Americans". Donald Shea, acting on behalf of the organization, attempted to defend George Van Horn Moseley in a 1939 House Un-American Activities Committee hearing, but Shea's statement was deleted from the public record as the committee found it so objectionable.

Franklin D. Roosevelt's Secretary of the Interior Harold L. Ickes prohibited the group from using the National Sylvan Theater for a three-day rally that was planned to begin on June 6, 1939. Ickes stated that the Sylvan Theater belonged to Americans of all races and not a group that fosters racial prejudice. During World War II, the US Army prevented Donald Shea's access to four coastal defence commands and ordered him to move to the Midwest in October 1943.

== See also ==
- Antisemitism in Maryland
- Christian Nationalist Crusade
- Silver Shirts
- Crusader White Shirts
