= Frances Sweeney =

American journalist and activist

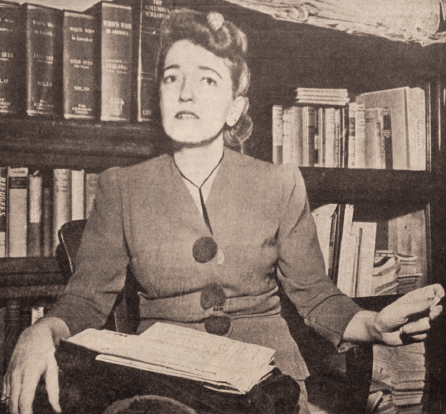
- Sweeney c. 1944
- Born: Frances Ursula; October 21, 1908; Charlestown, Massachusetts, U.S.
- Died: June 19, 1944 (aged 36); Boston, U.S.
- Resting place: Holy Cross Cemetery, Malden, Massachusetts
- Education: Mount Saint Joseph Academy
- Occupation: journalist
- Known for: anti-fascism, anti-antisemitism

Frances Ursula Sweeney (October 21, 1908 – June 19, 1944) was a journalist and activist who campaigned against fascism, antisemitism, and political corruption in 1940s Boston. She edited her own newspaper, the Boston City Reporter, and started the Boston Herald Rumor Clinic to combat fascist disinformation. Seeking to counteract the influence of the priest Charles Coughlin, whose antisemitic broadcasts were popular with Boston's Irish Catholics, she led protests and wrote editorials condemning the Christian Front and similar organizations. She was secretary of the American-Irish Defense Association of Boston and vice chairman of the Massachusetts Citizens' Committee for Racial Unity. A Catholic herself, Sweeney was threatened with excommunication when she criticized Cardinal William Henry O'Connell for his silence on Catholic antisemitism.

== Early life ==
Sweeney was born October 21, 1907 in Charlestown, Massachusetts. The only daughter of James Joseph Sweeney, an Irish-American steamship checker, she grew up in the Charlestown neighborhood and attended Mount Saint Joseph Academy, after previously going to St. Mary's, Charlestown. Sweeney entered Mount. St. Joseph Academy October 29, 1922 and graduated 1927. Upon Sweeney's entrance to Mount St. Joseph Academy, her teacher remarked her as a 'sick girl', later that year she would receive a gold medal in Christian Doctrine. Little is known about her early career except that she worked for a Boston advertising agency.

== Boston City Reporter ==
In the 1930s she founded a small muckraking newspaper, the Boston City Reporter, which she edited and mimeographed herself. Originally she focused on political corruption, but in the late 1930s, she expanded its mission to fighting fascist and antisemitic propaganda. Boston was one of the most antisemitic cities in the United States. Jewish residents, businesses, and synagogues were frequent targets of what would now be called hate crimes: gangs, mostly of Irish Catholic youths, were incited by the priest Charles Coughlin and the Christian Front. They roamed the streets of Jewish neighborhoods, vandalized property, and assaulted residents. Many victims were seriously injured with blackjacks and brass knuckles. As the columnist Nat Hentoff recalled, "Riding by Franklin Field on this trip, I remembered losing some teeth there back then to a gang of readers of Charles Coughlin's Social Justice, who recognized me as a killer of their Lord." Boston's predominately-Irish police, politicians, and clergy were of little help, and the local press largely ignored the problem. Boston's popular Irish mayor, James Michael Curley, once proudly proclaimed Boston "the strongest Coughlin city in the world."

Sweeney was particularly appalled by antisemitism when it came from her fellow Irish-American Catholics. Having been subjected to religious bigotry themselves, she reasoned, they, of all people, ought to know better. She wrote scathing editorials condemning Coughlin, the Christian Front, and anyone else who spread antisemitic or fascist propaganda. She alerted federal agents to the activities of Francis P. Moran, the leader of the Christian Front in Boston. Moran had been distributing Nazi propaganda linked to George Sylvester Viereck and once publicly threatened to "take care of Roosevelt." Alone in a crowd of 2000 Irish Catholics in South Boston, Sweeney protested a speech by Fr. Edward Lodge Curran, a Coughlinite, and was roughly ejected from the hall to a chorus of hisses and boos. In his best-selling exposé of fascist organizations, Under Cover (1943), John Roy Carlson mentioned Sweeney as an inspiration, but likened her work in Boston to "digging at a mountain with a hand spade." According to Carlson, Sweeney's editorials led to Catholic International, a pro-fascist magazine, being banned from the city's principal newsstands. In 1943, Sweeney helped raise public awareness of widespread antisemitism in the Boston police force, which eventually led to the firing of the police commissioner, which was followed by a sharp drop in antisemitic violence in Boston.

Many Catholics considered Sweeney an anticlerical, but she saw herself as a defender of the church against attacks from within. When she criticized Cardinal O'Connell for his silence on Catholic antisemitism, he summoned her to his office and threatened her with excommunication. Other Catholics, such as Bishop Bernard James Sheil of Chicago and Monsignor John A. Ryan of Washington, applauded her.

== Boston Herald Rumor Clinic ==
During World War II, at Sweeney's suggestion, the Boston Herald began a "Rumor Clinic" to combat Axis propaganda and other kinds of harmful rumors. For example, it was rumored that after a woman with permed hair went to work in a munitions factory, her head exploded. Every Sunday, the Herald selected a rumor, carefully tracked it to its source, and refuted it. Sweeney and others volunteered as "morale wardens", tracking down rumors, and conferred with an investigative committee. Sweeney and the Rumor Clinic were featured in Reader's Digest and Life magazines, and similar clinics were started in other cities across the country.

== Death and legacy ==
Sweeney died of rheumatic heart failure, aged 36, on June 19, 1944. She was buried at Holy Cross Cemetery in Malden, Massachusetts.

After her death, Irving Stone wrote, "Fran Sweeney could not be discouraged, could not be beaten down, could not be frightened, could not be put in her place. She was a one-man crusade. She burned with some of the hottest and most unextinguishable passion for social justice that I have ever seen."

In 1944, the Bishop Sheil School for Social Service in Chicago posthumously awarded Sweeney the Pope Leo XIII Medal "for outstanding work in combating prejudice and injustice and in advancing social education." Sweeney's mother accepted the medal on her behalf.

The Frances Sweeney Committee, an organization dedicated to fighting antisemitism, was named in her honor. It was later active in combating Father Feeney, a Catholic priest who stirred up antisemitism in Boston in the 1950s.

Nat Hentoff, who worked for the Boston City Reporter as a teen, was profoundly influenced by Sweeney. His memoir, Boston Boy, is dedicated to her.

== Sources ==
- Carlson, John Roy (1943). Under Cover: My Four Years in the Nazi Underworld of America. New York: E. P. Dutton & Co., Inc.
- Currier, Isabel (August 18, 1944). "Frances Sweeney: Boston's One-Woman Crusade Against 'Anti-Semites, Christian Fronters and Fanatical Isolationists'". Commonweal. 40: 427–429.
- Goldstein, Jenny (2001). "Transcending Boundaries: Boston's Catholics and Jews, 1929–1965". Boston College Center for Christian-Jewish Learning.
- Hentoff, Nat (2012). Boston Boy: Growing up with Jazz and Other Rebellious Passions. Philadelphia: Paul Dry Books. ISBN 9781589882584.
- Hentoff, Nat (December 16, 2001). "Things Ain't What They Used to Be: 'Boston Boy' Nat Hentoff Comes Back to Roxbury". The Boston Globe. ProQuest 405430363.
- McNamara, Eileen (March 12, 2000). "Now, Practice What You Preach". The Boston Globe. ProQuest 405334458. Archived from the original on October 11, 2016.
- McGrory, Mary (September 15, 1975). "Magical magnets in Boston". The Chicago Tribune.
- Norwood, Stephen H. (2003). "Marauding Youth and the Christian Front: Antisemitic Violence in Boston and New York During World War II". American Jewish History. 91 (2). The Johns Hopkins University Press: 233–267. doi:10.1353/ajh.2004.0055. JSTOR 23887201. S2CID 162237834.
- Sarna, Jonathan D.; et al. (2005). The Jews of Boston. Yale University Press. ISBN 9780300107876.
- Taylor, Steven J. L. (1998). Desegregation in Boston and Buffalo: The Influence of Local Leaders. SUNY Press. ISBN 9780791439197.
- "Voices of Defeat". LIFE. April 13, 1942. pp. 99–100.
- "Rumor Clinic: Boston finds truth is best arm against stories that harm morale". LIFE. October 12, 1942. pp. 88, 90–92, 94.
- U.S. Congress (1945). "Late Frances Sweeney Given Pope Leo XIII Medal". Congressional Record: Proceedings and Debates of the 79th Congress, First Session. 91. U.S. Government Printing Office.
- "Crowd Overflows Hall to Hear Rev. Dr. Curran: Critic Ejected From Throng in So. Boston". The Boston Globe. March 16, 1942. ProQuest 820830401. Archived from the original on 2 February 2017.
- "Frances Sweeney: Services on Wednesday for Racial Unity Leader". The Boston Globe. June 20, 1944. ProQuest 840220524. Archived from the original on 2 February 2017.
- "The Boston Herald Rumor Clinic of World War II". New England Historical Society. 5 August 2015.
