= George E. Deatherage =

American antisemitic political agitator (1892–1965)

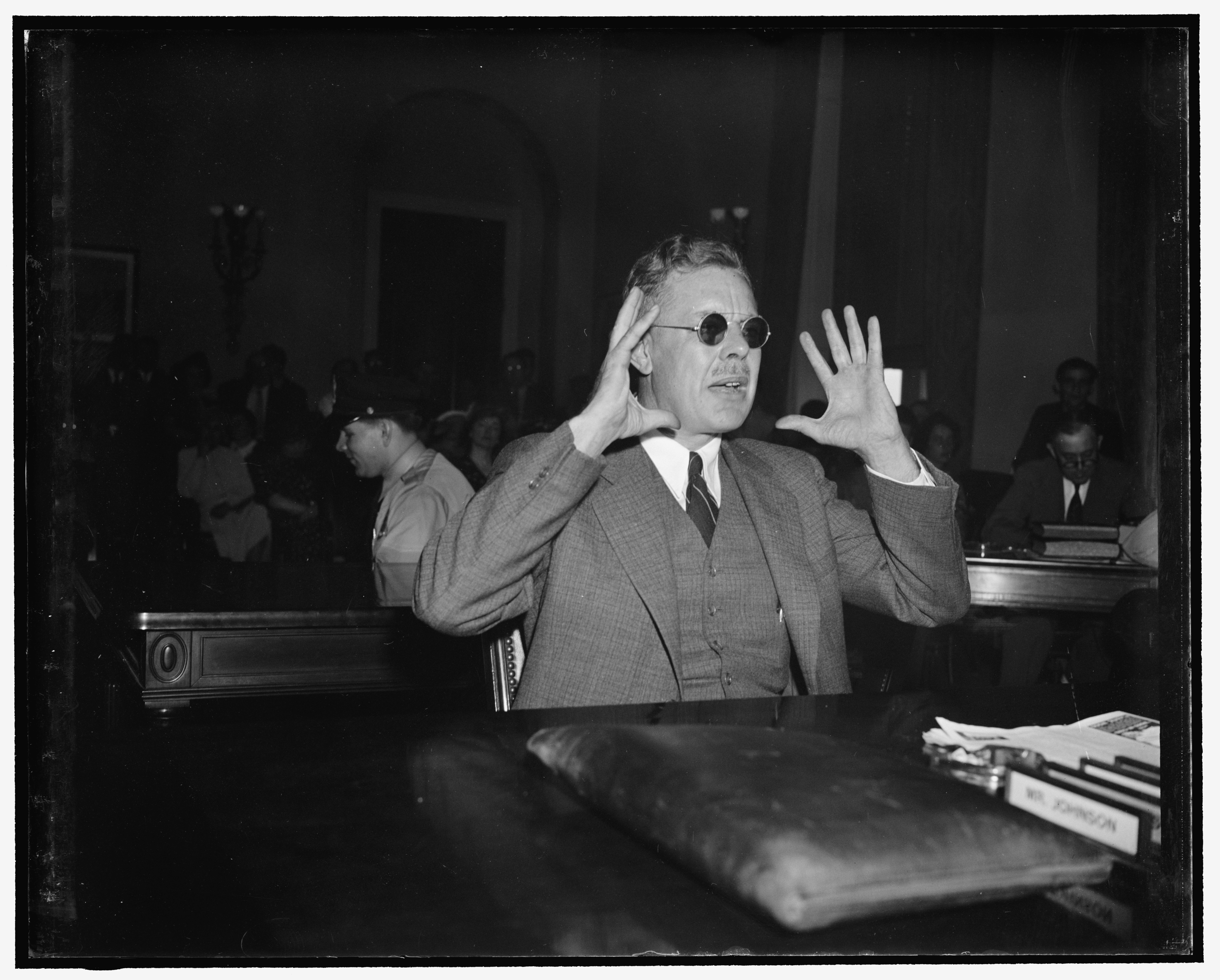
Deatherage testifying before Congress in 1939

George Edward Deatherage (November 15, 1892 – March 31, 1965) was an American political agitator and a promoter of nationalism. A native of Minnesota and an engineer by training, he authored several books on construction. He is best remembered for his political activities. Deatherage was the founder of a later version of the Knights of the White Camellia and the American Nationalist Confederation, the latter being an attempt to unify dozens of racist, fascist, and antisemitic groups nationwide. In the 1930s, Deatherage was a central figure in a fascist plot to overthrow the federal government. He described fascism as a "patriotic revolt such as the revolt of the White Russians against Jewocracy."

Deatherage said, "I believe it will take military action to get the gang (Roosevelt administration) out," and proposed persuading officers in the U.S. Army reserve to lead a fascist army, choosing Major General George Van Horn Moseley, a prominent American supporter of Nazism, as a potential military dictator. He testified before the Dies Committee in 1939.

Deatherage was an important player in domestic and international anti-Jewish circles in the 1930s and 1940s, including collaboration with the Welt-Dienst/World-Service propaganda agency headed by German Ulrich Fleischhauer. Both men were defendants in the Great Sedition Trial of 1944.

After the war, Deatherage joined the John Birch Society.

== Opposition to the New Deal ==
In his editorial Nationalism Will Save America, Deatherage warned Americans of the "planned Sovietization of America," which he claimed was taking place under the New Deal's agrarian policies. He claimed that the crop control plans implemented by Secretary of Agriculture Henry A. Wallace through the Agricultural Adjustment Act were similar to Stalin's agrarian reforms in the Soviet Union, which had resulted in "the starvation of eight million people, punitive expeditions, and liquidation squads."

"Christian Russian people died by the millions, as they will probably die here, because they said 'It could not happen here.'"

Fascism, Deatherage said, was justifiable since it "sets out to do all it can to defend and encourage the institution of private property, especially in the form of small ownership … and small agricultural proprietors." In America, he said, private property was guaranteed "under a Christian government, and not an anti-Christian dictatorship of alien Jewry." While Deatherage conceded that the New Deal advocated "many … good things," it ultimately had "the planned aim of ultimate destruction of Christian people."

"Nationalism is offered not because it is perfect, but because it is your only salvation from becoming a sweated laborer under the Jewish lash."

== Call for Nazi-style regime in the United States ==
In 1938, Deatherage was invited to Germany to attend an international antisemitism conference in Erfurt. There, he gave a speech titled Will America be the Jews’ Waterloo?, in which he praised Germany and denounced Jews and communism.

"It is a great and much anticipated pleasure to be able to extend to the patriots of Germany and the many other nations represented here today—at this great conference—the greetings and good wishes from your American brothers. For, after all, we are all brothers in race and culture, devoting our lives to a common cause, a cause which ultimately must mean the salvation of the world for Christian and Aryan people."

Deatherage called Jewish communists the greatest threat that humanity had ever faced:

"The greatest crisis since the Dark Ages was Jewish Communism. All of us – from every nation on earth, [must] cooperate and coordinate our efforts towards destroying the power of Jewish Communism – forever [!] … That is our primary reason for our being assembled here together.”

He requested support to overthrow the federal government and install a Nazi-like regime:

"The United States today is in the death grip of forces alien to our past history, our aims, and our Christian ideals. Either we rid ourselves of alien Jewish Internationalism, or suffer ourselves to be wiped out as a free Christian people."

Near the end of his speech, Deatherage praised the swastika, which the American Nationalist Confederation had adopted as its symbol:

"As it brought Germany out of the depths of despair, so it will bring the United States."

Alfred Rosenberg admired Deatherage's speech so much that he had it republished four years later in the March 1942 edition of Gelbe Hefte: Historische und politische Zeitschrift für das katholische Deutschland, an influential Roman Catholic journal that supported the Nazi Party.

== Coup plans ==
Deatherage planned to launch a violent coup after the 1940 elections. As part of this plan, he attempted to unify dozens of racist, fascist, and antisemitic groups nationwide into a united front known as the American Nationalist Confederation. A 1937 meeting of the Confederation was attended by Deatherage's Knights of the White Camellia, the American branch of the Militant Christian Patriots, Silver Legion of America, Defenders of the Christian Faith, Edmondson Economic Service, the East Coast branch of the American Vigilant Intelligence Federation, National Liberty Party, American Rangers, American White Guard, American People's Party, Crusaders for Economic Liberty, Washington's Bodyguards, the German American Bund, and far-right activists Charles B. Hudson, James True, and Collis O. Redd.

Deatherage created 13-man armed cells throughout the country which procured weapons. The cells would consist of "four Nazis from the German Bund, Italians with Fascist connections, White Russians and three Americans who 'believe in the Cause'." Clayton F. Ingalls, the husband of aviator and Nazi agent Laura Ingalls, planned to arm each cell with weapons obtained through the National Rifle Association in Washington, D.C. After the elections, the cells would strike all over the country and throw it into chaos. After taking over the government, citizens who refused to surrender peacefully, presumed by the plotters to be Jews and Communists, would be shot. Ingalls said the rebels could not "flinch from issuing orders to field officers to mow down without hesitation the great Communist front." Ingalls and Deatherage were convinced that they had the money and connections necessary to free the country of "Jewish Imperialism and Judeo-Communism." Ingalls was in contact with San Francisco consul Manfred Freiherr von Killinger, while Deatherage had raised $25,000 for weapons, with promises of more from Leslie Fry. Henry Allen, the leader of the American White Guard and a key conspirator in the plot, suggested they could obtain additional guns from James True. In February 1938, True wrote to Allen, "If your friends want some peashooters [rifles], I have connections now for any quantity at the right price." At the bottom of the typed letter, True added a handwritten sentence: "But be very careful about controlling this information and destroy this letter."

According to documents found in one of Allen's briefcases in April 1938, Deatherage, Leslie Fry, and Vladimir Kositsin (another White Russian fascist emigrant) had discussed the possibility of recruiting U.S. Army General George Van Horn Moseley into the plot. The plan was to have Moseley become the military dictator of the United States, under the guise of protecting the nation from communism. The plot was later uncovered by American Jews, including Leon Lewis and his spy ring, and then handed over to U.S. intelligence authorities. It was exposed to the public in Ken magazine; the editor, Arnold Gingrich, testified in front of the Un-American Activities Committee.

In 1933, shortly after Hitler took power, Allen, Bund member Hermann Schwinn, and two other Nazis traveled to Mexico to help Mexican General Nicolás Rodríguez Carrasco organize the Gold Shirts, a group modeled after the Sturmabteilung. Wanting to hide any direct link between the Nazis and German-funded Gold Shirts, Allen, who could speak Spanish, agreed to serve as liaison between the Silver Shirts, the Los Angeles Bund, and the Gold Shirts. The Gold Shirts intended to launch a fascist takeover of the Mexican government. Allen and Schwinn smuggled weapons and propaganda to the Gold Shirts. In a letter to Deatherage, Allen said he regretted not having the time to meet Canadian Nazi Adrien Arcand, the leader of the National Unity Party of Canada. However, Southern Rhodesian parliament member Henry Hamilton Beamish, a Nazi sympathizer who founded the Britons, had written an introduction letter on behalf of Allen and urged him to make contact with Arcand.

Assistant Attorney General Brien McMahon repeatedly encouraged J. Edgar Hoover to look into Deatherage's plot, but Hoover declined, claiming that investigating communism was more urgent. Finally, the FBI investigated Deatherage after a tip from an amateur printer in Charleston, West Virginia, who had printed materials for Deatherage before realizing the danger they posed to the United States. Deatherage was cooperative, and the investigation was very brief, revealing no information that had not already been published by Ken and the amateur printer.

Deatherage also testified in front of the Un-American Activities Committee regarding Dudley Pierrepont Gilbert and James Campbell's falsified accusation of a conspiracy between Harmonie Club members to set into motion a Jewish communist revolution. He went into great detail about Ku Klux Klan history and his own life, despite representatives' statements of disinterest and irrelevance; he also made many antisemitic remarks. He claimed to have a list of communists working for the Roosevelt administration, and offered it to the committee. They accepted, and offered him a month to collect the documentation and bring it to the Capitol.

In 1942, the United States Navy declared Deatherage to be a person "undesirable to have access to the work of the Navy Department" and directed his discharge from employment as chief engineer for private contractors on a $30,000,000 expansion project at the Norfolk Naval Base.

In November 1952, Deatherage was living in Baltimore when he wrote to J. Edgar Hoover alleging ties between Presidents Roosevelt and Truman, referring to Tom Clark as a "Texas pussywillow". He further suggested that Huey Long was assassinated with "Washington" being aware "eleven minutes ahead of time". Deatherage later joined the John Birch Society.
