= Pat McGrady =

Irish-American journalist (1908–1979)

- Born: 1908; Anaconda, Montana
- Died: 1979 (aged 70–71)
- Occupation: Journalist
- Known for: "This Fascist Racket" (1934); The Savage Cell (1964); The Persecuted Drug: The Story of DMSO (1973)

Patrick Michael McGrady (1908–1979) was an Irish-American journalist. He is known for his anti-fascist writings in the Jewish Daily Bulletin in the 1930s and from 1947 as science editor for the American Cancer Society.

== Early life and family ==
Patrick McGrady was born in 1908 in Anaconda, Montana, to James and Mary McGrady. He married Grace H. Robinson in New York in 1937.

== Journalism ==
In the early 1930s, McGrady was a reporter for the China Press. Later he was a staff writer for the Associated Press in New York. He was also known for his anti-fascist writings, particularly his 1934 series "This Fascist Racket" for New York's Jewish Telegraphic Agency paper, the Jewish Daily Bulletin. His survey of fascist organizations in the United States, Fascism in America (1934), was the result of a year's study in Germany and America. He covered the rise of Adolf Hitler and the Lindbergh Trial in 1935.

== World War II ==
During the Second World War, McGrady was an air combat intelligence officer with the U.S. Marine Corps.

== American Cancer Society ==
From 1947 to 1973 McGrady was science editor for the American Cancer Society. He wrote The Savage Cell: A report on cancer and cancer research that was published in 1964. It was selected as an outstanding book by The American Library Association. In 1973 he wrote The Persecuted Drug: The Story of DMSO which the U.S. government tried to suppress.

== Death ==
McGrady died in 1979, having suffered from colon cancer.

== Selected publications ==
- Fascism in America. Jewish Daily Bulletin, New York, 1934.
- "This Fascist Racket" – series in Jewish Daily Bulletin, 1934.
- The Savage Cell: A report on cancer and cancer research. Basic Books, New York, 1964.
- The Persecuted Drug: The Story of DMSO. Doubleday, New York, 1973. ISBN 0385089317

== See also ==
- Arthur Derounian
