= Jesse M. Lee =

U.S. Army major general

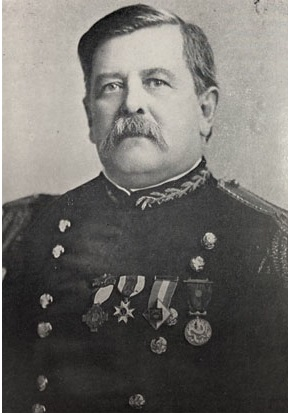
- Born: Jesse Matlock Lee; January 2, 1843; Putnam County, Indiana, U.S.
- Died: March 26, 1926 (aged 83); Washington, D.C., U.S.
- Burial place: Arlington National Cemetery
- Spouse: Lucy Wood Hathaway (m. 1868–1926)
- Children: 1
- Military career
- Allegiance: Union; United States
- Service: Union Army (1861–1865); United States Army (1865–1907)
- Service years: 1861–1907
- Rank: Major General
- Unit: U.S. Army Infantry Branch
- Commands: 10th Infantry Regiment; 9th Infantry Regiment; Department of Texas; Department of the Visayas
- Wars: American Civil War; American Indian Wars; Spanish–American War; Philippine–American War; Boxer Rebellion

Jesse Matlock Lee (January 2, 1843 – March 26, 1926) was a United States Army Brigadier General who was commanding officer of Fort Sam Houston 1904–1906. He was born in Putnam County, Indiana to John and Effie Lee. He married Lucy Wood Hathaway in 1868. Their only child was daughter Maude.

In November 1861, Jesse enlisted in Company B, 59th Indiana Volunteer Infantry as a private and commissary sergeant. He was promoted to second lieutenant in 1862, first lieutenant in 1863, and mustered out of service with the rank of captain in July 1865. He joined the regular army in July 1866 as a second lieutenant and by the time of his retirement on January 2, 1907, he had achieved the rank of major general. Besides the Civil War, General Lee served in the Indian Campaigns in the west, the Spanish-American War, the Philippine Insurrection, and the Boxer Rebellion in China.

Lee was a veteran of the American Indian Wars. In 1877, he was serving as an Indian agent when Oglala Chief Crazy Horse agreed to surrender. At the request of the chief, Lee escorted him to Fort Robinson, Nebraska. Both Lee and Crazy Horse believed that Lee would be able to speak on his behalf. Lieutenant Colonel Luther P. Bradley denied the request.

He served in the Civil War. Spanish-American War, Philippine Insurrection, Boxer Rebellion.

== Death ==
Lee died at Walter Reed Army Medical Center on March 26, 1926, from complications of gangrene. His wife Lucy died June 29, 1938. Both are buried at Arlington National Cemetery.

== See also ==
- Pershing House
