= George W. Christians =

American fascist

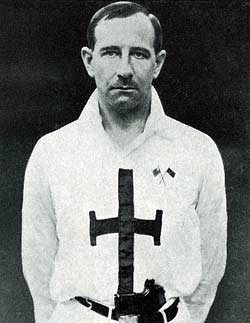
- Born: August 5, 1888; Eldred, New York, U.S.
- Died: June 27, 1983 (aged 94); Chattanooga, Tennessee, U.S.
- Education: Brooklyn Polytechnic Institute
- Occupation: Engineer
- Known for: Founder of the Crusader White Shirts

George William Christians (August 5, 1888 – June 27, 1983) was an American engineer in Chattanooga, Tennessee, who lost a fortune in the Wall Street crash of 1929 and afterwards launched a "paper and ink" campaign for a "revolution for economic liberty" in the United States.

Christians deliberately adopted extreme and sometimes contradictory political positions in order to publicize his economic ideas. He founded the American Reds and then changed their name to the American Fascists when fascism began to rise. He also founded the Crusader White Shirts, an organization that allied itself with fascist causes. He defended the Nazi Oscar C. Pfaus, and the American Jewish press spoke of him in the same breath as American antisemites; but the journalist John Roy Carlson, who spent years undercover in the American right, wrote that Christians was anti-Catholic but not antisemitic. In 1938, Christians described himself as so "red" (communist) that he made Russian "reds" look yellow, and planned a new American revolution for a visit by President Roosevelt to Chattanooga, which would take place under cover of darkness and during which his men would raise the red flag from the city courthouse.

Christians was arrested in 1942, after the United States entered World War II, and charged with sending seditious material to officers of the U.S. Army. He was convicted in the first trial of its kind during the war and sentenced to five years in prison, with a recommendation by the judge that he not be released until after the war was over.

From his jail cell, Christians repudiated his methods but not his beliefs.

== Early life ==
George Christians was born in Eldred, New York, on 5 August 1888, to a German father and a Dutch mother from New York. He received a technical education at the Brooklyn Polytechnic Institute. In 1916, he married Marie L. Stokes in Hamilton, Tennessee.

In 1917, Christians was resident in Chattanooga, Tennessee, when he was drafted into the U.S. Army. His draft documents recorded his occupation as construction manager and that he had served as private in the field artillery of the National Guard in New York. However, the 1930 census does not record him as having served in World War I, and he later declined to say where he was during the conflict.

== Business career ==
Christians was the owner of the American Asphalt Grouting Company, a firm that owned a process that stopped dams from leaking. He made a fortune from the business but lost about $200,000 in the Wall Street crash of 1929 and in 1930 was working as an electrical engineer. As a result of the loss of his fortune, he became a campaigner for economic reform and developed a philosophy based on "human effort instead of gold" that encompassed the abolition of the gold standard, the repudiation of the national debt, and a refusal to pay taxes.

== Crusader White Shirts ==
In the early 1930s, Christians founded the Crusader White Shirts in Chattanooga, Tennessee, claiming in 1934 to Pat McGrady of the Jewish Daily Bulletin that the organization had 10,000 members. Having inspected the records, however, McGrady could find no evidence of any subscriptions or that any meetings of the organization had been held.

Christians described his politics as neither Communist nor Fascist, and deliberately adopted apparently conflicting names and positions in accordance with his belief that a revolutionary leader should promise support to all interests in private and adopt any cause in public that would draw supporters and publicity without accruing too much opposition. He claimed to have started strikes to obtain publicity and to be preparing to send armed men to settle them to gain more. When fascism was on the rise in the early 1930s, he re-branded his American Reds, whose emblem was a red flag with the stars and stripes on top, as the American Fascists, but in 1938 was still claiming to be "so red the Russian Reds are pale yellow in comparison".

In practice, Christians associated himself most closely with far-right and anti-Semitic organizations. His "Secretary of State", C. A. Hester, was a former senior member of the Ku Klux Klan. He tried to raise money from Jews to circulate an edition of the hoax Protocols of the Elders of Zion for the ostensible purpose of exposing the origins of the unjust persecution of the Jews. In 1934, he complained to the Jewish Telegraphic Agency about the "persecution" in Chicago of the Nazi propagandist Oscar C. Pfaus, chairman of the Germanic Alliance.

C. F. Fulliam of the alliance chapter in Muscatine, Iowa, wrote to Christians saying that as "Heil Hitler!" was popular in Germany, "let me salute you as you will be saluted in days to come. Hail! Christians." In 1936 he founded the Crusaders for Economic Liberty in Chicago with the American fascist and anti-Semite Lois de Lafayette Washburn.

Christians posed for photographs with a form of crusader's cross or cross potent on a white shirt and a gun in his belt. More than one observer commented that with his toothbrush moustache he bore a resemblance to Adolf Hitler. An inveterate letter writer in the cause of his "paper and ink revolution", he sent twenty for every one he received, on letterheads showing the Statue of Liberty, crossed American flags, and a torch with a red, white, and blue flame and in green and brown type.

In November 1938, Christians figured in the proceedings of the House Special Committee on Un-American Activities of the United States Congress which noted the large number of organizations with which he was associated or had founded. These included the American Reds and the American Fascists, the Liberty Party, the Crusaders for American Liberty, the Crusader White Shirts, and the Fifty Million Club for Economic Liberty. Christians was once a candidate for Congress from the third Tennessee district.

== Roosevelt and revolution ==
On December 1, 1932, Christians was granted an interview with President-elect Franklin D. Roosevelt at Warm Springs, Georgia, after driving there with his "Minister of Economics", Walter M. Higgins, a Catholic and former salesman for a stocking manufacturer, and insisting that unemployed steel workers were on the point of revolution. Roosevelt listened to Christians' economic ideas and promised to take them into account. According to the Jewish Daily Bulletin, Christians was subsequently questioned for two days by federal agents who doubted his sanity.

It was at that meeting, Christians claimed, that he put it to Roosevelt that he was "only the Kerensky" of an upcoming American "revolution", a moderate who would be overthrown by an American Stalin. The Jewish Daily Bulletin wondered whether Christians saw himself as that Stalin. The idea gained traction in the press and in Washington after William A. Wirt, an opponent of Roosevelt's New Deal who was at Warm Springs at the same time as Christians, alleged that there were communists in the American government who were seeking to undermine the Roosevelt administration and the New Deal, allegations that led to the Bulwinkle investigation in the United States House of Representatives in 1934.

In December 1938, Christians told the press that "revolution" was bound to come to America, and that the American people were in the mood for it. He had timed it for the president's recent visit to Chattanooga before that was cancelled. He planned to cut the power (he had a patent for an electrical fuse), saying "lots of things can happen in the dark", after which his men would seize the town and fly the red flag from the court house, before taking the state capitol of Nashville and moving on California, Chicago, New York, and Washington. He explained that the plan did not go ahead because by the time the President did visit in November, conditions were less suitable for a revolution.

== Assessments ==
Christians was investigated by U.S. Army military intelligence who described him as having "a brilliant mind but of erratic temperament", and as posing no threat. Raymond Moley described him as a "harmless lunatic".

In 1934, Pat McGrady, author of Fascism in America, visited Christians in Chattanooga for New York's Jewish Daily Bulletin and reported that he was mostly ignored there and "quite without honor", unable to get a letter printed in the city's newspapers despite his many attempts. Christians attributed this to a "campaign of silence" by the press but McGrady thought it was because Christians was a crank of the type found in every town and with whom newspaper editors were all too familiar. Nonetheless, he thought that Christians was not as much of a "nut" as some made out, saying:

He is a clever fellow with a fine appreciation of the limits of our broad liberties of speech and action which he strains in promoting his personality and an economic scheme which, if effective, is enough to surrender the rights and properties of the people into the hands of whoever may be strong enough to grasp control of a despairing nation.

Despite his intelligence, McGrady identified in Christians a deep ignorance of the principles of Fascism and of its practice in Germany and Italy, fostered, he thought, by the narrow sources on which Christians was able to draw in Chattanooga in understanding world affairs. This made the question of whether Christians was really a fascist, a moot one.

In 1935, Jay Franklin of Vanity Fair cited Christians as an example of the inability of American radicals to capitalise on the weakness of an antiquated government due to their inability to lead, to follow, or to co-operate, opining of him that what could have been a mass movement was reduced to a one-man-show by his policy of double-crossing and the destruction of local movements in order to attract personal publicity.

In his 1943 book Under Cover: My Four Years in the Nazi Underworld of America, Christians was described by John Roy Carlson (Arthur Derounian) as "an odd combination of comedian and sinister revolutionist", strongly anti-Catholic but not anti-Semitic.

== 1940s ==
In 1940, in an editorial piece titled "Shirts marked Down", The Daily Independent wrote that since the start of the European war (World War Two), the price of Black, Brown, and Red shirts had been reduced and the "1001 leagues, legions, associations, federations, friends of this and that, committees, knights" and similar organizations were in retreat. Leaders were arrested or inactive and with respect to Christians, in Chattanooga the locals "simply refuse to recognize him as a Fascist Menace".

In March 1942, after the United States had joined the war, Christians was arrested under the Smith Act which aimed to counter sedition. He was only the second person to be charged under the act, after Rudolph Fahl of Denver who was arrested simultaneously. It was alleged that Christians had sent communications to the officers of Fort Oglethorpe, Georgia, and Camp Forrest, Tennessee, that might demoralize the army. His literature stated that even in wartime it was permitted to ask questions and posed a series of them, among which was "Are we fighting to make Roosevelt the dictator of the world?" Christians was convicted of four counts of sedition in June, in the first trial of its kind during the war and sentenced to five years imprisonment. The judge, Leslie Darr, recommended that he should not be paroled until after the end of the war.

From his cell, Christians told reporters that he felt that his work had been done and that his conviction had concluded his "paper and ink revolution for economic liberty". He also said that he regretted his "objectionable" methods and that he was glad not to have harmed anyone. Of his economic theories, he said that he had brought them to the attention of the American people and it was up to them what they did with them.

Christians died in Chattanooga on June 27, 1983.

== See also ==
- Alice Barrows
- Business Plot
