= Knights of the White Camelia =

American political organization

- White Camelia
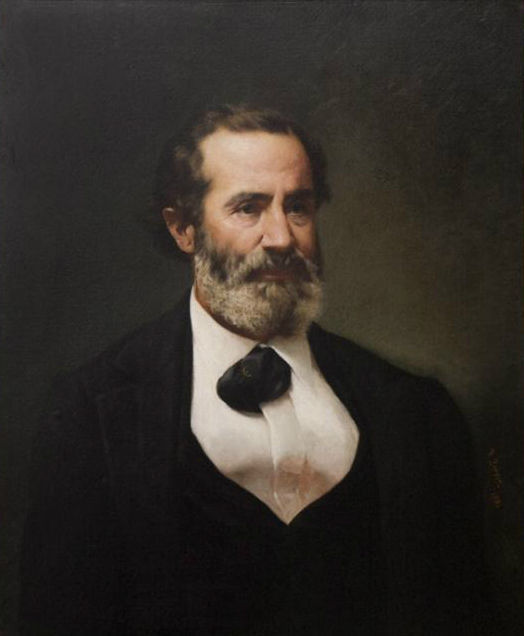
- Alcibiades DeBlanc, the group's founder.
- Leader: Alcibiades DeBlanc
- Dates active: 1867 – c. 1870
- Ideology: White supremacy Neo-Confederatism
- Wars: the Reconstruction Era

The Knights of the White Camelia was an American white supremacist organization that operated in the Southern United States in the late 19th century. Similar to and associated with the Ku Klux Klan, it opposed freedmen's rights.

== History ==
The Knights of the White Camelia (named for the camellia, a type of flower) was founded by Confederate States Army Colonel Alcibiades DeBlanc on May 22, 1867, in Franklin, Louisiana. Author Christopher Long states, "Its members were pledged to support the supremacy of the White race, to oppose the amalgamation of the races, to resist the social and political encroachment of the so-called carpetbaggers, and to restore White control of the government". Historian Nicholas Lemann calls the Knights the leading terrorist organization in Louisiana. Their tactics (which included "harassment, floggings, and sometimes murder") "produced a reign of terror among the state's black population during the summer and fall of 1868." The estimated death toll of their terror campaign may have been as large as 1,800 people, with an even larger number being wounded by them. The double murder of pro-Republican Judge Valentine Chase and Sheriff Henry H. Pope of St. Mary Parish may have been committed by them.

Chapters primarily existed in the southern part of the Deep South. Historian George C. Rable notes "Although the Republicans saw evidence of a massive conspiracy in these outrages, in Louisiana as elsewhere, White terrorists were not organized beyond the local level." An additional aim of the group was to keep freedmen farm labor from leaving the plantations. Unlike the Ku Klux Klan which drew much of its membership from lower-class Southerners (primarily Confederate veterans), the White Camelia consisted mainly of upper-class Southerners, including physicians, landowners, newspaper editors, and officers. They were usually Confederate veterans, the upper part of antebellum society.

It began to decline, despite a convention in 1869. The more aggressive people joined the White League or similar paramilitary organizations that organized in the mid-1870s. By 1870, the original Knights of the White Camelia had mostly ceased to exist. Among its members was Louisiana Judge Taylor Beattie who led the Thibodaux massacre of 1887.

== Legacy ==
In 1939, Time reported that the Minnesotan anti-Semite George E. Deatherage was describing himself as the "national commander of the Knights of the White Camellia". In the 1990s, a Ku Klux Klan group based in eastern Texas adopted the name. According to the book Soldiers of God, the new age White Camelia has a strong influence in Vidor, Texas. Ever since the return of the White Camelia name, so-called "White Camelia" (sometimes spelled Kamelia) Klan groups have also emerged in Louisiana and Florida.

== See also ==
- Red Shirts
