= American Automobile Ass'n v. United States =

American Automobile Association v. United States
- Supreme Court of the United States

Argued April 17, 1961 Decided June 19, 1961
- Full case name: American Automobile Association v. United States
- Citations: 367 U.S. 687 (more) 81 S. Ct. 1727; 6 L. Ed. 2d 1109; 1961 U.S. LEXIS 2105; 61-2 U.S. Tax Cas. (CCH) P9517; 7 A.F.T.R.2d (RIA) 1618; 7 A.F.T.R.2d (RIA) 16118; 1961-2 C.B. 245

Case history
- Prior: Cert. to the Court of Claims

Holding
- The Commissioner of Internal Revenue did not abuse his discretion in determining that the prepaid dues were taxable as income in the year in which they were actually received and in rejecting the taxpayer's method of accounting.

Court membership
- Chief Justice Earl Warren Associate Justices Hugo Black · Felix Frankfurter; William O. Douglas · Tom C. Clark; John M. Harlan II · William J. Brennan Jr. Charles E. Whittaker · Potter Stewart

Case opinions
- Majority: Clark, joined by Warren, Black, Frankfurter, Brennan
- Dissent: Stewart, joined by Douglas, Harlan, Whittaker

Laws applied
- Internal Revenue Code § 41, § 455

American Automobile Association v. United States, 367 U.S. 687 (1961), was an income tax case before the United States Supreme Court.

== Background ==
=== Facts ===
For the taxable years 1952 and 1953, the American Automobile Association, an accrual-basis taxpayer, followed a method of accounting whereby annual membership dues collected in any month were treated as income 1/24 for the month received, 1/12 for each of the next 11 months, and 1/24 for the following month, a method which was in accord with generally accepted commercial accounting principles and which was consistent with the Association's over-all cost experience.

=== Tax return ===
The Commissioner of Internal Revenue determined not to accept the taxpayer's accounting system, and adjustments were made so as to reflect as gross income for each year the entire amount of membership dues actually received during the year. The Association paid the tax deficiencies resulting from the adjustments, and, after a timely claim for refund was denied, instituted suit to recover in the Court of Claims.

=== Court of claims ===
The court of claims sustained the Commissioner, finding that the national automobile club had failed to apply members' prepaid dues as taxable income in the calendar year of their actual receipt.

=== Certiorari ===
Petitioner claimed its accrual method of accounting was not artificial. The court granted certiorari to decide in what year its prepaid membership dues were taxable income.

== Opinion of the Court ==
The Supreme Court affirmed by Clark in a 5–4 decision.

It was held that the Commissioner of Internal Revenue did not abuse his discretion in determining that the prepaid dues were taxable as income in the year in which they were actually received and in rejecting the taxpayer's method of accounting.

It found that the accounting method employed by petitioner was in accord with generally accepted commercial accounting principles and practices, but could be rejected by the Commissioner of Internal Revenue in the exercise of his discretion under 26 U.S.C. § 41. In particular, petitioner's practice of accounting for expected future service expenses in advance could have been found purely artificial by the Commissioner. Furthermore, Congress had specifically authorized petitioner's desired method of accounting only in the instance of prepaid subscription income and had refused to enlarge 26 U.S.C. § 455 to include prepaid membership dues.

Thus, the exercise of the taxing authority in rejecting petitioner's accounting system was not unsound, in light of the discretion granted to the taxing authority by Congress. Moreover, Congress had refused to enlarge the use of petitioner's method of accounting beyond the area of prepaid subscription income in the field of publishing.

=== Dissents ===
Stewart dissented on the ground that the taxpayer was entitled to follow the accounting method adopted by it upon proof that its average costs of service in future periods reasonably matched dues allocated to such periods.

== See also ==
- Schlude v. Commissioner
- Artnell Company v. Commissioner
