= Arthur Allyn Jr. =

American baseball team owner (1913–1985)

- Born: December 24, 1913; Chicago, Illinois, U.S.
- Died: March 22, 1985 (aged 71); Sarasota, Florida, U.S.
- Known for: Co-owner of Chicago White Sox
- Relatives: John Allyn (brother)

Arthur Allyn Jr. (December 24, 1913 – March 22, 1985) was the co-owner of the Chicago White Sox of the American League with his brother John Allyn from 1961 through 1969. A few years after purchasing the franchise from Bill Veeck, Allyn tried to sell the team to a number of different parties, including Lamar Hunt and Bud Selig (who planned to move the team to Milwaukee, Wisconsin), before selling his share of the White Sox to his co-owner and brother John. Allyn also owned the Chicago Mustangs soccer club that was a charter member of the United Soccer Association in 1967. The Mustangs became part of the newly formed North American Soccer League the following year after merging with the NPSL.

Allyn was a lepidopterist who established the Allyn Museum of Entomology of which he had its assets and collections transferred to the University of Florida on 9 February 1981. Originally located in the Sarasota Bank and Trust Company Building from its inception in 1968 until its move to a new building next to Sarasota Jungle Gardens on 15 March 1973, the museum has been a part of the McGuire Center for Lepidoptera and Biodiversity since the facility opened in 2004.

== Personal life ==
Arthur Allyn graduated from Dartmouth College in 1935 and was a member of the Sigma Chi fraternity. He received the "Significant Sig" award from the fraternity in 1969.

== See also ==
- Artnell Company v. Commissioner
