= Junius Scales =

American labor leader (1920–2002)

Junius Scales (March 26, 1920 – August 5, 2002) was an American leader of the Communist Party of the United States of America notable for his arrest and conviction under the Smith Act in the 1950s. He was arrested in Memphis, Tennessee, in 1954 after going underground. His appeals lasted seven years and reached the Supreme Court twice. He began serving a six-year sentence at Lewisburg Federal Penitentiary in October 1961. On Christmas Eve 1962, President Kennedy commuted his sentence and he was released.

== Early life and career ==
Junius Irving Scales was born into a socially prominent family in Greensboro, North Carolina, in 1920. In 1935, he began hanging around 'The Intimate Bookshop' in Chapel Hill (run by Milton A. Abernethy and known to locals simply as Ab's), a barnlike off campus watering hole for local intellectuals and bohemians which had a clandestine Communist Party printing press in a back room. He was soon hired as a clerk in the store, and spent more time reading the books than working. He started attending the University of North Carolina at Chapel Hill the following year, at the age of 16, and three years later on his birthday in 1939, he secretly joined the Communist Party and, soon afterward, married his first wife, Vera, and quit school to become a union organizer in the textile mills. The attack on Pearl Harbor brought a sudden end to his union organizing efforts, and he volunteered for military service.

After serving in the U.S. Army from 1942 to 1946, he returned to Chapel Hill. While completing work on his bachelor's degree and starting work on his master's, he became the local party organizer, supervising five local Communist clubs and hosting weekly salons at his home that were open to both party and non-party members. In 1948, he became state chairman of the party. At this time he openly and publicly identified himself as the Communist Party leader in North Carolina, leading to newspaper stories which embarrassed his wealthy family and led to his forced resignation from his post on the state committee of the Southern Conference on Human Welfare. The strain on his marriage led to his divorce. He married his second wife, Gladys, a New Yorker, in 1950. Their only child, Barbara, was born in Durham in April 1951.

Scales went semi-underground ("unavailable", in party parlance, but not in the "deep freeze") in 1951, traveling from city to city under a variety of assumed names as a circuit riding district organizer for the CP in North and South Carolina, Tennessee, Virginia and northern Mississippi, making unannounced visits to small party clubs meeting in private homes where he would collect dues, reregister members, settle disputes and explain the latest shifts in the party line. His wife moved back to New York, where she lived under an alias in the Bronx with her mother and their infant daughter, with Junius making carefully guarded visits to his family only at infrequent intervals. The FBI periodically caught up to him and trailed him during these years, but did not arrest him until 1954. He was not charged with any overt acts, but was indicted under the provisions of the Smith Act as a member of an organization which advocated violence. He became the only party member to serve in prison on these charges, similar charges against Claude Lightfoot having been dropped on appeal. While free on bail while appealing his conviction, Scales remained as state chairman of the CP until 1956, when he denounced the Soviet invasion of Hungary. After a brief association with the dissident John Gates faction he quit the Communist Party in 1957, following Nikita Khrushchev's revelations of Stalin-era atrocities.

== Arrest and conviction ==
His arrest by the FBI on a street corner in Memphis in 1954 was the beginning of a seven-year legal ordeal, in which he was represented by prominent lawyer Telford Taylor and North Carolina civil rights attorney McNeill Smith. Scales lost his final appeal, Scales v. United States, in the United States Supreme Court on a 5–4 decision. He served 15 months of a six-year sentence at Lewisburg Penitentiary in Pennsylvania before President John F. Kennedy commuted his sentence on Christmas Eve, 1962, after a vigorous campaign for clemency led by James Wechsler of the New York Post and Norman Thomas. Martin Luther King Jr., Reinhold Neibuhr, and W. H. Auden were among the notables who signed a petition on his behalf.

After his release, he settled in New York and was hired as a proofreader at The New York Times, having fought off an attempt to expel him from the typographers union on the basis of his conviction in 1961. A play, "The Limits of Dissent", by University of North Carolina Professor Lou Lipsitz, based on his trial transcript, was produced in collaboration with the Winston-Salem School of the Arts and toured the stated courthouses in collaboration with the ACLU. His memoirs, "Cause At Heart: A Former Communist Remembers", written with his closest friend, Richard Nickson, published by the University of Georgia Press, appeared in 1987. A paperback edition with new introductions by scholars Vernon Burton and James R. Barrett appeared in 2005. "Cause At Heart" was issued as an e-book by Plunkett Lake Press in 2018. A book based on interviews conducted in 1971, by Mickey Friedman, was published as "A Red Family" in 2007.

He lived in Pine Bush, New York, until illness hospitalized him; he died in New York City on August 5, 2002.

His papers are archived at the library of the University of North Carolina in Chapel Hill.
