= Chicago Mustangs =

Chicago Mustangs may refer to either of two professional soccer teams:

- Chicago Mustangs (1967–68), in the United Soccer Association and North American Soccer League from 1967 to 1968
- Chicago Mustangs (2012–present), a Major Arena Soccer League team that began play in 2012
