= John Allyn =

American baseball executive

Personal information
- Born: May 17, 1917 Chicago, Illinois
- Died: April 29, 1979 (aged 61) Winnetka, Illinois
- Occupation(s): Co-owner, Chicago White Sox
- Relative: Arthur Allyn, Jr. (Brother)

Sport
- Sport: Baseball
- League: Major League Baseball
- Club: Chicago White Sox

John Allyn (May 17, 1917 – April 29, 1979) was the co-owner of the Chicago White Sox of the American League with his brother Arthur Allyn, Jr. from 1961 through 1969, and sole principal owner from 1969 through 1975. In addition, John Allyn served as president of the Chicago Mustangs soccer team which he co-owned with his brother, Arthur. In 1975, Allyn sold the club back to the person he and his brother had purchased it from in 1961, Bill Veeck.
