= Claude Lightfoot =

American politician

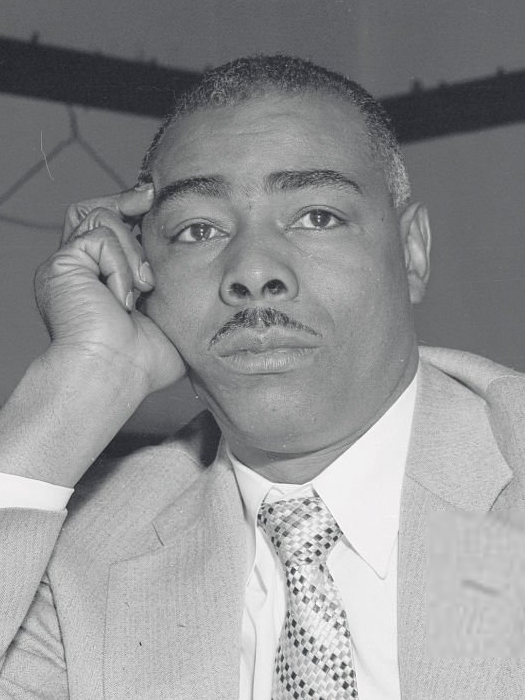
- Lightfoot in 1955
- Born: January 19, 1910; Lake Village, Arkansas, U.S.
- Died: July 17, 1991 (aged 81); Gary, Indiana, U.S.
- Education: Virginia Union University
- Political party: Communist Party USA
- Spouse(s): Geraldyne Gray (m. 1938; died 1962) Joyce (m. 1965)
- Children: 2 (adopted)
- Relatives: Oliver Law (brother-in-law)

Claude M. Lightfoot (January 19, 1910 – July 17, 1991) was an African American activist, politician, and author. From 1957 until his death in 1991 Lightfoot was a functionary of the Communist Party USA (CPUSA) and was several times the nominee of that party for public office. The author of many books and articles about racism and communism, Lightfoot also traveled and lectured throughout the world.

On June 26, 1954, during the McCarthy era, Lightfoot was arrested based on the Smith Act of 1940 and put on trial. While previous Smith Act indictments had been of individuals accused directly of attempting to overthrow the US government by force or violence, Lightfoot was indicted merely for being a member of the Communist Party, which, in turn, was alleged to be attempting to overthrow the government. His conviction in January 1955 was appealed all the way to the U.S. Supreme Court, which reversed the conviction (355 U.S. 2 (1957)), resulting in Lightfoot's acquittal in 1961.

== Early life ==
Claude M. Lightfoot was born on January 19, 1910, in Lake Village, Arkansas. Soon after his birth his parents left him to be cared for by his grandmother, Frances Henderson Lightfoot, A former slave who managed to acquire a large cotton farm in Lake Village. Claude lived with his grandmother for the first six years of his life before moving to Little Rock, Arkansas to be with his parents. In Little Rock, the living conditions were much worse than they had been on his grandmother's farm in Lake Village. His parents struggled to put food on the table, a major factor contributing their decision to move north to Chicago's South Side in 1917. Other members of his family began to migrate north and by the following year his entire family had settled in Chicago.

In Chicago, Lightfoot began to develop his interest in politics. This is also the period where he began to realize more fully the disadvantaged position that African Americans occupy in society. He noted that despite the popular notion that racism in the North did not compare with racism in the south, Lightfoot noticed that as an African-American, Jim Crow would follow him wherever he went. During this time in his life, Lightfoot became drawn to Marcus Garvey and black nationalism. At this time he believed in black capitalism, and the idea that African Americans should form their own economy separate from the economy run by the whites and exploiting blacks. A few of the things that drew Lightfoot to Garvey were the poor treatment of African American veterans coming back from World War One, the Chicago race riot of 1919, as well as other members of his family who were also attracted to Garvey's ideas.

Lightfoot's formal education came to an end when he was forced to drop out of high school in order to help make money for his family. With the exception of spending one year at Virginia Union University in Richmond the rest of his education would be self taught.

=== Becoming a communist ===
Lightfoot continued to believe in Marcus Garvey's black nationalist vision into his twenties. While in his twenties he joined the Democratic party breaking from his previous alliance with the Republican party which he had previously identified with due to its reputation as the party of Abraham Lincoln. In 1930 he helped to form the Young Men's Black Democratic Club. He continued to work towards improving the living conditions of African Americans through economic enrichment.

During the Great Depression Lightfoot became disillusioned with the Democratic Party and with the idea of capitalism as a whole. He came to the conclusion that African Americans could never achieve true equality within the capitalist system as it is controlled by whites and even through black capitalism African Americans would still be reliant on the white business moguls above them. Because of this, Lightfoot concluded that the best way to achieve racial equality in America is through abandoning capitalism and creating an equal society through communism.

== Political career ==
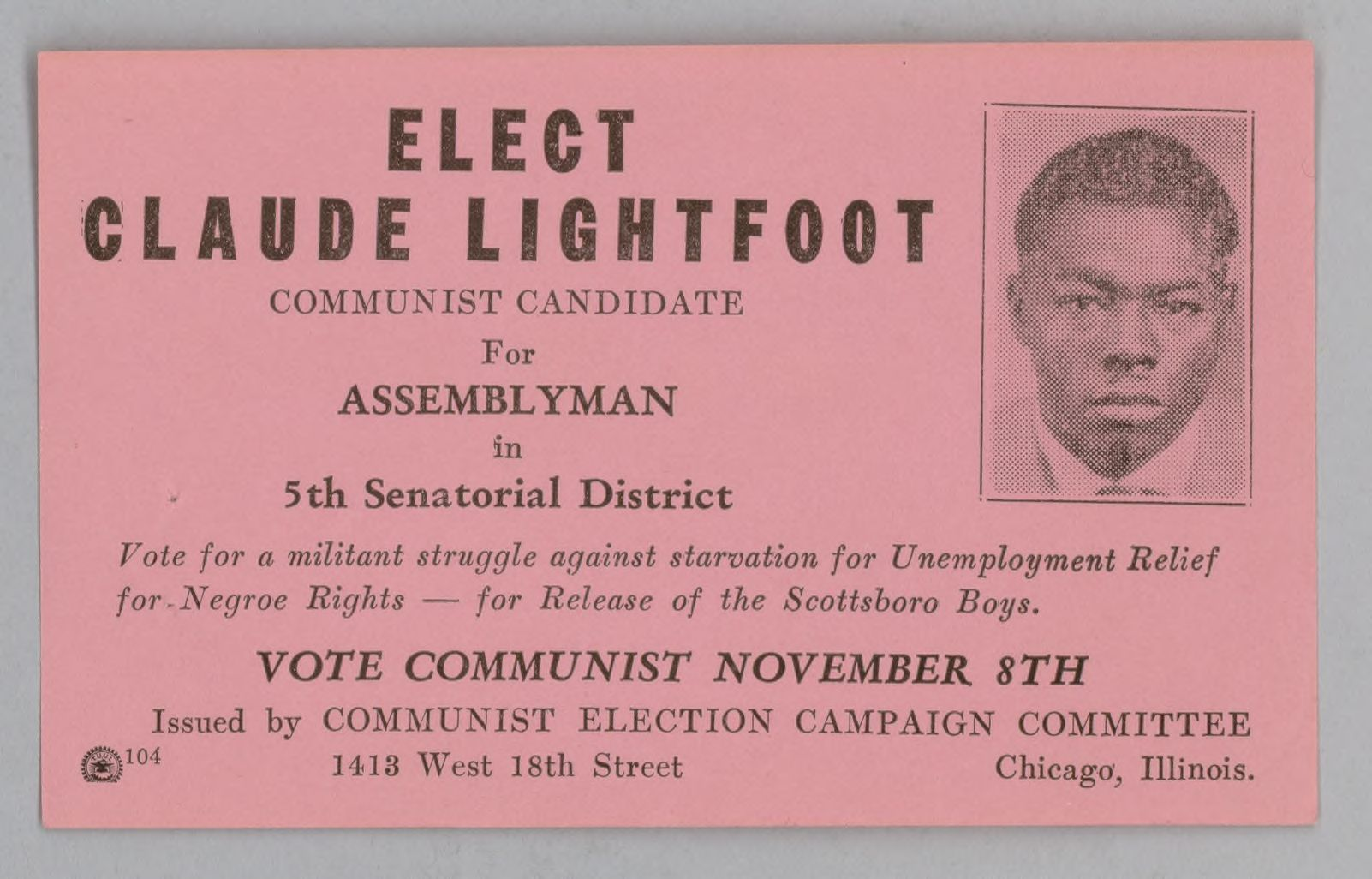
Flyer promoting Lightfoot's candidacy for the Illinois General Assembly, 1932

Lightfoot officially became a member of the Communist Party USA in the summer of 1931. In 1932 he ran for Illinois State Senate on the Communist Party ticket and received a total of 33,000 votes. In 1935, Lightfoot traveled to the Soviet Union as a delegate to the 7th World Congress of the Comintern. In 1936, he was the Communist Party nominee for Illinois Attorney General. A staunch communist by this point, Lightfoot originally opposed American intervention in World War II. However, he changed his opinion upon the Nazi invasion of the Soviet Union, becoming a strong supporter of the war and joining the U.S. Army, serving for three and a half years.

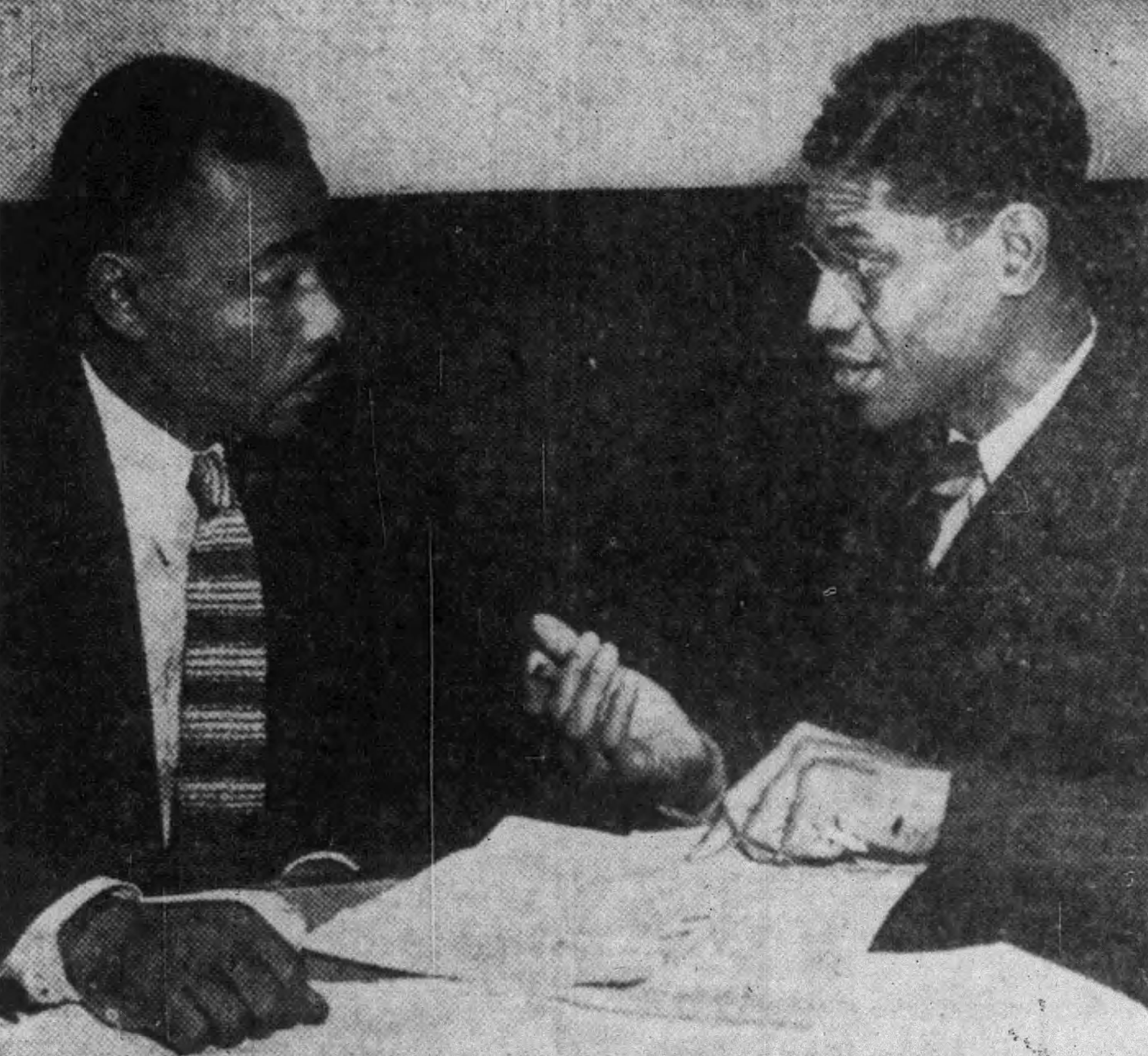
Lightfoot (left) and Abner Berry, competing for Daily Worker subscriptions in Chicago's South Side and Harlem, respectively, October 4, 1941

Upon returning from the war Lightfoot's belief in communism had only deepened. His time in the army had reinforced his belief that the American political institutions were corrupt and racist. In 1946 he made another run for Illinois state senate in the communist party. His candidacy was faced with intense opposition from the local democratic party who feared that his popular support in the black community would split the liberal vote and lead to a republican winning the election. However, on election day Lightfoot's popular support did not translate to the ballot box as he only recorded around 1,000 votes. Lightfoot believed that the Democratic party had meddled with the election and while this was entirely possible he had no proof to back up his claim.

After his loss in 1946, Lightfoot shifted his focus towards promoting other African American candidates for office to fight against racism and oppression. Initially he and his allies attempted to lobby the Democratic party to nominate more black candidates for office. When these attempts were ignored they shifted their focus to running their own black candidates on their own third party progressive ticket. Within this plan, Lightfoot was tasked with organizing the South Side. Lightfoot's efforts in the area were a major success despite the fact that they did not win an election, they were able to win most of the black neighborhoods in the area.

1948 was a presidential election year and due to his lack of support for civil rights, and his hostile position towards the Soviet Union and communists in general, Lightfoot and other communists did not support Democratic incumbent Harry Truman's reelection campaign. Instead they opted to put their support behind Franklin Roosevelt's first vice president Henry Wallace who was running on the progressive party ticket. While Wallace was not a communist he did not reject the support of communists like most Democrats. Wallace also displayed a commitment to civil rights which was unlike that of the major party candidates. Wallace opposed Jim Crow laws and refused to speak in front of segregated audiences in the south. Much like in 1947, Lightfoot's efforts did not translate to votes and Harry Truman won the presidential election in a tight race over Republican Thomas Dewey.

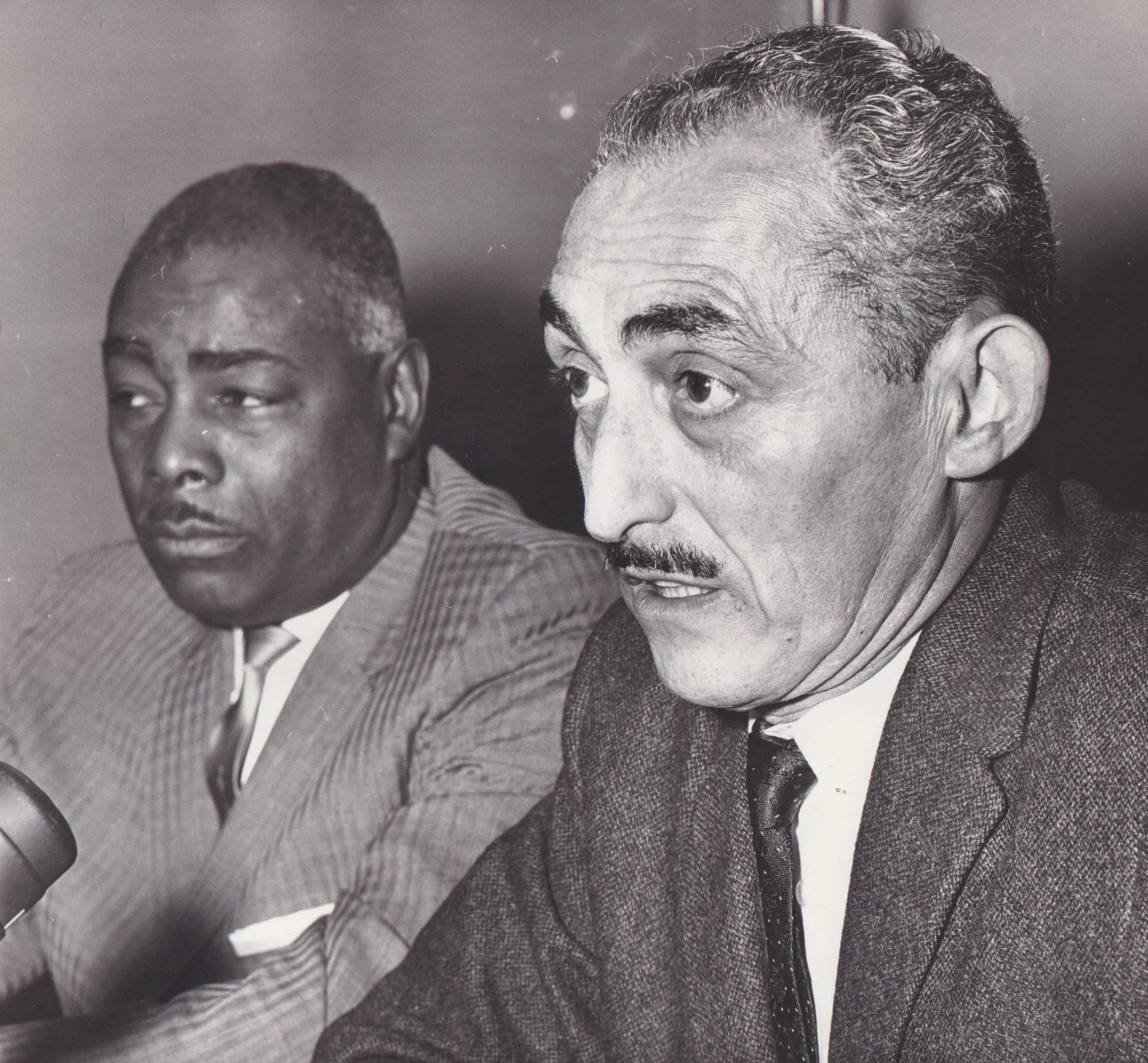
Lightfoot and Gil Green speak at a press conference, November 6, 1963

Following Wallace's loss in the 1948 elections, Lightfoot became more involved in the Communist Party. In 1949 he was elected Organizational secretary for the Illinois Communist Party. At this point in time, the president of the Illinois Communist party Gil Green was fighting federal indictment under the Smith Act of 1940, which criminalizes any act advocating for the overthrow of the US government by force or violence, a law which Lightfoot himself would become very familiar with in the future. Upon conviction his conviction in 1957, Green was forced to give up the presidency of the party and Lightfoot took over the Illinois Communist Party under the title of Executive Secretary.

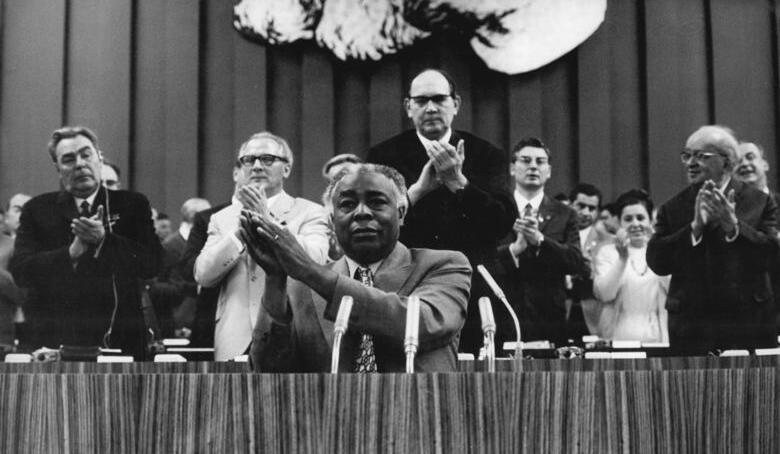
Lightfoot at the 8th SED Party Conference, June 17, 1971

While embroiled in the appeal process for his Smith Act conviction, Lightfoot continued to be an active participant in the Communist Party. In 1958, while still serving as leader of the Illinois communist party, Lightfoot was elected to the national executive committee of the Party whose leadership had been decimated by Smith Act convictions. Lightfoot would remain a dedicated servant to the national communist party for the rest of his life.

== Legal battles ==
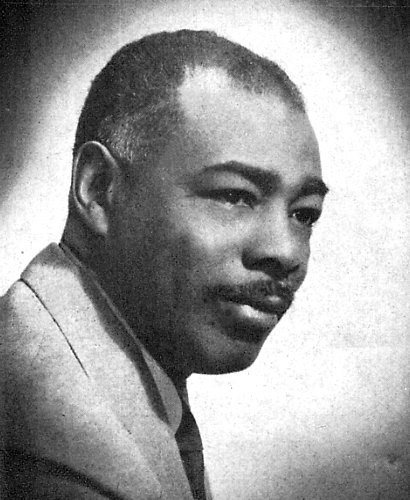
Lightfoot c. 1955

Upon taking control of the Illinois Communist Party, he and the party immediately began to face legal threats. The first threat was a legislative one in the form of a bill in the Illinois state senate which if passed, would have effectively outlawed the Illinois Communist Party. In March 1951 Lightfoot went to the Illinois senate to testify against the bill and ended up being held in contempt of the Senate due to his fiery disposition. After this incident, the Bill's sponsor, Senator Paul Broyles demanded to governor Adlai Stevenson and Attorney General Ivan Elliot to have Lightfoot arrested, but they did not comply at this point in time. The bill did not end up being passed but this would only mark the beginning of his fight against unjust laws.

In the late 1940s and early 1950s communist leaders across the country were being arrested and convicted around the country for violating the Smith Act. Because of this, in 1951 Lightfoot decided to go underground to hide from the law. After three years underground his run from the law ended when he was arrested by federal authorities on June 26, 1954. Like the other communists leaders arrested he was charged under the Smith Act, however his case differed from all under previous cases in that he was arrested under the "membership clause" of the act whereas all other previous indictments were for "conspiring to teach the overthrow of the government by force and violence". This means that Lightfoot was being charged simply for being a member of a political party which for the rest of its existence was completely legal.

At Lightfoot's arraignment his bail was originally set at an exorbitant $50,000. Standard bail for an offense like his was around $5,000. Eventually Judge Joseph Sam Perry lowered the number to $30,000, still an incredibly high number. Perry also expressed his bias against the defendant during the bail hearing. Incredibly, Lightfoot's wife, Geraldyne was able to come up with the money to get him out. Lightfoot's trial began on January 11, 1955. Arguments against Lightfoot posited that the purpose of the communist party is to conduct an overthrow of the United States government and that they teach that violence is the means by which this would be accomplished. Witnesses spoke against Lightfoot claiming that he and the communist party as a whole aimed to conduct a violent revolution against the federal government and that violent revolution was one of the main tents that Lightfoot taught at communist party training schools. The defense refuted these claims and argued that the goal of the Communist Party was to establish "American socialism thru gradual and peaceful processes". However they did admit that at some points in history such as our own civil war, the majority has been forced to resort to violent means in order to accomplish the changes that they deem necessary. However they maintained that this was not the preferred route for the Communist Party. On January 26, the jury found Lightfoot guilty of violating the membership clause of the Smith Act and he was sentenced to 5 years in prison and a $10,000 fine. Immediately after the trial his lawyers called for a new trial and if that were not granted they stated their intention to appeal the verdict. Because he was appealing the case Lightfoot was allowed to remain out of prison until a final verdict would be delivered.

While appealing his case, Lightfoot actively campaigned the public to back him up in his cause. In 1955, he published the transcript of a speech he gave called "Not Guilty!". In this speech he laid out the injustices of the Smith Act and his conviction under the membership clause. He asserts that his conviction of being guilty by association sets a dangerous precedent for all Americans. He argues that if this precedent is upheld in the higher courts, it would allow the justice department to expand its "powerful machinery of oppression" over a much greater proportion of the population. He notes that in the Communist Control Act of 1954 there are 14 different ways laid out to determine whether a person is a communist including, "anyone who has made a financial contribution in any form" to a communist party, anyone who has "conferred with officers or members, and anyone who "cooperates in carrying out the aims of the organization". In the speech he argues that his membership to the communist party and his efforts to fight for a better, more equal society by fighting what he sees as an unjust power structure is in fact a patriotic act as he is exercising his political freedom just as many American heroes had done before him.

Lightfoot's appeal of the verdict was initially shot down by the U.S. court of appeals on January 20, 1956. After this he announced that he would call for a rehearing in a lower court and if this failed he would appeal the verdict to the U.S. Supreme Court. Two months after this, his appeal was granted by the court of appeals. In October 1957 the seventh circuit court of appeals reversed the ruling on the technicality that the defense did not have access to the FBI reports which were used as evidence against Lightfoot in the trial. This ruling triggered a retrial which would be repeatedly delayed until 1961 when, due to new standards of proof and rules on evidence, on November 15, 1961, the United States Federal government was forced to drop the charges against Lightfoot. They conceded that their evidence was insufficient to prove that Lightfoot had either "knowledge of the party’s advocacy of the violent overthrow of the Government, or personally advocated it". For the first time in almost seven years the threat of imprisonment was no longer hanging of Lightfoot's head.

== Later life ==
In the 1970s Lightfoot wrote newspaper columns for the Chicago Courier. In 1973 he received an honorary doctorate from the University of Rostock in East Germany for his book Racism and Human Survival: Lessons of Nazi Germany for Today's World. He was also honored by the W.E.B. DuBois Clubs of America and the Bulgarian and Soviet Communist parties.

== Personal life ==
Lightfoot married Geraldyne Gray in 1938. She was a CPUSA organizer who died of cancer in 1962; they adopted a disabled son, Earl, around 1955. Lightfoot married a woman named Joyce in 1965 and adopted a daughter named Tanya. He donated his papers to the Chicago Historical Museum in 1986.

Lightfoot's autobiography, which was also his doctoral thesis at the University of Illinois, is From Chicago's Ghetto to World Politics: The Life and Struggles of Claude M. Lightfoot. It was first published as Black America and the World Revolution (New York: New Outlook Publishers, 1970). A 1980 augmented edition was titled Chicago Slums to World Politics.

== Daily World gallery ==
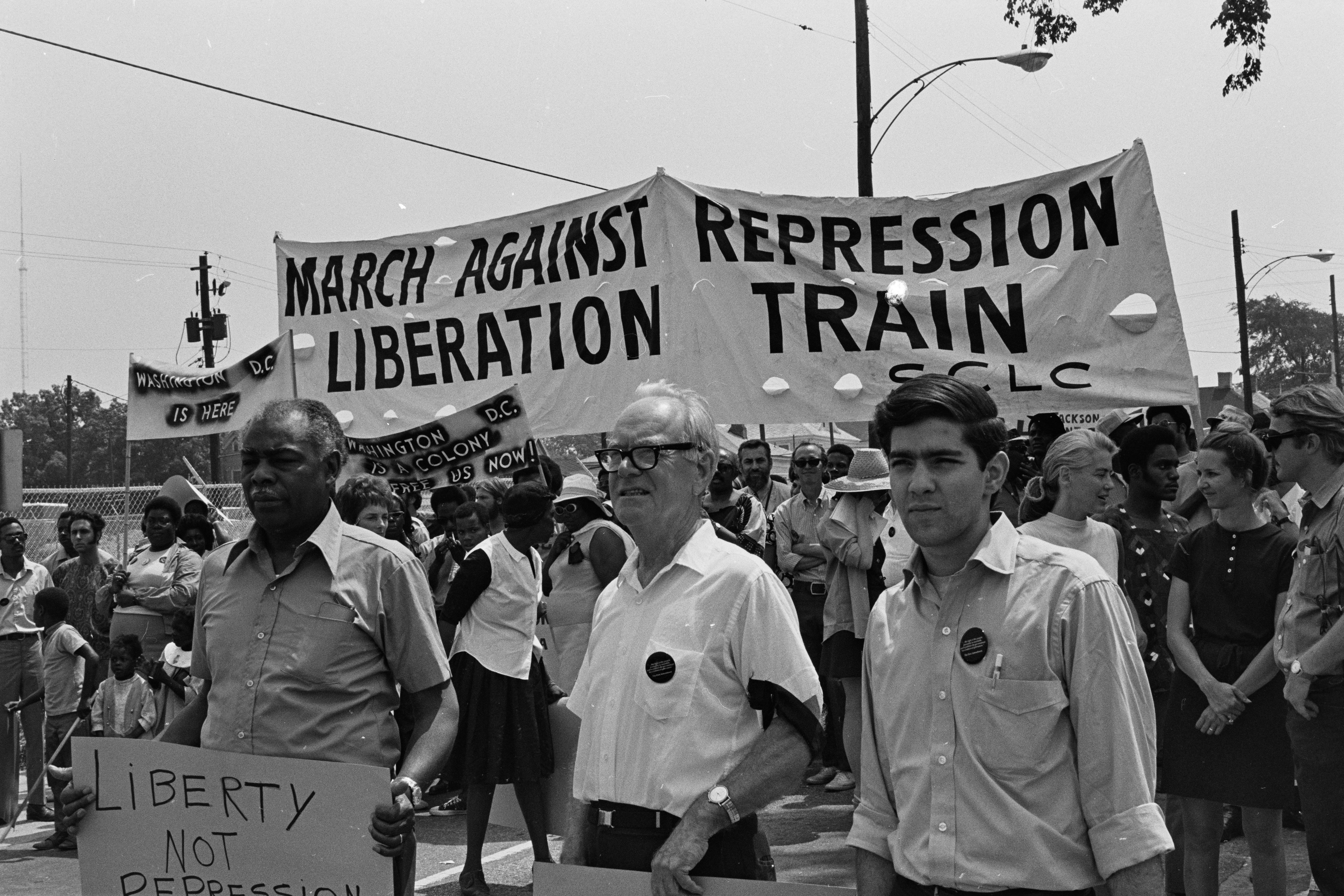
At the March Against Repression in Atlanta, Georgia, May 23, 1970

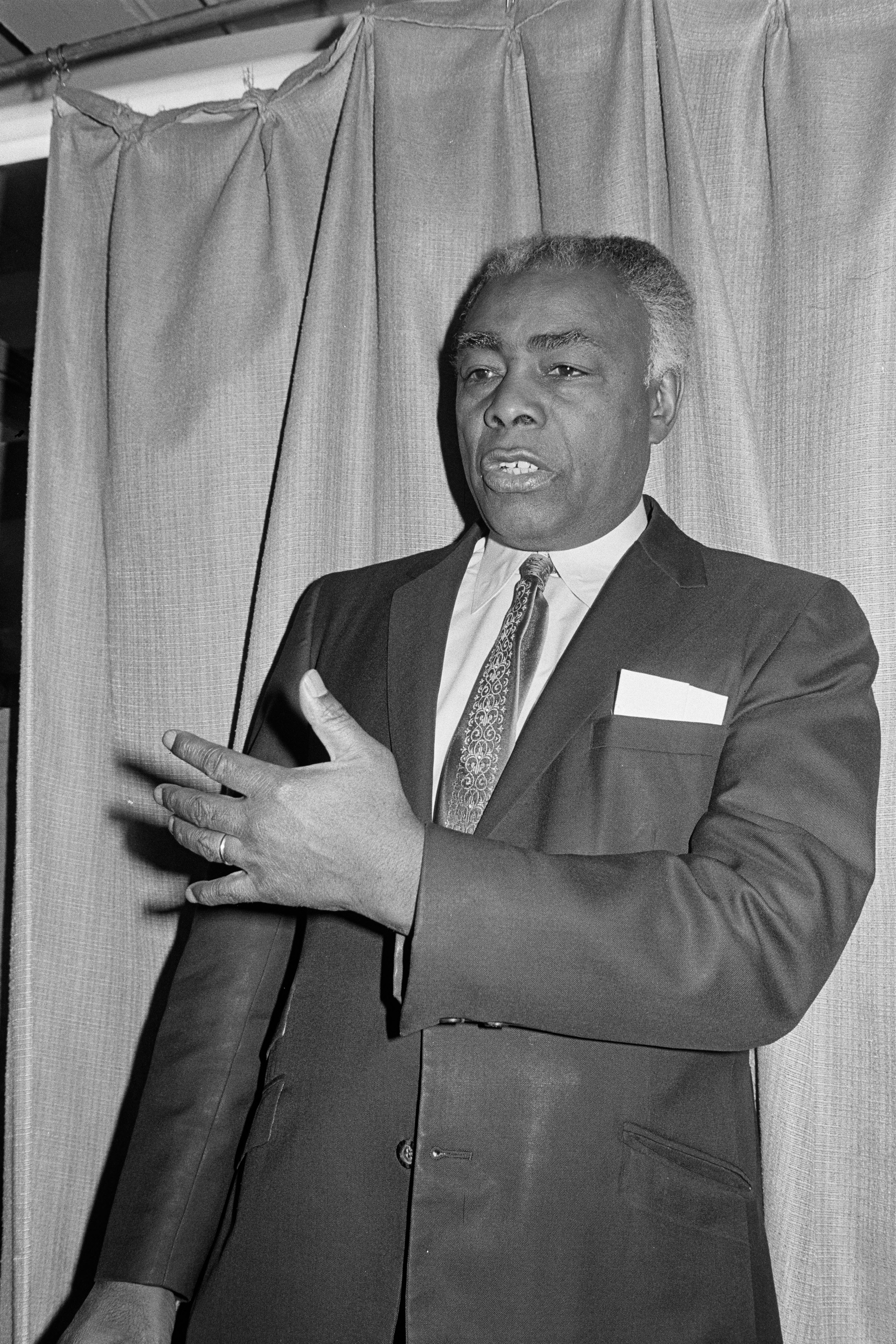
At the Daily World office, April 16, 1971

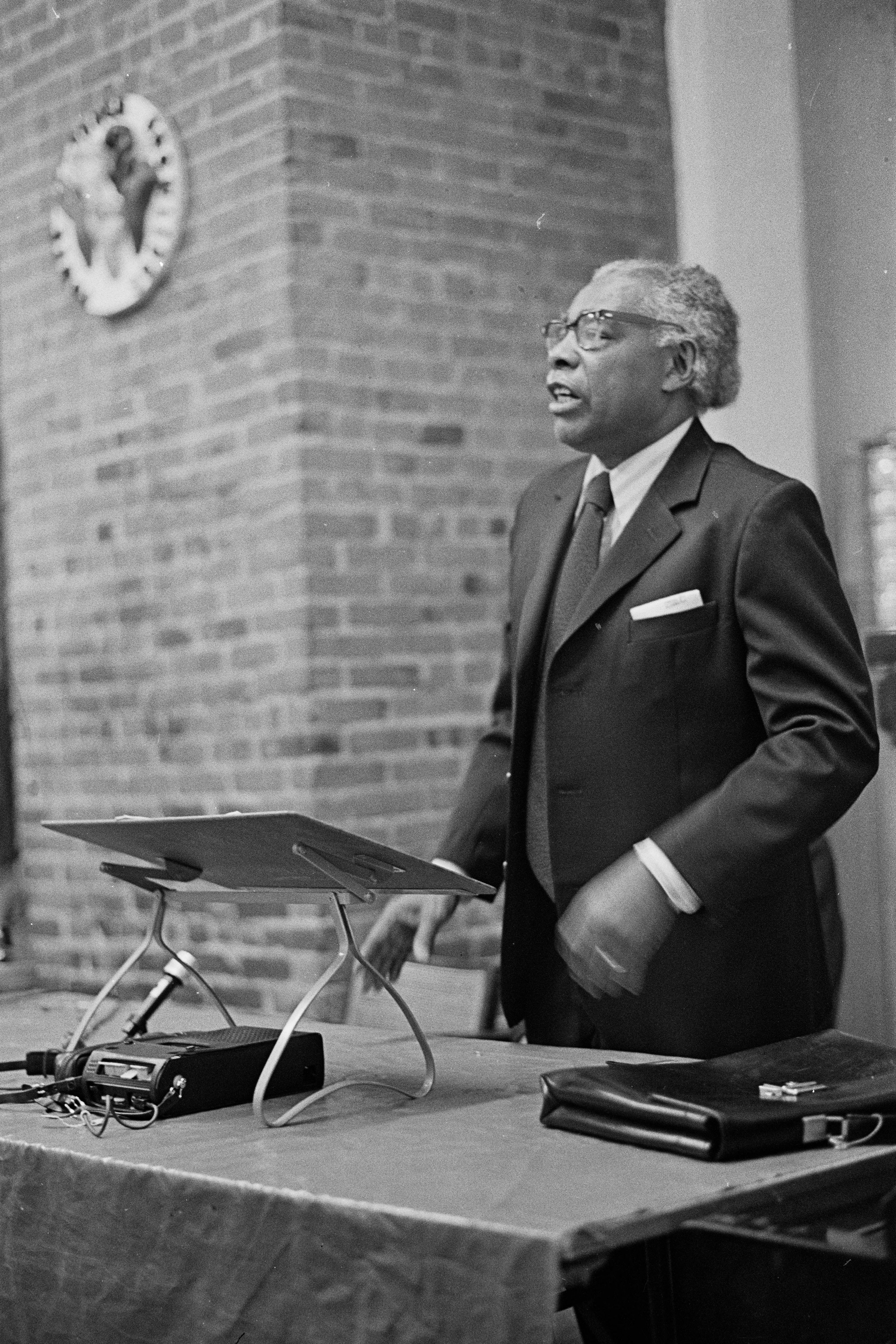
At the Harlem Institute of Marxist Studies, November 24, 1972

== Works ==
- An American looks at Russia: Can we live together in peace? (New York: New Century Publishers, 1951), 23 pp.
- "Not guilty!" The Case of Claude Lightfoot, by Claude M. Lightfoot (New York: New Century Publishers, 1955), 15pp. (Based on a speech delivered Mar. 26, 1955 in Los Angeles, Calif.)
- The Struggle to End the Cold War at Home (New York: New Century Publishers, 1956). (Reprinted from Political Affairs, September, 1955)
- The Challenge of the '56 elections (New York: New Century Publishers, 1956), 24 pp. (Report to the National Committee of the Communist Party)
- The Negro Question in the U.S.A. (New York: New Century Publishers, 1960). (Address to the 17th National Convention of the Communist Party, USA)
- Turning Point in Freedom Road: The fight to end Jim Crow now (New York: New Century Publishers, 1962), 46 pp.
- "Building a Negro and White alliance for progress," in: Negro liberation: A Goal for all Americans, by Henry Winston Winston, Gus Hall, Claude M Lightfoot and William L Patterson (New York: New Currents Publishers, 1964).
- "The Path to Negro Freedom," World Marxist Review, VIII, no. 10 (October 1965), pp. 20–29.
- Black power and liberation: A communist view (New York: New Outlook Publishers, 1967), 46 pp.
- Ghetto Rebellion to Black Liberation (New York: International Publishers, 1968), 192 pp.
- O poder negro em revolta (Río de Janeiro: Paz e Terra, 1969). (Portuguese translation of Ghetto Rebellion to black liberation)
- "Black liberation in a socialist, Asian and African perspective," in: Some aspects of the Black liberation struggle: Two lectures, by William Patterson and Claude Lightfoot (Black Liberation Commission, Communist Party, United States of America, 1969). (lecture delivered at Fisk University on October 15, 1969, at a Moratorium Day Rally to End the War in Vietnam)
- The Civil War and black liberation today (New York: New Outlook Publishers, 1969), 45 p.
- Racism and human survival: Lessons of Nazi Germany for today's world (New York, International Publishers, 1972), 287 pp. illus.
- Vosstanija v getto za osvobozzdenie negrov (Moscow: Izd. Progress, 1972).
- The Effect of education on racism: The two German states and the USA (New York, New Outlook, 1973).
- Der Kampf für die Befreiung der Afroamerikaner (Berlin: Dietz, 1973), 216 pp. (translation of Ghetto rebellion to black liberation)
- Human rights U.S. style: From colonial times through the New Deal (New York: International Publishers, 1977), 229 pages.
- Salute to Black history honoring Dr. Claude Lightfoot (Salsedo Press, Chicago: 1979), pamphlet.
- Chicago Slums to world politics: Autobiography of Claude M. Lightfoot (New York: New Outlook, 1980), 226 pp, illus. (with Timothy V Johnson)
- "A New Outlook on Life," in: Political Affairs 71:2(February 1992), 18–25.
