= Subversive activities registration =

Subversive activities registration is sometimes required by governments.

== Registration in the United States ==
18 U.S.C. § 2386, requires the registration of any private group engaged in "civilian military activity" or in "political activity", the latter being defined as "any activity the purpose or aim of which, or one of the purposes or aims of which, is the control by force or overthrow of the Government of the United States or a political subdivision thereof, or any State or political subdivision thereof."

The statute requires that such groups provide detailed information on their leaders, meeting places, assets, publications, etc. All of these statements become public records open to public examination and inspection.

=== South Carolina ===
South Carolina passed a Subversive Activities Registration Act which required people to pay a five dollar fee to register as "subversive agents". No one registered until February 2010, when the legislation was publicized on the internet and by radio. Fourteen people registered before the act was repealed in June 2010.

Registered subversives include Cognition Capital Management (CCM), a registered investment advisor founded by Mitch Hardy and Bill Matson, the co-authors of Data Driven Investing. By its compliance with the Subversive Activities Registration Act, CCM sought to protest the ongoing unfair business practices of Wall Street firms with significant federal government ownership.

== See also ==
- Communist Registration Act
- Criminal anarchy
