= Anti-Propaganda Act of 1940 (US) =

1940 United States law

- Long title: An Act to require the registration of certain organizations carrying on activities within the United States, and for other purposes.
- Acronyms (colloquial): VAPA
- Nicknames: Voorhis Anti-Propaganda Act
- Enacted by: the 76th United States Congress
- Effective: January 14, 1941

Citations
- Public law: Pub. L. 76–870
- Statutes at Large: 54 Stat. 1201, Chap. 897

Codification
- Titles amended: 18: Crimes and Criminal Procedure
- U.S.C. sections created: 18 U.S.C. ch. 115 § 2386

Legislative history
- Introduced in the House as H.R. 10094 by Jerry Voorhis (D–CA) on July 1, 1940; Signed into law by President Franklin D. Roosevelt on October 17, 1940

Anti-Propaganda Act of 1940 or Voorhis Anti-Propaganda Act is a United States statute requiring the registration of organizations subject to foreign control while accomplishing activities in the United States. The public law was penned amidst the economic contraction of 1930s reasonably considering the developments of American imperialism, American Organized Labor, Nazism in the Americas, and propaganda in the United States. The Act of Congress was declared during the mid-twentieth century clandestine political movements in the United States often known as the Popular Front of 1930s.

During the 1930s, the public policy of the United States attested to the ascent of modern liberalism while conservatism in the United States was marginalized with the propagation of Franklin Roosevelt's New Deal persuasively bolstered by the New Deal coalition.

The U.S. House bill 10094 was sponsored by California congressman Jerry Voorhis who introduced the legislation to the United States House of Representatives on July 1, 1940. The United States federal law was passed by the 76th United States Congress and enacted into law by the 32nd President of the United States Franklin Roosevelt on October 17, 1940.

== Declarations of Congressional Act ==
The Chapter 897 article found in volume fifty-four of the Statutes at Large was unanimously adopted to oppose the populism and propaganda of the fifth column auspiciously accomplishing a departure from the propaganda of the deed.

The American patriotism slip law was preceded by the McCormack Act of 1938 and the Hatch Act of 1939 while consecutively substantiated with the Smith Act of 1940.

The Voorhis Act of 1940 was authored as six sections authorizing the judicial observations of organizations pursuing activities in the United States susceptible of subject to foreign controls as determined as a foreign relations of the United States.

- Registration of Certain Organizations – 54 Stat. 1201 § I
  - Definitions
    - Attorney General – United States Attorney General
    - Organization – Any group, club, league, society, committee, association, political party, or combination of individuals
    - Political Activity – Any activity given the purpose or aim of which is the control by force or overthrow the Government – Coup d'état – of the United States or a political subdivision or any State or political subdivision
    - Civilian Military Activity
      1. it gives instruction to, or prescribes instruction for, its members in the use of firearms or other weapons or any substitute therefor, or military or naval science
      2. it receives from any other organization or from any individual instruction in military or naval science
      3. it engages in any military or naval maneuvers or activities
      4. it engages, either with or without arms, in drills or parades of a military or naval character
      5. it engages in any other form of organized activity which in the opinion of the Attorney General constitutes preparation for military action
    - Subject to Foreign Control
      - An organization shall be deemed subject to foreign control when
        1. It solicits or accepts financial contributions, loans, or support of any kind, directly or indirectly, from, or is affiliated directly or indirectly with, a foreign government or a political subdivision thereof, or an agent, agency, or instrumentality of a foreign government or political subdivision thereof, or a political party in a foreign country, or an international political organization
        2. Its policies, or any of them, are determined by or at the suggestion of, or in collaboration with, a foreign government or political subdivision thereof, or an agent, agency, or instrumentality of a foreign government or a political subdivision thereof, or a political party in a foreign country, or an international political organization
- Organizations Required to Register – 54 Stat. 1202–1203 § II
  - Organizations shall be required to register with the Attorney General
    1. Every organization subject to foreign control which engages in political activity
    2. Every organization which engages both in civilian military activity and political activity
    3. Every organization subject to foreign control which engages in civilian military activity
    4. Every organization, the purpose or aim of which, or one of the purposes or aims of which, is the establishment control, conduct seizure, or overthrow of a government or subdivision by the use of force, violence, military measures, or threats of any one or more of the foregoing
  - Manner of Registration – Every such organization shall register by filing with the Attorney General, on such forms and in such detail as the rules and regulations prescribe, a registration statement containing the information and documents prescribed and shall within thirty days after the expiration of each period of six months succeeding the filing of such registration statement
  - Filing of Supplemental Statements – Attorney General may by rules and regulations prescribe, a supplemental statement containing such information and documents as may be necessary to make the information and documents previously filed accurate and current with respect to such preceding six months' period. Every statement required to be filed shall be subscribed, under oath, by all of the officers of the organization
  - Exemptions – Nothing shall be deemed to require registration or the filing of any statement with the Attorney General
    1. The armed forces of the United States
    2. The organized militia or National Guard of any States, Territory, District, or possession of the United States
    3. Any law-enforcement agency of the United States or of any Territory, District, or possession thereof, or of any State or political subdivision of a State, or of any agency or instrumentality of one or more States
    4. Any duly established diplomatic mission or consular office of a foreign government which is so recognized by the Department of State
    5. Any nationally recognized organization of persons who are veterans of the armed forces of the United States, or affiliates of such organizations
  - Registration Statement Contents –
    - Every registration statement required to be filed by any organization shall contain the following information and documents
      1. The name and post-office address of the organization in the United States, and the names and addresses of all branches, chapters, and affiliates of such organization
      2. The name, address, and nationality of each officer, and of each person who performs the functions of an officer, of the organization, and of each branch, chapter, and affiliate of the organization
      3. The qualifications for membership in the organization
      4. The existing and proposed aims and purposes of the organization, and all the means by which these aims or purposes are being attained or are to be attained
      5. The address or addresses of meeting places of the organization, and of each branch, chapter, or affiliate of the organization, and the times of meetings
      6. The name and address of each person who has contributed any money, dues, property, or other thing of value to the organization or to any branch, chapter, or affiliate of the organization
      7. A detailed statement of the assets of the organization, and of each branch, chapter, and affiliate of the organization, the manner in which such assets were acquired, and a detailed statement of the liabilities and income of the organization and of each branch, chapter, and affiliate of the organization
      8. A detailed description of the activities of the organization, and of each chapter, branch, and affiliate of the organization
      9. A description of the uniforms, badges, insignia, or other means of identification prescribed by the organization, and worn or carried by its officers or members, or any of such officers or members
      10. A copy of each book, pamphlet, leaflet, or other publication or item of written, printed, or graphic matter issued or distributed directly or indirectly by the organization, or by any chapter, branch, or affiliate of the organization, or by any of the members of the organization under its authority or within its knowledge, together with the name of its author or authors and the name and address of the publisher
      11. A description of all firearms or other weapons owned by the organization, or by any chapter, branch, or affiliate of the organization, identified by the manufacturer's number thereon
      12. In case the organization is subject to foreign control, the manner in which it is so subject
      13. A copy of the charter, articles of association, constitution, bylaws, rules, regulations, agreements, resolutions, and all other instruments relating to the organization, powers, and purposes of the organization and to the powers of the officers of the organization and of each chapter, branch, and affiliate of the organization
      14. Such other information and documents pertinent to the purposes of this Act as the Attorney General may from time to time require
  - Statements Filed to be Public Records –
    - All statements filed shall be public records and open to public examination and inspection at all reasonable hours under such rules and regulations as the Attorney General may prescribe
- Rules and Regulations – 54 Stat. 1203–1204 § III
  - The Attorney General is authorized at any time to make, amend, and rescind such rules and regulations as may be necessary to carry out the provisions of this Act, including rules and regulations governing the statements required to be filed by this Act
- Penalty Provisions – 54 Stat. 1204 § IV
  - Any violation of any of the provisions of this Act shall be punishable by a fine of not more than $10,000 or by imprisonment for not more than five years, or both. Whoever in a statement filed willfully makes any false statement or willfully omits to state any fact which is required to be stated, or which is necessary to make the statements made not misleading, shall, upon conviction, be subject to a fine of not more than $2,000 or to imprisonment for not more than five years, or both
- Saving Clause – 54 Stat. 1204 § V
  - If any provision of this Act, or the application thereof to any person or circumstances, is held invalid, the remainder of the Act, and the application of such provisions to other persons or circumstances, shall not be affected thereby
- Effective Date – 54 Stat. 1204 § VI
  - This Act shall take effect on the ninetieth day after the date of its enactment, except that prior to such ninetieth day the Attorney General may make, amend, or rescind such rules and regulations as may be necessary to carry out the provisions of this Act

== See also ==
- Bourgeois nationalism
- Committee on Public Information
- Counterattack
- Democratic centralism
- Foreign Broadcast Information Service
- House Un-American Activities Committee
- Industrial Workers of the World
- Institute for Propaganda Analysis
- McCarthyism
- Point Four Program
- Political opportunity
- Red Channels
- Social movement theory
- United States Office of War Information

Anti-propaganda and United States associated legislation

- Communist Control Act of 1954
- Countering Foreign Propaganda and Disinformation Act
- McCarran Internal Security Act of 1950
- Smith–Mundt Act of 1948

Court Cases of United States Judicial Archives

- Communist Party v. Subversive Activities Control Board
- Smith Act trials of Communist Party leaders

Facets of domestic and international propaganda and social doctrine

- 1939 Nazi rally at Madison Square Garden
- Communist Party of United States
- Communist propaganda
- German Agrarian League
- John Reed Clubs
- Marxists Internet Archive
- Pan-German League
- Propaganda in Fascist Italy
- Propaganda in Imperial Japan
- Propaganda in the Soviet Union
- Reich Ministry of Public Propaganda
- Secret society
- Unemployed Councils
- Young Communist League USA

== Bibliography ==
- Investigation of Un-American Propaganda Activities in the United States – Volumes I – XVII. 1938–1944 – Special Committee on Un-American Activities. Washington, D.C.: United States Government Printing Office – via HathiTrust Digital Library.
- Investigation of Un-American Propaganda Activities in the United States – Transcript of Proceedings, Committee on Un-American Activities, House of Representatives, Eightieth Congress, First Session. Public Law 601 (section 121, subsection Q(2)) – Committee on Un-American Activities. Washington, D.C.: United States Government Printing Office. February 6, 1947 – via HathiTrust Digital Library.
- McLaughlin, Martin (June 18, 1991). "50 Years since the Smith Act Indictments". Fourth International 1992: The End of the Soviet Union. World Socialist Web Site.

== Periodical resources ==
Publications related to propaganda during the mid-20th century
- "FIGHTS ALIEN-LINK BILL; Lawyers Guild Asks Veto of Voorhis' Registration Plan". The New York Times. October 14, 1940.
- "NEW LAW IN EFFECT ON ALIEN SOCIETIES; Any Organization Controlled Abroad Must Register Now Under the Voorhis Act 30 DAYS TO BE ALLOWED Political Aims, Firearms and Where They Are Kept, Uniforms, Etc., Part of Data". The New York Times. January 15, 1941.
- Smith, Bruce Lannes (1942), "Democratic Control of Propaganda Through Registration and Disclosure I", Public Opinion Quarterly, 6 (1), Oxford University Press: 27–40, doi:10.1086/265531, JSTOR 2745035
- Kane, R. Keith (1942), "The O. F. F.", Public Opinion Quarterly, 6 (2): 204–220, doi:10.1086/265545, JSTOR 2745020
- Childs, Harwood L. (1943), "V. Public Information and Opinion", American Political Science Review, 37 (1), American Political Science Association: 56–68, doi:10.2307/1948994, JSTOR 1948994, S2CID 144744191
- Crowther, Bosley (June 27, 1949). "'The Red Menace,' Dealing With Communist Party in U.S., Shown at the Mayfair". The New York Times.
- Cremins, James S. (1965), "The Present Legal Status of the Communist Party, U.S.A.", American Bar Association Journal, 51 (5), American Bar Association: 469–472, JSTOR 25723219
- Bullock, Paul (1973), ""Rabbits and Radicals" Richard Nixon's 1946 Campaign Against Jerry Voorhis" [1946 California's 12th congressional district election], Southern California Quarterly, 55 (3), University of California Press: 319–359, doi:10.2307/41170489, JSTOR 41170489
- Valocchi, Steve (1993). "External Resources and the Unemployed Councils of the 1930s: Evaluating Six Propositions from Social Movement Theory". Sociological Forum. 8 (3). Springer: 451–470. doi:10.1007/BF01115054. JSTOR 684570. S2CID 143811514.
- Callaghan, John T. (2014). "Anti-Communism in the USA and American Foreign Policy in the Late 1940s". Twentieth Century Communism. 2014 (6). Lawrence & Wishart: 149–170. ISSN 1758-6437.
- Hunt, Jonathan (2015). "Communists and the Classroom: Radicals in U.S. Education, 1930-1960". Composition Studies. 43 (2). Parlor Press: 22–42. JSTOR 45157098.

- "Classification 102: Voorhis Act". Federal Bureau of Investigation Records – FBI Records Classifications. U.S. National Archives and Records Administration. June 21, 1942.
