= Jarecki v. G.D. Searle & Co. =

- Supreme Court of the United States

Argued March 21, 1961 Decided June 12, 1961
- Full case name: Jarecki, former Collector of Internal Revenue, et al. v. G.D. Searle & Co.
- Citations: 367 U.S. 303 (more) 81 S. Ct. 1579; 6 L. Ed. 2d 859; 1961 U.S. LEXIS 2149

Holding
- Income resulting from the manufacture and sale of certain patented drugs, cameras, camera equipment and stereo products resulting from inventions is not included within the statutory definition of "abnormal income," in 456 (a), so as to qualify for Korean War excess profits tax relief under the Excess Profits Tax Act of 1950.

Court membership
- Chief Justice Earl Warren Associate Justices Hugo Black · Felix Frankfurter; William O. Douglas · Tom C. Clark; John M. Harlan II · William J. Brennan Jr. Charles E. Whittaker · Potter Stewart

Case opinion
- Majority: Warren

Jarecki v. G.D. Searle & Co., 367 U.S. 303 (1961), was a U.S. Supreme Court case.

Jarecki is an example of the maxim noscitur a sociis: a word is known by the company it keeps. The Court noted that noscitur a sociis is not an inescapable rule. It further noted that the maxim is often wisely applied where a word is capable of many meanings. The reason that it is applied in the case of many meanings is that it avoids giving unintended breadth to Acts of Congress.

== See also ==
- List of United States Supreme Court cases, volume 367
