= Noto v. United States =

- Supreme Court of the United States

Argued October 10, 1960 Decided June 5, 1961
- Full case name: Noto v. United States
- Citations: 367 U.S. 290 (more) 81 S. Ct. 1517; 6 L. Ed. 2d 836

Holding
- The trial evidence was insufficient to prove that the Communist Party advocated violent overthrow of the government not as an abstract doctrine, but by the use of language reasonably and ordinarily calculated to incite persons to action, immediately or in the future.

Court membership
- Chief Justice Earl Warren Associate Justices Hugo Black · Felix Frankfurter; William O. Douglas · Tom C. Clark; John M. Harlan II · William J. Brennan Jr. Charles E. Whittaker · Potter Stewart

Case opinion
- Majority: Harlan, joined by unanimous

Laws applied
- Smith Act, McCarran Act

Noto v. United States, 367 U.S. 290 (1961), was a 1961 United States Supreme Court case that reversed the felony conviction of a lower-echelon official of the Communist Party USA (CPUSA).

== Background ==
John Francis Noto of Buffalo, New York, was the chairman of the CPUSA for upstate New York. According to officials of the Federal Bureau of Investigation, Noto "went underground" in 1951. A grand jury issued a secret indictment for his arrest in November 1954 and he was taken into custody on August 31, 1955 He was convicted of a felony in federal District Court in Rochester in 1956 under the membership clause of the Smith Act, which made membership in an organization that advocates the violent overthrow of the United States government a felony. He was sentenced to five years in prison. He challenged the constitutionality of that clause on appeal. The Court of Appeals affirmed his conviction on December 31, 1958, and with respect to the membership clause said: "Clearly this is not a prosecution of membership per se but of membership with knowledge and criminal intent."

== Decision ==
The Supreme Court case reversed Noto's conviction on June 5, 1961, in a unanimous decision, finding that the evidence presented at trial was not sufficient to demonstrate that the Party was advocating action to cause the forcible overthrow of the government.

Justice Harlan wrote:

The evidence was insufficient to prove that the Communist Party presently advocated forcible overthrow of the Government not as an abstract doctrine, but by the use of language reasonably and ordinarily calculated to incite persons to action, immediately or in the future. ... In order to support a conviction under the membership clause of the Smith Act, there must be some substantial direct or circumstantial evidence of a call to violence now or in the future which is both sufficiently strong and sufficiently pervasive to lend color to the otherwise ambiguous theoretical material regarding Communist Party teaching and to justify the inference that such a call to violence may fairly be imputed to the Party as a whole, and not merely to some narrow segment of it.

Justices Black and Douglas wrote concurring opinions that argued that the Court should have gone further and ruled that the membership clause of the Smith Act was unconstitutional. Douglas wrote that "the utterances, attitudes, and associations in this case ... are, in my view, wholly protected by the First Amendment, and not subject to inquiry, examination, or prosecution by the Federal Government." Black characterized Harlan's review of the inadequacy of the trial testimony sarcastically:

I cannot join an opinion which implies that the existence of liberty is dependent upon the efficiency of the Government's informers. I prefer to rest my concurrence in the judgment reversing petitioner's conviction on what I regard as the more solid ground that the First Amendment forbids the Government to abridge the rights of freedom of speech, press and assembly.

On the same day, the Court upheld a provision of the Internal Security Act of 1950 that required "Communist action" organizations to register with the government, which subjected their members to a variety of restrictions. Observers assessed the Court's sustaining the membership clause of the Smith Act in that light. Anthony Lewis wrote in the New York Times: "The court's opinions were carefully limited and did not give the government a blank check in applying the two statutes. Nevertheless, the decisions were substantial victories for the government—the most important legal victories it has had in the internal security field in many years."

== See also ==
- Dennis v. United States, 341 U.S. 494 (1951)
- Scales v. United States, 367 U.S. 203 (1961)
- Yates v. United States, 354 U.S. 298 (1957)
- Smith Act trials of communist party leaders
