= Scales v. United States =

- Supreme Court of the United States

Argued April 29, 1959 Reargued October 10, 1960 Decided June 5, 1961
- Full case name: Scales v. United States
- Citations: 367 U.S. 203 (more) 81 S. Ct. 1469; 6 L. Ed. 2d 782

Holding
- The Internal Security Act of 1950, which provides, in part, that neither "the holding of office nor membership in any Communist organization by any person shall constitute per se a violation" of that or any other criminal statute, did not repeal pro tanto the membership clause of the Smith Act by excluding from the reach of that clause membership in any Communist organization

Court membership
- Chief Justice Earl Warren Associate Justices Hugo Black · Felix Frankfurter; William O. Douglas · Tom C. Clark; John M. Harlan II · William J. Brennan Jr. Charles E. Whittaker · Potter Stewart

Case opinions
- Majority: Harlan, joined by Frankfurter, Clark, Whittaker, Stewart
- Dissent: Black
- Dissent: Douglas
- Dissent: Brennan, joined by Warren, Douglas

Laws applied
- Smith Act, McCarran Act

Scales v. United States, 367 U.S. 203 (1961), was a 1960 decision of the United States Supreme Court that upheld the conviction of Junius Scales for violating of the Smith Act on the basis on his membership in the Communist Party of the United States (CPUSA).

== Decision ==
Junius Scales was the leader of the North Carolina branch of the CPUSA. He was convicted in 1955, but the sentence was overturned on appeal due to procedural mistakes by the prosecution. He was retried and convicted again in 1958. Prosecutors pursued Scales' case because he specifically advocated violent political action and gave demonstrations of martial arts skills.

Scales appealed his conviction to the Supreme Court. He contended that the 1950 McCarran Internal Security Act rendered the Smith Act's membership clause ineffective, because the McCarran Act explicitly stated that membership in a communist party does not constitute a per se violation of any criminal statute. On June 5, 1961, the Supreme Court, in a 5–4 decision, upheld the conviction of Scales, finding that the Smith Act membership clause was constitutional because it required prosecutors to prove that there was direct advocacy of violence and that the membership was substantial and active, not passive or technical. Justices Harlan and Frankfurter, who joined the 1957 Yates decision that held that free speech is protected unless it poses a "clear and present danger", joined the majority in Scales.

A New York Times editorial a few days after the decision said that the Court had departed from the "Holmes-Brandeis" view by punishing "membership in a party that advocates violent overthrow" rather than "conspiring to advocate". It continued:

[O]nly speech is involved in Smith Act prosecutions. The act does not punish espionage, sabotage, physical violence or actual attempts to overthrow the Government. Those charged under the act ... are accused only of advocating illegal acts in the future. And no reasonable person can believe that the Communists are sufficiently persuasive in this country to create any "immediate" likelihood of success for their subversive ideas.

In a letter to the Times, Rep. Francis E. Walter, chair of the House Un-American Activities Committee, countered:

It was not speech on the part of Junius Scales that led to his trial and conviction. It was his cold, calculated act of joining the Communist party [sic], remaining a member of it for many years and holding in it official posts which gave him an active role in the direction of an organization which, you tacitly admit in your editorial, is characterized by its "secret, conspiratorial nature and domination from abroad.

President John F. Kennedy commuted Scales' sentence on Christmas Eve, 1962. Scales was the last person convicted under the Smith Act to be released from prison.

Scales was the last member of the CPUSA convicted under the Smith Act and the only person convicted under its membership clause whose conviction was not overturned on appeal. Others were convicted under the Act for conspiring to overthrow the government. Scales is the only Supreme Court decision to uphold a conviction based solely upon membership in a political party.

== See also ==
- Dennis v. United States, 341 U.S. 494 (1951)
- Noto v. United States, 367 U.S. 290 (1961)
- Yates v. United States, 354 U.S. 298 (1957)
- Smith Act trials of communist party leaders
