= Schlude v. Commissioner =

- Supreme Court of the United States

Argued December 10, 1962 Decided February 18, 1963
- Full case name: Schlude, et ux. v. Commissioner of Internal Revenue
- Citations: 372 U.S. 128 (more) 83 S. Ct. 601; 9 L. Ed. 2d 633; 1963 U.S. LEXIS 2583

Case history
- Prior: 32 T.C. 1271 (1959); reversed, 283 F.2d 234 (8th Cir. 1960); cert. granted, vacated, and remanded, 367 U.S. 911 (1961); rehearing denied, 368 U.S. 873 (1961); Tax Court affirmed on remand, 296 F.2d 721 (8th Cir. 1961); cert. granted, 370 U.S. 902 (1962).

Holding
- Under the accrual method, taxpayers must include as income in a particular year advance payments by way of cash, negotiable notes, and contract installments falling due but remaining unpaid during that year.

Court membership
- Chief Justice Earl Warren Associate Justices Hugo Black · William O. Douglas; Tom C. Clark · John M. Harlan II; William J. Brennan Jr. · Potter Stewart; Byron White · Arthur Goldberg

Case opinions
- Majority: White, joined by Warren, Black, Clark, Brennan
- Dissent: Stewart, joined by Douglas, Harlan, Goldberg

Laws applied
- Internal Revenue Code

Schlude v. Commissioner, 372 U.S. 128 (1963), is a decision by the United States Supreme Court in which the Court held that, under the accrual method, taxpayers must include as income in a particular year advance payments by way of cash, negotiable notes, and contract installments falling due but remaining unpaid during that year. In doing so, the Court tossed aside the matching principle in favor of the earlier-of test.

== Facts ==
The petitioners operated ballroom dancing studios. They kept their books and completed income tax returns on a fiscal year accrual basis. Dancing lessons were offered under either of two basic contracts. The cash plan contract required the student to pay the entire down payment in cash at the time the contract was executed, with the balance due in installments thereafter. The deferred payment contract required only a portion of the down payment to be paid in cash, with the remainder of the down payment due in stated installments. The balance of the contract price was to be paid as designated in a negotiable note signed at the time the contract was executed.

The contracts included a specific number of lesson hours ranging from five to 1,200 hours. Some contracts even provided for lifetime courses that entitled the student to two hours of lessons per month plus two parties a year for life. Although the contracts designated the period during which the lessons had to be taken, there was no schedule of specific dates.

The Commissioner included in gross income for the years in question advance payments by way of cash, negotiable notes, and contract installments falling due but remaining unpaid during that year. The Tax Court and the Court of Appeals upheld the Commissioner.

== Issue ==
Was it proper for the Commissioner, exercising his discretion under § 446(b) to reject the studio’s accounting system, as not clearly reflecting income and to include as income in a particular year advance payments by way of cash, negotiable notes, and contract installments falling due but remaining unpaid during that year?

== Holding ==
The Supreme Court holds that it was proper for the Commissioner to include in income advance payments by way of cash, negotiable notes, and contract installments falling due but remaining unpaid during that year. The Court holds that the problem is controlled by American Automobile Ass'n v. United States.

== Rationale ==
In American Automobile Association v. United States, the Court held that the Commissioner was correct in including in taxpayer’s gross income for each year the entire amount of membership dues actually received in the taxable calendar year without regard to expected future service expense in the subsequent year. The Court rejected the taxpayer’s system as artificial since the advance payments related to services which were to be performed only upon customers’ demands and not on fixed dates in the future.

The Court likened this case to American Automobile Association because the contracts did not provide for lessons on fixed dates after the taxable year. Instead, the lessons were to be arranged from time to time by the instructor and his student. Therefore, the student could arrange for some or all of the additional lessons or could simply allow their rights to lapse. As in American Automobile Association, the services were rendered solely on customers’ demands without relation to fixed dates in the future.

The Court also relied on Spring City Foundry v. Commissioner. In Spring City Foundry, the Court held that, for an accrual basis taxpayer, “it is the right to receive and not the actual receipt that determines the inclusion of the amount in gross income.” The Court reasoned that in this case, the right to receive the advance payments had become fixed at least at the time they were due and payable.

== Dissent ==
The dissent believes that the majority decision is in direct contrast to the most elementary principle of accrual accounting—that advances be considered reportable income only in the year in which they are earned by the taxpayer’s rendition of the services for which the payments were made. The dissent argues that this decision “completes the mutilation of a basic element of the accrual method of reporting income”—a method which has been explicitly approved by Congress for almost half a century.

== See also ==
- List of United States Supreme Court cases, volume 372
