= Smith Act =

United States federal statute

- Other short titles: Civilian and Military Organizations License Act
- Long title: An Act to prohibit certain subversive activities; to amend certain provisions of law with respect to the admission and deportation of aliens; to require the fingerprinting and registration of aliens; and for other purposes.
- Acronyms (colloquial): ARA
- Nicknames: Alien Registration Act, 1940
- Enacted by: the 76th United States Congress
- Effective: June 28, 1940

Citations
- Public law: Pub. L. 76–670
- Statutes at Large: 54 Stat. 670, Chapter 439

Codification
- Acts repealed: Repealed. June 27, 1952, ch. 477, title IV, § 403(a)(39), 66 Stat. 280, eff. Dec. 24, 1952
- Titles amended: 8 U.S.C.: Aliens and Nationality
- U.S.C. sections created: 8 U.S.C. ch. 10 § 451

Legislative history
- Introduced in the House as H.R. 5138 by Howard W. Smith (D–VA) on June 29, 1939; Committee consideration by House Judiciary, Senate Judiciary; Passed the House on July 29, 1939 (Passed); Passed the Senate on June 15, 1940 (Passed); Reported by the joint conference committee on June 17, 1940; agreed to by the House on June 22, 1940 (382-4) and by the Senate on June 22, 1940 (Agreed); Signed into law by President Franklin D. Roosevelt on June 28, 1940

United States Supreme Court cases
- Harisiades v. Shaughnessy, 342 U.S. 580 (1952); Bridges v. Wixon; Dennis v. United States; Yates v. United States; Watkins v. United States; Noto v. United States; Scales v. United States

The Alien Registration Act, popularly known as the Smith Act, 76th United States Congress, 3rd session, ch. 439, 54 Stat. 670, 18 U.S.C. § 2385 is a United States federal statute that was enacted on June 28, 1940. It set criminal penalties for advocating the overthrow of the U.S. government by force or violence, and required all foreigners over the age of 14 to register with the federal government.

Approximately 215 people were indicted under the legislation, including alleged communists and socialists. Prosecutions under the Smith Act continued until a series of U.S. Supreme Court decisions in 1957 reversed a number of convictions under the Act as being unconstitutional. The law has been amended several times.

== Legislative history ==
The U.S. government has attempted on several occasions to regulate speech in wartime, beginning with the Alien and Sedition Acts of 1798. During and following World War I, a series of statutes addressed a complex of concerns that included enemy espionage and disruption, anti-war activism, and the radical ideologies of anarchism and Bolshevism, all identified with immigrant communities. Congressional investigations of 'extremist' organizations in 1935 resulted in calls for the renewal of those statutes. The Foreign Agents Registration Act of 1938 addressed a particular concern but not the general problem. As U.S. involvement in World War II seemed ever more likely, the possibility of betrayal from within gained currency. The Spanish Civil War had given this possibility a name, a "fifth column", and the popular press in the U.S. blamed internal subversion for the fall of France to the Nazis in just six weeks in May and June 1940. Patriotic organizations and the popular press raised alarms and provided examples. In July 1940, Time magazine called fifth-column talk a "national phenomenon".

In the late 1930s, several legislative proposals tried to address sedition itself and the underlying concern with the presence of large numbers of foreigners, including citizens of countries with which the U.S. might soon be at war. An omnibus bill that included several measures died in 1939, but the Senate Judiciary Committee revived it in May 1940. It drew some of its language from statutes recently passed at the state level, and combined anti-alien and anti-sedition sections with language crafted specifically to help the government in its attempts to deport Australian-born union leader Harry Bridges. With little debate, the House of Representatives approved it by a vote of 382 to 4, with 45 not voting, on June 22, 1940, the day the French signed an armistice with Germany. The Senate did not take a recorded vote. It was signed into law by President Franklin D. Roosevelt on June 28, 1940. The Act is referred to by the name of its principal author, Rep. Howard W. Smith (Democrat-Virginia), a leader of the anti-labor bloc in Congress.

A few weeks later, the New York Times discussed the context in which the alien registration provisions were included and the Act passed:

The Alien Registration Act was merely one of many laws hastily passed in the first spasm of fear engendered by the success of fifth columns in less fortunate countries. Suddenly the European war seemed almost at our doors, and who could tell what secret agents were already at work in America? So, partly because some such bill would be adopted anyway, and partly because the step, normally distasteful, appeared inevitable, the Administration sponsored the legislation.

Also in June, the President transferred the Immigration and Naturalization Service from the Department of Labor to the Department of Justice (DOJ), demonstrating that the federal government viewed its alien population as a security concern as war grew more likely.

In mid-August, officials of the DOJ held a two-day conference with state officials they called "Law Enforcement Problems of National Defense". Attorney General Jackson and FBI Director Hoover delineated the proper roles for federal and state authorities with respect to seditious activities. They successfully forestalled state regulation of aliens and found state officials receptive to their arguments that states needed to prevent vigilantism and protect aliens, while trusting federal authorities to use the Smith Act to deal with espionage and "fifth column" activities.

On October 13, 1941, the 77th United States Congress amended the Smith Act, authorizing a criminal offense for the unlawful reproduction of alien registration receipt cards.

== Provisions ==
Title I. Subversive activities. The Smith Act set federal criminal penalties that included fines or imprisonment for as long as twenty years, and denied all employment by the federal government for five years following a conviction for anyone who:

... with intent to cause the overthrow or destruction of any such government, prints, publishes, edits, issues, circulates, sells, distributes, or publicly displays any written or printed matter advocating, advising, or teaching the duty, necessity, desirability, or propriety of overthrowing or destroying any government in the United States by force or violence, or attempts to do so; or ... organizes or helps or attempts to organize any society, group, or assembly of persons who teach, advocate, or encourage the overthrow or destruction of any such government by force or violence; or becomes or is a member of, or affiliates with, any such society, group, or assembly of persons, knowing the purposes thereof.

The Smith Act's prohibition of proselytizing on behalf of revolution repeated language found in previous statutes. It went beyond earlier legislation in outlawing action to "organize any society, group, or assembly" that works toward that end and then extended that prohibition to "membership" or "affiliation"—a term it did not define—with such a group.

Title II. Deportation. Because the Supreme Court in Kessler v. Strecker (1939) held that the Immigration Act of 1918 allowed the deportation of an alien only if his membership in a group advocating the violent overthrow of the government had not ceased, the Smith Act allowed for the deportation of any alien who "at the time of entering the United States, or ... at any time thereafter" was a member of or affiliated with such an organization.

The Smith Act expanded the grounds for deporting aliens to include weapons violations and abetting illegal immigration. It added heroin to the category of drug violations.

Title III. Alien registration. The Smith Act required aliens applying for visas to register and be fingerprinted. Every other alien resident of the United States:

who is fourteen years of age or older, ... and remains in the United States for thirty days or longer, [is] to apply for registration and to be fingerprinted before the expiration of such thirty days.

Registration would be under oath and include:

(1) the date and place of entry of the alien into the United States; (2) activities in which he has been and intends to be engaged; (3) the length of time he expects to remain in the United States; (4) the criminal record, if any, of such alien; and (5) such additional matters as may be prescribed by the Commissioner [of Immigration and Naturalization], with the approval of the Attorney General.

Guardians had to register minors, who had to register in person and be fingerprinted within 30 days of their fourteenth birthday. Post offices were designated as the location for registering and fingerprinting. Aliens were to notify the government if their residence changed, and to confirm their residence every three months. Penalties included fines up to $1000 and up to six months imprisonment.

== Alien registration ==
Registrations began on August 27, 1940, and the newly created Alien Registration Division of the Immigration and Naturalization Service planned to register between three and three and a half million people at 45,000 post offices by December 26, after which those not registered became subject to the Smith Act's penalties. The Division held the view that registration benefited the alien, who "is now safeguarded from bigoted persecution." The alien was to bring a completed form to a post office and be fingerprinted. Registration cards would be delivered by mail and would serve "in the nature of protection of the alien later runs afoul of the police" [sic]. The details required for registration had been expanded since the passage of the Act to include race, employer's name and address, relatives in the U.S., organization memberships, application for citizenship, and military service record for the U.S. or any other country. Solicitor General Francis Biddle had responsibility for the Division, which was headed by Earl G. Harrison during its first six months. In a radio address meant to reassure aliens, Biddle said: "It was not the intention of Congress to start a witch hunt or a program of persecution." Calling it a "patriotic duty," he said:

Many people still feel that there is a stigma attached to being fingerprinted. I have been fingerprinted, as have millions of others who served in the armed forces of the United States. All Federal civil service employees are fingerprinted. Even postal savings depositors are fingerprinted. I assure you that there is no stigma attached to being fingerprinted in this day and age.

Government efforts to encourage registration asked citizens to participate:

The Immigration and Naturalization Service asks for the cooperation of all citizens in carrying out the Alien Registration program in a friendly manner so that our large foreign population is not antagonized. Citizens may be of great help to their non-citizen neighbors or relatives by explaining to those who do not speak English well what the registration is, where aliens go to register, and what information they must give.

The number registered passed 4.7 million by January 1941.

After the U.S. declared war in 1941, federal authorities used data gathered from alien registrations to identify citizens of enemy nations and take 2,971 of them into custody by the end of the year. A different set of requirements was imposed during the war on enemy aliens, citizens of nations with which the U.S. was at war, by presidential proclamations of January 14, 1942, without reference to the Smith Act.

In December 1950, following an Immigration and Naturalization Service hearing, Claudia Jones, a citizen of Trinidad, was ordered deported from the U.S. for violating the McCarran Act as an alien (non-U.S. citizen) who had joined the Communist Party (CPUSA). The evidence of her party membership included information she provided when completing her Alien Registration form on December 24, 1940.

== Legal proceedings ==
=== Harry Bridges ===
The Smith Act was written so that federal authorities could deport radical labor organizer Harry Bridges, an immigrant from Australia. Deportation hearings against Bridges in 1939 found he did not qualify for deportation because he was not currently—as the Alien Act of 1918 required—a member of or affiliated with an organization that advocated the overthrow of the government. The Smith Act allowed deportation of an alien who had been "at any time" since arriving in the U.S. a member of, or affiliated with, such an organization. A second round of deportation hearings ended after ten weeks in June 1941. In September, the special examiner who led the hearings recommended deportation, but the Board of Immigration Appeals (BIA) reversed that order after finding the government's two key witnesses unreliable. In May 1942, though the Roosevelt administration was now putting its anti-Communist activities on hold in the interest of furthering the Soviet-American alliance, Attorney General Biddle overruled the BIA and ordered Bridges deported. Bridges appealed and lost in District Court and the Court of Appeals, but the Supreme Court held 5–3 on June 18, 1945, in the case of Bridges v. Wixon that the government had not proven Bridges was "affiliated" with the CPUSA, a word it interpreted to require more than "sympathy" or "mere cooperation".

=== Minneapolis 1941 ===
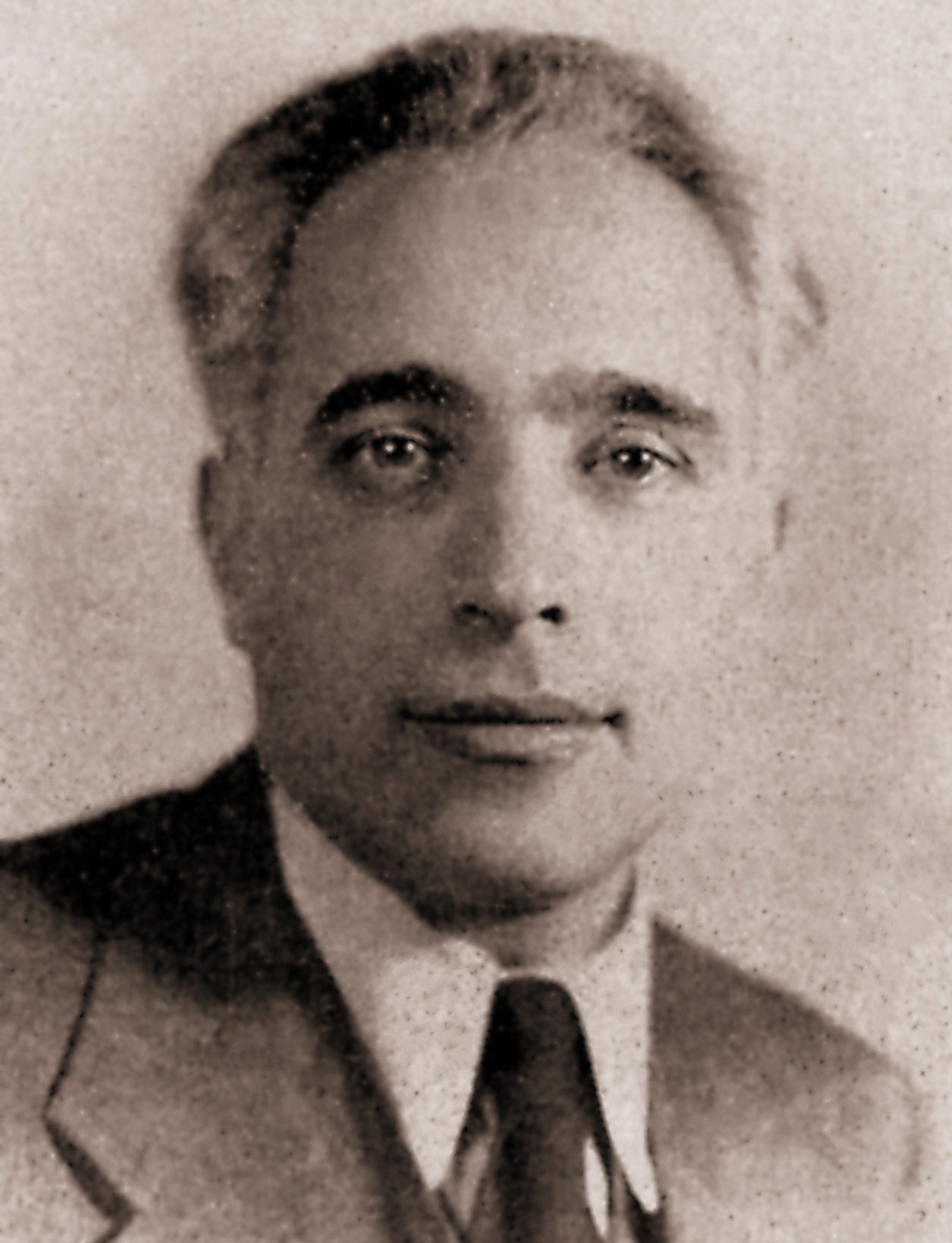
Albert Goldman, a member of the Socialist Workers Party and defendant in the Minneapolis case, acted as chief defense counsel.

On June 27, 1941, as part of a campaign to end labor militancy in the defense industry, FBI agents raided the Minneapolis and St. Paul offices of the Socialist Workers Party (SWP), a Trotskyist splinter party that controlled Local 544 of the Teamsters union though it had fewer than two thousand members in 30 U.S. cities. The union had grown steadily in the late 1930s, had organized federal relief workers and led a strike against the Works Progress Administration (WPA), a New Deal agency. In mid-July, a federal grand jury indicted 29 people, either members of the SWP or Local 544 of the Teamsters union, or both.

SWP defendants included James P. Cannon, Carl Skoglund, Farrell Dobbs, Grace Carlson, Harry DeBoer, Max Geldman, Albert Goldman, and twelve other party leaders. Goldman acted as the defendants' lawyer during the trial. The SWP had been influential in Minneapolis since the Teamsters Strike of 1934. It advocated strikes and the continuation of labor union militancy during World War II under its Proletarian Military Policy. An SWP member edited the Northwest Organizer, the weekly newspaper of the Minneapolis Teamsters, and the local union remained militant even as the national union grew more conservative. The defendants were accused of having plotted to overthrow the U.S. government in violation of the newly passed Smith Act and of the Sedition Act of 1861, to enforce which (according to M. G. Wallace, writing in the Virginia Law Review), as of March 1920 no serious previous attempt had ever been made.

When critics argued that the government should adhere to the doctrine enunciated by Justice Holmes that free speech could only be prosecuted if it presented "a clear and present danger", Attorney General Biddle replied that Congress had considered both that standard and the international situation when writing the Smith Act's proscriptions. At trial, the judge took Biddle's view and refused to instruct the jury in the "clear and present danger" standard as the defendants' attorneys requested. The trial began in Federal District Court in Minneapolis on October 27, 1941. The prosecution presented evidence that the accused had amassed a small arsenal of pistols and rifles and conducted target practices and drills. Some had met with Trotsky in Mexico, and many witnesses testified to their revolutionary rhetoric.

The judge ordered that five of the defendants be acquitted on both counts for lack of evidence. After deliberating for 56 hours, the jury found the other 23 defendants (one had committed suicide during the trial) not guilty of violating the 1861 statute by conspiring to overthrow the government by force. The jury found 18 of the defendants guilty of violating the Smith Act either by distributing written material designed to cause insubordination in the armed forces or by advocating the overthrow of the government by force. The jury recommended leniency. On December 8, 1941, 12 defendants received 16-month sentences and the remaining 11 received 12-months. Time magazine minimized the danger from the SWP, calling it "a nestful of mice". The American Civil Liberties Union (ACLU) and critics on the left worried that the case created a dangerous precedent.

On appeal, a unanimous three-judge panel of the Eighth Circuit Court of Appeals upheld the convictions of the 18. The judges found it unnecessary to consider the "clear and present danger" standard in "situations where the legislative body had outlawed certain utterances". The Supreme Court declined to review the case. Those convicted began to serve their sentences on December 31, 1943. The last of them were released in February 1945. Biddle, in his memoirs published in 1962, stated that he regretted having authorized the prosecution.

=== George W. Christians ===
In March 1942, the government charged a Tennessee radical named George W. Christians, who had at various times described himself as both a Communist and a Fascist, with violating the Smith Act by attempting to spread dissent in the armed forces. Life had published a photo of Christians in 1939 under the heading "Some of the Voices of Hate". Christians said he promoted a "human effort monetary system" and supported "a paper and ink revolution for economic liberty". After a four-day trial, he was convicted and sentenced to five years in prison.

=== Other prosecutions ===
Early in 1942, President Roosevelt, supported by the rest of his Cabinet, urged Attorney General Biddle to prosecute fascist sympathizers and anti-Semites. Biddle thought the Smith Act was inadequate, but Congress refused to renew the Sedition Act of 1918 as he asked.

In 1942, 16 members of the "Mankind United" semi-religious cult, including founder Arthur Bell, were arrested by the FBI under the act. Although 12 were found guilty, they all won on appeal and none served a jail sentence.

President Roosevelt especially wanted to take legal action against several prominent pre-war critics on both on the left and right such as Charles Lindbergh and the so-called "McCormick-Patterson axis" of Robert R. McCormick of the Chicago Daily Tribune, and the president's former allies Joseph Medill Patterson of the New York Daily News and his sister Cissy Patterson of the Washington Times-Herald in disdain. Although the four had rallied to the war effort after Pearl Harbor, Roosevelt repeatedly pressed Attorney General Biddle to investigate them. Partly to appease Roosevelt, Biddle began a series of prosecutions of lesser-known individuals. These culminated in the Sedition Trial of 1944. Historian Leo P. Ribuffo coined the term "Brown Scare" to cover the events leading up to the trial.

==== Washington 1944 ====
Twenty-eight prominent individuals were indicted in Washington, D.C., in July 1942, accused of violations of the Smith Act, in what became the largest sedition trial in the US. The government expanded the list of defendants, indicting 42 people. After delays while the government amended the charges and struggled to construct its case, the trial, now expanded to 30 defendants, began on April 17, 1944. The defendants were a heterogeneous group that held either isolationist or pro-fascist views. In the case of United States v. McWilliams (named after Joe McWilliams), the prosecutor, O. John Rogge, hoped to prove they were Nazi propaganda agents by demonstrating the similarity between their statements and enemy propaganda. The weakness of the government's case, combined with the trial's slow progress in the face of disruption by the defendants, led the press to lose interest. A mistrial was declared on November 29, 1944, following the death of the trial judge, Edward C. Eicher. Among the defendants were: George Sylvester Viereck, Lawrence Dennis, Elizabeth Dilling, William Dudley Pelley, Joe McWilliams, Robert Edward Edmondson, James True, Gerald Winrod, William Griffin, Prescott Freese Dennett, German American Bund leaders Gerhard Kunze, August Klapprott, and Herman Schwinn, and in absentia, Ulrich Fleischhauer. Defendant Lawrence Dennis mocked the affair by subtitling his account of the trial The Great Sedition Trial of 1944.

Only Rogge wanted to retry the case to "stop the spread of racial and religious intolerance." Supreme Court decisions since the 1942 indictments made convictions appear ever more unlikely. Roger Baldwin of the ACLU campaigned against renewing the prosecutions, securing the endorsement of many of the defendants' ideological opponents, including the American Jewish Committee, while the CPUSA held out for prosecuting them all to the limit. Tom Clark, Biddle's replacement as Attorney General in the Truman administration, vacillated about the case. In October 1946, he fired Rogge in a public dispute about publicizing DOJ information about right-wing activities. With the end of World War II, attention turned from the defeated ideologies of the Axis powers to the threat of Communism, and in December 1946 the government had the charges dismissed.

=== Communist Party trials ===
After a ten-month trial at the Foley Square Courthouse in Manhattan, eleven leaders of the Communist Party were convicted under the Smith Act in 1949. Ten defendants received sentences of five years and $10,000 fines. An eleventh defendant, Robert G. Thompson, a distinguished hero of the Second World War, was sentenced to three years in consideration of his military record. The five defense attorneys were cited for contempt of court and given prison sentences. Those convicted appealed the verdicts, and the Supreme Court upheld their convictions in 1951 in Dennis v. United States in a 6–2 decision.

Following that decision, the DOJ prosecuted dozens of cases. In total, by May 1956, another 131 communists were indicted, of whom 98 were convicted, nine acquitted, while juries brought no verdict in the other cases. Other party leaders indicted included Claudia Jones and Elizabeth Gurley Flynn, a founding member of the ACLU who had been expelled in 1940 for being a Communist.

Appeals from other trials reached the Supreme Court with varying results. On June 17, 1957, Yates v. United States held unconstitutional the convictions of numerous party leaders in a ruling that distinguished between advocacy of an idea for incitement and the teaching of an idea as a concept. The same day, the Court ruled 6–1 in Watkins v. United States that defendants could use the First Amendment as a defense against "abuses of the legislative process". On June 5, 1961, the Supreme Court upheld by 5–4 the conviction of Junius Scales under the "membership clause" of the Smith Act. Scales began serving a six-year sentence on October 2, 1961. He was released after serving fifteen months when President John F. Kennedy commuted his sentence in 1962.

Trials of "second string" communist leaders also occurred in the 1950s, including that of Maurice Braverman.

== See also ==
- Espionage Act of 1917
- Sedition Act of 1918
- Hatch Act of 1939
- Anti-Propaganda Act of 1940
- McCarthyism
- Subversive activities registration
