= List of United States Supreme Court cases, volume 367 =

This is a list of all the United States Supreme Court cases from volume 367 of the United States Reports:

Case name	Citation	Date decided
Communist Party v. Subversive Activities Control Board	367 U.S. 1	1961
Scales v. United States	367 U.S. 203	1961
Noto v. United States	367 U.S. 290	1961
Jarecki v. G.D. Searle & Co.	367 U.S. 303	1961
CAB v. Delta Air Lines, Inc.	367 U.S. 316	1961
Horton v. Liberty Mut. Ins. Co.	367 U.S. 348	1961
Gori v. United States	367 U.S. 364	1961
United States v. Shimer	367 U.S. 374	1961
Communist Party v. Catherwood	367 U.S. 389	1961
Power Reactor Dev. Co. v. Electrical Workers	367 U.S. 396	1961
Lott v. United States	367 U.S. 421	1961
Reck v. Pate	367 U.S. 433	1961
Deutch v. United States	367 U.S. 456	1961
Conner v. Simler	367 U.S. 486	1961
Craska v. New York	367 U.S. 487	1961
Cervieri v. Port of N.Y. Auth.	367 U.S. 487	1961
Torcaso v. Watkins	367 U.S. 488	1961
Poe v. Ullman	367 U.S. 497	1961
Piemonte v. United States	367 U.S. 556	1961
Culombe v. Connecticut	367 U.S. 568	1961
Mapp v. Ohio	367 U.S. 643	1961
AAA v. United States	367 U.S. 687	1961
Marcus v. Search Warrant	367 U.S. 717	1961
Machinists v. Street	367 U.S. 740	1961
Lathrop v. Donohue	367 U.S. 820	1961
Cafeteria & Rest. Workers v. McElroy	367 U.S. 886	1961
Bargaintown, U.S.A., Inc. v. Whitman	367 U.S. 903	1961
Beck v. Maine	367 U.S. 903	1961
Carolina Amusement Co. v. Martin	367 U.S. 904	1961
Birdwell v. Kirkland	367 U.S. 904	1961
Broughton v. Ohio	367 U.S. 905	1961
Weisberg v. Ohio	367 U.S. 905	1961
Commissioner v. Milwaukee & Suburban Transp. Corp.	367 U.S. 906	1961
Harper v. Bannan	367 U.S. 906	1961
Trubek v. Ullman	367 U.S. 907	1961
Tugwell v. Bush	367 U.S. 907	1961
Denny v. Bush	367 U.S. 908	1961
Louisiana v. United States (1961)	367 U.S. 908	1961
Swift & Co. v. United States	367 U.S. 909	1961
Hobbs v. Alaska	367 U.S. 909	1961
Virginia Elec. & Power Co. v. Johnson	367 U.S. 910	1961
Longshoremen v. South Carolina Ports Auth.	367 U.S. 910	1961
Commissioner v. Schlude	367 U.S. 911	1961
Family Fair, Inc. v. Ohio	367 U.S. 911	1961
