= Artnell Company v. Commissioner =

- Court: United States Court of Appeals for the Seventh Circuit
- Full case name: Artnell Company v. Commissioner of Internal Revenue
- Decided: September 19, 1968
- Citations: 400 F.2d 981; 68-2 USTC (CCH) ¶ 9593

Case history
- Prior history: 48 T.C. 411 (1967)
- Subsequent history: On remand, T.C. Memo. 1970-85

Court membership
- Judges sitting: Roger Kiley, Luther Merritt Swygert, Thomas E. Fairchild

Case opinions
- Majority: Fairchild, joined by a unanimous court

Laws applied
- Internal Revenue Code

Artnell Company v. Commissioner, 400 F.2d 981 (7th Cir. 1968) is a decision by the 7th Circuit Court of Appeals, in which the court, distinguishing from the holding in Schlude v. Commissioner, held that accrual method taxpayers are not required to include prepayments in gross income when there is certainty as to when performance would occur.

== Facts ==
The petitioner, an accrual method taxpayer, operated the Chicago White Sox professional baseball franchise using a fiscal year for federal income tax purposes. During the 1962 taxable year, the club sold single and season tickets to games to be played during the 1963 taxable year. The petitioner failed to report income from the sales on its 1962 return and instead reported the receipts as income in 1963.

The petitioner's decision to include income from its ticket sales in 1963, rather than 1962, was part of their practice of reporting income from ticket sales as the corresponding games were played.

The Commissioner argued that, in light of Schlude v. Commissioner, the income should have been reported in the year in which the payment was received, the 1962 taxable year.

== Issue ==
Must the taxpayer include in gross income for 1962 the sale of proceeds received from tickets allocable to games to be played in 1963?

== Holding ==
No. Despite the general rule that requires accrual method taxpayers to include advance payments in the year of receipt, the court carved out a narrow exception for taxpayers such as the petitioners, who are able to prove that services will be performed on fixed dates in one or more subsequent taxable years.

== Rationale ==
Generally, accrual method taxpayers include income in taxable year it is earned, rather than when it is received. However, the Supreme Court trilogy ending with Schlude required inclusion of prepayments in gross income because of the uncertainties as to when, or if, performance would occur. The court distinguished the facts of Artnell from this holding and found that the uncertainties present in previous cases that required the inclusion of advance payments in the year of receipt were not present. The Court found that the deferred income was attributable to games that were intended to be played on a fixed schedule and that notwithstanding rain delays there was certainty about when services would be performed. The court reasoned that there are some situations where deferral will so clearly reflect income, that the IRS abuses its discretion when it refuses to permit deferral.
