= Chicago Mustangs (1967–68) =

Defunct American soccer club

- Founded: 1967
- Dissolved: 1968
- Stadium: Comiskey Park
- Capacity: 46,550 (1954-1972)
- Owner: Arthur Allyn, Jr.
- President: John Allyn
- League: United Soccer Association (1967); North American Soccer League (1968)
- 1968: 2nd, Lakes Division
Home colors	Away colors

The Chicago Mustangs were an American professional soccer team based out of Chicago, Illinois, and were a charter member of the United Soccer Association (USA) in 1967. When the USA and rival National Professional Soccer League (NPSL) merged in 1968 to form the North American Soccer League (NASL), the team moved to the new league. The Mustangs played its home matches at Comiskey Park. The team folded at the conclusion of the 1968 NASL season.

== History ==
In 1966 several groups of entrepreneurs were exploring the idea of forming a professional soccer league in United States. One of these groups, United Soccer Association (USA) led by Jack Kent Cooke, selected 12 cities for team locations and Arthur Allyn Jr., co-owner with his brother of the Chicago White Sox, was awarded the Chicago franchise. Stu Holcomb, athletic director at Northwestern University, was hired to act as the team's general manager. The USA originally planned to start play in the spring of 1968; however the rival National Professional Soccer League, which secured a TV contract from CBS, announced it was ready to launch in 1967. Not wanting to let the rival league gain an advantage, the USA decided to launch early. Not having secured any player contracts, the league imported teams from Europe, Brazil, Argentina and Uruguay to represent the franchise cities. Italian team Cagliari Calcio was brought over to play as the Mustangs.

The Mustangs opened the season on May 27, 1967, in Chicago at Comiskey Park with a 1–0 loss to the Dallas Tornado with 5,872 fan in attendance. The Mustangs finished the 1967 season in third place of the Western Division with a record of 3 wins 7 ties and 2 loses and an average attendance of 4,207. Roberto Boninsegna would lead the team with 11 goals in 9 matches, he would later star for Inter Milan, Juventus and play for the Italian national football team in the 1970 FIFA World Cup.

With the merger of the United Soccer Association and the National Professional Soccer League it was announced that Chicago would be one of the 20-teams in play in the North American Soccer League (NASL). (Note: 17 teams contested the 1968 NASL season with three teams folding before the season began) The Mustangs finished the 1968 NASL season in second place of the Lakes Division with a record of 13 wins 9 ties and 10 losses and an average attendance of 2,463. By January 1969, ten of the NASL's 17 franchises had folded and the Mustangs dropped down to the semi-professional National Soccer League and eventually folded.

== Media coverage ==
The Mustangs had their home matches broadcast locally on WFLD channel 32 in 1967. Their sole nationally televised broadcast happened on May 19, 1968 on CBS versus the Toronto Falcons at Varsity Stadium, with WBBM-TV broadcasting locally, Jack Whitaker and Mario Machado with the commentary. The Mustangs had three matches, all at home, late in the 1968 season on WEEF-FM103.1 radio.

== Year-by-year ==
Year	League	W	L	T	Pts	Regular season	Playoffs	Avg. attendance
1967	USA	3	2	7	13	3rd, Western Division	Did not qualify	4,207
1968	NASL	13	10	9	164	2nd, Lakes Division	Did not qualify	2,463
