= Sarasota Jungle Gardens =

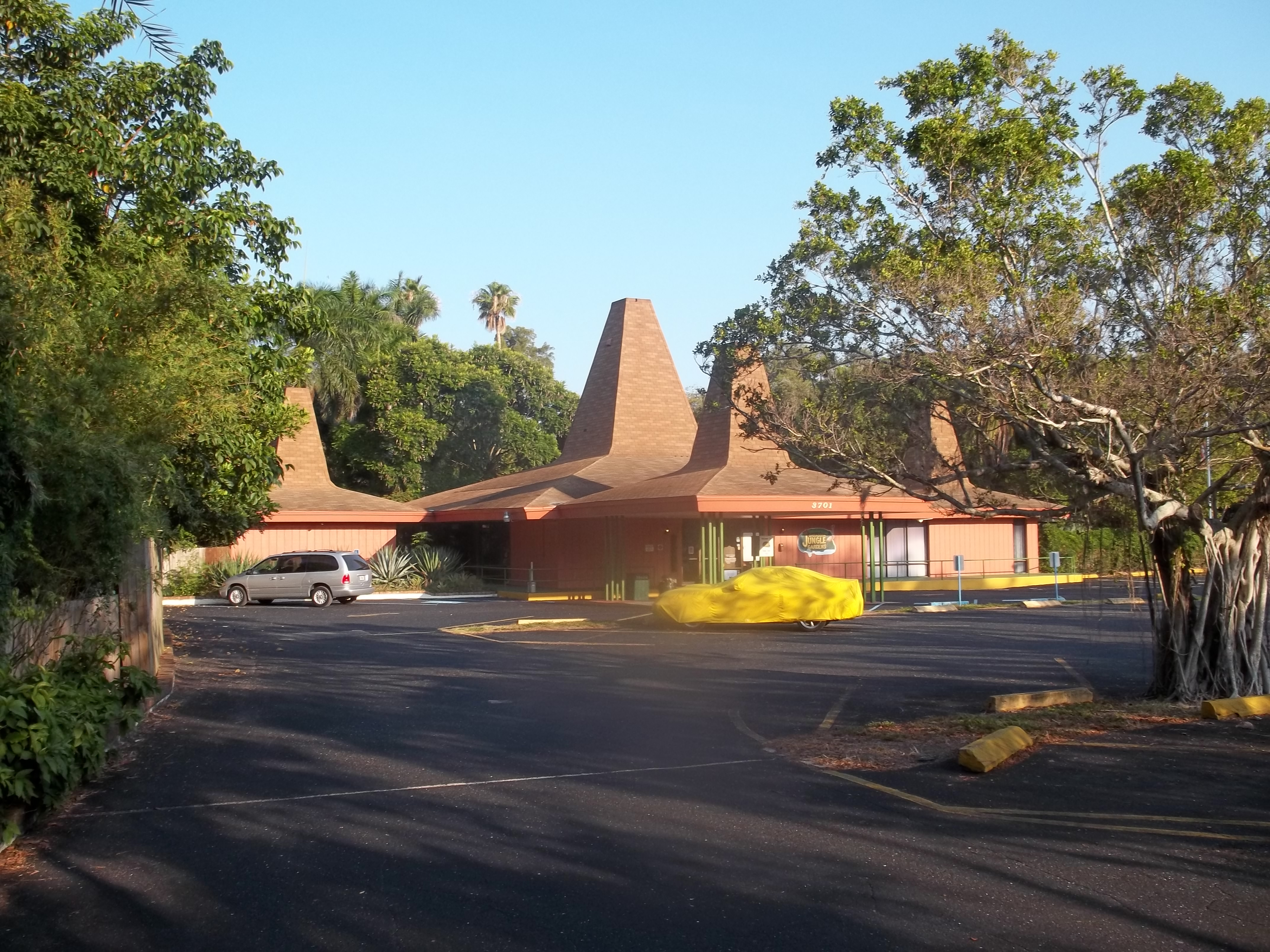
- Interactive map of Sarasota Jungle Gardens
- 27°22′04″N 82°33′21″W
- Date opened: December 31, 1939
- Location: Sarasota, Florida
- Land area: 10 acres (4.0 ha)
- Public transit: Breeze Transit
- Website: SarasotaJungleGardens.com

Sarasota Jungle Gardens is a tourist attraction located in Sarasota, Florida, United States, since 1939. The gardens contain over 10 acres (4.0 ha) of botanical plantings along with bird and animal shows. It is open to the public for a per-use ticket fee and also offers yearly membership passes.

== History ==
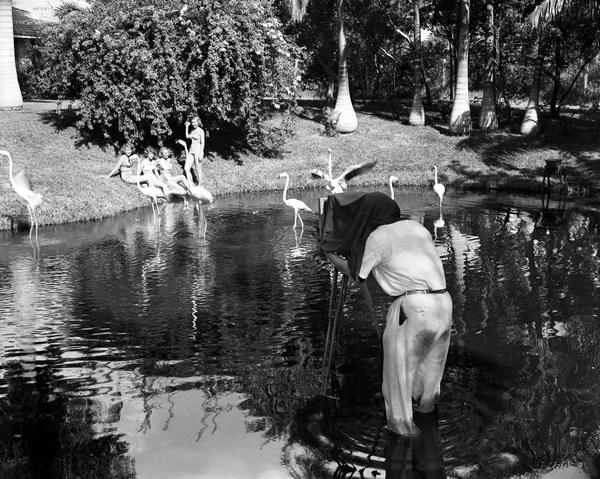
A photo shoot in the flamingo area

In the 1920s, the site was a swampy banana grove listed in city records as "an impenetrable swamp." In the early 1930s, David Breed Lindsay, a local newspaperman, purchased the grove to create botanical gardens.

Beginning in 1936, admission fees were charged and in 1940, Jungle Gardens opened for business in essentially its current form. In the early 1970s, Jungle Gardens was sold to the philanthropic Allyn family, who continue to manage it.

== Features ==
The biggest attraction at the park is the free-roaming flamingos. Guests may hand feed and walk among them. There are also other opportunities for up close interactive experiences with reptiles, parrots, butterflies, and other mammals. The gardens serve to inspire and educate thousands of local and international visitors each year and offer daily entertaining and educational shows. There is a cafe and gift shop on site. The gardens include native species and exotic plants from around the world, such as the Australian nut tree, a bunya-bunya tree, the largest Norfolk Island pine in Florida, bulrush, strangler figs, royal palms, Philodendron selloum, banana trees, Peruvian apple cactus, and staghorn ferns, as well as native red maples, oaks and bald cypress.

== Gallery ==
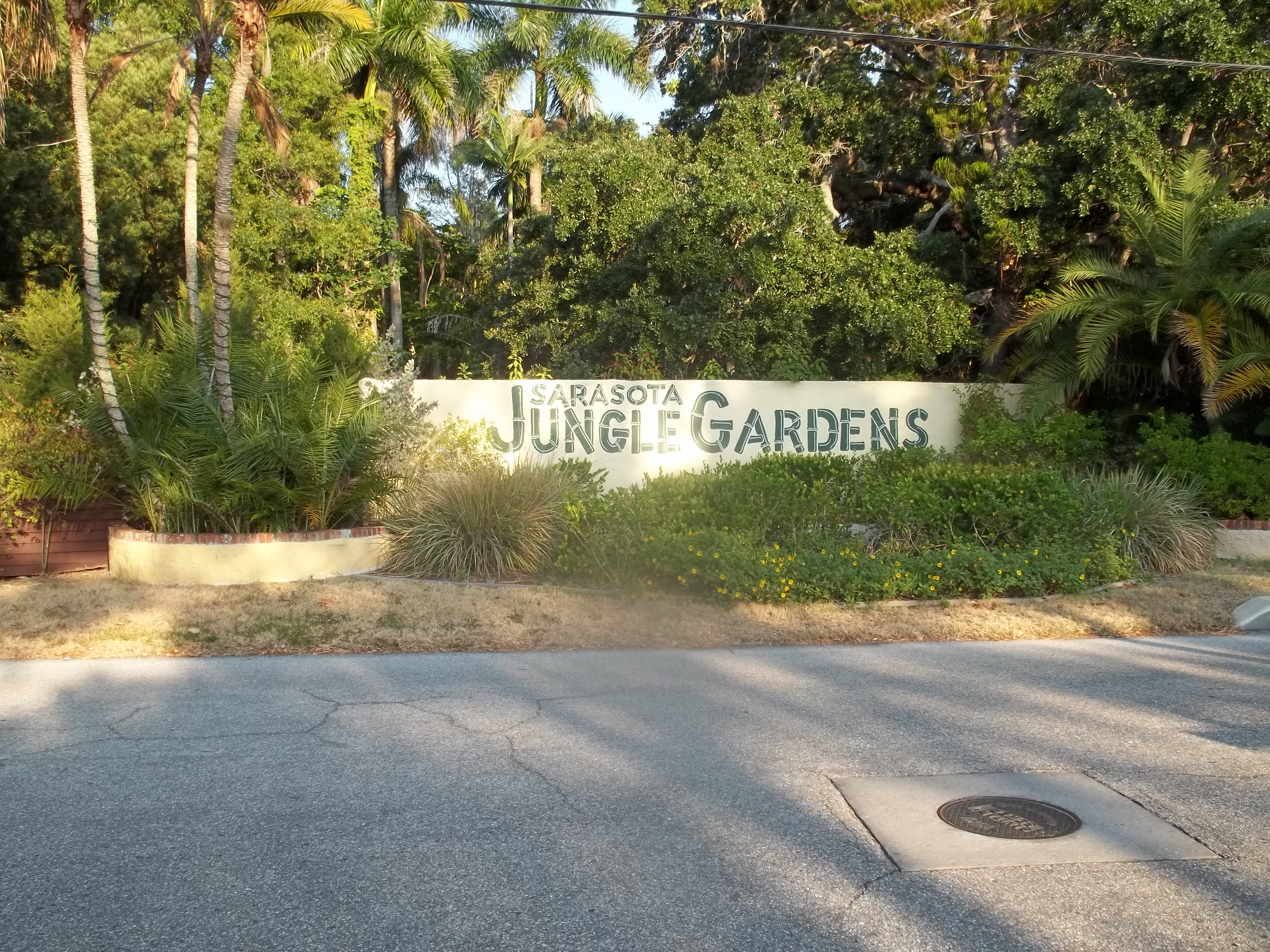

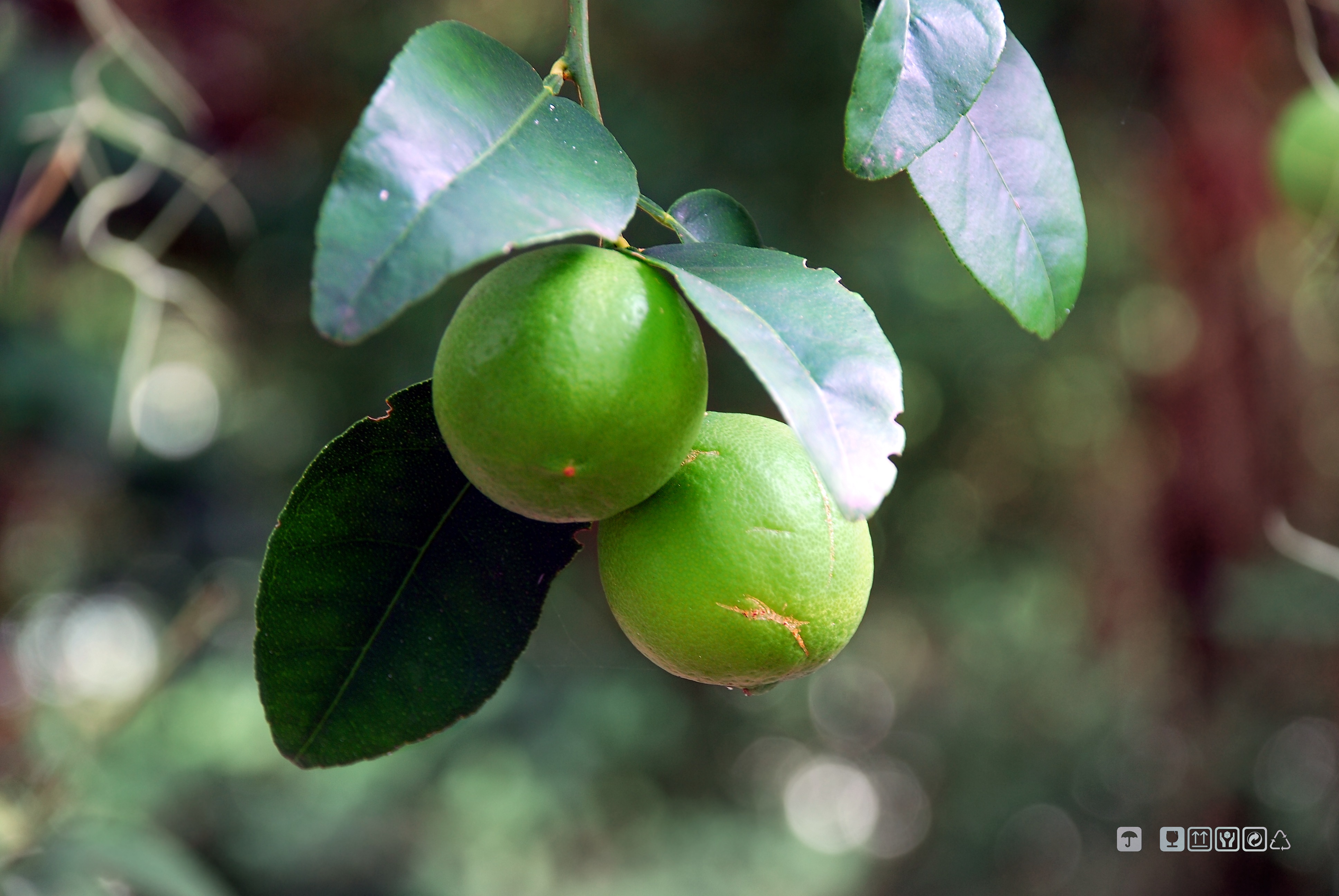

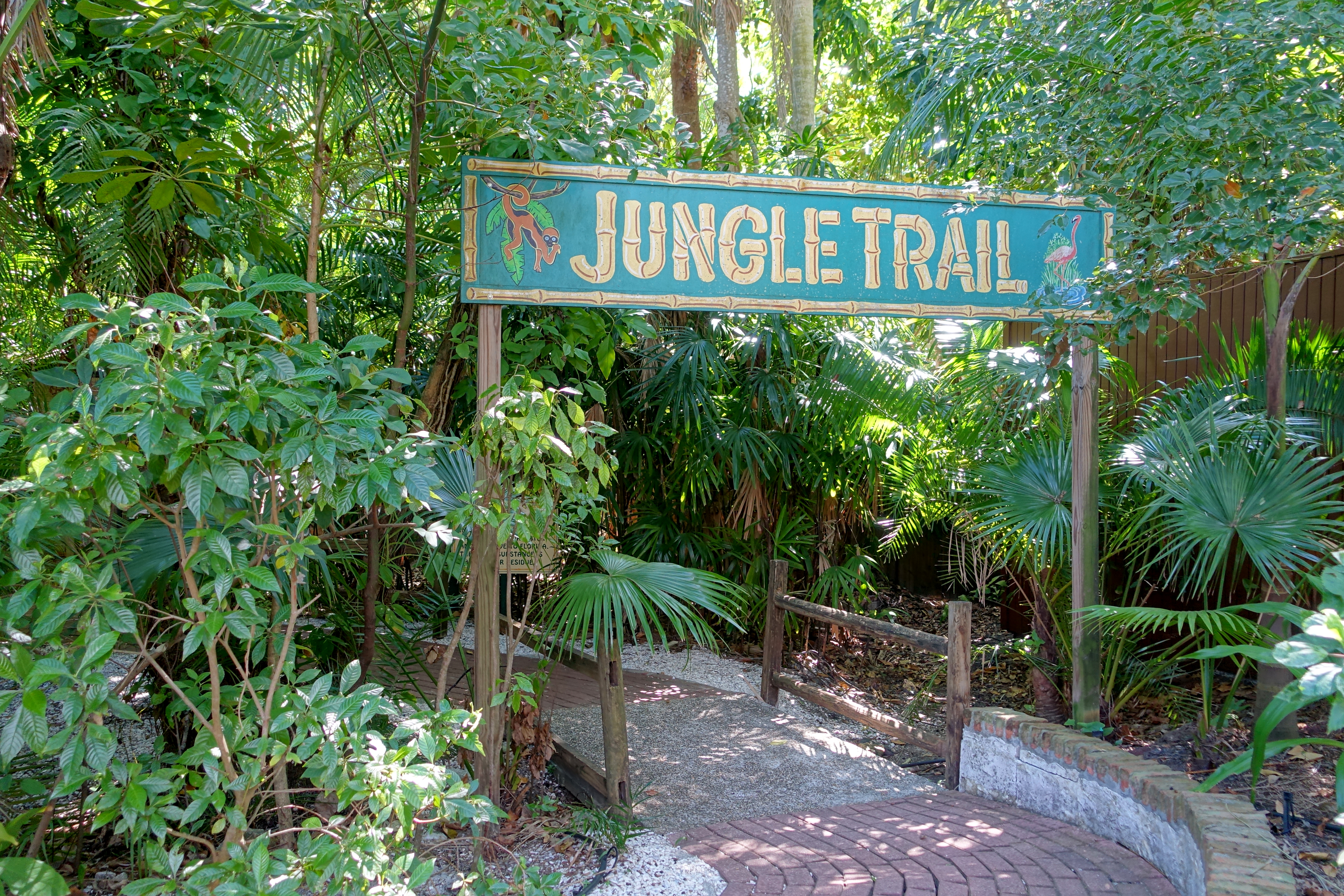

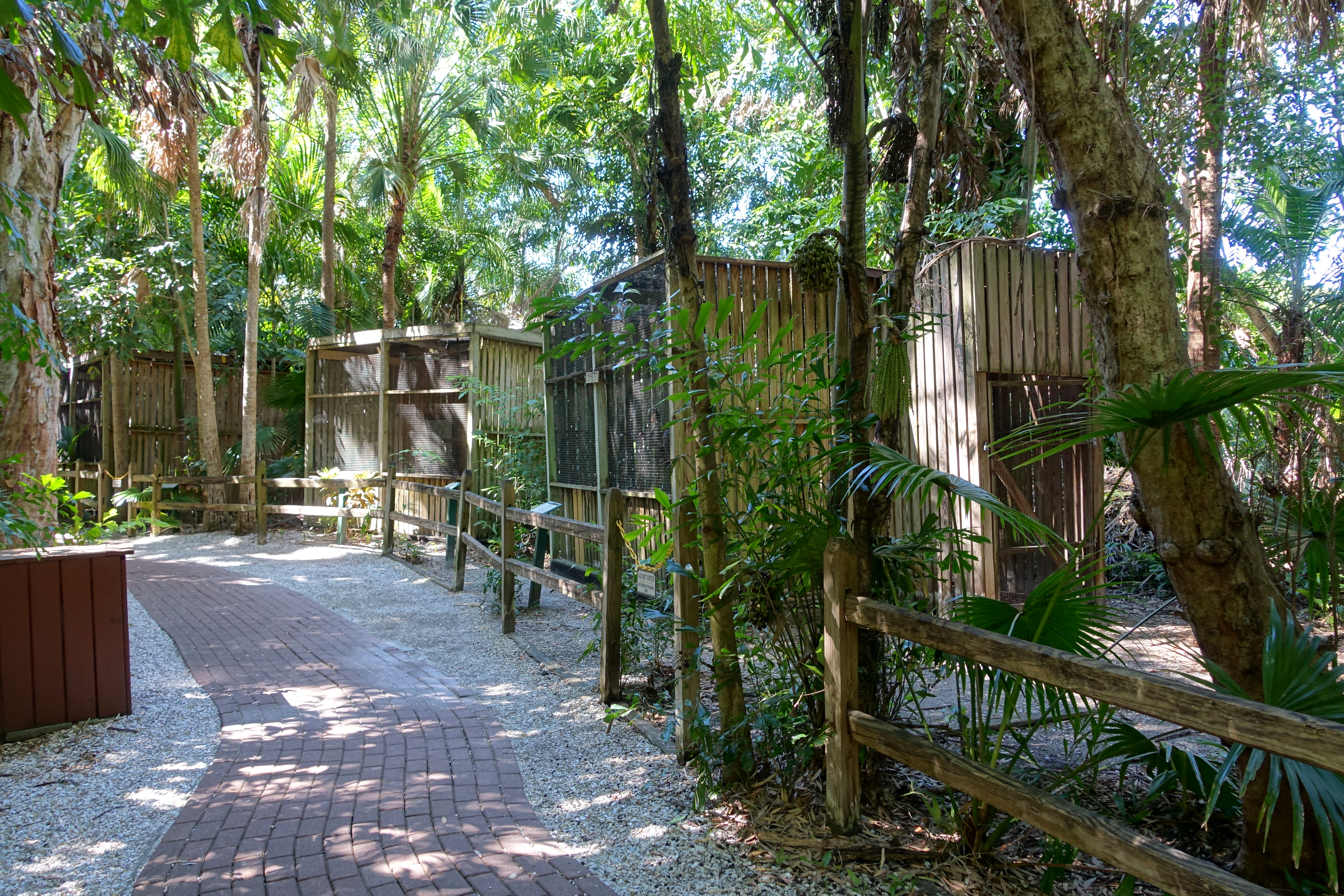

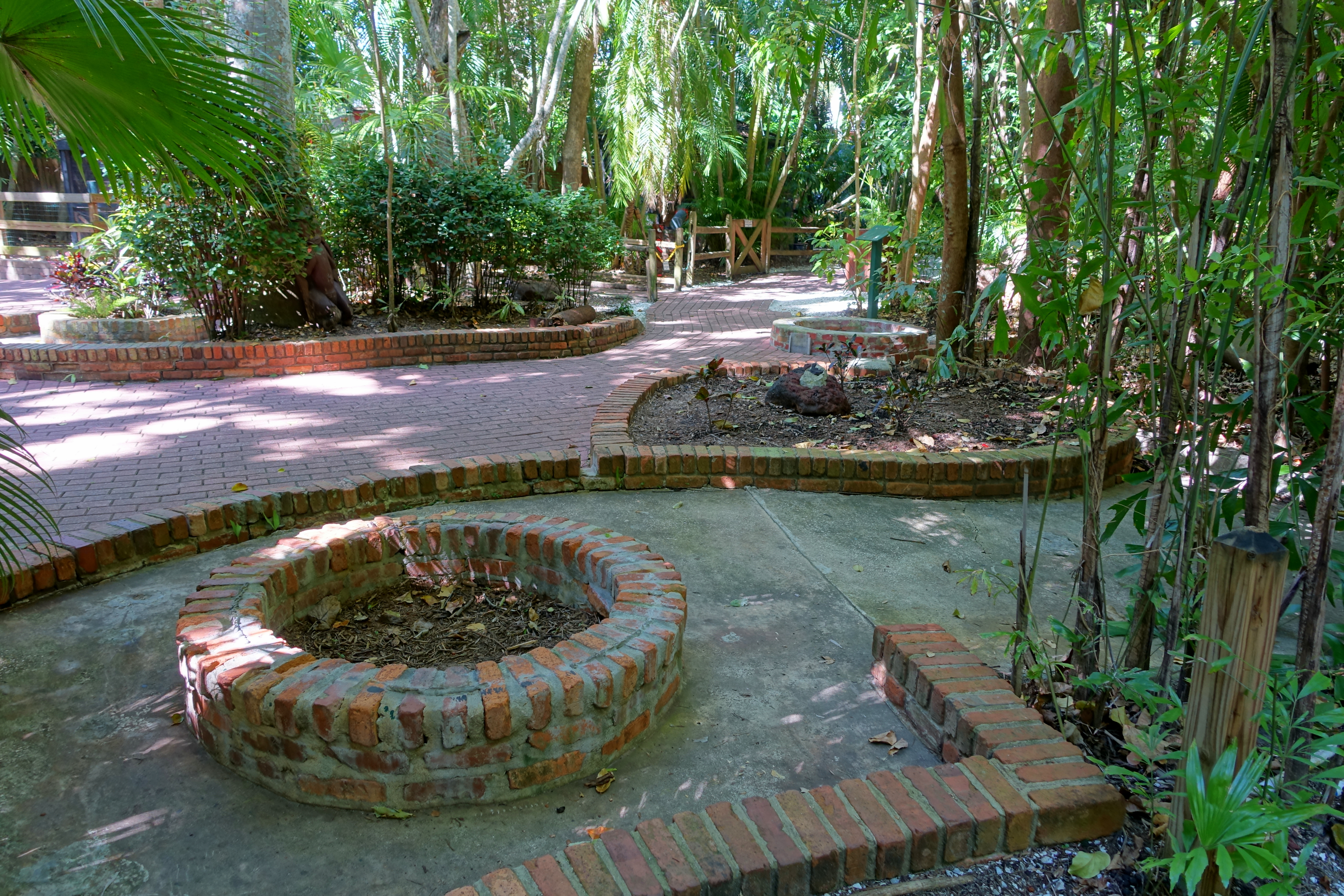
