= Contentment (disambiguation) =

Contentment is an emotional and mental state.

Contentment may also refer to:

- Contentment (Mount Crawford, Virginia), a historic home in Virginia, US
- Contentment (Ansted, West Virginia), a historic home in West Virginia, US
- Contentment, U.S. Virgin Islands, a settlement

== See also ==
- Containment (disambiguation)
