= Containment (disambiguation) =

Containment is a geopolitical strategy to stop the expansion of an enemy.

Containment may also refer to:

- Containment (computer programming), a form of object composition
- Containment (documentary), a 2015 film about the long-term dangers of nuclear waste
- Containment (film), a 2015 British film
- Containment (TV series), a 2016 American series
- "Containment" (Helstrom), an episode of Helstrom
- Containment building, a structure enclosing a nuclear reactor
- Containment (set theory), another term for a subset
- Containment theory in psychoanalysis
- Reckless' containment theory in social control theory
- Domestic containment
- Dual containment
- Concept-containment theory of truth
- Fire containment
- Operation Containment, a police operation against gangs in Brazil
- Radioactive containment, technical measures to prevent radioactive incidents or contamination

== See also ==
- Biocontainment
- Container (disambiguation)
- Contentment (disambiguation)
- Isolation (disambiguation)
- Subversion and containment
