= American social policy during the Second Red Scare =

During its Second Red Scare (1947–1957) a distinct set of domestic policies and conservative social mores came to dominate popular culture and interpersonal relations in the United States.

== The Post–World War II "baby boom" ==
In the aftermath of World War II, the birth rate spiked in the United States as millions of young men were discharged from the armed forces and began to establish new households. This Mid-20th century baby boom significantly increased the number of families in the United States.

Traditional explanations for the rise of this postwar family ideal focus on economic means: The GI bill increased soldiers' access to college education, greatly expanding college enrollment. In 1947, veterans accounted for 49 percent of college admissions. The bill also increased access to low-interest home loans contributing to a large increase in home ownership: from 1944 to 1952, the Veterans Administration “supported nearly 2.4 million home loans for World War II veterans.” However, closer examination shows that many people were left out of this new economic prosperity. Minorities who did not fit the ideal (including racial minorities, feminists, and homosexuals) were suppressed, unable to assert autonomy, and therefore contained.

African American men were eligible for GI Bill’s provisions and home loans, but many were prevented from buying houses in suburban areas because of redlining and other techniques of the racial segregation in the United States.

Other members of society who were excluded from the postwar ideal of middle-class employment and home ownership included, among others, women and Asian Americans. Women who had worked in factories to support the economy during World War II were pressured to leave the workforce and become housewives. Japanese Americans released from the World War II internment camps returned home to find their property confiscated.

== Aspects of post-war social policy ==
- Sexuality: White women were contained to fit a feminine, yet not overtly sexual image. Tight clothes were proscribed for women, including the bikini, named after the Bikini Atoll in the Pacific Ocean, site of nuclear weapon testing. Additionally, homosexuals were viewed as amoral and a security risk by virtue of their manipulability through blackmail.
- Education and employment: White women were discouraged from pursuing higher education and careers. Black women, on the other hand, continued to be confined to low-paying jobs, such as domestic servants who worked for white families. White women often actively contained their black servants by acting like matriarchs over them.
- Space: The suburbs were the ideal home location. The woman's domain was the kitchen.
- Pop culture: Television encouraged the promotion of the patriarchal ideal through family shows like Father Knows Best.
- Children's Gender Roles: Sociologists such as Dr. Benjamin Spock encouraged girls to play with dolls and emulate their mothers. They also promoted the preparation of boys for manhood by encouraging them to play with toy vehicles and role-play policemen or firemen.
- Religion: Regular church attendance was encouraged. Christianity and to a lesser extent Judaism predominated American society. Atheism was discouraged since Communism opposed religion, and Atheists were stereotyped in the media as amoral and cynical.

== See also ==
- McCarthyism
- Domestic containment
