= Red Scare =

Any of several events in which widespread fear of communism or leftism develops

Red Scare is a form of moral panic provoked by fear of the rise of left-wing ideologies in a society, especially communism and socialism. Historically, red scares have led to mass political persecution, scapegoating, and the ousting of those in government positions who have had connections with left-wing movements. The name is derived from the red flag, a common symbol of communism and socialism.

The term is most often used to refer to two periods in the history of the United States. The First Red Scare, which occurred immediately after World War I, revolved around a perceived threat from the American labor movement, anarchist revolution, and political radicalism that followed revolutionary socialist movements in Germany and Russia during the 19th and early 20th centuries.

The Second Red Scare, which occurred immediately after World War II, was preoccupied with the perception that national or foreign communists were infiltrating or subverting American society and the federal government. From 1950, senator Joseph McCarthy played a key role in disseminating those fears.

Following the end of the Cold War, unearthed documents revealed substantial Soviet spy activity in the United States, although many of the agents were never properly identified at the time.

== History ==
=== First Red Scare (1917–1920) ===
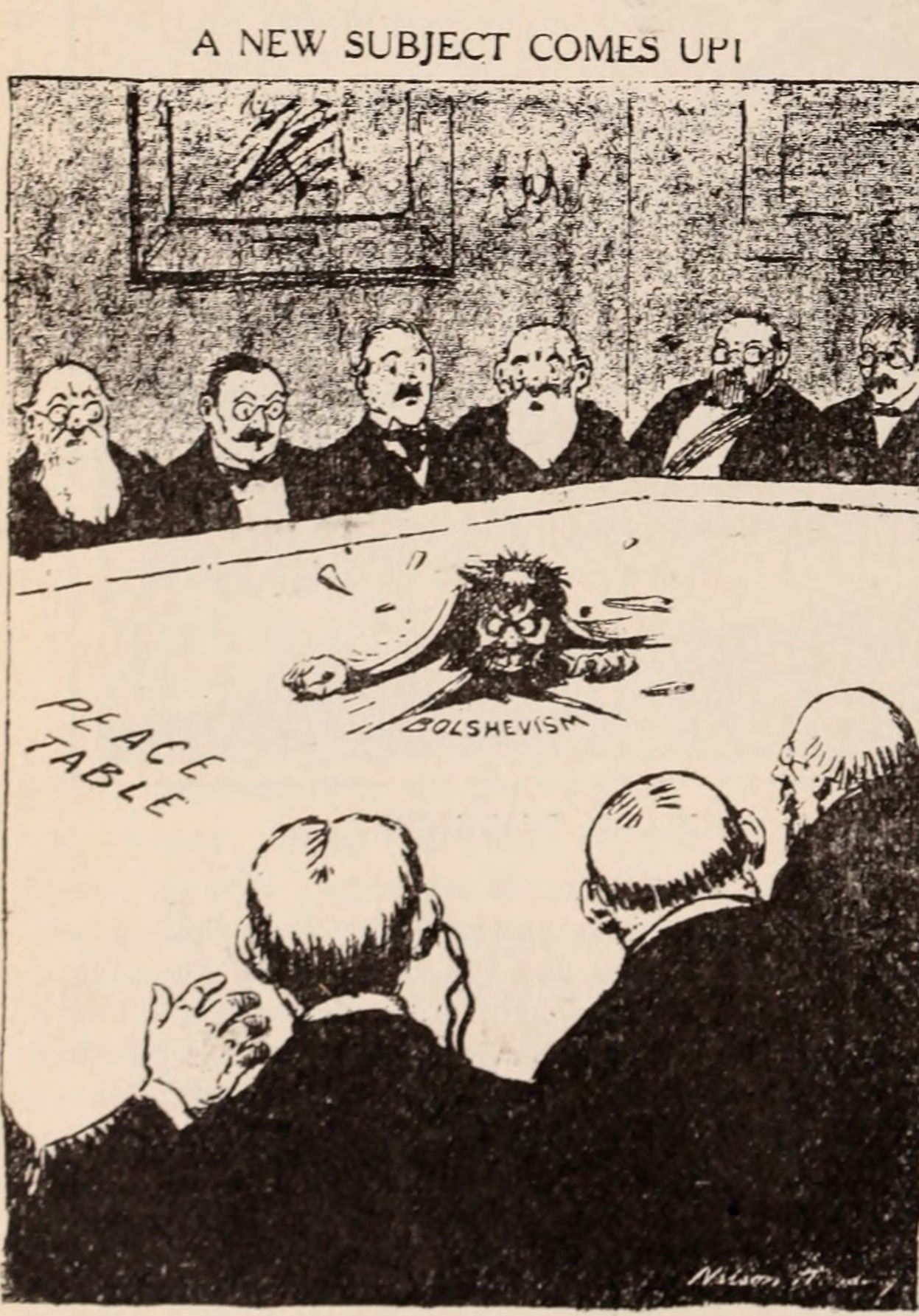
A political cartoon from 1919 depicting the October Revolution's impact on the Paris peace talks

The first Red Scare in the United States accompanied the Russian Revolution (specifically the October Revolution) and the Revolutions of 1917–1923. Citizens of the United States in the years of World War I (1914–1918) were intensely patriotic; anarchist and left-wing social agitation aggravated national, social, and political tensions. Political scientist and former Communist Party USA member Murray Levin wrote that the Red Scare was "a nationwide anti-radical hysteria provoked by a mounting fear and anxiety that a Bolshevik revolution in America was imminent—a revolution that would change Church, home, marriage, civility, and the American way of Life". News media exacerbated such fears, channeling them into anti-foreign sentiment due to the lively debate among recent immigrants from Europe regarding various forms of anarchism as possible solutions to widespread poverty. The Industrial Workers of the World (IWW), also known as the Wobblies, backed several labor strikes in 1916 and 1917. These strikes covered a wide range of industries including steel working, shipbuilding, coal mining, copper mining, and other industries necessary for wartime activities.

After World War I ended (November 1918), the number of strikes increased to record levels in 1919, with more than 3,600 separate strikes by a wide range of workers, e.g., steel workers, railroad shop workers, and the Boston police department. The press portrayed these worker strikes as "radical threats to American society" inspired by "left-wing, foreign agents provocateurs". The IWW and those sympathetic to workers claimed that the press "misrepresented legitimate labor strikes" as "crimes against society", "conspiracies against the government", and "plots to establish communism". Opponents of labor viewed strikes as an extension of the radical, anarchist foundations of the IWW, which contended that all workers should be united as a social class and that capitalism and the wage system should be abolished.

In June 1917, as a response to World War I, Congress passed the Espionage Act to prevent any information relating to national defense from being used to harm the United States or to aid her enemies. The Wilson administration used this act to make anything "urging treason" a "nonmailable matter". Due to the Espionage Act and the then Postmaster General Albert S. Burleson, 74 separate newspapers were not being mailed.

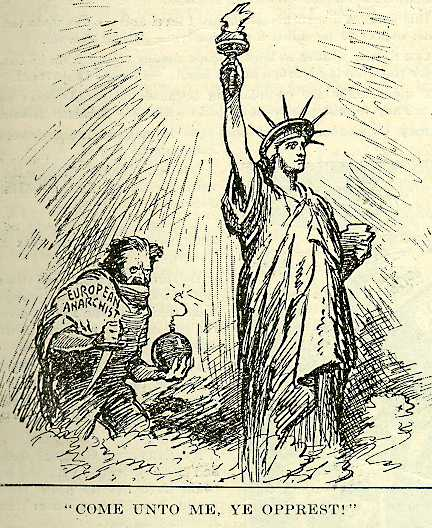
A "European Anarchist" attempts to destroy the Statue of Liberty in this 1919 political cartoon.

In April 1919, authorities discovered a plot for mailing 36 bombs to prominent members of the U.S. political and economic establishment: J. P. Morgan Jr., John D. Rockefeller, Supreme Court Justice Oliver Wendell Holmes, U.S. Attorney General Alexander Mitchell Palmer, and immigration officials. On 2 June 1919, in eight cities, eight bombs exploded simultaneously. One target was the Washington, D.C., house of U.S. Attorney General Palmer, where the explosion killed the bomber, who (evidence indicated) was an Italian-American radical from Philadelphia, Pennsylvania. Afterwards, Palmer ordered the U.S. Justice Department to launch the Palmer Raids (1919–21). He deported 249 Russian immigrants on the "Soviet Ark", formed the General Intelligence Unit – a precursor to the Federal Bureau of Investigation (FBI) – within the Department of Justice, and used federal agents to jail more than 5,000 citizens and to search homes without respecting their constitutional rights.

In 1918, before the bombings, President Woodrow Wilson had pressured Congress to legislate the anti-anarchist Sedition Act of 1918 to protect wartime morale by deporting putatively undesirable political people. Law professor David D. Cole reports that President Wilson's "federal government consistently targeted alien radicals, deporting them... for their speech or associations, making little effort to distinguish terrorists from ideological dissidents". President Wilson used the Sedition Act of 1918 to limit the exercise of free speech by criminalizing language deemed disloyal to the United States government.

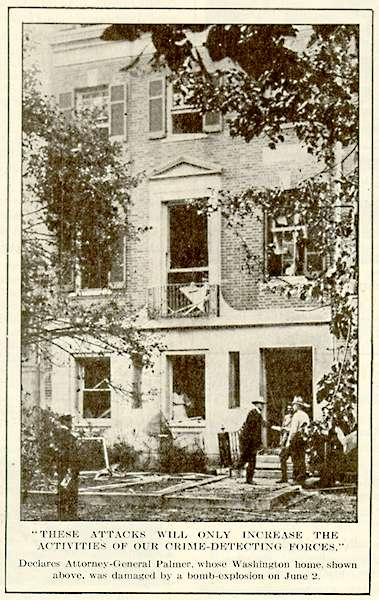
A bomb blast badly damaged the residence of Attorney General Mitchell Palmer in the spring of 1919.

Initially, the press praised the raids; The Washington Post stated: "There is no time to waste on hairsplitting over [the] infringement of liberty", and The New York Times wrote that the injuries inflicted upon the arrested were "souvenirs of the new attitude of aggressiveness which had been assumed by the Federal agents against Reds and suspected Reds". In the event, twelve publicly prominent lawyers characterized the Palmer Raids as unconstitutional. The critics included future Supreme Court Justice Felix Frankfurter, who published Report Upon the Illegal Practices of the United States Department of Justice, documenting systematic violations of the Fourth, Fifth, Sixth, and Eighth Amendments to the U.S. Constitution via Palmer-authorized "illegal acts" and "wanton violence". Defensively, Palmer then warned that a government-deposing left-wing revolution would begin on 1 May 1920—May Day, the International Workers' Day. When it failed to happen, he was ridiculed and lost much credibility. Strengthening the legal criticism of Palmer was that fewer than 600 deportations were substantiated with evidence, out of the thousands of resident aliens arrested and deported. In July 1920, Palmer's once-promising Democratic Party bid for the U.S. presidency failed. Wall Street was bombed on 16 September 1920, near Federal Hall National Memorial and the JP Morgan Bank. Although both anarchists and communists were suspected as being responsible for the bombing, ultimately no individuals were indicted for the bombing, in which 38 died and 141 were injured.

In 1919–20, several states enacted "criminal syndicalism" laws outlawing advocacy of violence in effecting and securing social change. The restrictions included limitations on free speech. Passage of these laws, in turn, provoked aggressive police investigation of the accused persons, their jailing, and deportation for being suspected of being either communist or left-wing. Regardless of ideological gradation, the Red Scare did not distinguish between communism, anarchism, socialism, or social democracy. This aggressive crackdown on certain ideologies resulted in many Supreme Court cases over free speech. In the 1919 case of Schenck v. United States, the Supreme Court, introducing the clear-and-present-danger test, effectively deemed the Espionage Act of 1917 and the Sedition Act of 1918 constitutional.

=== Second Red Scare (1940s–1950s) ===
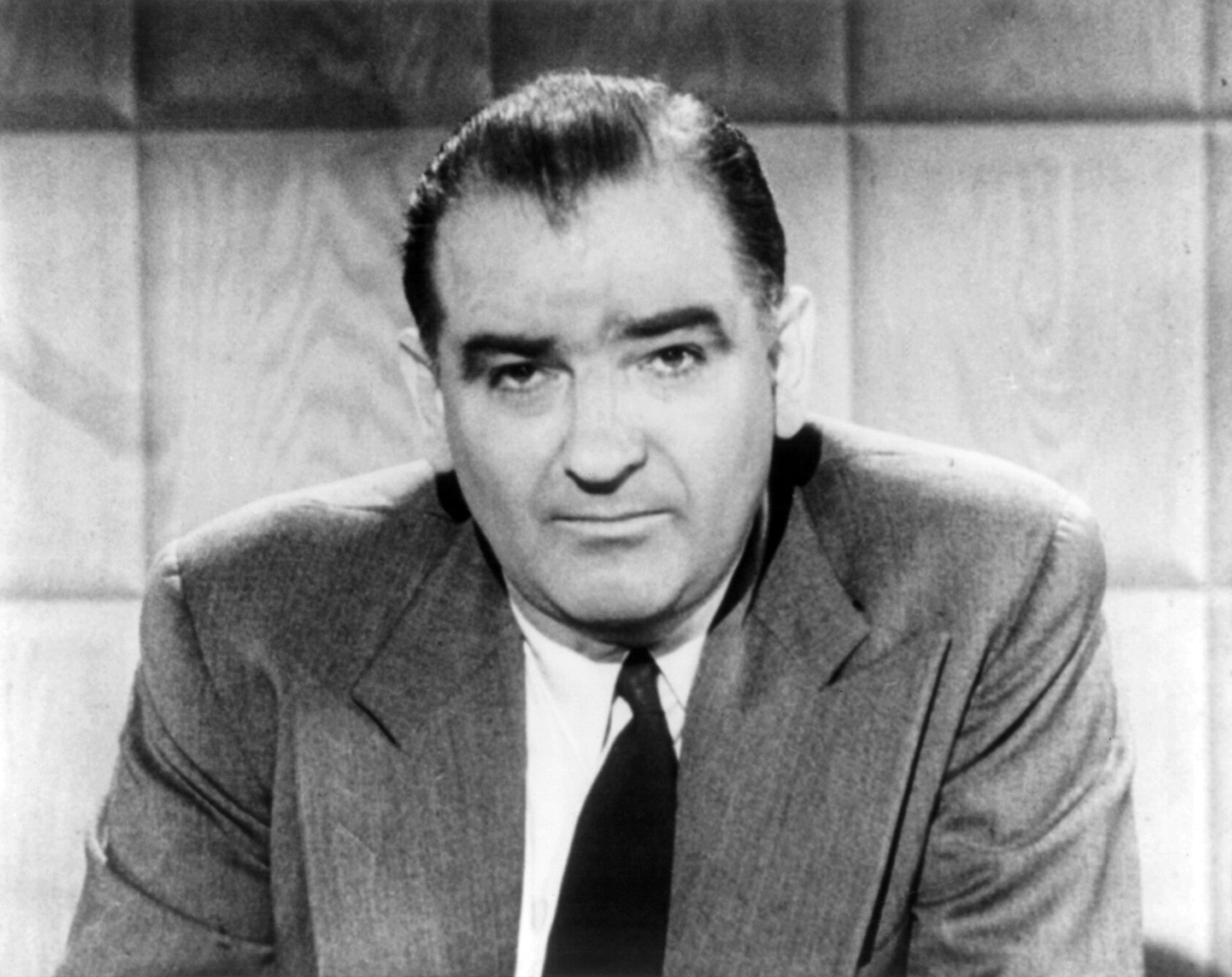
Senator Joseph McCarthy, namesake of McCarthyism

The second Red Scare occurred after World War II (1939–1945), and is known as "McCarthyism" after its best-known advocate, Senator Joseph McCarthy. McCarthyism coincided with an increased and widespread fear of communist espionage that was the consequence of the increasing tension in the Cold War through the Soviet occupation of Eastern Europe, the Berlin Blockade (1948–49), the end of the Chinese Civil War, the confessions of spying for the Soviet Union that were made by several high-ranking U.S. government officials, and the outbreak of the Korean War.

==== Internal causes of the anti-communist fear ====
The events of the late 1940s, the early 1950s—the trial of Ethel and Julius Rosenberg (1953), the trial of Alger Hiss, the Iron Curtain (1945–1991) around Eastern Europe, and the Soviet Union's first nuclear weapon test in 1949 (RDS-1)—surprised the American public, influencing popular opinion about U.S. national security, which, in turn, was connected to the fear that the Soviet Union would drop nuclear bombs on the United States, and fear of the Communist Party of the United States of America (CPUSA).

In Canada, the 1946 Kellock–Taschereau Commission investigated espionage after top-secret documents concerning RDX, radar and other weapons were handed over to the Soviets by a domestic spy-ring.

At the House Un-American Activities Committee, former CPUSA members and NKVD spies, Elizabeth Bentley and Whittaker Chambers, testified that Soviet spies and communist sympathizers had penetrated the U.S. government before, during and after World War II. Other U.S. citizen spies confessed to their acts of espionage in situations where the statute of limitations on prosecuting them had run out. In 1949, anti-communist fear, and fear of American traitors, was aggravated by the Chinese Communists winning the Chinese Civil War against the Western-sponsored Kuomintang, their founding of the Communist China, and later Chinese intervention (October–December 1950) in the Korean War (1950–1953) against U.S. ally South Korea.

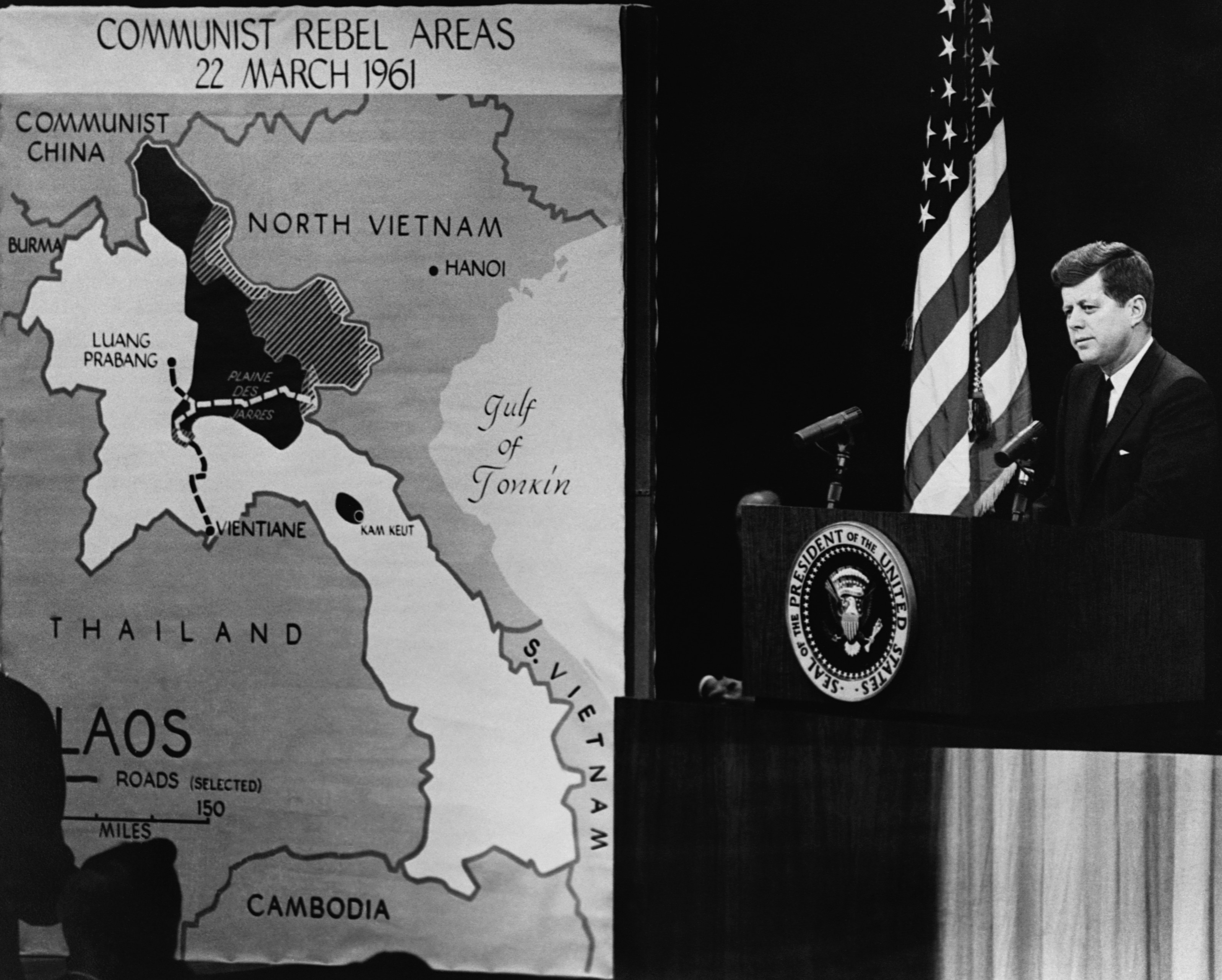
President John F. Kennedy's news conference in March 1961

A few of the events during the Red Scare were also due to a power struggle between the director of the FBI, J. Edgar Hoover, and the Central Intelligence Agency. Hoover had instigated and aided some of the investigations of members of the CIA with "leftist" history, like Cord Meyer. This conflict could also be traced back to the conflict between Hoover and William J. Donovan, going back to the first Red Scare, but especially during World War II. Donovan ran the OSS (CIA's predecessor). They had differing opinions on the nature of the alliance with the Soviet Union, conflicts over jurisdiction, conflicts of personality, the OSS hiring of communists and criminals as agents, etc.

Historian Richard Powers distinguishes two main forms of anti-communism during the period, liberal anti-communism and countersubversive anti-communism. The countersubversives, he argues, derived from a pre-WWII isolationist tradition on the right. Liberal anti-communists believed that political debate was enough to show Communists as disloyal and irrelevant, while countersubversive anticommunists believed that Communists had to be exposed and punished. At times, countersubversive anticommunists accused liberals of being "equally destructive" as Communists due to an alleged lack of religious values or supposed "red web" infiltration into the New Deal.

Much evidence for Soviet espionage existed, according to Democratic Senator and historian Daniel Moynihan, with the Venona project consisting of "overwhelming proof of the activities of Soviet spy networks in America, complete with names, dates, places, and deeds." However, Moynihan argued that because sources like the Venona project were kept secret for so long, "ignorant armies clashed by night". With McCarthy advocating an extremist view, the discussion of communist subversion was made into a civil rights issue instead of a counterintelligence one. This historiographical perspective is shared by historians John Earl Haynes and Robert Louis Benson. While President Truman formulated the Truman Doctrine against Soviet expansion, it is possible he was not fully informed of the Venona intercepts, leaving him unaware of the domestic extent of espionage, according to Moynihan and Benson.

==== Early years ====
By the 1930s, communism had become an attractive economic ideology, particularly among labor leaders and intellectuals. By 1939, the CPUSA had about 50,000 members. In 1940, soon after World War II began in Europe, the U.S. Congress legislated the Alien Registration Act (also known as the Smith Act, 18 USC § 2385) making it a crime to "knowingly or willfully advocate, abet, advise or teach the duty, necessity, desirability or propriety of overthrowing the Government of the United States or of any State by force or violence, or for anyone to organize any association which teaches, advises or encourages such an overthrow, or for anyone to become a member of or to affiliate with any such association"—and required Federal registration of all foreign nationals. Although principally deployed against communists, the Smith Act was also used against right-wing political threats such as the German-American Bund, and the perceived racial disloyalty of the Japanese-American population (cf. hyphenated-Americans).

==== World War II (1939–1945) ====
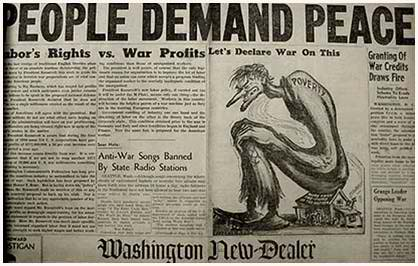
The Washington Commonwealth Federation newspaper after the signing of the Molotov-Ribbentrop pact (original scan)

After the Soviet Union signed the non-aggression Molotov–Ribbentrop Pact with Nazi Germany on 23 August 1939, negative attitudes towards communists in the United States were on the rise. While the American communist party at first attacked Germany for its 1 September 1939 invasion of western Poland, on 11 September it received a blunt directive from Moscow denouncing the Polish government. On 17 September, the Soviet Union invaded eastern Poland and occupied the Polish territory assigned to it by the Molotov–Ribbentrop Pact, followed by co-ordination with German forces in Poland. The CPUSA turned the focus of its public activities from anti-fascism to advocating peace, not only opposing military preparations, but also condemning those opposed to Hitler. The party did not at first attack President Roosevelt, reasoning that this could devastate American Communism, blaming instead Roosevelt's advisors.

On 30 November, when the Soviet Union attacked Finland and after forced mutual assistance pacts from Estonia, Latvia and Lithuania, the Communist Party considered Russian security sufficient justification to support the actions. Secret short wave radio broadcasts in October from Comintern leader Georgi Dimitrov ordered CPUSA leader Earl Browder to change the party's support for Roosevelt. On 23 October, the party began attacking Roosevelt. The party was active in the isolationist America First Committee. The CPUSA also dropped its boycott of Nazi goods, spread the slogans "The Yanks Are Not Coming" and "Hands Off", set up a "perpetual peace vigil" across the street from the White House and announced that Roosevelt was the head of the "war party of the American bourgeoisie". By April 1940, the party Daily Worker's line seemed not so much antiwar as simply pro-German. A pamphlet stated the Jews had just as much to fear from Britain and France as they did Germany. In August 1940, after NKVD agent Ramón Mercader killed Trotsky with an ice axe, Browder perpetuated Moscow's fiction that the killer, who had been dating one of Trotsky's secretaries, was a disillusioned follower.

In allegiance to the Soviet Union, the party changed this policy again after Hitler broke the Molotov–Ribbentrop Pact by attacking the Soviet Union on 22 June 1941. The CPUSA opposed labor strikes in the weapons industry and supporting the U.S. war effort against the Axis powers. With the slogan "Communism is Twentieth-Century Americanism", the chairman, Earl Browder, advertised the CPUSA's integration to the political mainstream. In contrast, the Trotskyist Socialist Workers Party (SWP) opposed U.S. participation in the war and supported labor strikes, even in the war-effort industry. For this reason, James P. Cannon and other SWP leaders were convicted per the Smith Act.

==== Increasing tension (1945–1954) ====
In March 1947, President Harry S. Truman signed Executive Order 9835, creating the "Federal Employees Loyalty Program" establishing political-loyalty review boards who determined the "Americanism" of Federal Government employees, and requiring that all federal employees to take an oath of loyalty to the United States government. It then recommended termination of those who had confessed to spying for the Soviet Union, as well as some suspected of being "Un-American". This led to more than 2,700 dismissals and 12,000 resignations from the years 1947 to 1956. It also was the template for several state legislatures' loyalty acts, such as California's Levering Act. The House Committee on Un-American Activities was created during the Truman administration as a response to allegations by Republicans of disloyalty in Truman's administration. The House Committee on Un-American Activities (HUAC) and the committees of Senator Joseph McCarthy (R., Wisc.) conducted character investigations of "American communists" (actual and alleged), and their roles in (real and imaginary) espionage, propaganda, and subversion favoring the Soviet Union—in the process revealing the extraordinary breadth of the Soviet spy network in infiltrating the federal government. The process also launched the successful political careers of Richard Nixon and Robert F. Kennedy, as well as that of Joseph McCarthy. The HUAC held a large interest in investigating those in the entertainment industry in Hollywood. They interrogated actors, writers, and producers. The people who cooperated in the investigations got to continue working as they had been, but people who refused to cooperate were blacklisted. Critics of the HUAC claim their tactics were an abuse of government power and resulted in a witch hunt that disregarded citizens’ rights and ruined their careers and reputations. Critics claim the internal witch hunt was a use for personal gain to spread influence for government officials by intensifying the fear of Communists infiltrating the country. Supporters, however, believe the actions of the HUAC were justified given the level of threat Communism posed to democracy in the United States.

Senator McCarthy stirred up further fear in the United States of communists infiltrating the country by saying that communist spies were omnipresent, and he was America's only salvation, using this fear to increase his own influence. In 1950 Joseph McCarthy addressed the senate, citing 81 separate cases, and made accusations against suspected communists. Although he provided little or no evidence, this prompted the Senate to call for a full investigation.

Senator Pat McCarran (D., Nev.) introduced the McCarran Internal Security Act of 1950 that was passed by the U.S. Congress and which modified a great deal of law to restrict civil liberties in the name of security. President Truman declared the act a "mockery of the Bill of Rights" and a "long step toward totalitarianism" because it represented a government restriction on the freedom of opinion. He vetoed the act but his veto was overridden by Congress. Much of the bill eventually was repealed.

The formal establishment of the People's Republic of China in 1949 and the beginning of the Korean War in 1950 meant that Asian Americans, especially those of Chinese or Korean descent, came under increasing suspicion by both American civilians and government officials of being Communist sympathizers. Simultaneously, some American politicians saw the prospect of American-educated Chinese students bringing their knowledge back to "Red China" as an unacceptable threat to American national security, and laws such as the China Aid Act of 1950 and the Refugee Relief Act of 1953 gave significant assistance to Chinese students who wished to settle in the United States. Despite being naturalized, however, Chinese immigrants continued to face suspicion of their allegiance. The general effect, according to University of Wisconsin-Madison scholar Qing Liu, was to simultaneously demand that Chinese (and other Asian) students politically support the American government yet avoid engaging directly in politics.

The Second Red Scare profoundly altered the temper of American society. Its later characterizations may be seen as contributory to works of feared communist espionage, such as the film My Son John (1952), about parents' suspicions their son is a spy. Abundant accounts in narrative forms contained themes of the infiltration, subversion, invasion, and destruction of American society by un–American thought. Even a baseball team, the Cincinnati Reds, temporarily renamed themselves the "Cincinnati Redlegs" to avoid the money-losing and career-ruining connotations inherent in being ball-playing "Reds" (communists). In 1954, Congress passed the Communist Control Act of 1954, which prevented members of the communist party in America from holding office in labor unions and other labor organizations.

==== Wind down (1954–1957) ====
Examining the political controversies of the 1940s and 1950s, historian John Earl Haynes, who studied the Venona decryptions extensively, argued that Joseph McCarthy's attempts to "make anti-communism a partisan weapon" actually "threatened [the post-War] anti-Communist consensus", thereby ultimately harming anti-communist efforts more than helping them. Meanwhile, the "shockingly high level" of infiltration by Soviet agents during WWII had largely dissipated by 1950. Liberal anti-communists like Edward Shils and Daniel Moynihan had contempt for McCarthyism, and Moynihan argued that McCarthy's overreaction distracted from the "real (but limited) extent of Soviet espionage in America." In 1950, President Harry Truman called Joseph McCarthy "the greatest asset the Kremlin has."

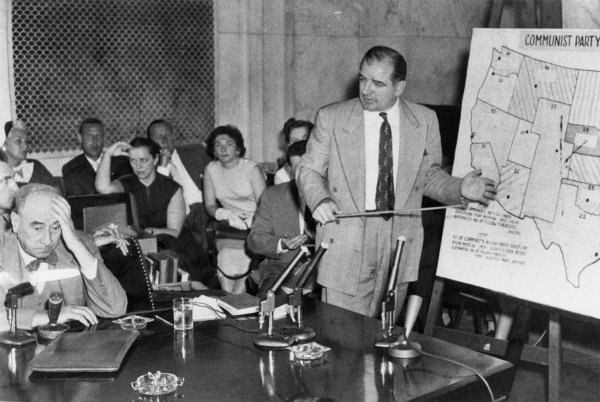
Senator Joseph McCarthy (right) with a map of Communist Party organizations, 1954

In 1954, after accusing the army, including war heroes, Senator Joseph McCarthy lost credibility in the eyes of the American public and the Army-McCarthy Hearings were held in the summer of 1954. He was formally censured by his colleagues in Congress and the hearings led by McCarthy came to a close. After the Senate formally censured McCarthy, his political standing and power were significantly diminished, and much of the tension surrounding the idea of a possible communist takeover died down.

From 1955 through 1959, the Supreme Court made several decisions which restricted the ways in which the government could enforce its anti-communist policies, some of which included limiting the federal loyalty program to only those who had access to sensitive information, allowing defendants to face their accusers, reducing the strength of congressional investigation committees, and weakening the Smith Act. In the 1957 case Yates v. United States and the 1961 case Scales v. United States, the Supreme Court limited Congress's ability to circumvent the First Amendment, and in 1967 during the Supreme Court case United States v. Robel, the Supreme Court ruled that a ban on communists in the defense industry was unconstitutional.

In 1995, the American government declassified details of the Venona Project following the Moynihan Commission, which when combined with the opening of the USSR Comintern archives, provided substantial validation of intelligence gathering, outright spying, and policy influencing, by Americans on behalf of the Soviet Union, from 1940 through 1980. Over 300 American communists, whether they knew it or not, including government officials and technicians that helped in developing the atom bomb, were found to have engaged in espionage. This allegedly included some pro-Soviet capitalists, such as economist Harry Dexter White, and communist businessman David Karr.

== New Red Scare ==
According to The New York Times in 2019, China's growing military and economic power has resulted in a "New Red Scare" in the United States. Both Democrats and Republicans have expressed anti-China sentiment. According to The Economist, the New Red Scare has caused the American and Chinese governments to "increasingly view Chinese students with suspicion" on American college campuses.

The fourth iteration of the Committee on the Present Danger, a United States foreign policy interest group, was established on 25 March 2019, branding itself Committee on the Present Danger: China (CPDC). The CPDC has been criticized as promoting a revival of Red Scare politics in the United States, and for its ties to conspiracy theorist Frank Gaffney and conservative activist Steve Bannon. David Skidmore, writing for The Diplomat, saw it as another instance of "adolescent hysteria" in American diplomacy, as another of the "fevered crusades [which] have produced some of the costliest mistakes in American foreign policy". Between 2000 and 2023, there were 224 reported instances of Chinese espionage directed at the United States.

In 2026, scholars began to use the terms "New Red Scare" and "Third Red Scare" to refer to Donald Trump's recent campaign against his political opponents, most notably the Democratic Socialists of America and New York Mayor Zohran Mamdani.

== Outside the United States ==
The American Red Scares, combined with the general atmosphere of the Cold War, had a marked influence on other Anglophone countries. Anticommunist paranoia occurred in Australia, Canada, and the United Kingdom. In other parts of the world, such as Indonesia, fear and loathing of communism has escalated to the level of political violence.

== See also ==
- American social policy during the Second Red Scare
- China threat theory
- Church Committee
- Cold War
- The Crucible
- Democratic backsliding in the United States
- Espionage Act of 1917
- Eugene Debs and Debs v. United States
- Fear mongering
- Foley Square trial
- History of Soviet espionage in the United States
- Hollywood blacklist
- Jencks Act
- Jencks v. United States
- Kellock–Taschereau Commission
- Lavender Scare
- McCarthyism
- Moral panic
- Pentagon military analyst program
- Propaganda in the United States
- Psychological operations (United States)
- The Reagan Doctrine
- The Red Decade
- Red-tagging in the Philippines
- Rooi gevaar ("red danger" in Afrikaans)
- Subversive Activities Control Board
- Tankie
- Terruqueo
- US intervention in Latin America
- White Terror (Taiwan)
- Witch-hunt
- Yellow Peril
