= Commissioner v. Kowalski =

- Supreme Court of the United States

Argued October 12, 1977 Decided November 29, 1977
- Full case name: Commissioner of Internal Revenue v. Kowalski, et ux.
- Citations: 434 U.S. 77 (more) 98 S. Ct. 315; 54 L. Ed. 2d 252

Holding
- §119 was intended to exclude meals received "in kind," and so does not exclude cash reimbursements for meals like the one in question.

Court membership
- Chief Justice Warren E. Burger Associate Justices William J. Brennan Jr. · Potter Stewart; Byron White · Thurgood Marshall; Harry Blackmun · Lewis F. Powell Jr. William Rehnquist · John P. Stevens

Case opinions
- Majority: Brennan, joined by Stewart, White, Marshall, Powell, Rehnquist, Stevens
- Dissent: Blackmun, joined by Burger

Laws applied
- Internal Revenue Code § 119

Commissioner v. Kowalski, 434 U.S. 77 (1977), is a decision of the United States Supreme Court relating to taxation of meals furnished by an employer. In this case, the Court interpreted Internal Revenue Code §119(a)-(b)(4) and (d) and Treas. Reg. §1.119-1.

Most notably, the Court held that:

- §119 was intended to exclude meals received "in kind," and so does not exclude cash reimbursements for meals like the one in question.

== Facts ==
The State of New Jersey instituted a cash meal allowance for its state police officers in July 1949. Before that, troopers were provided a mid-shift meal at one of several meal stations located throughout the State. The State had decided that this system was unsatisfactory, as it required troopers to leave their patrol areas unattended for extended periods of time. The new system provided troopers with a cash allowance, which troopers could use to purchase a meal at a location within their patrol area, thus making it unnecessary for them to leave the area unmonitored.

The meal allowance was paid bi-weekly in advance and was included, although separately, with a troopers salary. The money was also separately accounted for in the State's accounting system, and funds from the meal allowance account were never mixed with the salary accounts. Troopers were not required to spend the allowance on mid-shift meals, nor were they required to account for the manner in which the money was spent. This meant that troopers were allowed to eat at home if their home was within their patrol area, or to bring a meal with them to eat in or near their patrol cars.

Kowalski, a state trooper, reported wages for 1970 that included only a portion of his meal allowances (he included $326.45, which omitted $1,371.09 in allowances). The Commissioner believed that this amount should have been included in income, and determined a tax deficiency. Kowalski argued that the cash meal allowance was not compensatory, but was furnished for the convenience of the employer and therefore wasn't income under I.R.C. §61(a), and that alternatively, it was excluded under I.R.C. §119.

== Issue ==
When Kowalski's employer designated a cash payment as a meal allowance:

- Is that payment excludable from gross income under §61(a) of the Internal Revenue Code of 1954, 26 U.S.C. §61(a)?
- If not, is it excludable under §119 of the Code, 26 U.S.C. §119?

== Holding ==
Justice Brennan, writing for the majority, first swiftly ruled out the possibility that the meal allowances payments are not "income" under §61(a): Commissioner v. Glenshaw Glass Co. defines income as all clearly realized accessions to wealth except where expressly excluded. The Court then rejected Kowalski's two arguments for why I.R.C. §119 would expressly exclude the cash meal allowance.

=== Reasoning ===
§119 was intended to exclude only meals in kind. The Court found that Congress intended the exclusion to refer only to meals furnished in-kind.

- By its own terms, the text of this section applied only to "meals"—not "cash" reimbursements for meals. (The statute excludes "the value of any meals ... furnished to [an employee] by his employer for the convenience of the employer, but only if ... the meals are furnished on the business premises of the employer.")
- According to Senate Report No. 1622 (1954), "Section 119 applies only to meals ... in kind ... Any cash allowances for meals ... received by an employee will continue to be includable to the extent that such allowances constitute compensation."

§119 was intended to end the confusion of the common law "Convenience of the Employer" doctrine. The Court rejected the argument that §119 incorporated the doctrinal exclusion for benefits that were noncompensatory (or for the convenience of the employer) under lower court and administrative rulings. According to the Court, the drafting process of §119 shows that Congress intended to "end the confusion as to the tax status of meals and lodging furnished an employee by his employer" under prior law. Section 119 "must therefore be construed as its draftsmen obviously intended it to be—as a replacement for the prior law, designed to "end its confusion."

== Dissent ==
Justice Blackmun, joined by Chief Justice Burger, disagreed with the Court's conclusion that the payments did not fall under the exception in I.R.C. §119. Specifically, Blackmun disputed that the statute was as clear and distinct as the majority's opinion suggested. Furthermore, Blackmun argued that the trooper's employer was the State of New Jersey, and therefore his business premise was "wherever the trooper is on duty in that State."

He concluded,

I fear that state troopers the country over, not handsomely paid to begin with, will never understand today's decision. And I doubt that their reading of the Court's opinion – if indeed, a layman can be expected to understand its technical wording – will convince them that the situation is as clear as the Court purports to find it.

== See also ==
- United States v. Correll - A 1967 Supreme Court decision on when meals count as a business expense for tax deductions.
- List of United States Supreme Court cases, volume 434
