= List of United States Supreme Court cases, volume 389 =

This is a list of all the United States Supreme Court cases from volume 389 of the United States Reports:

Case name	Citation	Date decided
Bohannan v. Arizona ex rel. Smith	389 U.S. 1	1967
Brenner v. Hofstetter	389 U.S. 5	1967
Kelly v. Lane	389 U.S. 5	1967
TV Pix, Inc. v. Allard	389 U.S. 6	1967
Strickland v. Mississippi	389 U.S. 6	1967
Petronia v. Alaska	389 U.S. 7	1967
Morgan v. Alabama	389 U.S. 7	1967
Lattimer v. Crystal Clear, Inc.	389 U.S. 8	1967
American Inst. of Planners v. N.J. Bd. of Professional Planners	389 U.S. 8	1967
Nelles v. Bartlett	389 U.S. 9	1967
Watson v. Maine Comm'r of Banking	389 U.S. 9	1967
Hamrick v. Alabama	389 U.S. 10	1967
Smith v. Arizona	389 U.S. 10	1967
Rhoades v. School District of Abington	389 U.S. 11	1967
Hohensee v. Minear	389 U.S. 11	1967
Cobb v. Georgia	389 U.S. 12	1967
Phillips v. Indiana	389 U.S. 12	1967
Troutt v. Carl K. Wilson Co.	389 U.S. 13	1967
Garvin v. Massachusetts	389 U.S. 13	1967
Price v. State Rd. Comm’n	389 U.S. 14	1967
Bitter v. United States	389 U.S. 15	1967
Roberts v. United States	389 U.S. 18	1967
Wood v. United States	389 U.S. 20	1967
Coleman v. Alabama	389 U.S. 22	1967
Jones v. Georgia	389 U.S. 24	1967
Skolnick v. Board of Comm'rs	389 U.S. 26	1967
Raymond v. Toffany	389 U.S. 26	1967
United States v. Mercantile Trust Co.	389 U.S. 27	1967
A.P. v. Walker	389 U.S. 28	1967
Lordi v. Epstein	389 U.S. 29	1967
Lester C. Newton Trucking Co. v. United States	389 U.S. 30	1967
Pinto v. Pierce	389 U.S. 31	1967
Beecher v. Alabama	389 U.S. 35	1967
Roberts v. LaVallee	389 U.S. 40	1967
Beatty v. United States	389 U.S. 45	1967
Sayles v. Wiegand	389 U.S. 45	1967
Mercer v. Hemmings	389 U.S. 46	1967
Bennett v. Mississippi	389 U.S. 46	1967
Potomac News Co. v. United States	389 U.S. 47	1967
Conner v. Hammond	389 U.S. 48	1967
United States v. Aluminum Co.	389 U.S. 49	1967
Central Mag. Sales, Ltd. v. United States	389 U.S. 50	1967
Garber v. Kansas	389 U.S. 51	1967
Carp v. Texas Bd. of Exam'rs	389 U.S. 52	1967
Kirk v. Wyoming	389 U.S. 53	1967
Whitehill v. Elkins	389 U.S. 54	1967
Longshoremen v. Philadelphia Marine Trade Ass'n	389 U.S. 64	1967
Umans v. United States	389 U.S. 80	1967
Beckley Newspapers Corp. v. Hanks	389 U.S. 81	1967
Garner v. Yeager	389 U.S. 86	1967
Baltimore & Ohio C. Terminal R.R. Co. v. United States	389 U.S. 88	1967
Chance v. California	389 U.S. 89	1967
Will v. United States	389 U.S. 90	1967
Burgett v. Texas	389 U.S. 109	1967
United States v. Rands	389 U.S. 121	1967
Mempa v. Rhay	389 U.S. 128	1967
Whitney v. Florida	389 U.S. 138	1967
Hackin v. Arizona	389 U.S. 143	1967
Modern Life Ins. Co. v. Wolfman	389 U.S. 153	1967
In re Epstein	389 U.S. 153	1967
Gregoire v. Louisiana	389 U.S. 154	1967
Nielsen v. Nebraska ex rel. Neb. State Bar Ass'n	389 U.S. 154	1967
United States v. Louisiana (1967)	389 U.S. 155	1967
F.T.C. v. Flotill Products, Inc.	389 U.S. 179	1967
Wyandotte Transp. Co. v. United States	389 U.S. 191	1967
Lucas v. Rhodes	389 U.S. 212	1967
Dolomite Products Co. v. Kipers	389 U.S. 214	1967
Bresolin v. Rhay	389 U.S. 214	1967
Wallace v. United States	389 U.S. 215	1967
Greyhound Lines, Inc. v. United States	389 U.S. 216	1967
Mine Workers v. Illinois Bar Ass'n	389 U.S. 217	1967
Nash v. Florida Indus. Comm’n	389 U.S. 235	1967
Zwickler v. Koota	389 U.S. 241	1967
United States v. Robel	389 U.S. 258	1967
Hughes v. Washington	389 U.S. 290	1967
United States v. Correll	389 U.S. 299	1967
United States v. Penn-Olin Chem. Co.	389 U.S. 308	1967
W.E.B. DuBois Clubs v. Clark	389 U.S. 309	1967
Burke v. Ford	389 U.S. 320	1967
Eagar v. Magma Copper Co.	389 U.S. 323	1967
Locomotive Firemen v. Bangor & Aroostook R.R. Co.	389 U.S. 327	1967
Germann v. United States	389 U.S. 329	1967
United Nat. Life Ins. Co. v. California	389 U.S. 330	1967
Demers v. Langton	389 U.S. 330	1967
Springfield v. Green	389 U.S. 331	1967
Devore v. West Virginia Bd. of Dental Exam'rs	389 U.S. 331	1967
Tcherepnin v. Knight	389 U.S. 332	1967
Katz v. United States	389 U.S. 347	1967
N.L.R.B. v. Fleetwood Trailer Co.	389 U.S. 375	1967
Case-Swayne Co. v. Sunkist Growers, Inc.	389 U.S. 384	1967
Sims v. Georgia	389 U.S. 404	1967
United States v. Dixie Highway Express, Inc.	389 U.S. 409	1967
Brooks v. Florida	389 U.S. 413	1967
Damico v. California	389 U.S. 416	1967
Rockefeller v. Wells	389 U.S. 421	1967
Simon v. Wharton	389 U.S. 425	1967
Satterfield v. Virginia	389 U.S. 425	1967
Lantz v. Lynden Transfer, Inc.	389 U.S. 426	1967
Burke-Parsons-Bowlby Corp. v. United States	389 U.S. 426	1967
Illinois v. Chicago B. & Q.R.R. Co.	389 U.S. 427	1967
Hulshart v. Maryland	389 U.S. 427	1967
Moses v. Washington	389 U.S. 428	1967
Zschernig v. Miller	389 U.S. 429	1968
Wirtz v. Glass Bottle Blowers	389 U.S. 463	1968
Wirtz v. Laborers	389 U.S. 477	1968
Penn-Cent. Merger & N. & W. Inclusion Cases	389 U.S. 486	1968
Massachusetts v. Painten	389 U.S. 560	1968
Chandler v. United States	389 U.S. 568	1968
Boyden v. California	389 U.S. 568	1967
Braswell Motor Freight Lines, Inc. v. United States	389 U.S. 569	1968
Seaside Properties, Inc. v. State Rd. Dept.	389 U.S. 569	1968
Randolph v. United States	389 U.S. 570	1968
Dinis v. Volpe	389 U.S. 570	1968
Louisiana Fin. Assistance Comm’n v. Poindexter	389 U.S. 571	1968
Buck v. New Jersey	389 U.S. 571	1968
James v. Gilmore	389 U.S. 572	1968
School Comm’n v. Board of Educ.	389 U.S. 572	1968
I.M. Amusement Corp. v. Ohio	389 U.S. 573	1968
Baxter v. City of Philadelphia	389 U.S. 573	1968
Strickland Transp. Co. v. United States	389 U.S. 574	1968
Kirk v. Gong	389 U.S. 574	1968
United States v. Bethlehem Steel Co.	389 U.S. 575	1968
National Small Shipments Traffic Conf., Inc. v. Ringsby Truck Lines, Inc.	389 U.S. 576	1968
Garment Workers v. Scherer & Sons, Inc.	389 U.S. 577	1968
Robert-Arthur Mgmt. Corp. v. Tennessee ex rel. Canale	389 U.S. 578	1968
Osbourne v. Mississippi Valley Barge Line Co.	389 U.S. 579	1968
Thrifty Shoppers Scrip Co. v. United States	389 U.S. 580	1968
Goldstein v. Cox	389 U.S. 581	1968
Miller v. Haines	389 U.S. 582	1968
Public Util. Comm’n v. Baltimore Shippers & Receivers Ass'n, Inc.	389 U.S. 583	1968
