= Zwickler v. Koota =

- Supreme Court of the United States

Decided December 5, 1967
- Full case name: Zwickler v. Koota
- Citations: 389 U.S. 241 (more)

Holding
- A federal court cannot use the abstention doctrine to avoid a constitutional issue merely because it determines that the plaintiff is unlikely to receive the relief they requested.

Court membership
- Chief Justice Earl Warren Associate Justices Hugo Black · William O. Douglas; John M. Harlan II · William J. Brennan Jr. Potter Stewart · Byron White; Abe Fortas · Thurgood Marshall

Case opinions
- Majority: Brennan
- Concurrence: Harlan

Zwickler v. Koota, 389 U.S. 241 (1967), was a United States Supreme Court case in which the Court held that a federal court cannot use the abstention doctrine to avoid a constitutional issue merely because it determines that the plaintiff is unlikely to receive the relief they requested. The underlying case was about an anonymous handbill law that the Court believed was overbroad.
