= United States v. Correll =

- Supreme Court of the United States

Argued November 14, 1967 Decided December 11, 1967
- Full case name: United States v. Correll
- Citations: 389 U.S. 299 (more) 88 S.Ct. 445; 19 L. Ed. 2d 537; 1967 U.S. LEXIS 2957

Holding
- In order for the taxpayer to be allowed to deduct the cost of his meals incurred while on a business trip, the trip must have required him to stop for sleep or rest.

Court membership
- Chief Justice Earl Warren Associate Justices Hugo Black · William O. Douglas; John M. Harlan II · William J. Brennan Jr. Potter Stewart · Byron White; Abe Fortas · Thurgood Marshall

Case opinions
- Majority: Stewart, joined by Warren, Harlan, Brennan, White
- Dissent: Douglas, joined by Black, Fortas
- Marshall took no part in the consideration or decision of the case.

Laws applied
- Internal Revenue Code, 26 U.S.C. § 162

United States v. Correll, 389 U.S. 299 (1967), is a case in which the United States Supreme Court ruled 5-3 that in order for the taxpayer to be allowed to deduct the cost of his meals incurred while on a business trip, the trip must have required him to stop for sleep or rest.

== Facts ==
The respondent, a traveling salesman from Tennessee, routinely took same-day business trips throughout 1960 and 1961. He would leave on business early in the morning and come back by dinner. Because he would eat breakfast and lunch on the road, he deducted the cost of those meals from his 1960 and 1961 income tax return pursuant to § 162(a)(2) of the Internal Revenue Code. § 162(a)(2) allows the taxpayer to deduct "traveling expenses [incurred] while away from home in the pursuit of a trade or business." The Commissioner of Internal Revenue ("Commissioner") disallowed the deductions on the ground that the respondent did not meet the definition of "away from home" under § 162(a)(2) because his trip did not require him to sleep or rest. Therefore, the Commissioner ruled that the cost of the meals was not a § 162(a)(2) business expense, but rather a "’personal, living’ expense under § 262." The respondent paid the tax and sued for a refund in the District Court. He received a favorable verdict in the District Court, which was affirmed by the Court of Appeals for the Sixth Circuit. The Supreme Court granted certiorari “in order to resolve a conflict among the circuits on this recurring question of federal income tax administration.”

== Analysis ==
If the cost of the meals did not qualify for a § 162(a)(2) business expense deduction, then they would be classified as a § 262 personal expense, and would be non-deductible. Whether the cost of the meals falls under § 162(a)(2) depends on how the phrase "traveling ... away from home" is interpreted. The Commissioner has interpreted the phrase as requiring the taxpayer to sleep or rest during his trip. The Court found two advantages to the Commissioner’s interpretation. First, the Court noted that a business traveler who is allowed a § 162(a)(2) business deduction receives a windfall, because part of what is spent on meals represents a personal living expense that other taxpayers are not entitled to deduct at all. Therefore, fairness demands that § 162(a)(2) should not extend to all situations involving business travel. Allowing a taxpayer who has to travel two blocks from his home on a business trip to take a § 162(a)(2) deduction, but not the taxpayer whose business requires no travel at all, illustrates the inequitable result of a contrary approach. Second, the requirement that the taxpayer must sleep away from home in order to qualify for a § 162(a)(2) deduction is a bright-line, easy to administer rule that avoids unnecessary litigation.

The Court uses statutory interpretation to affirm the Commissioner’s approach. First, the Court notes that “traveling” implies being “away from home.” Therefore, a broad interpretation of “away from home” would make the phrase redundant. In addition, the Court observes that the statute groups “meals and lodging” together, suggesting Congress’ intent to allow a deduction for the cost of meals only where the business traveler has to pay for lodging as well.

Finally, the Court notes that even if alternatives to this bright-line rule are available, it is not the Court’s role to fashion a new rule. “In this area of limitless factual variations, ‘it is the province of Congress and the Commissioner, not the courts, to make the appropriate adjustments.’”

Justices Douglas, Black and Fortas dissented on the ground that the phrase “while away from home” goes to geography and not time. The dissent argued that the majority’s approach of interpreting the phrase as “overnight” incorrectly switches the focus to a time element.

== Significance of the decision ==
The Court affirmed the Commissioner’s interpretation of the “away from home” requirement of § 162(a)(2). By doing so, the Court chose to retain a bright-line rule instead of a case-by-case approach — thereby avoiding uncertainty and excessive litigation.

Furthermore, the decision puts all one-day travelers forced to pay for their meals on an equal footing when it comes to allowing a § 162(a)(2) business expense deduction.

== See also ==
- Commissioner v. Kowalski - A 1977 Supreme Court decision on the taxability of employer provided meals.
- List of United States Supreme Court cases, volume 389
