= Mount Crawford, Virginia =

- Town
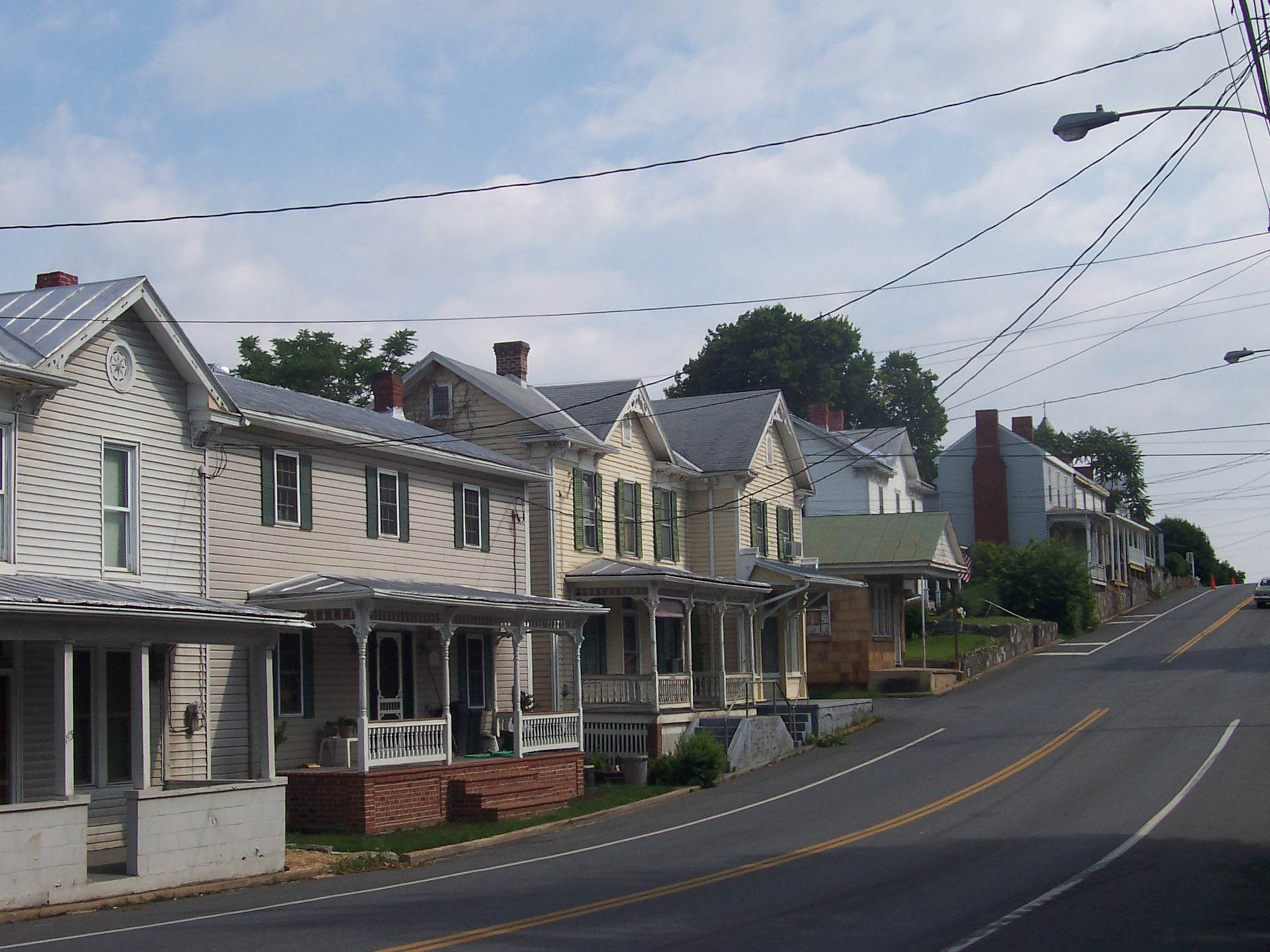
- Mount Crawford on Route 11

- Location of Mount Crawford within the Rockingham County

- Location in Virginia Mount Crawford, Virginia (the United States)
- Coordinates: 38°21′25″N 78°56′31″W
- Country: United States
- State: Virginia
- County: Rockingham

Area
  - Total: 0.50 sq mi (1.30 km^{2})
  - Land: 0.48 sq mi (1.25 km^{2})
  - Water: 0.019 sq mi (0.05 km^{2})
- Elevation: 1,204 ft (367 m)

Population (2010)
  - Total: 439
  - Estimate (2019): 458
  - Density: 949.1/sq mi (366.46/km^{2})
- Time zone: UTC−5 (Eastern (EST))
  - Summer (DST): UTC−4 (EDT)
- ZIP code: 22841
- Area code: 540
- FIPS code: 51-53864
- GNIS feature ID: 1495970
- Website: mountcrawford.us

Mount Crawford is a town in Rockingham County, Virginia, United States. It is included in the Harrisonburg metropolitan area, and as of the 2020 census, the town had a population of 439.

== History ==
The Town of Mount Crawford was established in 1825 and Incorporated and chartered in 1895. Historic Main Street, the area along US 11, has 42 single-family homes and five apartments. "Houses are on average over 100 years old, and the average year built is 1908. The oldest house was built in 1747. Twelve houses were built before the Civil War, and four of those built in the 1700s."

The property Contentment was listed on the National Register of Historic Places in 2006.

== Geography ==
Mount Crawford is located at 38°21′25″N 78°56′31″W (38.357039, −78.941807).

According to the United States Census Bureau, the town has a total area of 0.3 square miles (0.9 km^{2}), of which 0.3 square mile (0.9 km^{2}) is land and 0.04 square mile (0.1 km^{2}) (5.71%) is water.

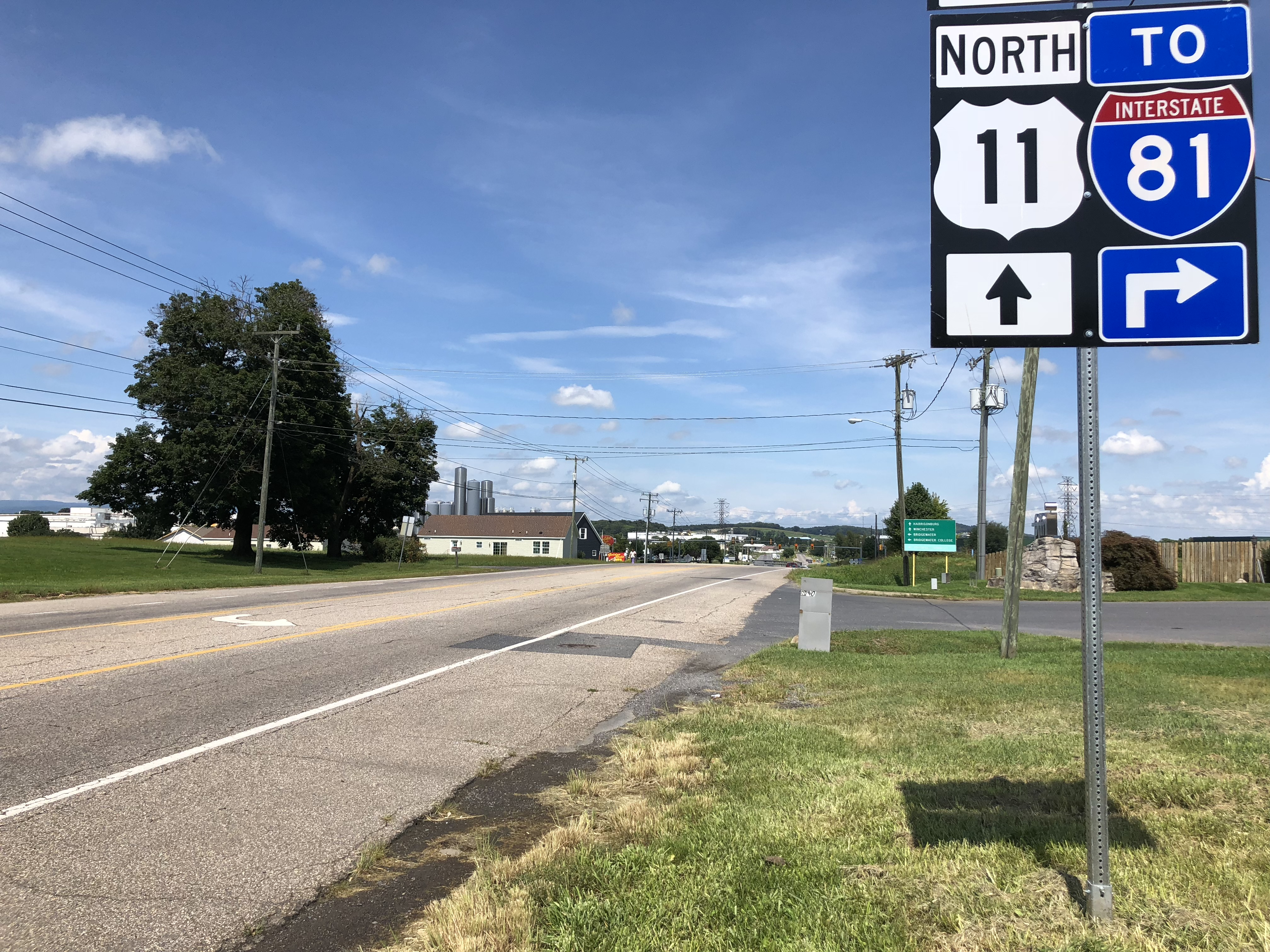
View north along US 11 approaching SR 257 in Mount Crawford

== Transportation ==
The main road running through Mount Crawford is U.S. Route 11. Just north of the town limits, US 11 connects with Virginia State Route 257, which connects with Interstate 81, the main long-distance highway through the region.

== Demographics ==
Historical population
| Census | Pop. | Note | %± |
|---|---|---|---|
| 1870 | 901 | | — |
| 1880 | 392 | | −56.5% |
| 1900 | 330 | | — |
| 1910 | 228 | | −30.9% |
| 1920 | 263 | | 15.4% |
| 1930 | 272 | | 3.4% |
| 1940 | 290 | | 6.6% |
| 1950 | 303 | | 4.5% |
| 1960 | 247 | | −18.5% |
| 1970 | 276 | | 11.7% |
| 1980 | 315 | | 14.1% |
| 1990 | 228 | | −27.6% |
| 2000 | 254 | | 11.4% |
| 2010 | 433 | | 70.5% |
| 2020 | 439 | | 1.4% |
U.S. Decennial Census

At the 2000 census there were 254 people, 104 households, and 74 families living in the town. The population density was 764.0 people per square mile (297.2/km^{2}). There were 109 housing units at an average density of 327.9 per square mile (127.5/km^{2}). The racial makeup of the town was 96.85% White, 1.57% African American, 0.39% Native American, and 1.18% from two or more races. Hispanic or Latino of any race were 0.39%.

Of the 104 households 28.8% had children under the age of 18 living with them, 53.8% were married couples living together, 9.6% had a female householder with no husband present, and 28.8% were non-families. 25.0% of households were one person and 5.8% were one person aged 65 or older. The average household size was 2.44 and the average family size was 2.81.

The age distribution was 22.8% under the age of 18, 6.7% from 18 to 24, 33.5% from 25 to 44, 23.2% from 45 to 64, and 13.8% 65 or older. The median age was 40 years. For every 100 females, there were 95.4 males. For every 100 females aged 18 and over, there were 92.2 males.

The median household income was $32,031 and the median family income was $47,917. Males had a median income of $30,536 versus $25,000 for females. The per capita income for the town was $14,856. About 5.3% of families and 5.8% of the population were below the poverty line, including 5.0% of those under the age of eighteen and 5.9% of those sixty-five or over.

== Business ==
The town of Mt. Crawford contains numerous small businesses including antique stores and furniture shops along Route 11, the main road through the town. Outside of the town limits but within the 22841 ZIP code are two shipping facilities: a regional Walmart warehouse and a smaller facility for the Rosetta Stone language instruction company. Rosetta Stone has its headquarters in nearby Harrisonburg, Virginia.
