= Contentment (Mount Crawford, Virginia) =

Historic house in Virginia, United States

- U.S. National Register of Historic Places
- Virginia Landmarks Register
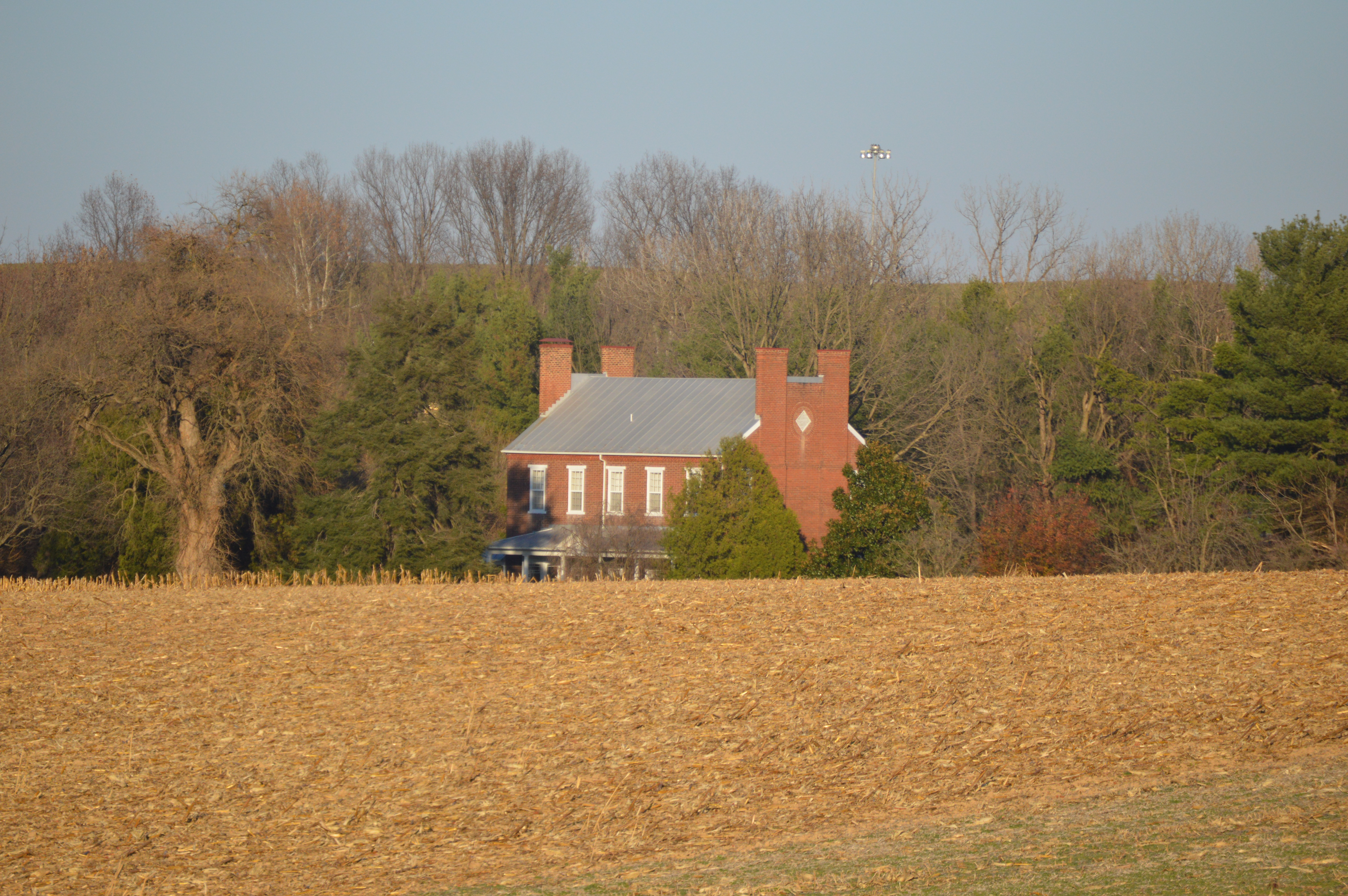
- View from U.S. Route 11

- Location within Virginia Location within the United States
- Location: 253 Contentment Ln., near Mount Crawford, Virginia
- Coordinates: 38°20′31″N 78°56′13″W
- Area: 3.3 acres (1.3 ha)
- Built: 1823
- Architectural style: Federal
- NRHP reference No.: 04000481
- VLR No.: 082-0062

Significant dates
- Added to NRHP: May 19, 2004
- Designated VLR: March 17, 2004

Contentment, also known as the Grattan House, is a historic home located near Mount Crawford, Rockingham County, Virginia. It was built in 1823, and is a two-story, five-bay, brick Federal style dwelling. It has a pair of slightly projecting interior end chimneys placed at each end of the standing-seam metal gable roof with a brick parapet between each pair. During the American Civil War, on June 2–3, 1864, the house served as the headquarters of Confederate General John D. Imboden before the Battle of Piedmont. It was also the site of one of the major skirmishes before the Confederate defeat at Cedar Creek, near Winchester. That skirmish was initiated by General Jubal Early and began at Contentment on October 4, 1864.

It was listed on the National Register of Historic Places in 2006.
