= United States v. Robel =

- Supreme Court of the United States

Argued November 14, 1966 Decided December 11, 1967
- Full case name: United States v. Robel
- Citations: 389 U.S. 258 (more) 88 S. Ct. 419; 19 L. Ed. 2d 508; 1967 U.S. LEXIS 2741

Holding
- The United States government cannot deprive the people of constitutional rights, even in the interests of national security

Court membership
- Chief Justice Earl Warren Associate Justices Hugo Black · William O. Douglas; John M. Harlan II · William J. Brennan Jr. Potter Stewart · Byron White; Abe Fortas · Thurgood Marshall

Case opinions
- Majority: Warren, joined by Black, Douglas, Stewart, Fortas
- Concurrence: Brennan
- Dissent: White, joined by Harlan
- Marshall took no part in the consideration or decision of the case.

Laws applied
- First Amendment, McCarran Internal Security Act

United States v. Robel, 389 U.S. 258 (1967), was a case heard by the Supreme Court of the United States. The court ruled that the United States government cannot deprive the people of constitutional rights - in this case, freedom of association - even in the interests of national security.

== Background ==
The petitioner, Eugene Frank Robel, who worked at Todd Shipyards in Seattle, was indicted on May 21, 1963, for being a member of the Communist Party of the United States (CPUSA) and thus affiliated with it, without being registered with the Subversive Activities Control Board in violation of the McCarran Internal Security Act section 5 (a) (I) (D). Since the act required CPUSA to register as a Communist Party, he was told because of his affiliation with the Party, he also had to register as well, and that he could no longer work at the shipyard because of his affiliation with the Communist Party; Todd Shipyards had been designated a "defense" facility, otherwise known as federal employment, which was illegal under the McCarran Act. Robel appealed his conviction to the Supreme Court.

The Court found the McCarran Internal Security Act violates the defendant's right to free association that is guaranteed by the First Amendment.

== Supreme Court ==
Chief Justice Earl Warren observed that it "would indeed be ironic, if in the name of national defense, we would sanction the subversion of one of those liberties — the freedom of association — which makes the defense of the Nation worthwhile."

== Brennan's concurrence ==
Justice William Brennan wrote separately about the constitutional structure to emphasizing that "the congressional delegation of authority to the Secretary of Defense to designate 'defense facilities' creates the danger of overbroad, unauthorized, and arbitrary application of criminal sanctions in an area of protected freedoms and therefore ... renders this statute invalid."

== See also ==
- List of United States Supreme Court cases, volume 389
