= Domestic containment =

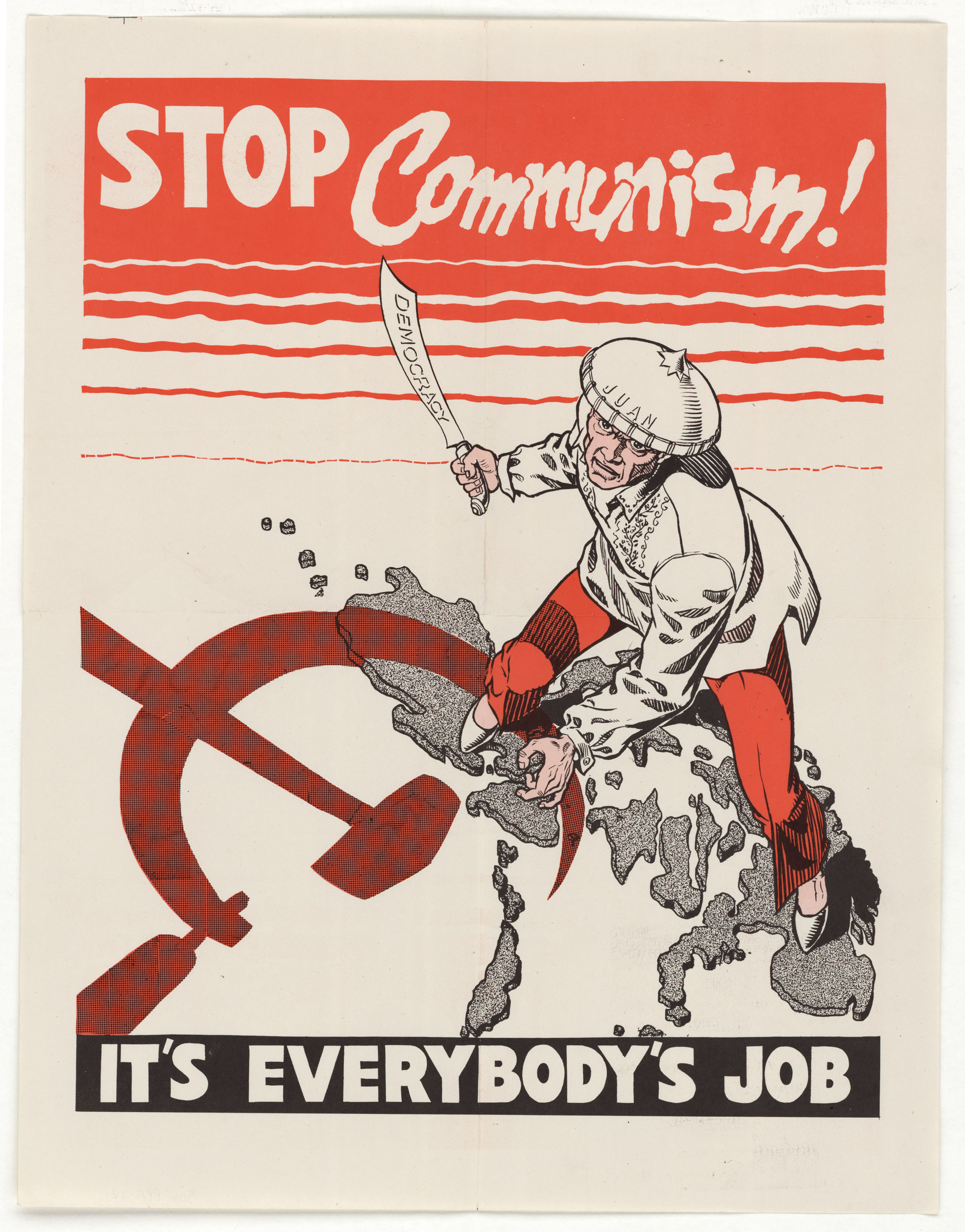
United States Information Service poster distributed in Asia depicting Juan dela Cruz ready to defend the Philippines under the threat of communism, 1951.

In the cultural history of the United States during the Cold War, domestic containment was the notion that women's main role is in the home, while men work to provide for the family in order to keep a stable home environment and uphold "good American values.” Domestic containment emphasised family values and stability in periods of national terror and uncertainty. It relied on the idea that the American nuclear family unit facilitated a "secure private nest removed from the dangers of the outside world."

== Origins and the Cold War ==
Domestic containment originated during the Cold War period in the 1950s in response to Communism. This idea of containment culture, as coined by George F. Kennan was born from North America's fear of "the other" and overwhelming xenophobia towards Communist countries. A culture of fear and manipulation was employed by North American governments to convince citizens that communism was something to be feared and was an attack on American values such as capitalism and family. The 1962 anti-communist film "Red Nightmare." used the nuclear family unit as an American freedom and liberty susceptible to corruption and aimed to warn Americans not to take their American freedoms for granted by threatening the family. Domestic containment came to represent the strength of America's character.

Examples of the North American government employing domestic containment theory can be observed on the Marshallese island Kwajalein, as the American government erected a pseudo quasi typical American suburbia for specialist American knowledge workers to relocate their families and make them feel at home. There were many surveillance policies in the Marshall Islands directed at ensuring domestic containment remained an omnipresent reminder of American values even on foreign islands, creating a false sense of home in the Central Pacific for American knowledge workers. Racial segregation between the white American knowledge workers and domestic labor buttressed domestic containment ideologies, as "the spatial isolation and racial homogeneity of suburbia offered a form of domestic containment".

== Backlash and women's rights ==
=== Empowerment in the workforce ===
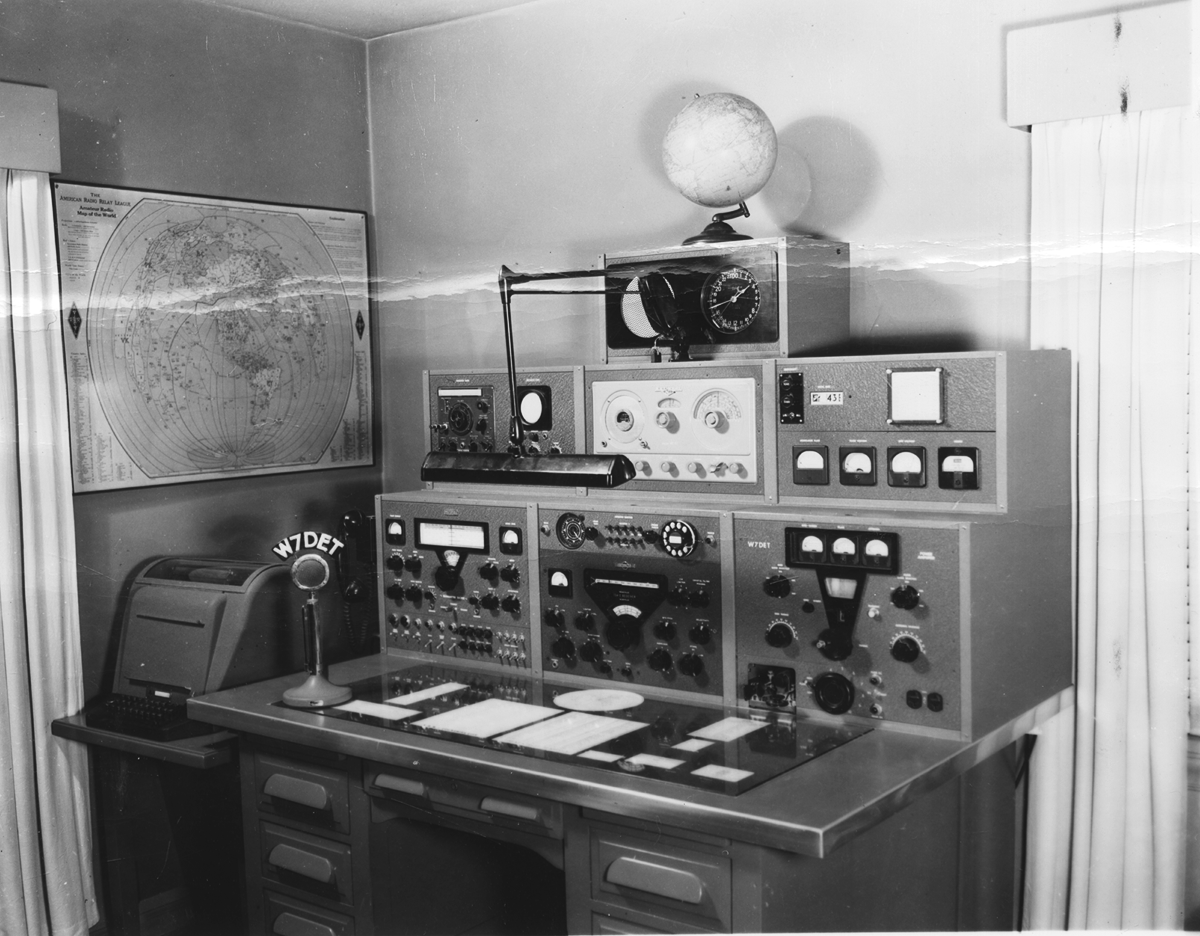
Amateur radio equipment, Seattle, 1957.

There were many counter domestic containment movements as women promoted the "cosmopolitan, technocratic vision of radio's capacity to foster a progressive society unencumbered by outmoded gender expectations." Though the radio industry was mainly male dominated, in the early 1950s a surge of mainly white women took up the ham radio as a hobby, or picked up the practice from their husbands. Some were already trained in radio communication and intelligence gathering as part of the influx of women in the workforce in the absence of men during World War Two.

The ham radio community allowed women to become federally licensed radio operators able to express their passion for amateur radio activities. Within the public sphere women were generally absent, men portrayed as the national defenders and wage earners. These 'ham' women refused to be sequestered within the home and became quintessential of female empowerment, demonstrating the ham contributions to US national security. Ham women worked to rebel against the atmosphere of fear and tension of the Cold War by using the radio as a means of bridging the gap between ideological divides and pioneering democratic discourse and rekindling international ham communication. QSL cards became the tactile embodiment of women's presence in the ham radio community. These cards were evidence of the failure of domestic containment as they depict practical, driven women who utilised their homes into radio stations as a way to interact with the outside world.

Despite the empirical evidence, there still persisted the general fear ham woman would communicate with foreign hams, become too domineering, force their husbands to do housework and turn their children queer.

=== Female sexuality ===
During the cold war North American families turned to conventional gender roles. Domestic containment aimed to appeal to the returning male veterans and forced women to adopt feminine roles in order to appease their husbands who had returned from World War Two. As a result, women were reduced to lives of servitude and tools to benefit the man rather than distinct and individual human beings.

Female sexuality was repressed by the ideal domestic containment family model; the hetero-normative, generally white, nuclear family unit. Lesbianism was seen as a threat, and the increased stigmatisation of lesbians outside the family reinforced domestic containment. The idea of the 'menacing lesbian wife' and generally conservative gendered models of marriage were propagated though mainstream culture. These ideas were undermined however by the presence of women in the workforce and burgeoning visibility of queer men and women in media. Additionally, employment rates in 1964 show 43% of the workforce was married women with children in school. During the Cold War, politicians attempted to systematise New Deal social welfare into state policies to buttress the nuclear family unit model, ensuring the male as a necessary part of the family as the "breadwinner". The trope of the menacing lesbian wife was designed to counter good American values and thus promote domestic containment ideals. Said archetype was often portrayed as a one who dominated her husband, refused to housework thus allowing the home to turn to disarray, shirked her parental responsibilities and was sexually frigid. Other tropes such as the dangerous prison wife were circulated in the media by politicians as part of their domestic containment campaign in order to besmirch liberal reformers with undefined stances on perversion and communism.

== Eventual failure ==
A combination of factors lead to the eventual failure of containment culture in North America. With the Cold War coming to an end, the peak of heightened fear over, the growing acknowledgement of women's rights, and the United States' failure to control communism within Vietnam, containment policies were abandoned in North American government processes.

== Resurgence and the war on terror ==
The resurgence of domestic containment theory came after the September 11 attacks to the World Trade Centre, a period of fear and xenophobia similar to that of the Cold War period. The war on terror during the Bush administration had an impact on the role of women, as it created an iteration of domestic containment with ideas on traditional conservative gender roles mirroring the sentiments of the Cold War period.

Vice President Dick Cheney stated the terrorists were "at war with practically every liberal ideal," as their ideologies "would condemn women to servitude." This notion of the Bush administration illustrated the contrast between the Western world and their enemies by comparing the place of women in their respective societies and the religious institutions within these two opposing societies. Similarities can be observed between the domestic containment ideologies of the Cold War and the Bush administration. Through elevating the autonomy of working mothers, daughters, sisters and so on as well as religious pluralism the Bush administration was able to promote a social structure different to Islam. Laura Bush's 2001 radio address explained the universality of unconditional love for one's family with an emphasis on respect for female family members. This address mirrors values in Eleanor Roosevelt's statements in the beginning of the Cold War wherein she states "the family is the centre for men and women alike, and for the children, and we try to make it possible for the father of the family to earn enough so that the woman can stay home and care for the children if she wishes." This created the idealistic perception that women could balance both public citizen responsibilities and motherhood, contradictory to the paternal patriarchy of Islam. Under the guise of equality and empowerment the Bush administration used domestic containment ideas to demonize Islam and create the perception that Muslims in America posed a threat to the family and women. The Bush administration appealed to America's strong sense of family and individualism in order to reinstate domestic containment conservative ideals within the public sphere and general discourse.
