= Martin Kerr =

American neo-Nazi activist (born 1952)

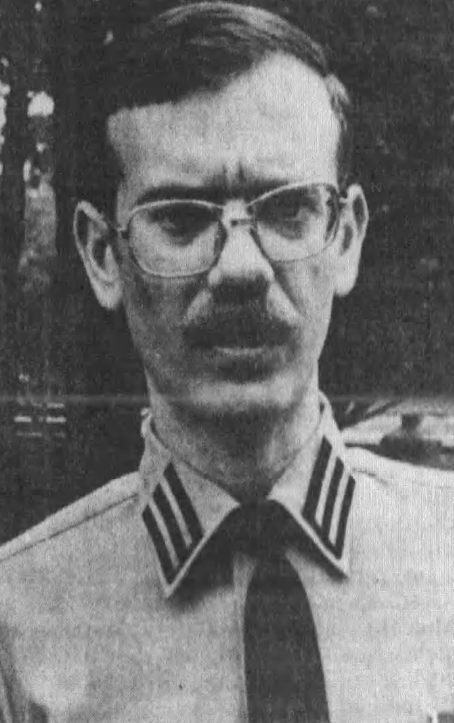
- Kerr in 1978

3rd Leader of the New Order
- Incumbent
- Assumed office 10 October 2014
- Preceded by: Matt Koehl

Personal details
- Born: 1952 (age 73–74) Pennsylvania, U.S.
- Education: Hofstra University

Martin Kerr (born 1952), formerly known as David Kerr, (Note: Material from his time at Hofstra University refers to him as David Kerr.) is an American neo-Nazi activist who is the third and current leader of the New Order, formerly the American Nazi Party. Kerr became a neo-Nazi as a teenager and joined the National Socialist White People's Party. In 1972, during his time at Hofstra University, he placed a Nazi flag in his dorm window, which resulted in media coverage and protests from Jewish organizations. He was ultimately ordered to take the flag down.

After his neo-Nazi propaganda distribution in the 1980s resulted in publicity, Kerr became the national spokesman for the NSWPP, but left only a year later after it had become the New Order. He rejoined in 2007. He assumed leadership of the New Order in 2014, following the death of its longtime leader Matt Koehl. He has written or edited several neo-Nazi publications.

== Early life ==
Kerr was born in 1952 in Pennsylvania. His family moved to New Jersey when he was aged three or four, where he was raised. His mother was a high school physical education teacher and his father was a public relations man. His family was Protestant, but he stated at age 20 that he no longer believed in organized religion. He had a sister two years his junior. He became a neo-Nazi in high school, after he read an interview with George Lincoln Rockwell, the founder of the American Nazi Party. Kerr joined the National Socialist Youth Movement of the ANP at the age of 14, in 1966, but left after less than a year. His parents and his sister disliked his political views. According to Kerr, they "coerced" him into leaving the party, after which he joined again.

=== Hofstra University incident ===
Kerr studied English at Hofstra University; he frequently conflicted with the school staff over his political views. In February 1972, in his sophomore year of his studies at Hofstra, he received news coverage for displaying a Nazi flag in his dorm window. After joining the NSWPP and NRP he placed ads for both groups in the campus paper, at the order of the party. He also had a framed photo of Hitler in his dorm. The university initially said they would not take action.

As a result of the incident, a bomb threat was sent to the campus paper and Kerr's roommate (who did not share his views) became distressed. Major Jewish groups protested the campus's decision. Ultimately the university altered course for fear that violence would result, and asked him to take it down. He did, but threatened to put it back up, and president of Hofstra Clifford Lee Lord met with Kerr and ordered him to stop displaying the flag out of his window. He obliged, but asked if he could place a sign saying "Free Speech For Nazis" during a campus speech by Meir Kahane as a result of the incident, which was accepted. Kahane stated at the speech that "there is a quick and efficient method of dealing with David Kerrs".

== Politics ==
In 1969, Kerr joined the National Renaissance Party, editing their newsletter, but left in 1971. He afterwards joined the National Socialist White People's Party (formerly the American Nazi Party) in 1971. He was in its Los Angeles branch, under Joseph Tommasi. After Tommasi formed the National Socialist Liberation Front, Kerr stayed in the NSWPP; Tommasi's old unit kept their location, and claimed that in retaliation NSLF members had "beat the daylights" out of NSWPP members, including Kerr. Kerr denied this telling of events, saying that the NSLF members had quickly been chased away. In 1972, he became the second-in-command, as well as a general spokesman during Koehl's absence. He became an organizer for the party in Washington by 1976, and in 1977, he became the editor for their periodical White Power, and their quarterly National Socialist. In 1980, he began editing a neo-Nazi journal, The National Socialist, which was similar to the prior, defunct National Socialist World in its attempt to foster a more revolutionary approach to Nazism; articles, largely by members of the World Union of National Socialists, included ones on Hans F. K. Günther and Friedrich Nietzsche.

In 1982, as a result of his neo-Nazi literature distribution, the Maryland state legislature considered a bill that would make purveying "defamatory material" a crime punishable by a year of jail and an $1000 fine; this ultimately failed, but the resulting attention got Kerr promoted to national spokesman of the party. He announced the party's move to Wisconsin in December 1982, along with a name change to the New Order; he said the group would have more support there and the name would be a "better reflection" of the group. Kerr then denied the group was anti-black or antisemitic, and claimed the group aimed to curb pollution, nuclear armament, and raise funding for diseases that largely affected those of Northern European ancestry. At this time, the party was small and extremely fringe; a writer on fringe movements disputed his claim that the group was not racist. Kerr left the New Order at the end of 1983. In 1999, he wrote for the Resistance Records' magazine, Resistance, using the pseudonym David Walker.

In 2007, Kerr rejoined the organization. Kerr assumed leadership of the New Order in 2014 after the death of Matt Koehl, the previous commander. He wrote a work titled "History of American National Socialism", an 8-part study of the American far-right's history. After the Unite the Right rally in Charlottesville, he was interviewed by The Washington Post, where he called Rockwell "the grandfather of the white racialist movement as it exists today", and said Rockwell would have been "very pleased" by the rally. In 2017, he and the New Order commemorated George Lincoln Rockwell in Arlington, Virginia in a gathering, which Kerr said was to test the community's "commitment to diversity". Under Kerr, the group is based in New Berlin, Wisconsin.

== Views ==
Kerr was an associate and admirer of neo-Nazi James Mason for many years, a former member of the NSWPP, even after Mason left the group and publicly criticized Koehl. He wrote to Mason while he was imprisoned. Following the release of Mason's Siege, Kerr received copies. He said to Mason that he thought that it was "truly a magnificent production: it exceeded my expectations and it is unsurpassed by anything else in book form I have seen in my 27 years in the Movement", and said that though Mason did not "come up with the right answers each time", he "invariably ask[s] the right questions and raise the right issues." Kerr later described the original American Nazi Party as "a mélange of basic NS radicalism, common sense, and traditional American rightwing politics", viewing it as not legitimately National Socialist; in this he agreed with Mason. However, he later stated he had changed his mind about Mason's work, calling it "irrelevant" and "far outside the mainstream of contemporary NS thought".

Kerr was an associate of British neo-Nazis and an important member of the American Friends of the British National Party, chairing most of their meetings. He donated $500 to Simon Darby to support an election campaign by the party. British far-right activist John Bean wrote a book largely consisting of an interview with himself and Kerr, Many Shades of Black. Reviewing Mr Evil, a book about neo-Nazi murderer David Copeland, Kerr accused the authors of political bias and said "the unpleasant reality is that there will be more David Copleands [sic] in the future", but that the movement could not be held responsible for "undisciplined members on its fringes". He also reviewed one of Colin Jordan's books for a white power website; he endorsed violence at some point, but disagreed with Jordan's ideas on the time when it would be appropriate to carry it out, saying "we think that now is not the time for armed insurrection". He was a personal friend of Danish neo-Nazi Povl Riis-Knudsen.

Kerr claimed as Chief of Staff that the New Order is no longer a white supremacist group and focuses on advocating "in favor of [white] people, not against other races or ethnicities ...we consider the white people of the world to be a gigantic family of racial brothers and sisters, united by ties of common ancestry and common heritage. Being for our own family does not mean that we hate other families." He went on to criticise the Southern Poverty Law Center, who still classify them as a hate group, calling the SPLC an "anti-White hate organization".
