= Siege (Mason book) =

Book by neo-Nazi James Mason

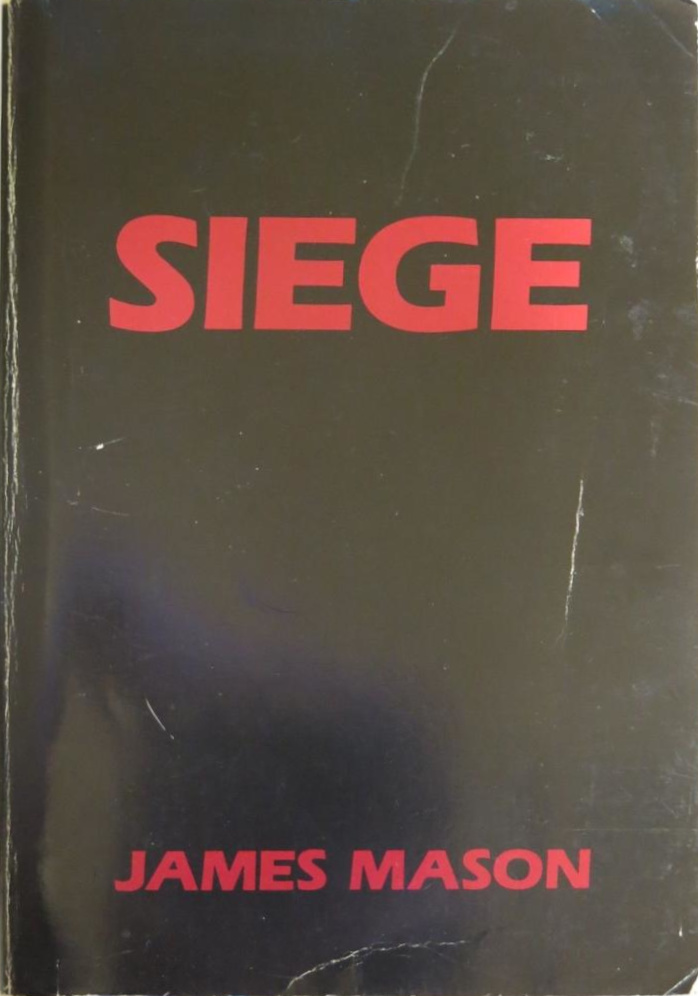
- 1st edition (Storm Books) cover
- Editor: Michael J. Moynihan
- Author: James Mason
- Language: English (translated into several languages)
- Subject: Terrorism, neo-Nazism
- Published: 1992 (1st, Storm Books); 2003 (2nd, Black Sun Publications); 2015 (3rd, Iron March); 2018 (4th edition); 2021 (5th edition)
- Publication place: United States
- Media type: Print (hardcover and paperback)
- Pages: 434 (first edition)
- ISBN: 0-9724408-0-1 2nd edition
- OCLC: 43098249

Siege (sometimes stylised as SIEGE), originally published as Siege: The Collected Writings of James Mason, is an anthology of essays by the neo-Nazi James Mason. After growing disillusioned with the mass movement approach of neo-Nazi movements, Mason began advocating for white revolution through terrorism. Mason originally wrote the essays from 1980 to 1986 for the National Socialist Liberation Front newsletter of the same name, which was itself the revival of a 1970s periodical created by Joseph Tommasi. The essays were published and edited in a single volume by Michael J. Moynihan in 1992. It has since been republished and reedited multiple times.

Though the book was reviewed in several periodicals upon its release and was praised and distributed by the influential white supremacist Tom Metzger, most neo-Nazis of the time either ignored or criticized the book. It was not influential for many years, though was occasionally discussed in academic literature. In the 2010s the book found a new audience online among younger neo-Nazis due to the book's republication by the neo-fascist forum Iron March. In addition to its promotion of neo-Nazism, it lionizes serial killers, mass murderers, and Charles Manson. Siege advocates neo-Nazi lone wolf terrorism, and has been tied to numerous terrorist groups.

== Background ==
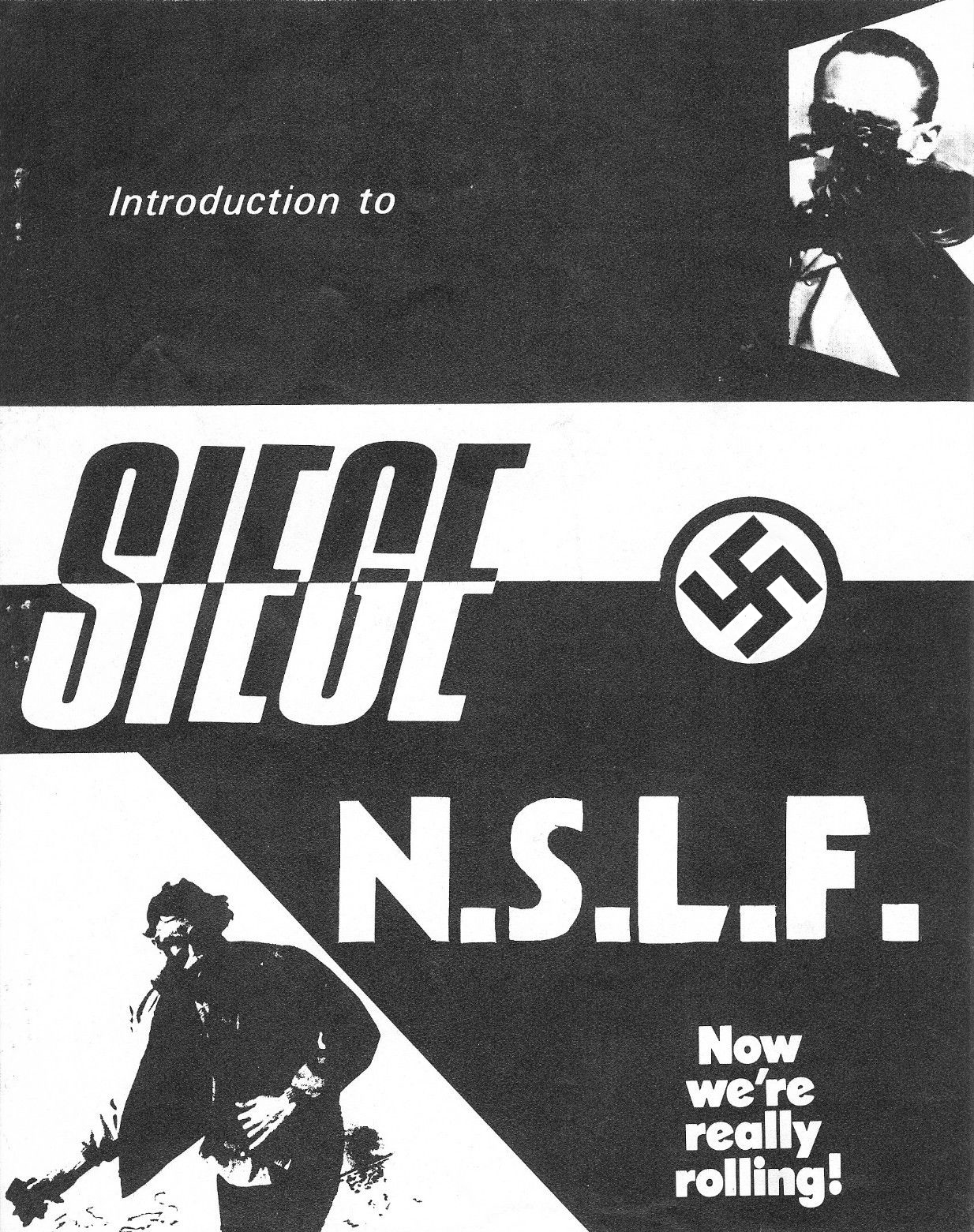
Cover of the first issue of Tommasi's original Siege newsletter

James Mason (born 1952) had been a neo-Nazi since he was 14, initially joining George Lincoln Rockwell's American Nazi Party (by then renamed the National Socialist White People's Party, or NSWPP), before he joined a militant splinter of that group, the National Socialist Liberation Front (NSLF). Siege emerged out of the faction of the NSWPP that wished for explicit revolutionary violence. Another former member of this wing of the ANP was William Luther Pierce, who wrote The Turner Diaries.

The NSLF was launched by Joseph Tommasi in 1974, after he was kicked out of the NSWPP. While James Mason did not initially follow Tommasi in leaving the NSWPP, he grew increasingly dissatisfied with it, and observed Tommasi's group with interest. He later left the NSWPP some time after. The NSLF took credit for several bombings, arsons, and shootings.

Tommasi was murdered by a member of the NSWPP in 1975, and was treated as a martyr by the NSLF. One of the NSLF's periodicals was named Siege, created by Tommasi. Mason claimed Tommasi took the name from a book about the Weather Underground. However, there is no book by this name about the Weather Underground. Spencer Sunshine proposed in 2024 that Tommasi had actually taken the title from the book Miami and the Siege of Chicago by Norman Mailer, which discussed a conflict between the Weather Underground's predecessor group and the police. In 2026, Sunshine said that Martin Kerr, who knew Tommasi, clarified that the title had actually come from the 1969 Edwin Corley novel Siege. The plot of the book focuses around a group of radical black nationalists who plot the establishment of a black ethnostate.

== The newsletter ==
When he joined the NSLF, Mason became the editor of a revival of the original Siege. The Siege newsletter ran each month from August 1980 until June 1986. Each issue was six pages and was almost always written by Mason. Mason's writings frequently built off the ideologies of George Lincoln Rockwell, Joseph Tommasi, Adolf Hitler, and William Luther Pierce. The newsletter also sometimes came in the form of reprints and writing by Joseph Tommasi, Perry Warthan, and Frank Spisak.

During this time, Mason's neo-Nazi ideology remained ardent, but also fluctuated. For example, he ultimately proclaimed Christianity as an important facet of neo-Nazism in the last years of the publication. Another fluctuation during this newsletter was his support for violent activism. In the beginning, Mason wrote fondly of violent tactics from leftists and black nationalists. Later, however, his support for this sort of activism — even more broadly — waned. Through and through, the SIEGE Newsletter remained anti-system, even rejecting notions of being conservative or right-wing. It advocated "a TOTAL WAR" and advocated acts that would end in a "total and complete revolution" against the establishment, what it called "the Jew-Capitalist System!!" While writing Siege, he became increasingly disillusioned by neo-Nazi group organization, and in favor of self-directed action; he initially promoted open guerrilla warfare but came to see this as insufficient.

In terms of violent activism, Mason was drawn to state and civilian clashes such as the 1981 Brink's robbery and the 1985 MOVE bombing. However, he advised that the neo-Nazis should let black nationalists and leftists fight this fight with the state and that the neo-Nazi movement should deactivate any violent activism. The newsletter ended when Mason received harsh criticism over his views from other neo-Nazis for his support of Charles Manson. During its run, the newsletter had a circulation of less than 100 copies.

== The book ==
=== Publication history ===
With the ending of the Siege newsletter, other figures in the American neo-Nazi movement such as Michael J. Moynihan encouraged Mason to create an anthology of sorts that included his earlier works. The Abraxas Foundation, of which Moynihan was a part, had a large amount of involvement in the popularization of Mason's works and the book's publication. After years of struggling to find someone who would publish the book, it came out in 1992, entitled SIEGE: The Collected Writings of James Mason. Mason dedicated the book to Charles Manson. The first edition was published by Moynihan under the Storm Books imprint. Moynihan also edited the book.

Siege's first edition was 434 pages long. The cover of this first edition, based on Mason's original suggestion, is simple, with a red title and black background, with the spine and the back displaying a thunderbolt and shield symbol, the logo of the publisher. The initial cover design was more complicated, featuring Rockwell, Tommasi, Manson, and Hitler. The book's front matter notes that "The Publisher/Author assume no liability for any use or misuse of the material presented herein", and says the book does not claim to represent the views of Charles Manson or his associates. The contents in the book are arranged by theme, not chronologically, with Mason's materials from different periods put together, in addition to illustrations. Some text was changed from the newsletter, though largely only to correct grammatical or typography mistakes.

A second edition was released in 2003 by Ryan Schuster's Black Sun Publications. Schuster wrote the preface to the second edition, declaring its intention "to be used as a cookbook and a guide". This edition was digitized by the white supremacist website Solar General, which spread the book online. When the neo-Nazi forum Iron March rediscovered the book, they republished it in a third edition in 2015. John Cameron Denton, the leader of the Atomwaffen Division, published a fourth edition in 2018. The fourth edition was 684 pages long. A fifth was published in 2021, with a new preface by Mason. A sixth edition came in 2023, issued by an Atomwaffen splinter group and cell of the Order of Nine Angles; this, the "666 edition", was the single edition to be denounced by Mason. This edition has a new introduction that denounces Mason as having grown too weak for his earlier ideology. Mason, in turn, accused the publishers of being an FBI front.

Siege has been translated into several languages. The various editions entailed changes in content, and later editions were substantially longer. Images, prefaces, and appendices were added to later editions. These additions included speeches from influential neo-Nazi figures, other magazine articles, and propaganda posters.

=== Contents ===
The first edition has a thanks section from the publisher, which was removed from the second edition and was not included in any later editions. This section thanks "James Mason for his complete cooperation, Jo for the hospitality in Ohio, Ed Reynolds, T. Thorn, Anton La Vey, Adam Parfrey, The Black Flame, US West Communications and R. Ward for typesetting assistance". Moynihan himself ended up writing the introduction, under the pseudonym Michael M. Jenkins, to the SIEGE book. It begins: "James Mason is a radical extremist. He has actively dedicated the better part of his life to principles which the average member of society would find terrifying, violent and vicious, if not outright insane." Moynihan recounted Mason's background and origins. Further, Moynihan wrote of the book that:

The SIEGE volume you hold in your hands is intended both as a guide and a tool. For the observer, or the curious, it serves as a guide through the netherworld of extremist political thought.... this book offers a unique and direct access-point to understanding the philosophy, tactics, and propaganda of an increasingly militant and uncompromising brand of National Socialism. [...] Secondly, and more importantly, this book is meant to serve as a practical tool. A majority of readers will hopefully not be mere sociologists or researchers, but rather that small faction of people who may be already predisposed towards these ideas. this certainly does not only refer to National Socialists, but revolutionaries and fanatics of all stripes.

In addition to the materials from Mason, works from Rockwell, Tommasi, and Perry Warthan are included in the book. The first edition contains 8 sections and five appendixes of various other topics and documents. The appendix section totals about 60 pages. The book contains several images. Tommasi is repeatedly discussed in Siege; the first edition included about 20 photos of him or the NSLF, the most of anyone in the book. The book could be ordered from Storm Books for $22.

=== Initial reception ===
Upon its release, it received a review in the right-wing music magazine The Fifth Path, a review in the zine Ohm Clock, a shorter review in Welcomat, an alternative weekly based in Philadelphia, and in the Church of Satan's magazine The Black Flame. It also received reviews or promotions in the explicitly racist periodicals Plexus, Heretic, Revolutionary Nationalist, Greystorm, and Resistance. The book was heavily promoted by two individuals: the influential white supremacist Tom Metzger, and Peter H. Gilmore of the Church of Satan. Metzger praised the book and was largely responsible for the spread of the book in its first edition, promoting it in his periodicals and selling it directly. Mason later credited Metzger for a large amount of the book's distribution. Gilmore spoke of his praise for Siege and recommended it to Satanists. He called it a "monumental achievement" and said that Mason's writing was "filled with clarity", "the unvarnished thinking of an American radical".

The first publication of the book was mostly successful. Despite this, it did not receive much attention and received criticism from other neo-Nazis, or was ignored. Both Moynihan and Mason came to see it as having been "blacklisted" by most neo-Nazis, though they understated the amount of attention it did receive. Mason attributed this to jealousy of the book's quality and an unwillingness to accept his "truth". Spencer Sunshine said it was likely Mason's praise of murderers, obsession with Manson, and "personal alienation" from most neo-Nazi leaders of the time that contributed to the initial obscurity of the book. Siege was not greatly influential until many years later.

Siege received little scholarly attention prior to the 2010s, with the exception of two scholars of the far-right: Jeffrey Kaplan and Nicholas Goodrick-Clarke, who had studied it earlier, prior to the release of its second edition. Kaplan had discussed it briefly in a 1995 article entitled "Right Wing Violence in America" and in a 1997 article entitled "'Leaderless Resistance'", while Goodrick-Clarke covered it in his 2002 book Black Sun, where he gave the first substantial scholarly analysis of the work. Due to its rise in influence it gained substantially more scholarly attention in the 2010s.

== Ideology ==
Siege idolizes Adolf Hitler, and adheres to what it describes as terroristic National Socialism; Mason describes Hitler as "the greatest personality in all of history" and "the LAST CHANCE for the revival of Western Civilization". The tone is deeply pessimistic about the state of society. It includes the idea of The System, which is a conspiracy of the government, Jews and capitalists acting against white interests. Mason describes the American government as the enemy, saying it is "by every standard of measure, the most evil thing that has ever existed on earth", and argues any act against it is justified. It denies the Holocaust, employs several antisemitic conspiracies, and defends the Manson murders. In addition to Manson and Hitler, it lionizes Tommasi and the occultist Savitri Devi. Siege does not use the term accelerationism but Mason employs similar ideas.

Scholars Bethan Johnson and Matthew Feldman described it as "unrepentantly and unflinchingly racist, antisemitic, white supremacist, and anti-democratic", but that it was rather distinguished from other neo-Nazi works by "the terroristic extremity of Siege's call for violence". It celebrates violence, chronicles real-world attacks by far-right extremists, even of people otherwise innocent; it is argued that there can be no innocents or those considered noncombatants in a "race war". Anyone who disagrees with this is considered an enemy, whether it is a "comrade, friend, family member [...] it doesn't matter." It celebrates various serial killers and mass murderers, some of whom he had known personally, and even terrorist attacks committed by leftists.

Siege explicitly advocated lone wolf terrorism, as opposed to group terrorism. It was noted as the first text to do so; later, William Luther Pierce would espouse similar ideas in the novel Hunter, and Louis Beam published his better-known essay "Leaderless Resistance", which may have been influenced by Mason. It advises against group planning due to the risk of detection. This is the work's main message, advising of lone wolf terror to "an all-consuming extent". To this end, it extensively glorifies past lone wolf terrorists, creating a "canon" of them. It particularly presents this as a benefit to those who have experienced social rejection, presenting their rejection by society as a virtue, as Mason claims "to be outside this society is a marked badge of honor", and attempts to convince such a reader that by becoming terrorists they will be immortalized and respected. Johnson and Feldman noted Siege's rhetoric as "a near perfect execution" of the radicalization and indoctrination technique of "reorientation of personal trauma".

== Influence ==
Siege is an obligatory read for those within the contemporary neo-Nazi movement today, and Mason is considered by some to be the most important fascist revolutionary alive. Writer Spencer Sunshine described it as "the bible of the most extreme wing of the new generation of neo-Nazis", and noted it as "a strange book, mixing National Socialism with serial killers and a veneration of Charles Manson". Nicholas Goodrick-Clarke wrote of the work in 2002 that it "preached violence, racial strife and an all-out war against the hated 'System'", and that it paid "extravagant" tribute to many neo-Nazis.

Readership of the Siege newsletter was not large while it was in circulation, and the book was largely obscure. This changed in the 2010s when it was rediscovered by the neo-Nazi forum Iron March, who published another edition in 2015. As a result, Mason’s writings have inspired a global spike in militant neo-Nazi activity. Especially for younger neo-Nazis, since 2015 Siege has been a foundational text, arguably rivalling Mein Kampf. Counter-terrorists experts have found this concerning because Siege is at the "'shamelessly terroristic' end of right-wing extremism". According to the SPLC, the new generation of neo-Nazis are going through "total immersion in Mason’s teleology [...] they are challenging the established far-right and far-left with their eagerness to perpetrate violence." According to the International Centre for Counter-Terrorism it has "a radicalising effect on right-wing extremists". Although fringe ideology even among right-wing extremists, "Siege Culture has underpinned many of the recent counter terrorism cases linked to the extreme-right in the UK" according to Centre for Research and Evidence on Security Threats.

The meme "Read Siege" and hashtag #ReadSiege became popular with neo-Nazis, especially after the Unite the Right rally in 2017. Various terms grew out of the movement around the book. The subculture "Siege Culture" by neo-Nazis and counter-extremism experts alike. Other members of the far-right derided those interested in the book as "Siege Fags", and convincing others to adopt the book's ideology was called "Siege Pilling". Within Siege Culture, Fascism is the highest truth and the natural state in which whites dominate all others. As a result, Siege Culture believes that any softening of the message to increase their appeal is impossible, and that any form of compromise is inherently flawed. Siege Culture is critical of other right-wingers who are seen as being uncommitted and resulting in a belief that they represent a revolutionary vanguard with access to special truths. Siege has also been distributed by Nordic Resistance Movement and the American Futurist founded by former Atomwaffen members.

== Crimes and organizations tied to Siege ==
Globally, Siege Culture has been connected to many terror plots. The Counter Extremism Project connected Siege Culture to 25 terrorists in 2020 alone. For example, in Finland in 2021 five men who according to the Finnish security services adhered to Siege Culture were arrested with weapons and explosives. As a result of his writing of Siege, Mason has been designated a terrorist entity in Canada.

According to TASS, the Primorsky court of St. Petersburg declared on August 14, 2023 that "The court recognized [Siege] by James Mason as extremist material prohibited from distribution on the territory of the Russian Federation". The court recognized that Siege had inspired, among others, an Atomwaffen Division cell in Buryatia that planned attacks against racial minorities and drug users. The court banned 11 websites that hosted and distributed Siege.

In a memo, the FBI mentions a "Siege network," which they describe as a "global network of online channels and real-world groups that cooperate with each other in analog reality." Likewise Europol noted on "Terrorist Situation and Trend Report" for 2022 that "SIEGE and Accelerationism, both with significant potential for inciting violence, were the most prominent ideologies in 2021, especially attracting young people radicalised online."

=== Siege Culture organizations ===
- Antipodean Resistance is an Australian accelerationist neo-Nazi group, which originated on the Iron March forum.
- Atomwaffen Division is an accelerationist neo-Nazi terror organization founded in 2015 by Brandon Russell. Members have been linked to murders and violent plots.
- The Base is a neo-Nazi, white supremacist and accelerationist paramilitary hate group and training network, formed in 2018 by Rinaldo Nazzaro and active in several countries.
- Nordic Resistance Movement is a pan-Nordic neo-Nazi organization that adheres to accelerationism.
- Terrorgram is a neo-Fascist group of Telegram channels, who promote militant accelerationism.

British neo-Nazi group National Action also cited as a 'proto-Siege group', which marked the beginning of Siege Culture in the UK.
