= Povl Riis-Knudsen =

Danish neo-Nazi (born 1949)

Povl Heinrich Riis-Knudsen
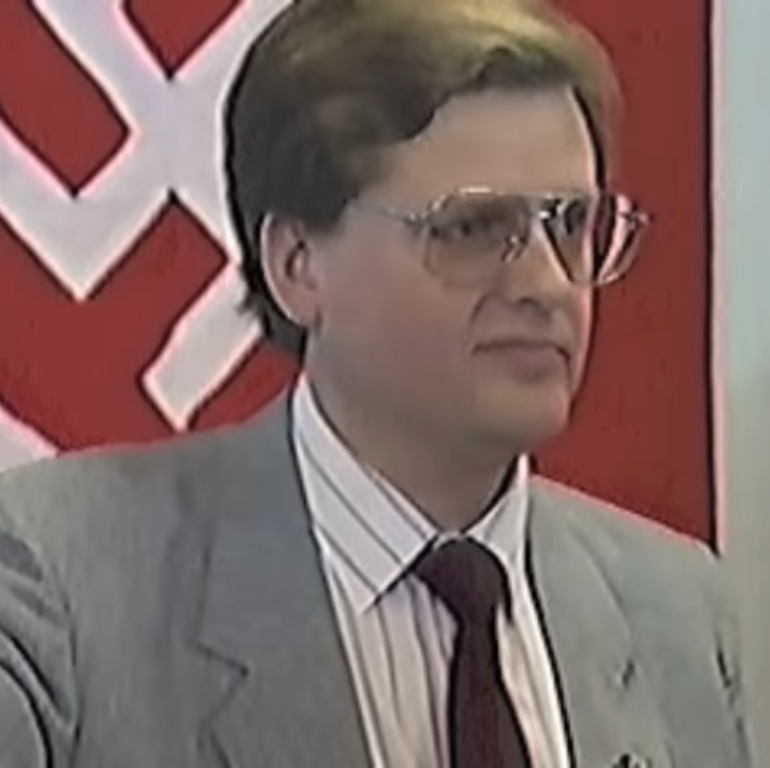
- Povl Heinrich Riis-Knudsen speaks at the DNSB meeting

Personal details
- Born: Povl Heinrich Riis-Knudsen; 29 October 1949 (age 76) Denmark
- Party: National Socialist Movement of Denmark

Povl Heinrich Riis-Knudsen is a Danish neo-Nazi, prominent in the US as well as Denmark. Riis-Knudsen is known as the author of the articles National Socialism: A Left Wing Movement (1984) and National Socialism: The Biological World View (1987), as well as for having been involved with Matt Koehl of the American Nazi Party.

== Life and ideas ==
Riis-Knudsen first came to prominence when Matt Koehl took charge of the World Union of National Socialists (WUNS) and sought out Riis-Knudsen, already a leading neo-Nazi in Denmark, as his European contact. Riis-Knudsen, who felt that Nazism in Europe was hamstrung by the continent's historical experience, welcomed the move as he felt the United States had less of this and so he became General Secretary of the WUNS. At the time he at the head of an expansion for the group with the likes of Gaston-Armand Amaudruz in Switzerland, Ramon Bau in Spain and Victor DeCecco in Italy affiliating. Before long, however, Riis-Knudsen lost this position as he did not then share Koehl's desire to form a religion based on Nazism, claiming that "normal people were few and far between" when he visited Koehl's supporters. Following the breakdown of this relationship, Riis-Knudsen began to concentrate more on writing.

His seminal work was the 1987 article National Socialism - The Biological World View in which he argued that Nazism had its basis in the laws of nature and was in effect the culmination of the search for truth as the founding principle of life. Much of what he has written is based on the mysticism of Savitri Devi.

He also published National Socialism - A Left Wing Movement (1984), which argued that the revolutionary nature of Nazism set it apart from the reactionary ways of the right and so Nazism was in fact a left wing ideology.

According to Riis-Knudsen in National Socialism - A Left Wing Movement:

"It is a historical fact that nothing good has ever come out of the right wing. If it had not been for such revolutionaries as Copernicus, Kepler, Giordano Bruno and Galileo, we should still believe that the earth is flat and the center of the universe. When capitalism developed, the establishment made no attempt to solve the social problems resulting from the industrial revolution, but went on to exploit the new working class mercilessly— thus giving rise to revolutionary thoughts as expressed in Marxist ideology. And all the necessary and just social improvements we have seen during the past 100 years have only been introduced after hard pressure from the left wing, with right-wing conservatives in constant retreat, pitifully trying to preserve as much as possible for themselves."

Riis-Knudsen had come to look for more of an accommodation with communism, becoming part of a tendency in the European far right at the time to think this way. Alongside Jean-François Thiriart, he rejected abstract Marxism but was nonetheless attracted to the practice of communism. He even went as far as to visit the Soviet Union in 1978, a move which led to controversy in the Danish press who knew Riis-Knudsen as a neo-Nazi. He came to view Russia, rather than the United States, as the saviours of the Aryan race and made this break clear in A Left Wing Movement.

In Denmark itself Riis-Knudsen served as chairman of the Danmarks Nationalsocialistiske Bevægelse (National Socialist Movement of Denmark), an openly neo-Nazi organisation founded in 1970. The movement had around 1000 members by 1988. In this capacity Riis-Knudsen built up a network of contacts across Europe, working with German Michael Kühnen and Holocaust denier Thies Christophersen. He also wrote for CEDADE in a special edition of their bulletin which also featured Salvador Borrego, Wilfred von Oven and Richard Edmonds. In more recent years his international contacts have included Mark Cotterill and former New Order spokesman Martin Kerr.

Riis-Knudsen caused further controversy in the late 1980s when he appeared on TV calling for Denmark to be purged of all immigrants, the death penalty for anyone caught transmitting AIDS, labour camps for his political opponents and sterilization of non-whites. The appearance caused outrage in Norway and Sweden and was banned from being screened in Denmark. He has also declared his support for Palestine against Israel and a sympathy with Islamic fundamentalism, albeit balanced against a desire to see Islam expelled from Europe.

Expelled from the DNSB in 1992 for "race mixing" in an engagement to a Palestinian Christian whom Riis-Knudsen argued was a "white Arab", As a consequence the DNSB left the WUNS and switched its allegiance to the NSDAP/AO, a rival international network. Riis-Knudsen has since turned his attention to running his own publishing house, Nordland-Verlag, from Aalborg. This has courted controversy as it has published a series of books on the topic of Holocaust denial in the Danish language.

Riis-Knudsen has blamed the Western countries for making the 2022 Russian invasion of Ukraine necessary. He has claimed that the Bucha massacre was staged. He has claimed that the Ukrainian president Volodymyr Zelenskyy does not work for Ukraine but rather for some undisclosed powers and that the goal for Zelenskyy is a nuclear war. Riis-Knudsen has urged China to invade Taiwan.
