= Joseph Tommasi =

American neo-Nazi (1951–1975)

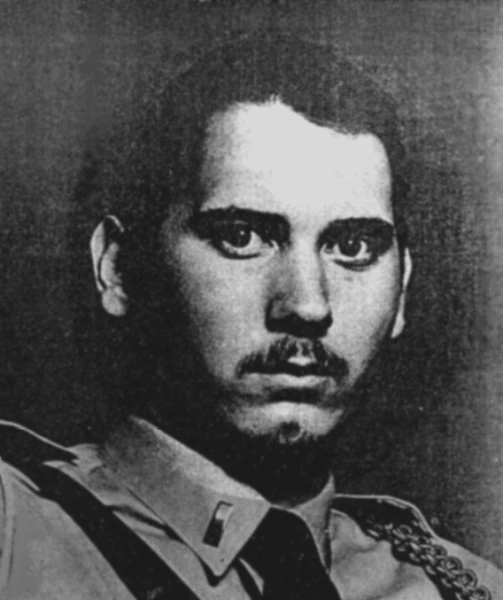
- 1970s photo of Tommasi
- Born: Joseph Charles Tommasi; April 15, 1951; Hartford, Connecticut, U.S.
- Died: August 15, 1975 (aged 24); El Monte, California, U.S.
- Cause of death: Gunshot wound
- Organizations: National Socialist White People's Party; National Socialist Liberation Front

Joseph Charles Tommasi (April 15, 1951 – August 15, 1975) was an American neo-Nazi who led the National Socialist Liberation Front (NSLF), an openly terroristic neo-Nazi group. A former member of the National Socialist White People's Party (NSWPP), he was removed from that group for unclear reasons in 1973. He was known for his radical views and explicit advocacy of violent action, which put him at odds with most other neo-Nazis of the time. Tommasi was murdered by a member of the NSWPP in 1975, at the age of 24. He continues to ideologically influence neo-Nazis.

Tommasi officially joined the National Socialist White People's Party at the age of 17, becoming the leader of their Californian branch. In 1971, Tommasi was offered several thousand dollars from the Committee to Re-elect the President as part of a plan to help Richard Nixon win the 1972 presidential election by getting George Wallace removed from the California ballot. When Tommasi was paid less than he was initially offered, he spoke out about the deal to the press, contributing to a media scandal. Tommasi's behavior was sometimes controversial among his associates, and he was known to flout the behavioral norms of neo-Nazis.

When the NSWPP's leader Matt Koehl suspended Tommasi from the organization in 1973, Tommasi proceeded to found the NSLF as an independent organization with a far more militant ideology. Members of the NSLF committed or took credit for several bombings, shootings, and arsons. The NSLF also distributed propaganda, including the periodical Siege. On August 15, 1975, Tommasi was fatally shot by NSWPP member Jerry Jones after a dispute at the NSWPP's local headquarters. Jones was convicted of second-degree murder and sentenced to 300 days in jail. The NSLF continued for a few years under different leaders, with Tommasi immediately succeeded as leader by David Rust, before it disbanded in 1986.

Tommasi rejected conservatism and the social norms of most contemporary neo-Nazis, declaring himself a revolutionary and embracing elements of the counterculture. He advocated armed guerrilla warfare against the U.S. government, and was in favor of anarchy and lawlessness so that the "system" could be attacked without protection. Tommasi was an early proponent of neo-Nazi accelerationism and lone wolf terrorism, and he also influenced the development of the neo-Nazi conception of the leaderless resistance tactic. Many neo-Nazis saw Tommasi as a martyr after his death. Based on a revival of Tommasi's Siege periodical, his associate James Mason wrote the influential neo-Nazi book Siege, which celebrates Tommasi and includes many of his writings.

== Early life ==
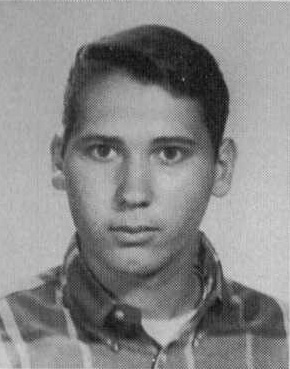
Tommasi in his sophomore yearbook photo in 1967

Joseph Charles Tommasi (Note: His surname is frequently misspelled as "Tomassi".) was born April 15, 1951 in Hartford, Connecticut. (Note: Some sources say he was born in Virginia. According to both the FBI, and an article that contained an interview with Tommasi, he was from Connecticut.) He had Italian ancestry, and had two younger sisters. He described his parents as middle class and conservative. His interest in Nazism began after a research project on Nazi Germany in the eighth grade. He stated his ideology was "self-afflicted" and that he believed he was born a Nazi.

Tommasi was raised in El Monte, California, and attended El Monte High School. He did not join any clubs at the school, but was in the school band as a trumpet player. His classmates and acquaintances described him as odd; interviewed by a student journalist for the Daily Trojan, none had an explanation for his behavior. His high school band director stated that Tommasi was "the nicest guy you'd ever want to meet", but that he was "kind of like a case of Dr. Jekyll and Mr. Hyde". A classmate recounted that he constantly defended the Nazis in class. The El Monte High School administration refused to let students broadcast editorials over the loudspeaker for fear that Tommasi would utilize it.

Tommasi later said that in high school he had wanted to become a police officer, but abandoned this after realizing it conflicted with his political ideology. In December 1966, when Tommasi was 15, he was recorded by the Federal Bureau of Investigation as attending a meeting of George Lincoln Rockwell's American Nazi Party (ANP). His parents greatly disapproved of his beliefs. When he was a sophomore, his parents learned that he was a neo-Nazi when they saw him on television attending a Nazi demonstration. In response, they moved cities to Walnut, California, to keep him away from the party. This failed to dissuade him. In 1967, Tommasi was reported to the FBI by a teacher for passing out neo-Nazi propaganda to his classmates.

== Politics ==
=== National Socialist White People's Party ===
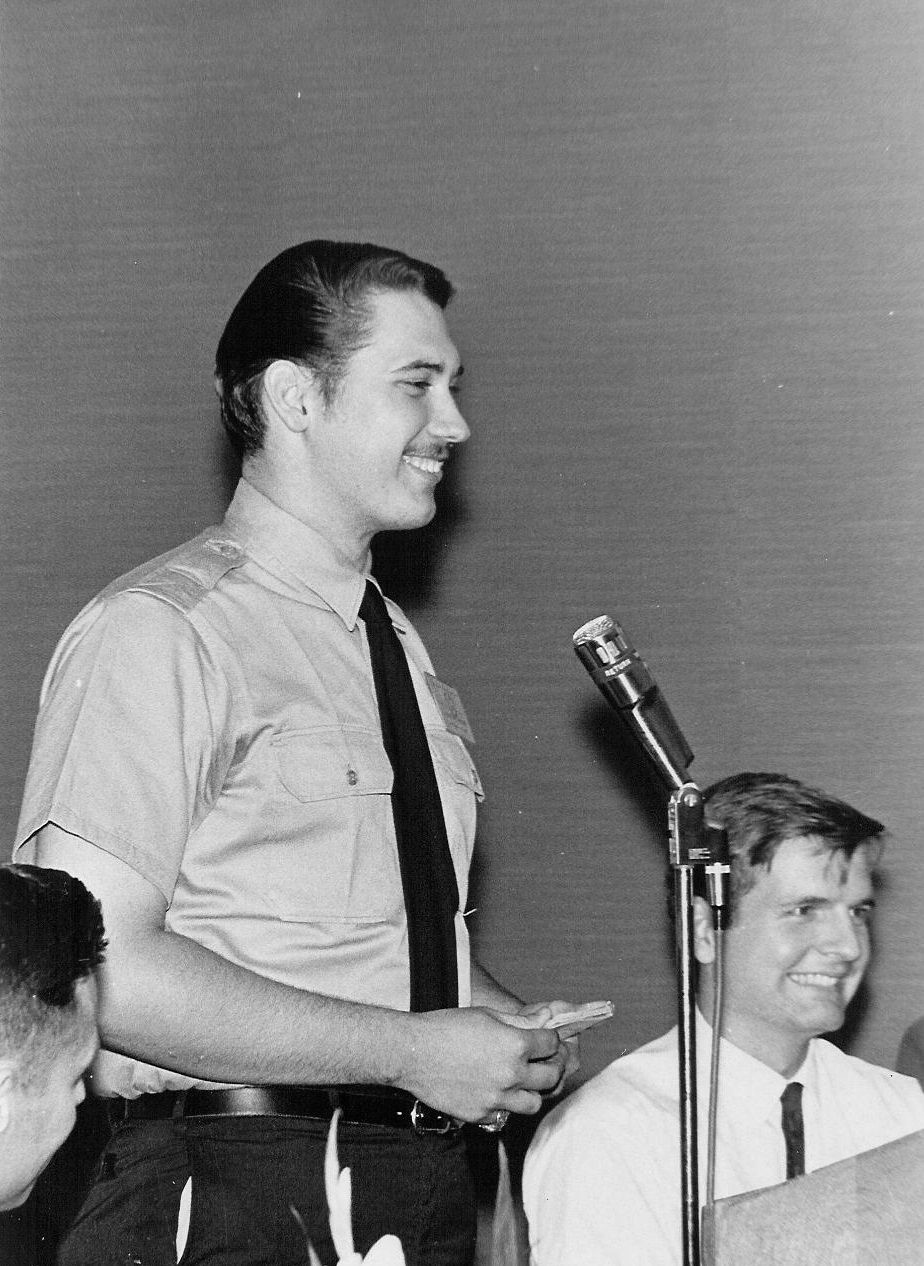
Tommasi at the NSWPP's second annual congress in 1970

At the age of 17, Tommasi joined his local branch of the ANP, which by then had changed its name to the National Socialist White People's Party (NSWPP). Rockwell had been murdered by that time, and had been succeeded as leader of the NSWPP by Matt Koehl. The California branch that Tommasi joined was known to be especially fractious, even relative to the rest of the group. As part of the NSWPP, Tommasi was involved in several protests against leftist movements, and clashes with them.

He became one of the party's better organizers, and quickly ascended in the NSWPP's hierarchy. In October 1969 Tommasi was promoted to the local leader of the party in California; Harold Covington was a member of his unit, as was Martin Kerr. Tommasi was publicly disliked by some of his associates due to his Italian heritage and "less than Nordic complexion"; he was derisively nicknamed "Tomato Joe" by rival neo-Nazis, while the FBI nicknamed him the "Tomato Head Fuhrer". Despite this, he was respected by other neo-Nazis due to his sheer fanaticism. Tommasi encouraged other members of the party to learn military tactics and taught them how to make Molotov cocktails.

Explicit discussion of committing violence and illegal acts was largely taboo in the NSWPP. Some lower ranking members contemplated it, though not openly; the exception to this was their ideological leader William Luther Pierce, who openly advocated violence. Tommasi operated phone lines broadcasting the group's messages, including messages from Pierce which advocated political killings. In one, Pierce advocated for senators to be killed. In March 1969, Californian authorities discontinued a phone line Tommasi operated after it played a prerecorded message from Pierce which advocated murdering black people.

In 1969, Tommasi, backed by Pierce, launched the National Socialist Liberation Front (NSLF) as a youth wing of the American Nazi Party; alternatively, Pierce may have launched it himself and Tommasi came to be involved. (Note: Sources are inconsistent on how and by who the original NSLF was founded. Jeffrey Kaplan wrote that it was founded by Tommasi, with the encouragement of Pierce. Spencer Sunshine says that this is incorrect, and that the NSLF was originally founded by Pierce with the assistance of Robert Lloyd and Koehl.) Despite their ideological similarities, Tommasi personally disliked Pierce, and when Koehl later had Pierce kicked out of the party Tommasi sided with Koehl. In September of that year, Tommasi attended the NSWPP's First Party Congress, where he met fellow neo-Nazi James Mason. At the next year's congress, he gave a speech calling for revolution. In September 1970, Tommasi was made one of the seven members of the NSWPP National Council, which advised Koehl. According to the FBI, as of that year Tommasi was working as an assembly line worker.

The NSWPP's El Monte headquarters was decorated in swastikas and their presence irritated their neighbors. The city of El Monte tried to fine them, and their neighbors wanted them evicted from their property, but these attempts to get them to leave were unsuccessful. Tommasi ended up buying the property. In January 1972, a group of protestors, including 100 members of the Jewish Defense League (JDL) and 900 others, demonstrated outside their El Monte headquarters. The protest escalated into fistfights and the throwing of small explosives, rocks, and other objects at the building. Tommasi led the sixty members of the NSWPP at the branch in standing opposite them with rifles. 40 of the demonstrators were arrested. In February 1972, Irv Rubin, a JDL militant, was arrested and charged for assault with intent to commit murder for allegedly shooting at Tommasi. Charges were later dropped due to a lack of evidence. When Thomas Bradley, the first black mayor of Los Angeles, was inaugurated, Tommasi led NSWPP members in a demonstration against him. In 1973, Tommasi married his girlfriend, Rose.

==== Committee to Re-elect the President involvement ====
In November 1971, Tommasi was offered US$5,000 (equivalent to $39,749 in 2025) from Richard Nixon's election fundraising group, the Committee to Re-elect the President (CRP), to help them get George Wallace's American Independent Party (AIP) removed from the Californian ballot in the 1972 presidential election. Tommasi was hired either by a CRP associate or by the CRP itself, and they were connected through a former Wallace supporter who had left and joined the NSWPP. Tommasi was told to convince AIP voters to register instead as Republican, as due to California's election rules, if there were too few registered voters for a party, they would be knocked off the ballot. The CRP feared that Wallace would split the vote in a 3-way race, and believed that if he was not an option his prospective voters would go for Nixon. The goal was to get the AIP's numbers either below 11,000 or less than 1/15th of 1% of all registered voters in the state.

The plan did not work, and the AIP's voter registration actually rose during the period the plan was enacted. Tommasi's involvement was also a failure, as he only came up with 4 men for the plan instead of his promised 20. Tommasi was paid less than he was promised (US$1,200 vs US$5,000), and claimed the CRP had cheated the neo-Nazis. In response, Tommasi leaked the story to the press, calling it "a beautiful opportunity to screw both sides". This initially resulted in only local news reports, but after the reveal of the Watergate scandal and CRP's involvement in it, the story made national news, including in The New York Times. Hugh W. Sloan Jr. testified about the plan to the United States Senate Watergate Committee, and it was included in the final report of the Committee.

Robert Walters, the right-wing activist who created the plan, initially denied any tie to the CRP and said he had come up with the idea on his own. He also said he did not remember the Nazis. Another participant in the plan disputed Walters's telling of events; reporters ultimately found checks from Walters to Tommasi, after which Walters conceded that the neo-Nazis "might have been involved". Tommasi spent the money on a down payment on a property for the NSWPP, and the funds helped prevent the California group from collapsing. The plan was described by the Watergate Committee as a "complete failure numerically, according to all participants", though the Los Angeles Free Press noted it had perhaps worked out for Tommasi.

==== Expulsion ====
Various aspects of Tommasi's behavior offended other neo-Nazis. Fellow neo-Nazi Martin Kerr described him as "narcissistic, hot-headed and undisciplined", while another associate described Tommasi as "as flamboyant and out-going as possible". The NSWPP had strict behavioral rules, which Tommasi flouted in several ways, including by letting those serving under him bring their girlfriends over to the headquarters, and allowing them to smoke marijuana. Tommasi rejected the behavioral norms of other neo-Nazis, and himself smoked marijuana and listened to rock and roll music. Koehl was unhappy with him, and forced Tommasi to sign an agreement that reined in his behavior. This agreement was apparently violated when Tommasi held military training exercises. Despite their conflicts, Tommasi was loyal to Koehl, but Tommasi was abruptly ejected from the NSWPP in 1973. In September 1973, the day before a party congress, Tommasi was removed from his position as leader, and suspended for six months, though initially not expelled. According to Kerr, Tommasi did not renew his membership in February 1974, but said he was only actually expelled proper when he founded the NSLF in March 1974.

A variety of possible reasons have been given for his ousting from the party. Among them were: the extremity of his views, smoking marijuana, listening to rock and roll, leading armed maneuvers without proper authorization, bringing a woman into headquarters, the Nixon campaign affair, misusing funds, or having long hair. James Mason suggested it was probably the marijuana and him bringing over his girlfriends that resulted in his exit, while Tommasi himself said it was "fear and paranoia" from the leaders who believed he had too much power. Scholar Spencer Sunshine argued that these were all a cover for the real reason, which was that Koehl was jealous of Tommasi and looking to centralize his control of the group. Tommasi was one of many members who left or were kicked out of the NSWPP as a result of Koehl's leadership.

=== National Socialist Liberation Front ===
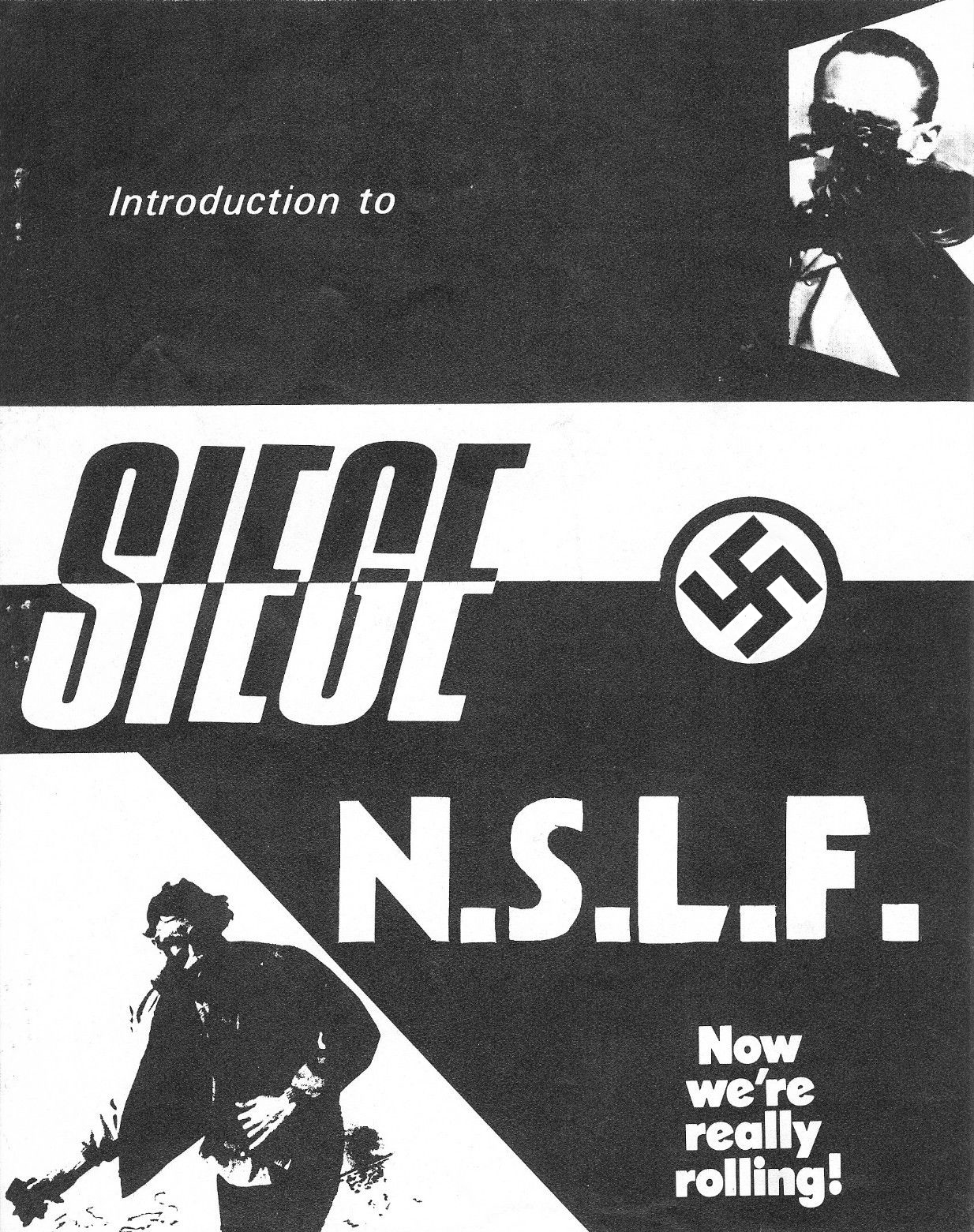
Cover of the first issue of Tommasi's Siege newsletter

In 1974, after his exit from the NSWPP, Tommasi founded another National Socialist Liberation Front as a separate organization, which had virtually no connection to the original NSLF. The new NSLF was openly terroristic; the Anti-Defamation League described it as "the most violent of the Nazi splinter groups". Tommasi took many of his followers with him into the new organization. The Los Angeles NSWPP continued without Tommasi. The NSLF's first meeting was held March 2, 1974, which attracted 43 people. The NSLF grew to have several locations in Southern California, and members in several other states.

The NSLF was modeled off of New Left militancy, specifically the Symbionese Liberation Army and the Weather Underground. Members abandoned the previously standard Nazi outfits and appearances, seeing this as bringing law enforcement attention. They dressed more like leftist radicals and wore army clothes; Tommasi said that an NSLF member "has no uniform. He could be the bearded long hair sitting next to you on the bus, or the clean-cut store clerk. He could be anyone anywhere." Tommasi expressed his disagreement with the NSWPP politically, viewing their attempts to avoid illegal action as ineffective.

With Tommasi's creation of the NSLF, he created a political statement, "Building the Revolutionary Party", which declared their aims and which first appeared in the second issue of Siege. It opened with a Maoist slogan, "Political Power Stems From the Barrel of a Gun". They also opened a bookstore, The New Order Bookstore, which closed because the renter refused to renew the lease. During his leadership of the NSLF, Tommasi was open about his leadership and gave multiple television and newspapers interviews about the group. Tommasi's wife Rose participated in the NSLF, including after her husband's death, until it was realized that she was pregnant.

Tommasi and the NSLF distributed propaganda, utilizing pictures showing destroyed buildings and images of the aftermath of terrorist targets. The NSLF at this time had two periodicals: the more well-known Siege, and the National Socialist Review. James Mason claimed Tommasi took the name of Siege from a book about the Weather Underground, but there is no book by this name about the Weather Underground. Spencer Sunshine proposed that Tommasi had actually taken the title from the book Miami and the Siege of Chicago by Norman Mailer, which discussed a conflict between the Weather Underground's predecessor group and the police. In 2026, Sunshine said that Martin Kerr, who knew Tommasi, clarified that the title had actually come from the 1969 Edwin Corley novel Siege. The plot of the book focuses around a group of radical black nationalists who plot the establishment of a black ethnostate; according to Kerr, Tommasi read the book and was inspired by it, selling copies of the book.

The NSLF took credit for several bombings, arsons, and shootings. There was a surface NSLF which numbered about forty, and a core group of members committed to lone wolf violence (about four people), who committed illegal acts. In February 1975, they teargassed a rally to re-open the Rosenberg case and bombed the Socialist Workers Party (SWP) headquarters two days later. The NSLF targeted the SWP on several times. Interviewed about the bombing of the SWP, Tommasi said that he could not deny involvement, though he also refused to say they were certainly involved. He admitted to the teargassing, which he called a success. In addition to targeting left-wingers, the NSLF also targeted the NSWPP unit that Tommasi had formerly led. Despite attacking several of their members and claiming to have firebombed their headquarters, Tommasi contacted Koehl, tried to work with him, and described the relationship between the two parties as "very good". The NSLF also bombed a left-wing bookstore. They continued to target the SWP, and in response, the SWP criticized the police for failing to take action against the NSLF. As a result of the bombings, Tommasi came under heavy police surveillance.

== Murder ==
Two weeks before Tommasi's death, he remarked to an interviewer for the underground newspaper the Los Angeles Free Press that he may not reach his thirtieth birthday. On August 15, 1975, Tommasi was murdered in front of the headquarters of the NSWPP in El Monte. Tommasi and David Rust had driven to the NSWPP's headquarters, where 19-year-old Clyde Bingham and 18-year-old Jerry Keith Jones were serving as guards. When Bingham made an obscene gesture at them, Tommasi exited the car and started yelling at both men. One NSWPP member allegedly warned him that if he came any closer, he would be shot. An NSLF member later claimed that there had been orders to kill Tommasi if he came near the NSWPP's property. In the ensuing confrontation, Tommasi was shot in the head by Jones and died instantly. Numerous weapons were found at the headquarters in the aftermath once it was searched.

Jones was arrested for the murder. He and Tommasi had previously had a friendly relationship and according to another NSLF member Tommasi had invited him to join the NSLF. Jones pleaded guilty to second-degree murder for killing Tommasi. He was sentenced to 300 days in the county jail and placed on probation. He was released on time served. Bingham was initially charged with assault with a deadly weapon, but the charges were dropped.

Martin Kerr was quoted in the aftermath as saying that though the NSWPP "regret[ted] the incident", Tommasi had "got[ten] exactly what he deserved". Kerr blamed him for a campaign of attacks against the NSWPP, including a firebombing and a shooting, and called Tommasi's death "the result of two years of effort by Tommasi to destroy [the NSWPP]". Koehl mocked Tommasi's death in the party's paper, White Power, writing that:

Let the recent death of a certain individual who chose to wage war on the Party serve as a powerful warning that in the future the Party will actively defend itself against all those who seek to undermine and destroy it—who-ever they may be or whatever they may call themselves.

Tommasi was buried in Rose Hills Memorial Park. About forty people attended the funeral, and Tommasi's former teacher officiated.

== Views and ideology ==
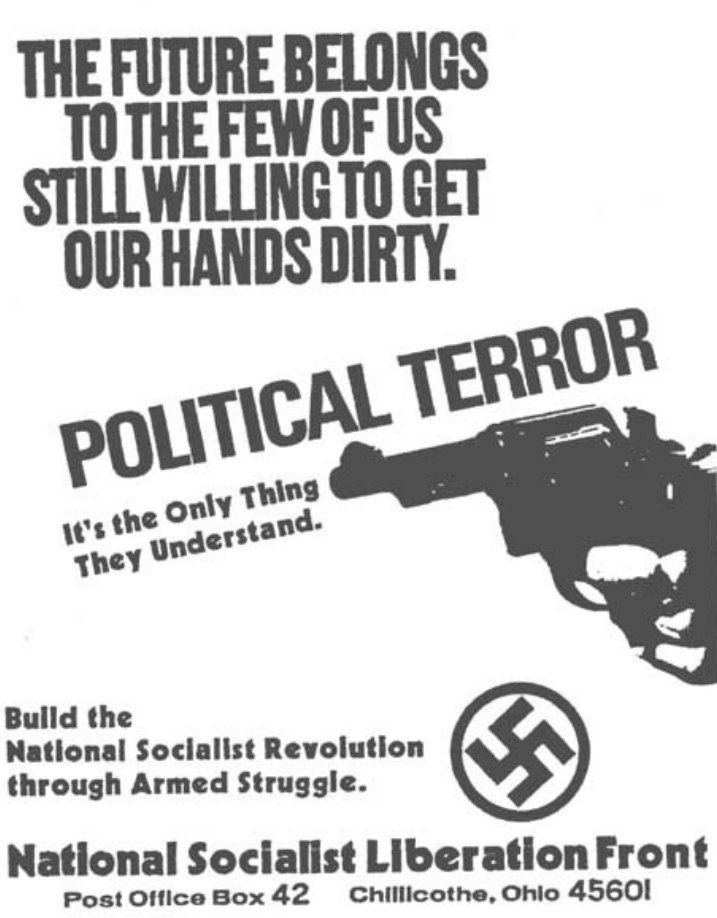
The "Political Terror" flyer, which became popular with neo-Nazis

Academic Jeffrey Kaplan described Tommasi's views as "extraordinarily radical", and said that they "frightened the conservative majority" of American neo-Nazis; Nicholas Goodrick-Clarke called his ideology millenarian and violent. A white supremacist, Tommasi claimed the human species constituted different "breeds", and said racial integration and interracial marriage were weapons to destroy the white race. He believed black people should be forced to resettle in Africa, and said the early settlers of the U.S. were justified in enslaving them. Despite this, when asked he said he rejected white separatism in favor of elimination of other races, saying white separatism was unrealistic due to the population of non-white people.

Tommasi believed in American exceptionalism, saying that the American neo-Nazis were "not Europeans and won't respond as Europeans" as "Americans tend to go against the 'grain' on practically everything". He expressed dislike of both the Ku Klux Klan and the John Birch Society, calling the former "medieval" and accused the latter of only caring about money. He believed in the antisemitic international Jewish banking conspiracy and that Jewish people had funded the communist Russian Revolution. In 1971, he called Adolf Hitler "the greatest man ever to set foot on this earth"; in an interview with a local journalist, he denied the Holocaust, but also said that if it had happened he would not care.

Tommasi rejected conservatism and embraced elements of the counterculture, describing himself as a revolutionary rather than a conservative. He believed conservatism was paralyzing the neo-Nazi movement, and rejected the "mass-action" strategy that had previously been practiced (the idea that they could ever win the public over to their side), as he believed this did not allow for genuine anti-state acts. He viewed the idea of creating a Nazi party in the United States with mass appeal to be "absurd", concluding in "Building the Revolutionary Party" that "National Socialist activities have never produced one significant political result in the U.S.A." In "Building the Revolutionary Party," Tommasi incorporated many of the New Left's theories on violent action and tactics; he wrote that "we will not make our most eloquent statement in courtrooms and at press conferences, but in the streets of Jew-Capitalist America".

In "Strategy for Revolution", Tommasi wrote that "The White Man has lost!" and that, as an "occupied people", they must "develop a totally different outlook". Hence, he rejected the mass strategy and instead advocated underground guerrilla warfare; if they could not obtain political power through elections, he said that they should focus on "hurting the Enemy through force and violence". An early proponent of the concept of accelerationism, he advocated the use of violence and chaos to heighten the tensions in society to bring about a revolution. He argued that neo-Nazis should "pray for victory and not an end to slaughter" and promoted anarchy and lawlessness so that white racist activists could "plunge the entire System to its death".

In either 1973 or 1974, Tommasi created the "Political Terror" flyer. It featured a .38 pistol and a swastika, and read:

THE FUTURE BELONGS TO THE FEW OF US WILLING TO GET OUR HANDS DIRTY.
POLITICAL TERROR: It's the only thing they understand.

This poster became famous among neo-Nazis and the NSLF's signature flyer. This poster was left at the scene of some of the NSLF's terrorist acts, and was reused by other white supremacists for decades after Tommasi's death. It was adopted by James Mason, as well as a variety of other white supremacist groups, including the American Front and the Abraxas Foundation. The flyer also made an appearance in the 1999 film Arlington Road.

== Legacy ==
Despite his early death, Tommasi left a substantial impact on the neo-Nazi movement. Spencer Sunshine argued that Tommasi's NSLF "played an important role in prying open neo-Nazism from the approach that had been in place for the 15 years since the founding of the American Nazi Party." Tommasi played a significant role in the development of the neo-Nazi conception of the leaderless resistance tactic, and he was an early advocate of far-right lone wolf terrorism. Scholars Bethan Johnson and Matthew Feldman noted the NSLF as "perhaps the first openly terroristic neo-Nazi cell in the US". The academic Jeffrey Kaplan argued that, had he not been murdered, Tommasi "may well be recognized as one of the three most important American National Socialists of the postwar era, in the company of George Lincoln Rockwell and William Pierce".

Kaplan said that Tommasi was one of the few neo-Nazis with leadership abilities since Rockwell, and one of the first to recognize that the "mass action" idea was, "short of an apocalyptic social collapse, simply not going to happen". Kaplan argued that Tommasi "marked the first attempt to adapt the stereotypical Nazi subculture of the 1950s to the youth culture of the late 1960s and early 1970s". He also described Tommasi and his ideology as living on in the "spirit" of Pierce's 1989 novel Hunter, the successor to Pierce's earlier novel The Turner Diaries. White supremacist Tom Metzger retrospectively praised Tommasi in the 1980s, writing that he had been "light years ahead of most of us at that time". Tommasi was treated as a martyr by other neo-Nazis, who revered him after his passing. The NSLF sold lithographs of him and the units of several Nazi movements took his name.

The California NSWPP moved their headquarters out of El Monte after Tommasi's death. Tommasi was succeeded as leader of the NSLF by David Rust. Rust continued the militant practices, aiming to make the group more militant than Tommasi, engaging in more attacks. In 1977, Rust was arrested for conspiracy to commit murder for allegedly plotting to kill Jerry Jones; he was ultimately sentenced to two years in prison for possessing an unlicensed silencer. In August 1977, as required by his probation, Rust ordered the group be disbanded. Tommasi's associate James Mason attempted to convince Rust to merge the NSLF with the National Socialist Movement (NSM). Rust refused but ordered all remaining NSLF units to coordinate with Mason. The NSM held a memorial rally for Tommasi in 1976. Despite ordering the group be disbanded, by this time, Rust had already been replaced as NSLF leader by John Harry Duffy, who led the group from 1977 to early 1981.

Mason revived the Siege periodical as his own effort in 1980, which he used to call for violent acts. Mason was dissatisfied with the direction Duffy's successor, Karl Hand, took the party: a more standard, non-militant direction, with uniformed political demonstrations and legality. In 1982, Hand and Mason agreed to split the group, and Mason took a splinter group to form the Universal Order, a group that promoted the ideas of Charles Manson as a continuation of Nazism, and took with him the periodical Siege. The NSLF finally came to an end in 1986 when Hand was convicted of attempted murder (stemming not from neo-Nazism, but rather a personal dispute with his neighbor). Hand then wrote a letter declaring his intention to merge the remainders of the NSLF with Tom Metzger's White Aryan Resistance. The NSLF became defunct.

Tommasi was a significant political influence on Mason, who reprinted his materials and used him as the cover of several periodicals he wrote for over the ensuing years. According to Sunshine, Mason "built a cult" around Tommasi, following his death. Mason's revival periodical was later collected into the influential neo-Nazi book Siege. Tommasi was celebrated in the resurrected Siege, and it included many of Tommasi's writings and NSLF documents. The originally planned cover of Siege featured Tommasi, though this was changed before its publication. Much of Siege is devoted to Tommasi; 40 pages of the book reference Tommasi, and many of the book's images involve him. In the 2010s, Tommasi was an ideological influence on the neo-Nazi terrorist group the Atomwaffen Division, who took influence from Mason, and Tommasi frequently appears in "Siege Culture" propaganda inspired by Mason's book.
