= National Socialist Liberation Front =

American neo-Nazi group

- Abbreviation: NSLF
- Leader: Joseph Tommasi (1969–75); David Rust (1975–77); John Duffy (1977–81); Karl Hand (1982–86)
- Founded: 1974
- Dissolved: 1986
- Headquarters: El Monte, California
- Ideology: Neo-Nazism
- Political position: Far-right

The National Socialist Liberation Front (NSLF) was an American neo-Nazi organization. The first NSLF was established in 1969 as a youth wing of the National Socialist White People's Party. In 1974, Joseph Tommasi founded another group of the same name, though it was almost entirely unrelated to the original NSLF barring his involvement. The new NSLF was known for its explicitly terroristic approach and actions. After Tommasi was murdered in 1975, he was succeeded successively by several different leaders. The NSLF was shuttered by its final leader, Karl Hand, in 1986.

== History ==
=== Original NSLF ===
The National Socialist White People's Party (NSWPP), originally the American Nazi Party, was an American neo-Nazi political organization founded by George Lincoln Rockwell. Following Rockwell's assassination in 1967, he was succeeded as leader of the NSWPP by Matt Koehl. The original National Socialist Liberation Front was established in April 1969 at the NSWPP conference. Sources are inconsistent on how and by who the original NSLF was founded. Jeffrey Kaplan wrote that it was founded by Joseph Tommasi, with the encouragement of William Luther Pierce. Spencer Sunshine says that this is incorrect, and that the NSLF was originally founded by Pierce, with assistance from Robert Lloyd and Koehl.

It was the youth wing of the National Socialist White People's Party, describing itself as the "Student Activist Arm of the National Socialist Movement". The NSLF primarily aimed to simply attract new members, with limited attention-grabbing stunts. One of the NSLF's recruits during this period was Louisiana State University student David Duke.

The original NSLF published the National Socialist Liberator newspaper, which was published from May 1969 to April 1970. Most of the group's materials, including the newspaper, were printed by NSWPP member James Mason. The newspaper aimed to appeal to contemporary rebellious students from a right-wing perspective, criticizing the New Left, the Vietnam War, and the black nationalist movement. Despite this, the newspaper also ran comments from black nationalist writer Amiri Baraka, when they focused on Jews. The newspaper was pro-environmentalism and called for executing corporate officials from polluting companies.

=== New NSLF ===
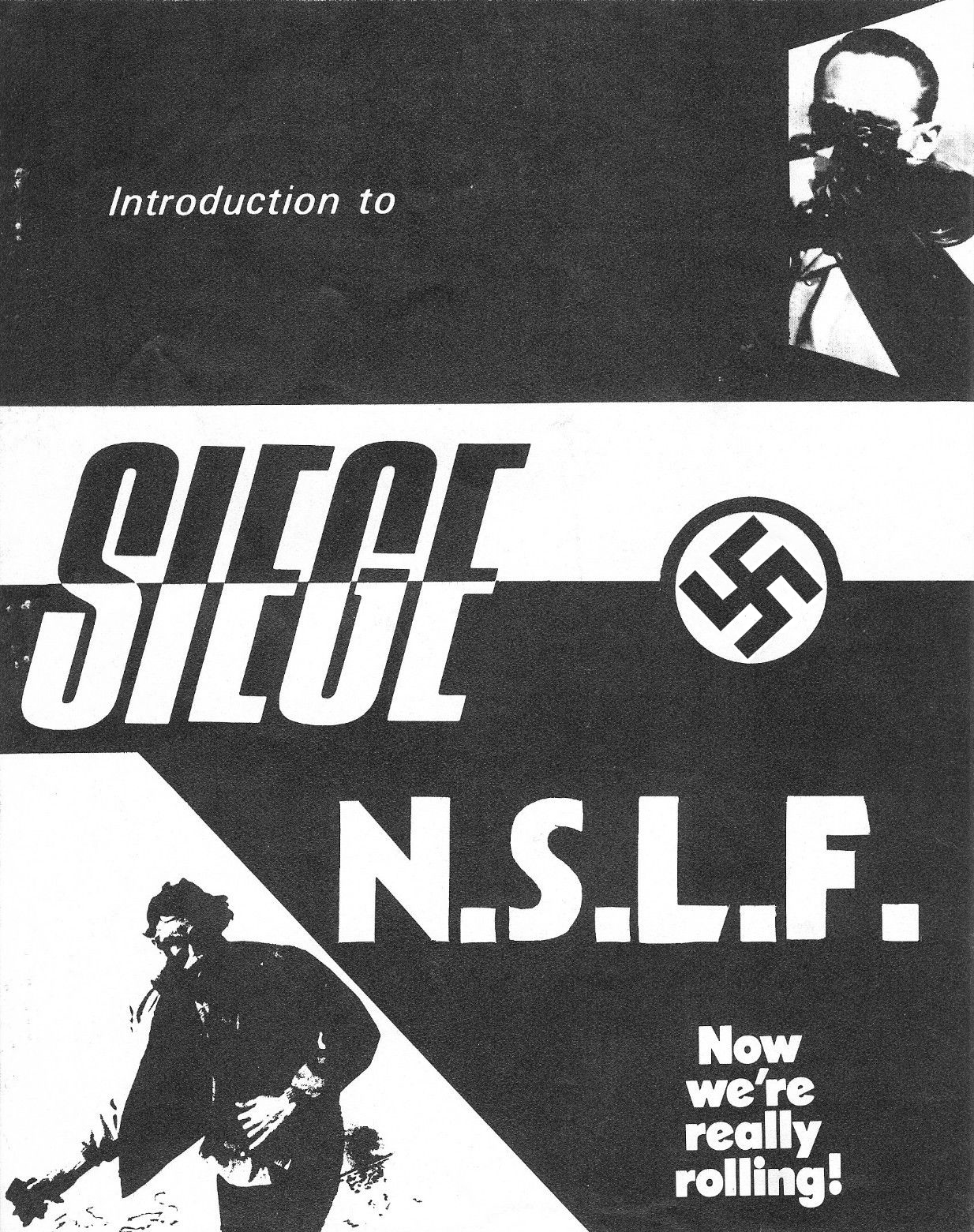
Cover of the first issue of Tommasi's original Siege newsletter

Koehl expelled Tommasi from the Party in 1973, claiming that he was smoking marijuana and entertaining young women at the party headquarters, as well as misusing party funds. In 1974, Tommasi founded another National Socialist Liberation Front as a separate organization, which had virtually no connection to the original NSLF. The NSLF was reconstituted as a new organization on March 2, 1974, "in the presence of 43 National Socialist revolutionaries" in El Monte, California. Tommasi took many of his followers with him into the new organization. The NSLF claimed that they had taken most of the Los Angeles NSWPP's members, and said members of the NSWPP were at risk of being expelled for even talking to Tommasi.

The NSLF took credit for several bombings, arsons, and shootings. They took credit for a teargassing of a February 1975 rally to re-open the Rosenberg case, and the bombing of the Socialist Workers Party (SWP) headquarters two days later. The NSLF had conflicted with the SWP. Interviewed, Tommasi said that he could not deny involvement in the bombing, though he also refused to say they were certainly involved. He admitted to the teargassing, which he called a success. In addition to targeting left-wingers, the NSLF also targeted the NSWPP unit that Tommasi had formerly run, which was still being operated out of his old house. The NSLF also bombed a left-wing bookstore. They repeatedly targeted the SWP. In response, the SWP criticized the police for failing to take action against the NSLF. The NSLF was modeled off of the New Left, and also relaxed the prohibition on some drugs.

They declared war against the left-wing and what they called the "Jew capitalist U.S. government". There was a surface NSLF which numbered about forty, and a core group of members committed to lone wolf violence (about four people), who committed illegal acts. Some actions may have actually been perpetrated by an anti-Communist Cuban group who the NSLF had an alliance with, who Tommasi called the "provisional wing". Other members of the NSLF denied this. Most initial members were not committed to the violence of the party; Jeffrey Kaplan noted that "few [...] were sufficiently suicidal to act on Tommasi’s rhetoric".

The NSLF opened a bookstore, The New Order Bookstore, which closed because the renter refused to renew the lease. Tommasi and the NSLF distributed propaganda, utilizing pictures showing destroyed buildings and images of the aftermath of terrorist targets. The NSLF had two periodicals: the National Socialist Review and the more well-known Siege. Units of the group were formed in Cincinnati, Buffalo, NY, Wilmington, Delaware and Louisiana.

=== Post-Tommasi's death ===
Tommasi was killed at the El Monte headquarters of the NSWPP in August 1975. Tommasi was succeeded as leader of the NSLF by David Rust. He continued the militant practices, aiming to make the group more militant than Tommasi, engaging in more attacks. In 1977, he was arrested for conspiracy to commit murder for allegedly plotting to kill Jerry Jones; he was instead sentenced to two years in prison for possessing an unlicensed silencer. In August 1977, as required by his probation, Rust ordered the group be disbanded. Tommasi's associate James Mason attempted to convince Rust to merge the NSLF with the National Socialist Movement (NSM), who refused but ordered all remaining NSLF units to coordinate with him. The NSLF's foreign contacts included the National Democratic Party which distributed NSLF propaganda as leaflets in Finland.

By this time, Rust had already been replaced as leader by John Harry Duffy, who led the group from 1977 to early 1981. Duffy suggested to Mason that they revive Siege, but this was not done due to funds and issues in Duffy's personal life, including a murder charge. In 1979, Duffy, the Delaware leader of the NSLF and two others were arrested "on charges of rape, aggravated assault and threatening to kill" a female member of the Jewish Defense League who had attempted to infiltrate the group. According to her the men lured her to a hotel room, handcuffed her and sexually assaulted her, breaking her wrists. In 1981, Duffy was succeeded as leader by Karl Hand.

Mason was dissatisfied with the direction Hand took the party, a more standard, non-militant direction, uniformed political demonstrations and legality. In 1982, Hand and Mason agreed on a split, and Mason took a splinter group to form the Universal Order, a group that promoted the ideas of Charles Manson as a continuation of Nazism, and took with him the periodical Siege. By that time Karl Hand headed the group and published Defiance. Mason revived the Siege periodical as his own effort in 1980, which he used to call for violent acts. The NSLF finally came to an end in 1986 when Hand was convicted of attempted murder after shooting a man twice in the stomach; the charge was unrelated to his Nazi activities, the result of a dispute Hand had with his neighbor. He was sentenced to 15 years of hard labor. Hand then wrote a letter declaring his intention to merge the remainders of the NSLF with Tom Metzger's White Aryan Resistance. The NSLF became defunct.

== Views and organization ==
The new NSLF was openly terroristic; the Anti-Defamation League described it as "the most violent of the Nazi splinter groups". The NSLF was most significant in its open advocacy of guerrilla war against the government, which members actually attempted to enact. The NSLF broke with established Nazi tradition, eschewing brownshirt uniforms and abandoning attempts to raise a "mass movement" of supporters to win power through legal means. Instead, Tommasi argued that it was best for small bands of "National Socialist revolutionaries" to arm themselves and conduct guerrilla warfare.

Women were allowed to participate in all NSLF activities, including their guerilla action. They had several female members. Publicly, gay people explicitly disavowed, as was the gay Nazi group the National Socialist League. NSLF propaganda included a cartoon of a family murdering their gay son; despite this, at least two allegedly bisexual women were members of the NSLF. In private during their involvement in the NSLF, Rust and Mason were more ambivalent, saying they would accept help from anyone, regardless of their sexuality, provided they did not embarrass the movement and were masculine in presentation. Hence they made some affiliations with the League while they were leading. After they left, this ceased.

The new NSLF was structured with two tiers, a legal "aboveground" membership - which at most included forty members - and a smaller "underground" that was dedicated to violent, revolutionary action. This group included Tommasi, Karl Hand, David Rust and James Mason.

== Periodicals ==
Original NSLF

- The National Socialist Liberator. Arlington, Virginia. May 1969 – April 1970.

New NSLF

- Siege. El Monte, California. 1974.
- National Socialist Review. Panorama City, California. Jan 1975 – 1976.

Post-Tommasi NSLF

- Siege (Mason's revival). Chillicothe, Ohio. 1980 – 1982 (became publication of Universal Order)
- Defiance. Buffalo, New York: M. Stachowski 1980 –
- National Socialist Observer. Kenner, Louisiana:. Sept. 1984 – ?
