= Matt Koehl =

American neo-Nazi (1935–2014)

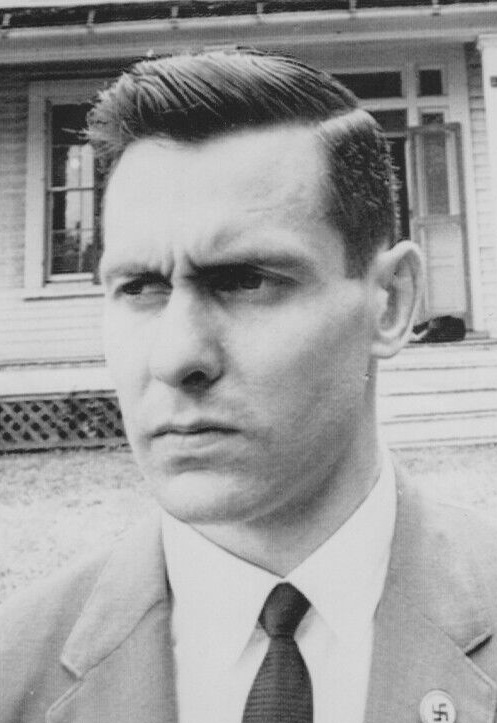
- Koehl in 1968

2nd Leader of the American Nazi Party
- In office August 25, 1967 – October 9/10, 2014
- Preceded by: George Lincoln Rockwell
- Succeeded by: Martin Kerr

Personal details
- Born: Matthias Koehl Jr. January 22, 1935 Milwaukee, Wisconsin, U.S.
- Died: October 9/10, 2014 (aged 79) Wisconsin, U.S.
- Party: American Nazi Party

Matthias Koehl Jr. (January 22, 1935 – October 9/10, 2014) was an American neo-Nazi activist and religious leader who served as the second leader of the American Nazi Party from 1967 to 2014. He joined the party in 1960 following membership in various white supremacist groups, and succeeded to leadership following the assassination of the founder of the party, George Lincoln Rockwell, in 1967.

Koehl became unpopular in the movement, alienating the party's members and attempting to consolidate power by removing his opposition from the party; often those cut off went on to form opposition groups. Koehl was very concerned with his unpopular image and made alliances with worldwide neo-fascists such as Hans-Ulrich Rudel and Povl Riis-Knudsen. Koehl cut down on the organization's previous publicity stunts under Rockwell.

In 1983, Koehl renamed the organization the New Order and transformed it into a religious organization, influenced by the fascist writer Savitri Devi. The New Order promoted occult veneration of Adolf Hitler as an avatar of God. Eventually in 1985 the group came under financial troubles and relocated from Washington DC to Wisconsin and Michigan. Koehl revealed little personal information to the group's members, who were low in number but sturdy. Koehl died in 2014, aged 79, and was succeeded by Martin Kerr.

== Early life ==
Koehl was born on January 22, 1935, in Milwaukee, Wisconsin to Hungarian immigrants of German descent. Koehl's father, Matthias Koehl Sr., claimed that his son rarely spoke with him about personal matters, but "was more talkative to his mother". At a young age, Koehl had a reputation for being vocally antisemitic. Koehl first professed admiration for Hitler at age 13 and disrupted a school lesson by defending the German dictator. He distributed racist literature at his high school and served as a spokesman for the Nazi group the American Action Army.

He graduated from a high school in his home town in 1952, and became the leader of the young guard of the National Renaissance Party. He then moved to Chicago, where he worked as an encyclopedia salesman, before he went to the University of Wisconsin–Milwaukee to study journalism. There, he played the violin alongside the civic opera. He subsequently enlisted in the United States Marine Corps and spent two years under them.

== Politics ==
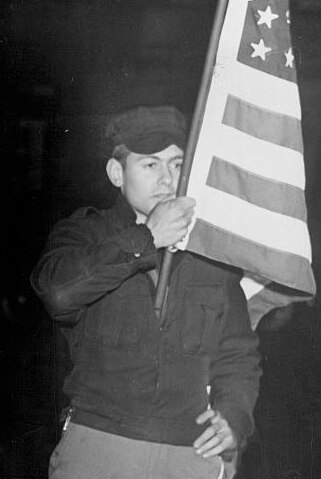
Koehl, pictured at a National Renaissance Party rally in 1953

In 1956, Koehl visited the "We the People" convention at the La Salle Hotel, where he was told by a member of the Sons of the American Revolution about George Lincoln Rockwell's plans to form a Nazi party. Koehl was initially shocked by the concept, but hoped it was legitimate.

Koehl subsequently moved between various white supremacist parties. He helped with the organization of the United White Party, and visited its founding meeting. Koehl became the national organizer of the National States' Rights Party, where he first met Rockwell in 1958; they worked on John G. Crommelin's campaign. By 1959, he was a member of the Fighting American Nationalists, a front group for Rockwell's American Nazi Party (ANP), before he joined the ANP proper in 1960. According to author Frederick J. Simonelli, Koehl and Rockwell became close friends after meeting, as Rockwell's extreme personality complimented Koehl's introverted nature. Simonelli compared this to the relationship between Adolf Hitler and Martin Bormann.

In the 1950s, Koehl was roommates with Eustace Mullins, and the two visited St. Elizabeths Hospital in order to meet poet and fascist collaborator Ezra Pound. Later, during Koehl's leadership of the ANP, Pound's poetry was reprinted in the group's journal, and he was associated with the committee to Free Ezra Pound in the 1950s.

=== With the American Nazi Party ===
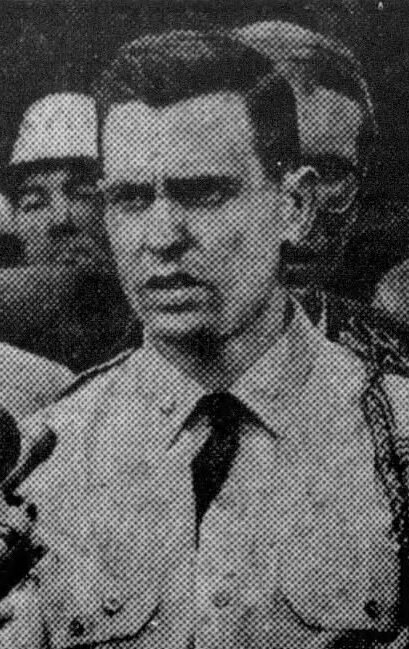
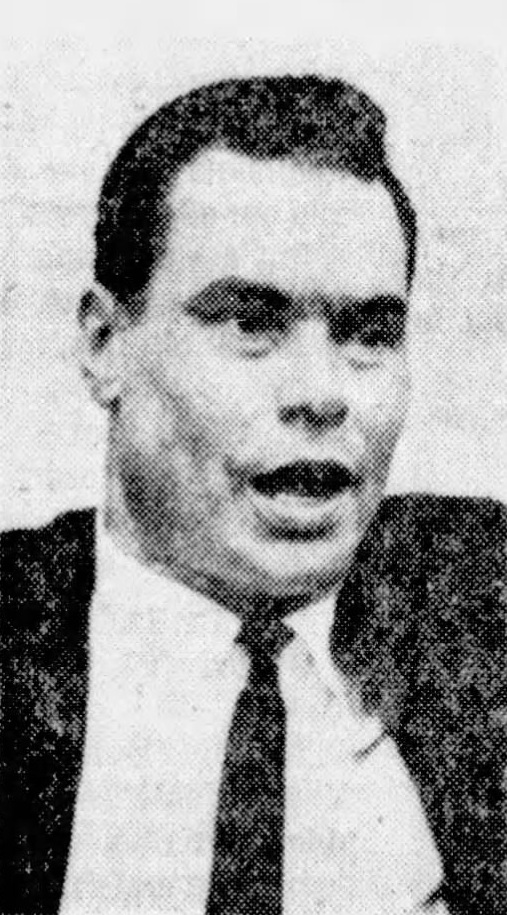
Koehl and Rockwell c. 1967

Koehl left the National States' Rights Party to become the leader of the Chicago division of the ANP in 1961, then moved to Rockwell's headquarters in 1963. This promotion of location accompanied his promotion to corresponding secretary of the World Union of National Socialists and national secretary of the ANP; in addition, he edited and published bulletins for both groups. By late 1963, he had been promoted to major and national secretary, the chief administrative officer, ending the vacancy left by James K. Warner, and by 1966, he was deputy commander in the aftermath of the resignation of Alan Welch.

One frequent rumor that plagued Koehl during his period under Rockwell was accusations that he was a homosexual. Allegations included that in 1951, when he was 16 years old, he had sexual relations with two older male members of the committee to Free Ezra Pound, or that he, alongside those two members, sexually assaulted a 15-year-old boy. Rick Cooper, leader of the National Socialist Vanguard, claimed that he found Koehl engaged in sex with a man in 1958, and James Mason spread evidence-less booklets alleging that he was gay. There was no proof of such allegations, but it deeply affected Rockwell, who attempted to "prove" Koehl's heterosexuality by trying to marry him to a Nazi woman. However, she did not appeal to Koehl, who ignored her.

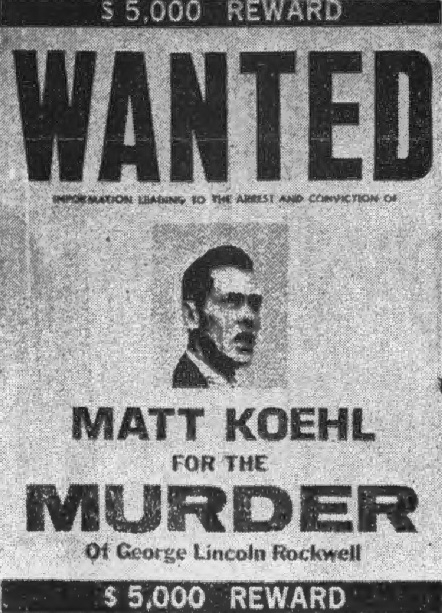
The poster spread by other neo-Nazis accusing Koehl of being responsible for Rockwell's murder

Koehl clashed with Rockwell. In August 1966, Rockwell angrily rejected a suggestion from Koehl that they should have more staff (at the time, the ANP did not have enough money for food and could not pay for new employees). On August 24, 1967, Rockwell and Koehl had another verbal dispute; an "acrimonious showdown" according to Rockwell biography Frederick Simonelli, where an eyewitness reported that Rockwell claimed Koehl would be expelled from the Party. The following day, Rockwell was assassinated. While due to the argument there was speculation Koehl may have been involved (a theory supported by various people who knew Rockwell, including his lover Barbara von Goetz), the man convicted for the assassination was a former ANP member named John Patler. Despite the conviction, dissident Nazis spread posters stating that Koehl was wanted for Rockwell's murder.

During Patler's time in the Party, he had hated Koehl for their disagreements on race; Patler, who was ethnically Greek, supported Rockwell's pan-white supremacy, while Koehl cared only for "Nordic" whites, and was uncomfortable with Patler's presence in the group. Rockwell and Patler had repeatedly argued and subsequently reconciled prior to Patler being forced out of the Party by Rockwell in March 1967. Rockwell sent Koehl to deliver the order, and Koehl brought ANP stormtroopers to search Patler's room and stop him from stealing Party property to "[add] to Patler's humiliation," according to Simonelli. At the time, Koehl claimed to newsmen the party "[didn't] know of anyone who [could] fill [Rockwell's] shoes", but Koehl was selected as leader by a group of 16 Party members and succeeded Rockwell as commander of the National Socialist White People's Party, the-at-the-time name of the American Nazi Party.

=== As party leader ===
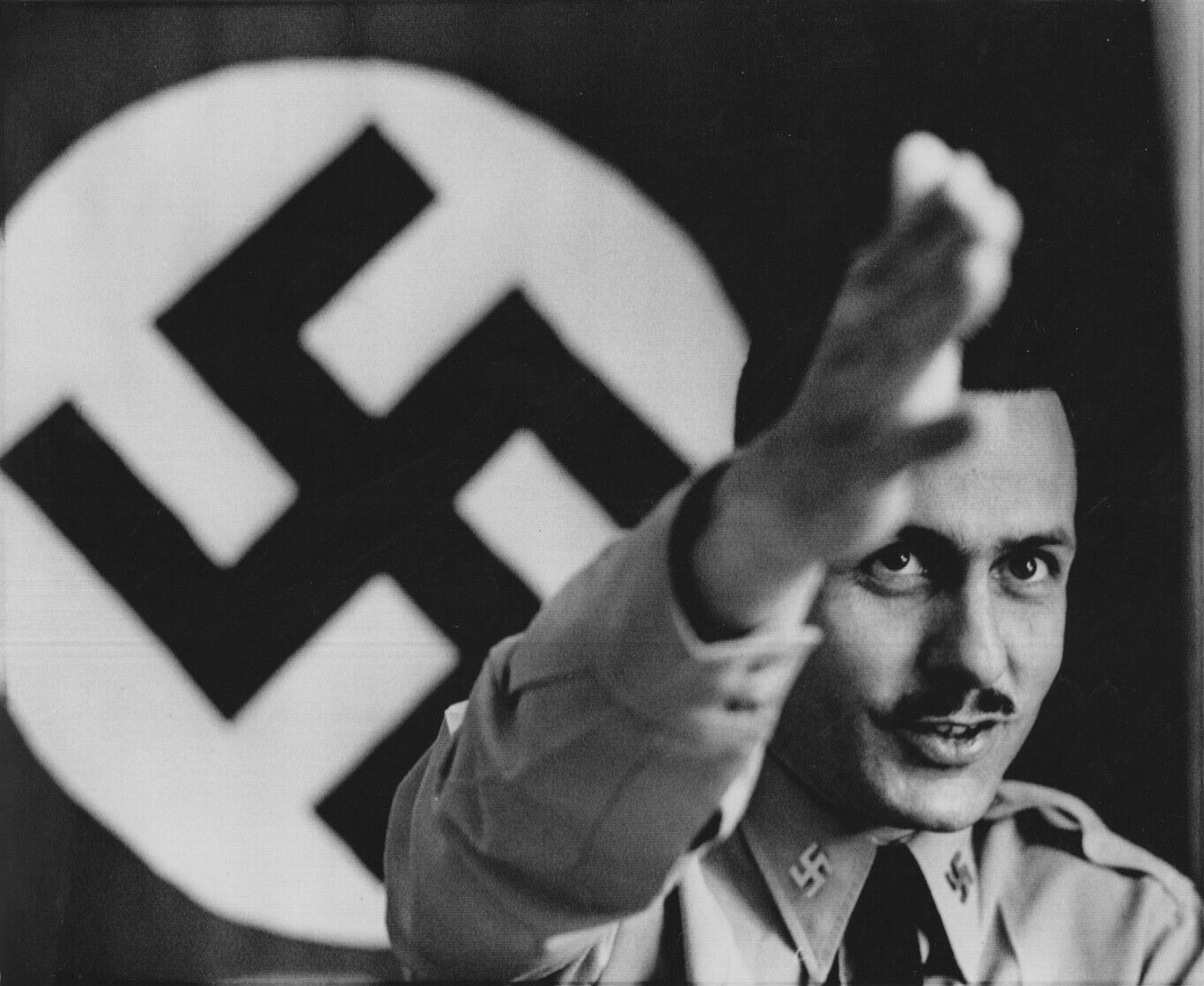
Koehl giving a speech at the party's headquarters in 1971

Immediately after Rockwell's death, groups like the American Jewish Committee believed he would be incapable of keeping the loyalty of the Nazis, believing him not as charismatic as Rockwell. This prediction proved to hold weight, as soon after achieving the position, Koehl became unpopular. His style of leadership alienated old members and made many new members leave. Shortly after Koehl gained power, two other high-ranking members of the Party, Robert Lloyd and William Luther Pierce, requested that he share power between the three of them. Koehl responded distastefully and Pierce was forced to leave the organization. Future Atomwaffen Division advisor James Mason lost faith in Koehl's leadership because of the incident, but stayed in the organization because he "didn't know what else to do". Many former members of the group were purged of their positions in Koehl's attempt to compose the Party of people completely loyal to him. He took control of the World Union of National Socialists (WUNS), and his leadership there was also criticized.

Koehl suspended Joseph Tommasi, a California-based Party member, and soon after the group's Cleveland organizer, Casey Kalemba, left; both formed their own Neo-Nazi groups outside of the ANP. An article in The Record Herald claimed he lacked the way Rockwell carried himself and commanded respect. Similarly an article in the American Jewish Year Book stated these splits were due to Koehl lacking Rockwell's leadership ability; a few units, example including the division in Los Angeles, split off from the Party rather than following him. Koehl was criticized by loyalists of Rockwell like Robert Surrey, and former members of the party, like Harold Covington, actively pushed for Koehl to be overthrown in his leadership. James Mason called him an "orthodox, cultist conservative" with "no talent" and "no charisma". Nonetheless, this lack of trust in Koehl was not universal, and the Party remained strong for years following Pierce leaving. Koehl was praised by Australian nationalist Jim Saleam as "[standing] above his contemporaries", claiming his ideas "appear to be the basis of American Nazi thinking".

In an attempt to disperse this view of him, Koehl traveled to West Germany and had his photograph taken with several former members of the original Nazi Party, publishing many of the images, chief among them one in which he shook hands with Nazi military officer Hans-Ulrich Rudel. These photographs were published alongside photos of people he had shaken hands with doing the same with Hitler, suggesting a connection between the leader of the Third Reich and Koehl. Another attempt to boost his opinion amongst extremists was his alliance with Danish Nazi leader Povl Riis-Knudsen, who became General Secretary of the WUNS.

During Koehl's leadership of the group, they backed away from their attacks on other racial groups to instead focus on "positive" aspects of the Neo-Nazi ideology. He consolidated the Party, shutting down the California and Chicago units, and largely stopped the organization from pursuing the publicity stunts they under Rockwell were known for. Instead, the message was spread primarily through prerecorded messages from Koehl sent to telephones, urging the receiver to follow the "White Power message"; one example being his request that people in Washington, D.C. disobey the gun control laws and keep at least 100 rounds for every weapon they own. One plot Koehl's party became known for during the 1980s were "Victory Bonds", a scheme mimicking War bonds where money invested would be given back once Koehl achieved power. The U.S. Securities and Exchange Commission shut down Victory Bonds after they became aware of it in a failed suit from Rick Cooper to get his money back.

=== In the New Order ===
Koehl came to believe that "all the problems [faced] in North America are fundamentally spiritual in origin", and claimed that Hitler said at the end of his life that Nazism could be revived "as a religious movement". He came to believe that the Party was inherently religious, and should stop attempting to pursue politics. Therefore, in 1983, Koehl renamed the organization the New Order and made it more overtly religious, espousing that Hitler had been sent down to Earth by a divine entity, reflecting his inspiration from fascist author Savitri Devi. He wrote in 1993 that the New Order was the only group dedicated "totally, exclusively, uncompromisingly and without reservation to the Cause of Adolf Hitler," and the front page of the New Order's website describes it as "a faith in the fullest sense of the word" and "a religion". This near-cult of Hitler was what led Povl Riis-Knudsen to become disillusioned with Koehl and his group.

By the early 1980s, the organization's membership was dwindling, and groups like the Chico Area National Socialists were still splitting off. Koehl sought out a policy, inconsistent with previous traditions, of collaborating with other organizations; a "practical demonstration of [white unity]" as he described it. However, this failed, as differences both personal and in beliefs split the groups apart. He and the Order came under heavy financial troubles in the 1980s from both the Internal Revenue Service (who had given him and his group a lien for $37,000 in unpaid taxes) and the cost of living in Washington, D.C., which culminated in him dispersing the Order to Wisconsin and Michigan in 1985. The Anti-Defamation League estimated in 1984 that the New Order had only 25 hardcore members and roughly 100 followers, and by 1997 it was considered tiny in membership and unusually stable for a hate group. Koehl stayed very secretive and followers knew little about him, but were completely trusting of him. Koehl kept himself locked in his office for most of the day then went home—members of the organization were not told what he did afterwards or the location of where he lived. Public demonstrations of the organization were rare, and never numbered more than twenty people; annual income estimates were under $100,000.

Koehl opposed the trend of White power skinheads and attacked David Duke's "repudiation of all things Nazi" during the 1991 Louisiana gubernatorial election. He missed opportunities to gain support for the New Order, and lived in obscurity from then on. By 1992, the World Union of National Socialists no longer held significant power over the movement, and was formally restructured into a policy-making group over a membership-based organization. Rockwell and British Nazi leader Colin Jordan's vision for the WUNS as a firmly structured group never came to fruition.

=== Death ===
Koehl died in the night between October 9 and 10, 2014, at the age of 79. His death was reported by the New Order in a short statement, and then by the Southern Poverty Law Center. He was succeeded as leader of the New Order by Martin Kerr.

== Ideology and beliefs ==
Koehl was an obsessive adherent to classic German Nazism and admired Adolf Hitler, being strongly antisemitic. Even from his entrance into the ANP, Koehl was interested in joining the group because of his great respect for the German Führer. While writing for National Socialist World, he depicted him as a visionary ideological thinker with more roots in White nationalism than German nationalism, and thought of Nazism as a new faith. He saw the ideology not as pushing for something political or social, but for a "universal transformation of ideas and things." Koehl was, according to Simonelli, a "rabid germanophile" who opposed the removal of the swastika from the group's image by Rockwell.

In an Associated Press interview from after he took power, Koehl claimed he had been "born a racist", opposed miscegenation, and believed in the establishment of an "all-white America". He went on to say that race war was "just around the corner." He pushed to first build up the Party within, constructing a "revolutionary cadre", and then to form a "Grassroots movement in American politics". Koehl said that he wished to "send [African-Americans] back to Africa", and that those who did not go of their own will should be forced to or killed. Years later he claimed again that "Blacks are the pawns of the Jews", and that he had nothing against Black people inherently, but thought miscegenation was a form of genocide and that White separatism was the only way to "build the White race strong again". He said in a 1976 Crawdaddy interview that it was "a mistake" for colonists to bring Africans into the United States, and elaborated on his views on Jewish people; he believed that there would be none in his ideal society, and that a potential solution was to bring them to "a big island somewhere in the middle of the Ocean" where they could "perform hard and honest work", continuing that "if it kills them… it is their tough luck".

Koehl further developed his admiration of Hitler by reforming the party into the New Order. In this group, Koehl implemented religious elements, imaging it as a faithful community. In the book Black Sun, Nicholas Goodrick-Clarke emphasizes the extents to which the organization's discussion of Hitler was religious; the New Order produced literature praising him in a manner Goodrick-Clarke considered to be imitative of Jesus, Koehl himself directly compared the cause and followers of Hitler to that of the Christian messiah in a 1991 speech to European members of the New Order, and, while talking about Rockwell after his death, compared his role within the Nazi ideology to that of St. Paul within Christianity. Koehl made claims that Hitler was "a gift of Almighty Providence" and that by rejecting him, "we rejected God himself". He claimed in 1985 that Hitler had "risen from the grave", and described him as the "greatest figure to ever walk the face of this earth." His language explicitly rejected democracy as having ruined the world, citing that the victory of the Allied powers led unfavorably to concepts he opposed such as miscegenation, rock music, Alternative lifestyles, as well as HIV/AIDS, crime and corruption.

== Works ==
- Some Guidelines to the Development of the National Socialist Movement (1969)
- The Future Calls (1972)
- The Program of the National Socialist White People's Party (Cicero, IL: NS Publications, 1980)
- Faith of the Future (1995)
