= James Mason (neo-Nazi) =

American neo-Nazi (born 1952)

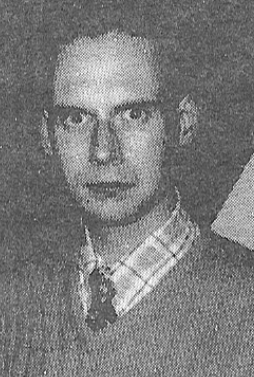
- Mason in 1976
- Born: July 25, 1952 (age 74); Chillicothe, Ohio, U.S.
- Years active: 1966–present
- Organization(s): Atomwaffen Division; Universal Order
- Notable work: Siege
- Political party: American Nazi Party (1966–c. 1970); National Socialist Liberation Front (1970s)
- Movement: Neo-Nazism

James Nolan Mason (born July 25, 1952) is an American neo-Nazi essayist and writer. Mason is the author of the newsletter and later the book, Siege, which has been influential on neo-Nazis. After growing disillusioned with the mass movement approach of neo-Nazi movements, he began advocating for a white supremacist revolution through terrorism. The newsletter Siege ran in the 1980s, with the book collecting it first published in 1992 by Michael J. Moynihan. After the publication of the book, Mason was convicted of assault and weapons charges and spent several years in prison.

After the resulting prison sentence in the 1990s, Mason fell into obscurity and spent several years writing and self-publishing books. Siege was rediscovered by the neo-Nazi forum Iron March in 2015, which resulted in a surge in popularity of the book and a rise in the influence of Mason among neo-Nazis. Mason became an ideologue and influence on the neo-Nazi terrorist group Atomwaffen Division. In 2021, Mason was one of only two individuals sanctioned by the Canadian government on its list of terror-related entities.

== Early life ==
James Nolan Mason was born July 25, 1952 in Chillicothe, Ohio, to Lawrence Nolan Mason and Eidell B. Mason (née Saunders). His father was a security guard and his mother was a nurse; they married in 1950.

Mason became interested in neo-Nazism as a young teen. After seeing news reports about George Lincoln Rockwell's American Nazi Party (ANP), he became interested in them. He became a neo-Nazi by age 14. He recalled having admiration for his black classmates in his youth for their opposition to the status quo.

One of Mason's classmates was in contact with the party and had already received their materials; he shared with Mason a copy of the book Extremism U.S.A., which contained the group's address and a picture of ANP member Allen Vincent. In 1966, when Mason was 14 years old, he mailed Vincent and joined the ANP's youth movement. He was then one of their youngest members.

== National Socialist White People's Party ==
After the assassination of Rockwell in 1967, Mason aligned himself with the National Socialist White People's Party (NSWPP; the American Nazi Party, renamed). Mason was one of the younger members of the American Nazi Party in 1966, taking inspiration from George Lincoln Rockwell's leadership.

Mason attended Chillicothe High School. He was regularly in trouble at school, in part due to chronic truancy, and was warned he might be sent to juvenile prison. In December 1968, he decided to murder several members of the school staff. He first called the leaders of the NSWPP; William Pierce suggested he instead move to Arlington, Virginia, to the party's headquarters, which he did. Mason credited Pierce's intervention with saving the lives of several. Pierce was concerned about bringing someone so young on and so refused to document Mason's involvement on paper, paying for his involvement himself. Mason dropped out of high school but had obtained a GED by the age of 26.

On his 18th birthday, Mason was sworn in as a full member of the party by Matt Koehl, who succeeded Rockwell as leader following his assassination. Mason then returned to Ohio. When Pierce was removed from the party in 1970 in a dispute with its leader Matt Koehl, Mason lost his faith in the party, and said he only stayed because he "didn’t know what else to do." In July 1974, Mason accompanied Koehl on an interview during his visit to their local branch of the NSWPP.

== First imprisonment and the National Socialist Movement ==
On October 3, 1973, aged 21 and while still a member of the NSWPP, Mason was arrested and charged for spraying a 14-year-old black girl in the face with mace. He was convicted of assault on November 2 and sentenced to a $200 fine and six months of work in the Cincinnati Work House, the maximum sentence for the crime. He was freed on bond by his parents. An accomplice, Greg Hurles, also an NSWPP member, was also convicted.

After several failed appeals, including to the state supreme court, Mason began serving his workhouse sentence in October 1974. Shortly before entering prison, he was exposed by fellow neo-Nazi Robert Brennan to the magazine Siege, written by National Socialist Liberation Front leader Joseph Tommasi. Mason became fascinated by Tommasi's revolutionary ideology, and while in prison, immersed himself in it completely. He spent the months in jail planning a "fresh revolutionary type of national socialism". Mason was released from the work house on March 8, 1975. Mason, Hurles, and Brennan then immediately created a group called the National Socialist Movement. Mason chose the "most generic and the least pretentious label possible", and chose the word 'movement' in order to "avoid the term party at all costs". Brennan had been expelled from the NSWPP both locally and nationwide the previous year. The group was based heavily off of Tommasi's ideology, and became heavily intertwined in organizational structure with the NSLF. Mason started writing Tommasi, but exchanged just a few letters with him before he was murdered.

Mason resigned from the NSWPP in October 1976, after he had formed the NSM. His NSM then produced a booklet that baselessly accused Koehl of being gay. As a member of the NSM, in 1977, he rallied to support Larry Flynt, the publisher of the porn magazine Hustler, who was then facing obscenity charges; he said that "without a free press I'd be out of business". In 1975, longtime NSWPP member Allen Vincent split from Koehl, and formed his own group. He called his group the "National Socialist White Worker's Party"; Mason soon affiliated with him and by 1977 his party and Vincent's party were intertwined. Mason edited the group's magazine, Stormer. In 1979, a Jewish group mailed him a bomb, part of a wider campaign targeting Nazi sympathizers in Ohio.

== Universal Order and Siege ==
Logo of the Universal Order

Mason's writings are considered influential among radical right-wing and neo-Nazi movements. In 1980, Mason revived Siege, the newsletter of the NSLF. He continued publishing until 1986. In the newsletter, Mason paid tribute to Adolf Hitler, Joseph Tommasi, Charles Manson, and Savitri Devi. It was later edited into a book. In 1980, he declared his support for neo-Nazi serial killer Joseph Paul Franklin, a former member of the NSWPP, who he claimed to have known personally.

In the early 1980s, Mason began corresponding with Sandra Good and Lynette Fromme, two followers of Charles Manson. In 1982, along with Manson, Mason founded Universal Order, an organization that encouraged terror with notoriety, similar to that achieved by the Manson Family.

In this correspondence with Manson's associates, Mason began to venerate the work of Charles Manson. This obsession was inspired by "the Manson Family's attempt to start a race war which they would wait out in the desert; their leader's racism, antisemitism, and female following; and his popularity among rebellious young people, whom Mason hoped to recruit." Manson also designed the logo of the Universal Order. Mason's turn to Charles Manson worship resulted in criticism from many other neo-Nazis. Even the other neo-Nazis who kept in contact with Mason, like Pierce and Tom Metzger, were put off by it. When Siege ended, Metzger was distressed, and suggested that Mason began writing for Metzger's paper, WAR, the outlet of his White Aryan Resistance organization. Mason did so; he published a few articles a year in the paper, and was one of its editorial staff.

However, the Manson worship also led to new attention in the late 1980s, but now outside of the neo-Nazi subculture. In February 1987, he was interviewed by Brian King and Ken Swezey, which was later excerpted in the documentary Charles Manson Superstar. Mason's posters were included in Adam Parfrey and George Petros's Exit magazine, and he contributed to its sixth issue; he was thanked in Parfrey's 1988 book Apocalypse Culture. That same year, Mason's work got its first reprinting in the book The Manson File, which had a section on Mason. In 1991, Mason appeared with Michael J. Moynihan and Boyd Rice on the Christian radio show Talk-Back. He was affiliated with the Abraxas Foundation for several years.

With the ending of the Siege newsletter, Moynihan encouraged Mason to create an anthology of sorts that included his earlier works. After years of struggling to find someone who would publish the book, Moynihan formed the Storm Books imprint (created solely to publish Siege), and published it in 1992, entitled Siege: The Collected Writings of James Mason. Siege explicitly advocated lone wolf terrorism, as opposed to group terrorism, and adheres to what it describes as terroristic National Socialism; Mason describes Hitler as "the greatest personality in all of history" and "the LAST CHANCE for the revival of Western Civilization".

=== 1990s imprisonment ===
In 1988 and 1991 his home was raided, and he was arrested for "illegal use of a minor in nudity-oriented material", for which he was sentenced to a $500 fine and a suspended sentence. In May 1994, Mason was arrested and charged with two counts of sexual exploitation of a minor and two counts of contributing to the delinquency of a minor. His relationship with the 15-year-old girl began after his book release in 1993. He was connected to this girl in December 1993, having met her father through his neo-Nazi affiliations in 1977. He chronicled the dispute with the girl in neo-Nazi periodicals that he wrote for. This and his devotion to Charles Manson did not help Mason's reputation with other contemporary neo-Nazis, who thought him immoral. The relationship ended with Mason's arrest in March 1994. He then threatened his ex-girlfriend, who was then 16 years old, and a Latino man whom she had been dating, with a firearm. Initially, the case against him was more severe but after several turns in the case – Mason was found to have a less substantial child porn collection than was initially reported and the victim sued the lead investigator in the case for sexual harassment (claiming that she had also been abused by him throughout the whole case) – Mason struck a plea bargain and was convicted of weapons charges alone.

While in prison, his neo-Nazi writings continued, then centering on what can be described as "racist UFO-Christian spiritual beliefs" until 2004. Mason was published by the Resistance in spring of 1995 while in prison. While he was imprisoned, his output in WAR picked up substantially, writing dozens more articles. He also wrote a controversial article for the white supremacist music magazine Resistance in 1995, "Charles Manson: Illusion vs. Reality?", where he advocated Manson as a leader for the white supremacist cause. This article was very controversial among readers of the periodical, and in the next issue they issued a debate article on Manson.

One of Mason's supporters ultimately created a website Universal Order to consolidate his writings and display them on the internet in 1997. Mason recounted his time in prison as follows: "Basically I had a good time because the Colorado prison system is one of the most advanced in the country. You can meet quite a few interesting people." He was released from prison in 1997, only to be returned to prison in 1999. He was free by 2000.

=== After release ===
After his release from prison, Mason entered a period of obscurity except to insiders in the neo-Nazi movement; he mostly spent the next decade writing and self-publishing books, while working as head of security at several Kmart locations. He was involved in a few white supremacist records; he was featured on an album from the white power band Ethnic Cleansing, and wrote the liner notes for a rerelease of a George Lincoln Rockwell speech and an album from the band Mudoven.

With his release in 2000, Mason self-published the several books he had written in prison, publishing One Verse Charlies, The Robert Burns Collection (Volume 1), The Theocrat, When We Were All Jews, and Revisiting Revelation that year. When We Were Jews was co-illustrated by Nick Bougas. Also that year, he contributed two entries to the Encyclopedia of White Power, a publication edited by scholar Jeffrey Kaplan. His two chapters were on the NSLF, and one on the Universal Order. His chapters were some of a few entries written by far-righters, with most written by Kaplan; Kaplan approached contributors with the requirement that the authors do so in an unbiased manner. In a review of that book, scholar Kathleen M. Blee said while some of the far-righters' contributions were informative, Mason's were "self-aggrandizing". The book contains an entry on Mason himself, written by Kaplan.

Siege was republished and spread online in the 2000s. Mason published the second volume of his Robert Burns collection in 2002, and an anthology of his articles for WAR in 2003, and Articles and Interviews, an assortment of articles and interviews involving or about him. A second edition of Siege was released in 2003 by Ryan Schuster's Black Sun Publications. He also finished a manuscript on his time in prison, entitled Out of the Dust, though this was not published for over a decade. He continued to put out new books and new editions of his old books until about 2010. He also made several CDs of old American Nazi Party material.

== Rediscovery ==
Mason's Siege was rediscovered by the neo-Nazi forum Iron March in 2015. The forum popularized the book among neo-Nazis, and with this came celebrity for Mason among this demographic.

=== Atomwaffen Division ===
Mason's writings in Siege have been credited with forming a large part of the Atomwaffen Division's ideological foundation. Mason is an ideologue for the group. In an interview with Frontline, Mason claimed he was approached by members of Atomwaffen who wished to recruit him as an ideological advisor, to which he obliged. He asserted that he had no role in orchestrating plots connected to the group, but simultaneously refused to condemn attacks linked to them. Mason would later mention in a separate interview with MSNBC that members have often disclosed to him their intentions to commit acts of violence, including Sam Woodward, who was later charged with the murder of Blaze Bernstein.

As of 2019 Mason was reportedly living in government housing and spotted eating at soup kitchens in the Denver, Colorado area. On being questioned about his involvement with Atomwaffen-related murders by a KUSA reporter, Mason responded by saying: "If they were acting on my words they wouldn't be doing the things they're doing. Throwing their lives away. ... I say don't do it but if you're going to do it, for god's sake do it right." He expressed that the election of Donald Trump gave him hope, commenting that "in order to Make America Great Again, you have to make it White again". James Mason adheres to Christian Identity and is an ordained CI minister.

On March 14, 2020, Mason claimed that the Atomwaffen Division had disbanded. However, the group was believed to be on the cusp of being designated a Foreign Terrorist Organization by the State Department, and the Anti-Defamation League concluded "the move is designed to give members breathing room rather than actually end their militant activities". The members remained active and in August 2020 they announced having reorganizing as the National Socialist Order on the American Futurist.

Mason has also been known to receive foreign admirers in his Denver home, including members of the Nordic Resistance Movement, a proscribed Finnish terrorist organization, and the affiliated neo-Nazi music collective Bolt of Ukko. On June 25, 2021, Mason was added to the entities designated as terrorist by Canada. Mason is only the second individual to be specifically added to the list.

== Bibliography ==
- —— (1992). Siege: The Collected Writings of James Mason (1st ed.). Denver: Storm Books.
  - —— (2003). Siege (2nd ed.). Bozeman: Black Sun Publications. ISBN 0-9724408-0-1.
- —— (2000). One Verse Charlies. Self-published.
- —— (2000). The Robert Burns Collection. Vol. 1. Self-published.
- —— (2000). The Theocrat. Self-published.
- —— (April 2000). When We Were All Jews. Art and graphics by D. M. Worley and Nick Bougas. Denver: Self-published.
- —— (2002). The Robert Burns Collection. Vol. 2. Self-published.
- —— (2003). Articles of WAR. Self-published.
- —— (2003). Articles and Interviews. Self-published.
- —— (2005). Race, Religion and Politics. Self-published.
- —— (2005). The Lost Cause. Self-published.
- —— (2005). Horror: Desensitization, Conditioned Reflexes, and Thought Control. Self-published.
- —— (2009). Tyranny of Freedom. Self-published.
- —— (2009). Harvest of Conspiracy: 1900-2000. Self-published.
- —— (2022). Out of the Dust. Self-published. Written in 2003.
- ——; Snyder, V.S. (2022). National Socialist Liberation Front. Self-published.
