= Spencer Sunshine =

American writer and activist

- Citizenship: United States

Academic background
- Education: PhD (City University of New York)
- Thesis: Post-1960 U.S. anarchism and social theory
- Doctoral advisor: Stanley Aronowitz
- Other advisor: Clarence Taylor

Academic work
- Notable works: Neo-Nazi Terrorism and Countercultural Fascism
- Website: spencersunshine.com

Spencer Sunshine is an American independent scholar and political analyst, primarily known for his writings on right-wing extremism. He was an associate fellow at Political Research Associates from 2013 to 2019. In 2024 he published a positively-reviewed academic book on the history and reception of the neo-Nazi book Siege.

== Life and work ==
Sunshine grew up in rural Georgia in the 1970s and 1980s, where he was threatened for having a Jewish father. In the late 1980s he began participating in the punk rock scene, where he became involved in anarchist politics.

He earned a doctorate in sociology from the City University of New York, writing his dissertation on post-1960s American anarchism under the direction of Stanley Aronowitz. He was an associate fellow at Political Research Associates from 2013 to 2019. He describes himself as a libertarian socialist and anti-fascist activist. Sunshine has received death threats due to his work. He co-organized a YIVO conference on Yiddish Anarchism in 2019. After the January 6 United States Capitol attack he was the subject of a right-wing conspiracy theory tying him to the QAnon Shaman.

=== Research on Siege ===
Sunshine's book Neo-Nazi Terrorism and Countercultural Fascism: The Origins and Afterlife of James Mason's Siege was published by Routledge in 2024. He describes it as written from "an antifascist perspective". It was researched using Mason's archival letters and periodicals from a collection at the University of Kansas. It discusses the origins and reception of Mason's book Siege, which has inspired several terrorist groups and attacks.

The book is divided into two parts: a history of American neo-Nazism in the 1960s and 1970s, followed by an exploration of Mason's countercultural music and publishing connections (centered on Adam Parfrey, Boyd Rice, and Michael J. Moynihan), which Sunshine calls the "Abraxas Clique". There is also an appendix that discusses the individuals who were influenced by the book. It was well-reviewed. John P. Hendry praised it as meticulously researched and said there was "no finer resource for scholars of the contemporary neo-Nazi movement". He noted its structure as unusual and said it felt like three books in one; Hendry wrote that this could feel disconcerting but was minimized by the chapters being effectively self-contained. Writing in the Los Angeles Review of Books, Jordan S. Carroll called it "a brilliant account of the contemporary Far Right's evolution".

== Selected bibliography ==
- Co-editor with Pam Chamberlain, Matthew. Lyons, Abby Scher Spencer Sunshine, Exposing the Right and Fighting for Democracy: Celebrating Chip Berlet as Journalist and Scholar, eds. Routledge, 2022.
- Unorthodox Fascism (2019)
- —— (2024). Neo-Nazi Terrorism and Countercultural Fascism: The Origins and Afterlife of James Mason's Siege. Routledge Studies in Fascism and the Far Right. New York: Routledge. ISBN 978-0-367-19055-2.
