= American Nazi Party =

Neo-Nazi group in the United States

- Abbreviation: ANP (1959–1967); NSWPP (1967–1983)
- Leader: Martin Kerr
- Founder: George Lincoln Rockwell
- Founded: October 1959; 67 years ago
- Headquarters: (Rockwell's headquarters); 928 North Randolph Street, Arlington, Virginia, U.S.
- Newspaper: The Stormtrooper (1962–1968)
- Youth wing: NSLF (1969–1974)
- Membership: 500 (c. 1967)
- Ideology: Neo-Nazism
- Political position: Far-right
- International affiliation: World Union of National Socialists

Party flag
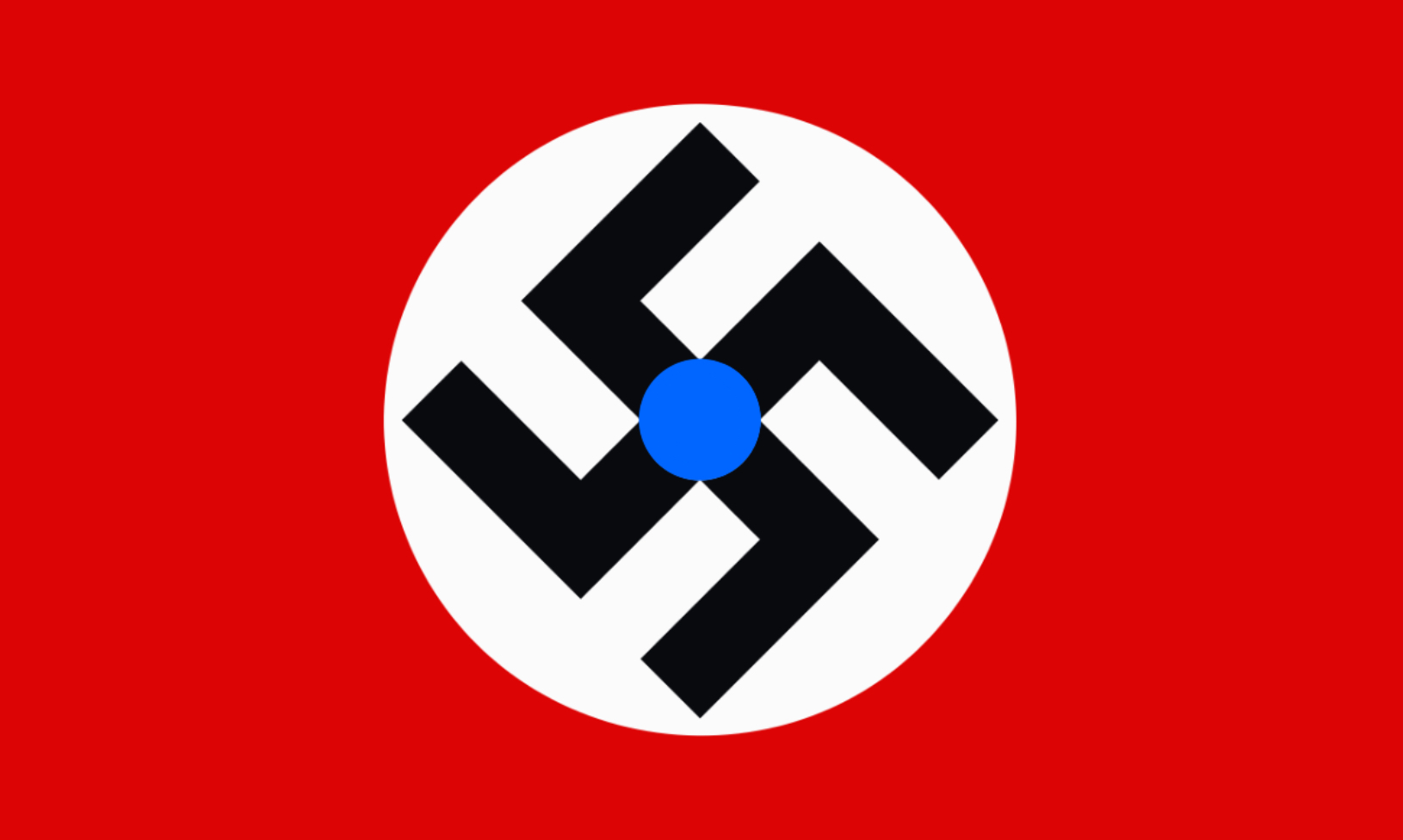

Website
- www.theneworder.org

The American Nazi Party (ANP) is an American neo-Nazi organization founded by George Lincoln Rockwell in 1959. In Rockwell's time, it was headquartered in Arlington, Virginia. It was renamed the National Socialist White People's Party (NSWPP) in 1967. Rockwell was assassinated by former ANP member John Patler later that year. Following Rockwell's assassination, the organization appointed his second in command, Deputy Commander Matt Koehl, as the new leader.

The NSWPP, while under Koehl's command, was subject to ideological disagreements between members in the 1970s and 1980s, leading to several members being kicked out and forming their own groups. Koehl renamed the NSWPP the New Order in 1983, which came with a shift in the organization towards esoteric neo-Nazism. After Koehl's death in 2014, a long-time member and officer of the New Order, Martin Kerr, assumed leadership.

== History ==
=== Background and founding ===
The American Nazi Party was founded in October 1959 by George Lincoln Rockwell, a commercial artist, publisher, and commander in the United States Navy. Rockwell had become radicalized into National Socialism (Nazism) after an initial contact with antisemitic anti-communist figures, and became a neo-Nazi after reading Adolf Hitler's autobiography Mein Kampf in 1950.

After this experience, Rockwell spent several years organizing extreme right-wing political groups; he initially tried to do this in a socially acceptable fashion, but came to see this as a failure as it did not attract an extreme enough audience. He eventually decided to go public with his antisemitism, and made more extreme and explicit political efforts. When Rockwell's supporters were implicated in the Hebrew Benevolent Congregation Temple bombing in 1958, it caused a backlash against him, and Rockwell's wife and family cut ties with him. Now miserable, Rockwell had a Nazi "religious experience" and committed to overt, explicit advocacy of Nazism. In October 1959, Rockwell founded the American Nazi Party. Its headquarters were established at 928 North Randolph Street in Arlington, which also became Rockwell's home, and a nearby farmhouse served as a barracks for its members.

=== Activities ===
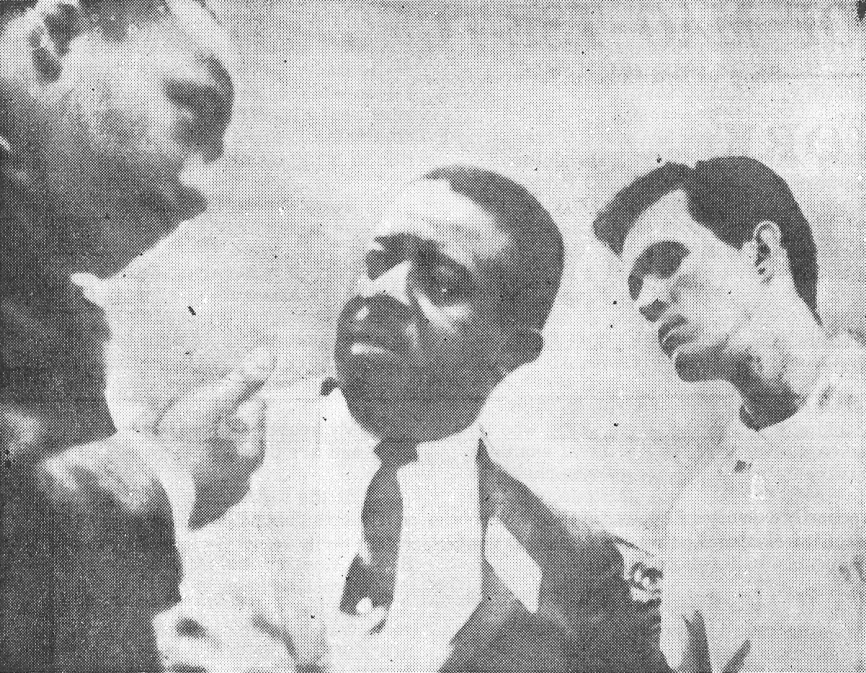
Martin Luther King Jr. (left) gesturing at Roy James (right) after James punched him in the face; in the center, breaking them up, is Ralph Abernathy

Under Rockwell, the party explicitly embraced Nazi uniforms and iconography, and embarked on high profile media stunts designed to gain the maximum amount of press coverage. The group itself was quite fringe and had few members in comparison with the very large amount of publicity it garnered. Members regularly protested and caused disruptions.

The Virginia House of Delegates revoked the ANP's corporation charter in June 1962 and banned the use of the name "Nazi" or "National Socialist" in charter names. A new charter was submitted under the name of ANP, Inc., which was rejected on a technicality. It was recreated under the name the George Lincoln Rockwell Party with only a single change on the board of directors.

In September 1962, ANP member Roy James punched Martin Luther King Jr. twice while King was speaking at a convention. King did not defend himself and instead spoke to him. James expressed regret and apologized shortly after the attack, but later went back on it and said he did not regret it. James was convicted of assault, battery, and disorderly conduct, and in October was sentenced to 30 days in jail and fined $25 (equal to $266.09 today). In September 1962, Rockwell awarded James a medal for the deed.

Rockwell's money habits and usage of the ANP's funding resulted in regular problems for the party and rough conditions for its members. Many became dissatisfied with his leadership. The second highest ranking member, Karl Allen, left the ANP in December, claiming it was for personal reasons. This surprised Rockwell, and he was disturbed to lose the best educated member of the group and second in command. Many party members left and followed Allen, and drew up a list of grievances against Rockwell and his leadership tactics, particularly an inability to "refrain from inserting his personality and judgment into every minute part of the Party's operation". They enumerated a list of grievances to be addressed and changes in the party's operations if they were to rejoin. Rockwell refused to address the demands. He was most worried about a demand that he would no longer have sole discretion over the board of directors, which he worried would be used to take control of the party. From then on declared them to be "the mutiny" and kept them out of the ANP.

During the 1960s, the FBI's COINTELPRO "White Hate" program placed the ANP under surveillance and undertook operations aimed at discrediting and disrupting its activities as part of a broader targeting of white supremacist and extremist groups. In 1962, then-attorney general Robert F. Kennedy declared he would not seek to have the ANP designated a subversive organization, saying that, due to the hearings required for such a process, it would only give Rockwell a platform to spread his "obnoxious doctrines".

In November 1963, when King was set to speak in Danville, Virginia, to set up a dialogue with whites, Rockwell sent ANP member Karl Allen and another member to instigate against him. He initially planned to have Allen stay there for some time to harass King, but this plan was derailed by the Kennedy assassination. After the Kennedy assassination, Americans turned against many extremist movements, and Rockwell and the party were largely silent for a time.

After several years of living in impoverished conditions, Rockwell began to experience some financial success with paid speaking engagements at universities where he was invited to express his controversial views as exercises in free speech. This prompted him to end the rancorous "Phase One" party tactics and begin "Phase Two", a plan to recast the group as a legitimate political party by toning down the verbal and written attacks against non-whites, replacing the party rallying cry of "Sieg Heil!" with "White Power!", limiting public display of the swastika, and entering candidates in local elections.

In 1965, the ANP was involved in a scandal in California involving the Young Republicans (YNRF) organization; George King Jr. and Ray Drake, who had been elected president and corresponding secretary, respectively, of the Long Beach, California chapter of the YR, were discovered to have an affiliation with far-right groups, but particularly the ANP. This affiliation was revealed when Steven Dale Ahern, who claimed to be a former member of the ANP, testified that there was a plan by Ralph Perry Forbes, the head of the California ANP, to seize control of several California Young Republicans branches. He claimed that both Drake and King, both members of the ANP, had been elected based on funds and on Forbes's order. Forbes denied this and said that Ahern was untrustworthy, and that Ahern had never been in the ANP. Drake admitted he had supported the ANP ideologically, had attended many of their meetings, and marched with them in Nazi uniform, but denied being a member officially. This resulted in internal debate, and widespread criticism from Republican politicians in the state; concerned about an infiltration of the YNRF by the ANP, King and Drake were investigated by the board of directors of the state-level California Young Republicans organization. It was debated whether the entire Long Beach chapter be ousted, and ultimately King and Drake were ousted from the YNRF. Senator Barry Goldwater praised the YRNF for expelling the pair.

The years 1965 and 1967 were possibly the height of Rockwell's profile. In December 1965, the ANP experienced a significant financial setback when the Internal Revenue Service (IRS) attempted to foreclose their headquarters due to alleged nonpayment of nearly $3,500 in taxes in a three year period; the IRS also seized many of their printing equipment, as well as many of their Nazi materials, threatening to auction it off to satisfy the tax lien. Senator Clifford P. Case pointed out that this would make the IRS purveyors of Nazi material. The IRS considered that selling Nazi materials made them worse off, and returned many of the Nazi and other materials to the ANP, only selling off their office equipment. Rockwell afterwards paid it off (calling it "extortion") in installments.

Rockwell was interviewed by Alex Haley in Playboy magazine in April 1966, an event that stirred controversy within the ranks. At the time Rockwell had about 500 followers.

=== Name change and assassination of Rockwell ===
On January 1, 1967, the group underwent several changes. Rockwell changed the name of the American Nazi Party to the National Socialist White People's Party (NSWPP), changed the logo to a stylized eagle, and replaced their slogan of Sieg Heil with White Power, all in an effort to Americanize the organization and increase its appeal. This alienated some hard-line members. The new name was a "conscious imitation" of the National Association for the Advancement of Colored People. Rockwell wanted a more "ecumenical" approach and felt that the swastika banner was impeding organizational growth. Rockwell was killed before he could implement party reforms.

On August 25, 1967, as Rockwell left a laundromat, John Patler, a former follower, shot Rockwell from the roof of the building. One bullet missed, and the other hit his chest and ruptured his heart. He was pronounced dead at the scene.

=== Koehl's succession and ideological divisions ===
Rockwell's second in command, Deputy Commander Matt Koehl, a staunch Hitlerist, assumed the leadership role after a council agreed that he should retain command. In 1968, Koehl moved the party to a new headquarters on 2507 North Franklin Road, clearly visible from Arlington's main thoroughfare, Wilson Boulevard. In 1969, NSWPP William Luther Pierce and Joseph Tommasi founded the National Socialist Liberation Front (NSLF) as a youth wing of the American Nazi Party, aiming for it to appeal to White college students. In 1970, David Duke joined the NSLF youth wing (through mail order).

Koehl's leadership style resulted in many members leaving the group or being kicked out. The party began to experience ideological divisions among its followers as it entered the 1970s. Thereafter, the members engaged in internecine disputes, and they were either expelled by Koehl or they resigned. After the murder of Rockwell, the party dissipated and ad hoc organizations usurped the American Nazi Party logo. Those included James Burford in Chicago and John Bishop in Iowa. Some members of the NSWPP chose to support William Luther Pierce, who was kicked out by Koehl, and formed the National Alliance in 1974. Others went with Joseph Tommasi, who was abruptly kicked out of the group for unclear reasons by Koehl in 1973. Tommasi founded the National Socialist Liberation Front in 1974, using the same name as the NSWPP's youth wing, but in effect an entirely new group. The new NSLF was a highly militant splinter of the NSWPP that attracted its most radical members; members were linked to several violent attacks.

In 1975, members of the California NSWPP were the subject of the academy award nominee documentary film The California Reich.

In 1982 the Internal Revenue Service took action to foreclose on the group's headquarters in Arlington, Virginia. The site of the party headquarters, 928 North Randolph Street in Ballston, Virginia, is now a hotel and office building. After Rockwell's death, his successor Matt Koehl relocated the headquarters to 2507 North Franklin Road in Clarendon, Arlington, Virginia. The small building, often misidentified today as Rockwell's former headquarters became The Java Shack.

=== New Order ===
Koehl's NSWPP changed its name to New Order on January 1, 1983, on the grounds that the people in the area "are not people looking to join revolutionary organizations", saying that it was moving to an area in the Midwest which it would not reveal for security reasons. This was announced by Martin Kerr, the leader at the Franklin Road headquarters. Due to recruitment issues along with financial and legal trouble, Koehl was forced to relocate the group's headquarters from the DC area, eventually finding his way to scattered locations in Wisconsin and Michigan. The name change reflected the group's neo-Nazi mysticism and it was still known by that name in 2010.

The organization briefly attracted the media's attention in October 1983, when it held a private meeting at Yorktown High School in Arlington, Virginia. New Order's Chief of Staff, Martin Kerr, claims that the group is no longer a white supremacist group and focuses on advocating "in favor of [white] people, not against other races or ethnicities...we consider the white people of the world to be a gigantic family of racial brothers and sisters, united by ties of common ancestry and common heritage. Being for our own family does not mean that we hate other families." The SPLC still classifies them as neo-Nazis and as a "hate group".

After Koehl's death in 2014, Kerr assumed leadership and maintains the New Order website and organization.

== Organization ==
The ANP published several periodicals, run on a subscription, which it used to connect with the party's various sympathizers. The sympathizers sometimes became members or followers of the group. Its first periodical, the National Socialist Bulletin, was founded in May 1960; it was a small periodical, 15 pages long for each issue. It published eight issues, before it was succeeded by The Stormtrooper Magazine. They also ran The Rockwell Report, starting in 1961; the Report, unlike the Bulletin, was a full-size magazine, published irregularly. It also published the National Socialist World magazine, which presented itself in a pseudo-scholarly style. Members paid membership dues of $5; failure to pay meant expulsion.

The American Nazi Party's flag was a standard Nazi flag with a small blue dot in the center, supposed to represent a globe, which it was in some iterations. An ANP storm trooper meeting with journalist George Thayer explained that this blue dot was supposed to be representative of the United Nations being consumed by Nazism. In a 1967 issue of the ANP's Stormtrooper Magazine, the party stated the blue dot was added to symbolize internationalism and non-German white races, in which they differed from the original Nazis, to "represent the world and all the White People who live in the world". After Rockwell was assassinated, the blue dot was removed from the party's flag and they began using a standard Nazi flag; an internal memo reproduced by James K. Warner in his 1968 "open letter" declared that the "pure Aryan Swastika of our ancestors is to be used unblemished."

Rockwell and some party members established a "Stormtrooper Barracks" in an old mansion owned by the widow of Willis Kern in the Dominion Hills section of Arlington at what is now the Upton Hill Regional Park. After Rockwell's murder, the headquarters was moved again to one side of a duplex brick and concrete storefront at 2507 North Franklin Road which featured a swastika prominently mounted above the front door. This site was visible from busy Wilson Boulevard. Today, the Franklin Road address is often misidentified as Rockwell's headquarters when in fact it was the successor organization's last physical address in Arlington (now a coffeehouse).

== Regional units ==
The ANP also had three other chapters in cities outside of the main organization in Arlington: in Los Angeles, Chicago, and Dallas.

=== Western Division ===
In 1962, Rockwell established the Western Division, also called the Western Division—ANP, as the California or West Coast branch of the ANP. Relative to even the rest of the ANP, it was known as especially fractious, with it being plagued by numerous schisms and leadership disputes. At least half of all members of this division had either felony arrests or had been institutionalized for mental health reasons.

Rockwell made serious efforts to organize the division for two years. It was initially led by Leonard Holstein. However, in 1963 Holstein was jailed after a riot involving several party members and a group of Jews. Rockwell then replaced Holstein with Ralph Perry Forbes in May 1963. The Western Division relocated to Glendale, California in late 1964 and afterwards Forbes and other ANP members became involved in a dispute with the city. The Glendale authorities attempted to evict them and the city refused to turn on the electricity unless Forbes signed an affidavit promising to not use the house for Nazi activities, which Forbes refused. Forbes said that his lease allowed him to use the property for political purposes, which the homeowner had thought was the Republican or Democratic political parties, not the Nazi Party. The city then filed a complaint against Forbes for "operating a meeting hall in a single-family dwelling without a permit"; this dispute eventually escalated to also involve Los Angeles County. His eviction was stayed later that year and he was allowed to live in his home until the expiration of the lease; his landlord was instead ordered to pay for his eviction proceedings. In 1966, the Western Division moved to El Monte, California after the rent on their headquarters increased four times over.

In late 1968, the conflict between the secular stance of the ANP and Forbes's beliefs (Forbes was a Christian Identity adherent) came to the forefront, with his legitimacy as a leader now in question without Rockwell. Members Allen Vincent and James K. Warner led a schism within the Western Division, and Rockwell's successor Matt Koehl had to travel to California to mediate it. Koehl decided Forbes should be the legitimate leader; in response, members rebelled. This resulted in numerous schisms from the Western Division. Later that year, Forbes was ousted by the Western Division and later left the ANP. Forbes was eventually succeeded by Joseph Tommasi, who was also ousted from the group and founded his own schism party, the NSLF. After his murder, the Western Division exited El Monte. They planned to move out of El Monte and to Pasadena, but there is no evidence they did so.

=== Chicago unit ===
The Chicago unit of the ANP was established in 1962. It was founded out of what had started as an ANP front organization, established in 1960, the Fighting American Nationalists (FAN). FAN also had branches in other states.

By 1962, the Chicago FAN unit, which was the largest, turned into simply another branch of the ANP. They owned a small bookstore called the Vineland Bookstore and were headquartered in a two-story brick building. Its first leader was Eugene "Mal" Lambert and Matt Koehl, before Koehl was transferred to the main Arlington faction in February 1963. That year, they lost their headquarters on account of building code violations. They opened another in December 1964. This unit had the only woman to have a position of power in the group, Erika Himmler. Chris Vidnjevich was in charge by 1965.

The Chicago unit was a target of a two-part plot by COINTELPRO in 1965, attempting to disrupt their leadership and destroy them financially. They recruited a member of the Anti-Defamation League to enact this plan, and the FBI sent fake letters to local Jewish organizations in an attempt to get the city to take action against them. During the ANP's high profile 1966 White power protests in Chicago, possibly the height of the ANP's success, Vidnjevich and the Chicago ANP were heavily involved. After Rockwell died, the unit was shut down during Koehl's leadership.

=== Dallas unit ===
The Dallas unit of the ANP was established in November 1964. It was primarily led by Robert Surrey (aka Max Amann), a former member of the John Birch Society, and his wife, Mary Surrey. Robert Surrey was a major patron of the party. This one was structured differently than the others, split into a "social group", led by the Surreys and a stormtrooper group led by Jerald Walraven. This was done in order to protect the reputations of those wealthy supporters in the social group who paid for the stormtroopers. The social group met with the Surreys and the Stormtrooper outfit instead met at a different Dallas headquarters. The Dallas unit participated in Rockwell's agitation campaigns, and anti-racial integration demonstrations. After Rockwell's death, Robert Surrey left the party and wrote a memorandum denouncing Koehl.

== Namesake organizations ==
Since the late 1960s, there have been a number of small unrelated groups that have used the name "American Nazi Party".

- Perhaps the first was led by James Warner and Allen Vincent and it consisted of members of the California branch of the NSWPP. This group announced its existence on January 1, 1968. In 1982 James Burford formed another "American Nazi Party" from disaffected branches of the National Socialist Party of America. This Chicago-based group remained in existence until at least 1994.
- A small American Nazi Party, operating out of Davenport, Iowa, under the leadership of John Robert Bishop, maintained a presence until its eventual decline in 1985.
- A former member of the original American Nazi Party, Rocky Suhayda, founded his own organization using the American Nazi Party name and has been active since at least 2008.
- Harold Covington also ran a group that took the name National Socialist White People's Party.

== See also ==
- Fascism in the United States
- Neo-Nazi groups of the United States
