= American Fuehrer =

1999 book by Frederick J. Simonelli

- Cover of the first edition
- Author: Frederick J. Simonelli
- Language: English
- Subject: George Lincoln Rockwell and the American Nazi Party
- Publisher: University of Illinois Press
- Publication date: 1999
- Media type: Print
- Pages: 206
- ISBN: 0-252-02285-8
- OCLC: 39856145
- Dewey Decimal: 324.273
- LC Class: E748.R6745 S56 1999

American Fuehrer: George Lincoln Rockwell and the American Nazi Party is a 1999 book by historian Frederick J. Simonelli. It was published by the University of Illinois Press in 1999. It is a biography of the neo-Nazi political activist George Lincoln Rockwell, the founder of the American Nazi Party, who was assassinated by one of his followers in 1967. It was the first mainstream biography of Rockwell published. In writing the book, Simonelli, then an assistant professor of history at Mount St. Mary's College, drew on interviews, government documents, and family files related to Rockwell.

American Fuehrer tells of Rockwell's life, beginning with his 1967 assassination by his former follower John Patler, then retreating to his childhood, path to becoming a neo-Nazi, and founding an activity as the leader of the American Nazi Party. It recounts the Solomon Fineberg of the American Jewish Committee's tactic of "quarantine" against Rockwell, which was used to lessen the amount of media attention on him and to prevent him from getting power. In the last year of his life, he began to denazify the party and renamed it the National Socialist White Peoples' Party.

Simonelli argues that Rockwell had a substantial impact on the white supremacist movement in his creation of a more inclusive pan-ethnic white supremacy idea of white power, his combination of neo-Nazism with Christian Identity doctrine, and the fact that he was one of the earliest Americans to express Holocaust denial. The book received positive reviews, with praise for its writing and research. Its analysis of Rockwell received praise from several reviewers, though some found it to not tell the full story. It was compared to Hate, another book on the same subject matter published the same year, by several reviewers.

== Background and publication history ==
American Fuehrer was the first scholarly biography of George Lincoln Rockwell, an American neo-Nazi political activist who founded the American Nazi Party. He predicted the occurrence of a future race war, declared his intention to kill all Jews if he were to obtain power, and called to send all black people back to Africa. Rockwell's organization had few members but had a lasting impact on the far-right movement. In 1967, Rockwell was assassinated by John Patler, one of his former followers.

The book was first published in 1999 by the University of Illinois Press in a 206 page edition. Its author, Frederick James Simonelli (April 22, 1947 – January 6, 2015), then taught at Mount St. Mary's College in Los Angeles, California, where he was assistant professor of history. He had a PhD in history from the University of Nevada, Reno.

The book took nine years for Simonelli to complete, both in research and writing. In writing the book, Simonelli accessed previously unavailable archival documents, among them private family papers, collections, private documents from monitor groups, and Rockwell's Federal Bureau of Investigation file. He also conducted several interviews. The book drew upon Rockwell's correspondences with his mother, Claire Schade, and his correspondences with fellow neo-Nazi Bruno Ludtke. The book came out the same year as another biography of Rockwell and the American Nazi Party, identically subtitled, entitled Hate, authored by William H. Schmaltz.

== Contents ==
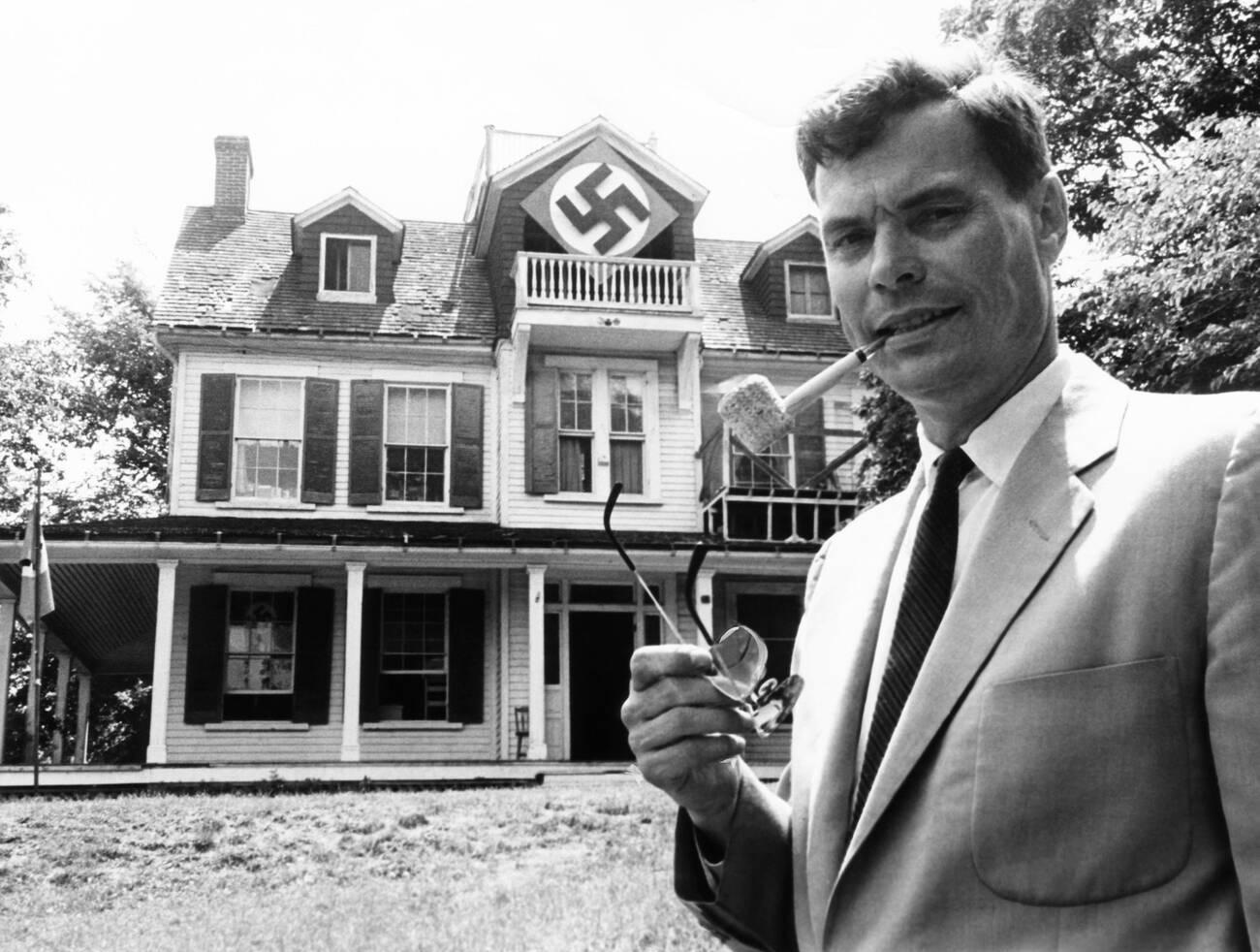
George Lincoln Rockwell in front of the American Nazi Party headquarters in 1965

In an introduction, Simonelli begins with Rockwell's August 25, 1967 assassination at a laundromat, then discussing his career in a brief overview and his status as possibly "the most reviled man in the country". Simonelli then shifts to his origins and upbringing and influence by his parents. Rockwell was born in 1918 to vaudeville performers George Lovejoy Rockwell and Claire Schade, who divorced when he was young. His upbringing was traumatic, with psychological and physical abuse from his aunt; Simonelli argues that his political campaign was a way he turned his pain against the world, to "make his enemies pay for all that had gone wrong in his life". He entered Brown University but dropped out to join the United States Navy. His personal life was often unfortunate; both his marriages ended in divorce, and many of his business ventures failed. In the late 1950s, Rockwell became deeply antisemitic; he read Mein Kampf repeatedly. He founded the American Nazi Party (ANP) in 1958.

Simonelli argues that Rockwell is an example of the "ageless impulse of men and women eaten by the disease of hatred to find a political expression or rationalization for their malady". His family believed he was mentally unwell. He aimed to use outrageous stunts to increase his profile as a path to power; this initially saw some success in attracting attention, but eventually Solomon Fineberg of the American Jewish Committee devised a technique of quarantine, which was used against Gerald L. K. Smith prior, to prevent Rockwell from getting publicity and further power; they encouraged media and Jewish groups to ignore him rather than be outraged by him. This was largely effective, but not entirely, and substantial publicity was garnered by Rockwell on multiple occasions. His only efforts to secure political office failed. At the height of his popularity, he had relatively few followers, and the party was often broke.

Rockwell coined the term white power, which was widely adopted among white supremacists. Rockwell created a sort of pan-white inclusionary white supremacy that included groups such as Slavs and Southern European peoples, rather than Nordic-Germanic ideas as promoted by Hitler and most other neo-Nazis of the time. This created dissension among his ranks, including by his follower and successor Matt Koehl, but Rockwell prevailed. With this change he altered the party's name to the National Socialist White Peoples' Party in 1967. This came as part of an effort to denazify the party and broaden his appeal. Shortly after, he was assassinated by Patler, whom he had kicked out of the party.

Simonelli concludes by addressing Rockwell's legacy. Despite his death and marginality during his life, Simonelli argues that his legacy was substantial on the far-right activists that followed him, in three key ways. One was that he "brokered the marriage between racism and anti-Semitism and theology that provided a spiritual haven within the Christian Identity movement for those seeking justification from God for the hate that drives him". Simonelli also points out he was one of the earliest Americans to deny the Holocaust, and noted his creation of a more inclusive brand of white supremacy in the white power concept as influential, which, according to Simonelli "shattered the barriers of Nazi Nordic elitism and Ku Klux Klan nativism and opened racist politics in America". Simonelli argues that:

To simply say that he failed is to dangerously underestimate the ultimate course of the struggle. [...] Rockwell's legacy remains in those who carry on his work. For them, his words and deeds reach beyond those people he touched and inspire new generations of racists and anti-Semites. [...] Leashing George Lincoln Rockwell did not leash the beast forever. Each generation must confront that demon anew.

The book contains several illustrations, an index, and a bibliography.

== Reception ==
American Fuehrer received positive reviews. Several reviewers praised its writing and narrative, and others praised its research. Arnold Ages for the Chicago Jewish Star called it "a very good book about a very ugly subject". Susan Canedy of The Journal of American History praised it as "an in-depth accounting of the American Nazi party through the personality and personal life of the man who founded it". Publishers Weekly called it an "excellent" and "chilling biography" that "sounds a timely warning against complacency toward contemporary extremists" and that established the influence Rockwell had on subsequent generations of extremists, especially David Duke. Glen Jeansonne wrote that Simonelli had "done an unusually industrious job of piecing together Rockwell’s personal life and painting a compelling human portrait", particularly when it came to his relationship with his mother. John Dumbrell for the Journal of American Studies noted it as a "painstaking study", and the first biography of Rockwell that was a genuine academic effort and not written by a sympathizer. He described it as "a careful and sensible study of the far, far shores of political unreason". Writing for the Houston Chronicle, Chris Patsilelis called it a "riveting, revealing and distressing book". In 2024, scholar Dylan Weir described it as the "definitive text on Rockwell".

Several reviewers compared it to Hate, which was published the same year. Both books were working off similar sources, though Simonelli had access to family papers and correspondence that Schmaltz did not. Comparing the two, Choice reviewer S. K. Hauser wrote that Simonelli had access to more documentation but said his storytelling was inferior to Schmaltz. Gerald Early called them both solid and complementary books; he argued Hate was focused more on biographical elements while American Fuehrer focused more on the "quarantine" and media elements and how Rockwell confronted the Jewish community. He noted the importance both placed on Rockwell as a figure on the racist right. He said neither book was able to satisfactorily explain why Rockwell ended up how he did. Far-righters criticized the book as unfair to Rockwell. Karl Allen, a former member of the ANP, agreed with some points Simonelli and Schmaltz made but disagreed especially on the extent of Rockwell's influence on the then-contemporary far-right. Allen claimed that in contrast to 1990s neo-Nazis, Rockwell's group had been strictly law-abiding and "above-board".

Simonelli's analysis of Rockwell received praise from several reviewers. Alan L. Berger praised it and called it "a careful analysis that integrates political, historical, and psychosocial insights". Leonard Dinnerstein complimented Simonelli's analysis as "insightful" and the book as "well worth reading" in that it "provides a sensible antidote to the shrill cries of hateful leaders". William V. Moore, in an encyclopedic entry on Rockwell, praised its analysis of the man as excellent. Publishers Weekly was more mixed in their assessment of this aspect, and said of the book's portrayal of Rockwell that his "psyche remains elusive" despite the attempted explanations of Simonelli; Dumbrell wrote that despite the explanations, "unsurprisingly, Simonelli cannot really account for Rockwell's wildness." Jeansonne said the book would have benefited from more explorations of his mental state, which the book probed but did not seriously explore.

Mike Tribby for Booklist said the book contained "strong stuff that needs to see the light of day". Canedy further noted Simonelli wrote it in such a way that a reader acquired "a feel for the political fragmentation and turbulence of the 1960s". Canedy said Simonelli depicted Rockwell's life as unfortunate, "his life a soap opera and his organization a tragicomedy" but with charismatic traits that caused the party both good and ill. Robert C. Cottrell found the book's lack of discussion of the influence on militia groups to be curious but described the book overall as a good, if concise, biography of "an important, but deeply troubled individual who sadly left his mark on his times and that which followed." Katharine Whittemore said that despite the dark subject matter, the book was at times funny due to how absurd Rockwell's life and actions were.
