= White power =

White supremacist political slogan and ideology

A white raised fist symbol, used by some white supremacists to represent "white power"

White power is a white supremacist political slogan and ideology. The slogan and its variations are a frequently used white supremacist chant. The slogan was originally used in reference to a kind of pan-white white supremacy espoused by George Lincoln Rockwell, unlike other types of white racism which prioritized Aryan or Nordic conceptions of racism, excluding Slavic or Mediterranean peoples, or traditionally American forms of racism that were anti-Catholic. The term is also sometimes used generically to refer to many different forms of white racist activism collectively, or as a particularly extreme strain of white supremacy. It is also the name of the movement and subculture that follows the ideology, the white power movement. White power as a subculture is active in both the United States and Europe, from which stems the white power music scene and white power skinheads.

The white power slogan was coined in 1966 by neo-Nazi political activist George Lincoln Rockwell, the founder of the American Nazi Party, as a counterslogan to black power. This came with a shift in Rockwell's politics from Nazi racial politics to the white power brand of pan-white racial supremacy, which became the white power racial ideology. Shortly after its coinage, Rockwell utilized the slogan in a high profile counter-march to Martin Luther King Jr. in Chicago, which resulted in coverage of the slogan. The ideology broadened the appeal of white supremacy in America and is popular among white supremacists following Rockwell. Rockwell propounded these ideas in a book, published posthumously after his 1967 assassination, entitled White Power. The white power ideology also influenced the development of white nationalism.

== Concept and ideology ==
White power is a political slogan, a political movement, and an ideology, which serves as an organizing principle for white supremacists. Its original coinage was related to the concept of pan-white supremacy or "white unity". This is opposed to the previous conceptions of specifically "Aryan" or "Nordic" white supremacy, with white power ideology not having a hierarchy of ethnicity outside of the umbrella of "white". The white power ideology also did not exclude Catholics. This ideology included groups like Mediterraneans, Slavic peoples, and other groups of white people then considered "foreign" to the United States, in its conception of the white race. The most important thing was that one be neither black nor Jewish. Scientifically, the idea of race is not considered to be a biological reality and ideas of race vary greatly. Though this white power ideology arose out of American neo-Nazism, it differed from the established racial ideas of contemporary American white racists, who were instead entirely Protestant and more focused on Nativism. It also differed from Adolf Hitler and the Nazi Party's idea of race, which was only focused on Nordic-Germanic peoples as the "master race" and had other European ethnic groups at varying levels on a hierarchy of race.

Outside of its usage as a slogan, the original Rockwell definition of white power is not universal and many alternative definitions exist, several of which conflate or equate it with other, similar terms, or distinguish them. It is sometimes used as the overarching term for the many different types of white racist ideologies. Patricia Ventura and Edward Chan defined white power as "the current extremist form of white supremacy" and also to refer to a "conglomeration of ideologies and activities commonly designated as white supremacy, white nationalism, white separatism, (white) ethnonationalism, and the far right". Scholar Kathleen Belew defined the white power movement more generally to refer to "the social movement that brought together members of the Klan, militias, radical tax resisters, white separatists, neo-Nazis, and proponents of white theologies such as Christian Identity, Odinism, and Dualism between 1975 and 1995", also referred to as the racist right, white nationalists, white separatists, or white supremacists. She drew a distinction between white nationalism and this definition of white power, with white nationalists desiring a less violent outcome. According to Betty A. Dobratz and Stephanie L. Shanks-Meile, white supremacist John C. Sigler III said it was "a generic term denoting a pro-white position".

== History ==
=== Coinage and development ===
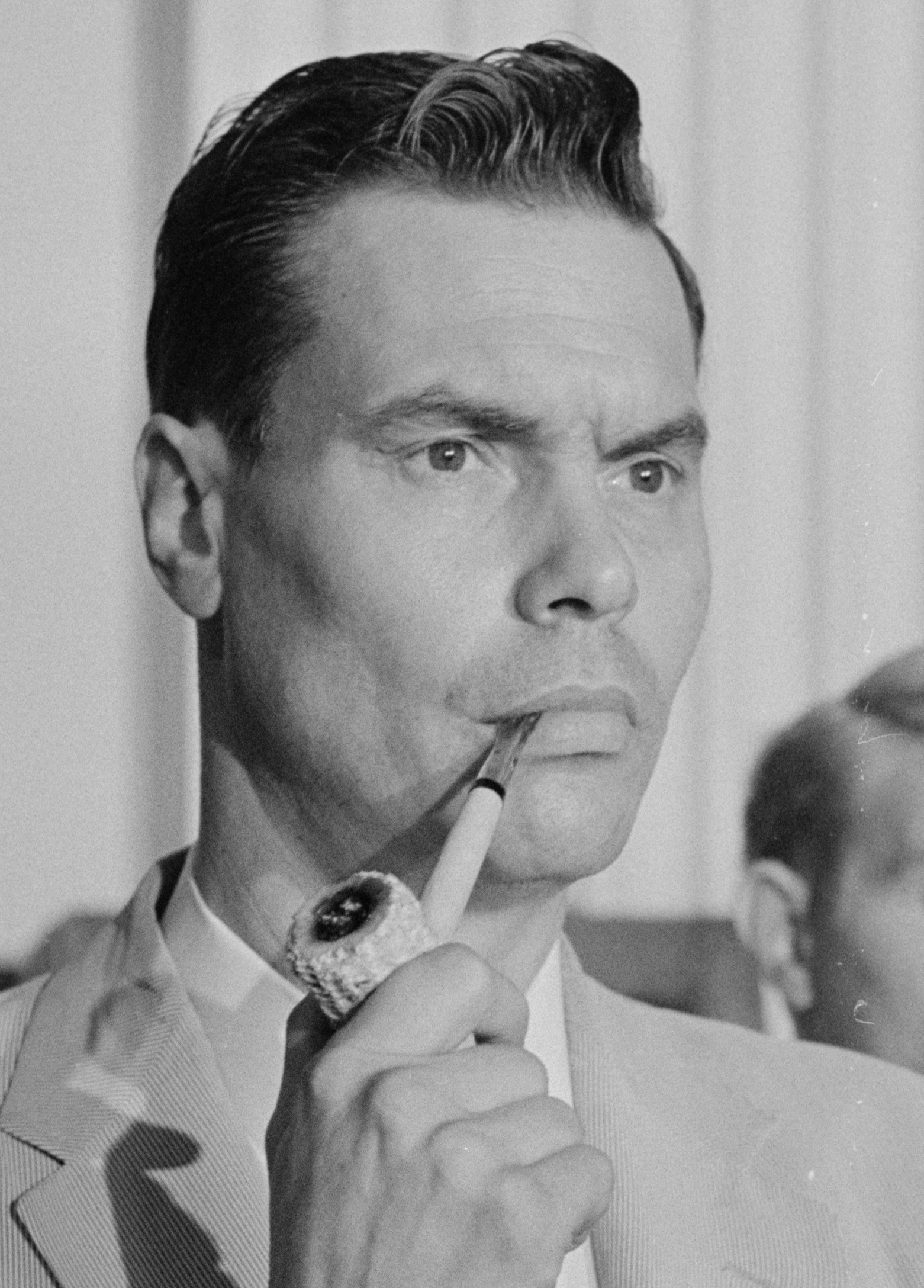
George Lincoln Rockwell, who coined the term, in 1963

The term "white power" and the associated ideology were coined in 1966 by neo-Nazi political activist George Lincoln Rockwell, the founder of the American Nazi Party. At the time, the slogan black power and the associated raised fist symbolism, popularized by Stokely Carmichael and used by the black nationalist movement, was making the news nationwide. This frightened many white people and provided fuel for militant racists across the United States. Rockwell, seeing an opportunity here, coined "white power" as a counterslogan and promoted the slogan, and related ideology, as a counter to black nationalism, and to rally white people around racism. Rockwell also called the ideology "White Unity". In the development of this idea, Rockwell was assisted by neo-Nazi Bruno Ludtke.

This came with a shift in his party from explicit Nazi imagery to white power in an effort to give it wider appeal, something he had struggled with for years. With the slogan came the ideology. He had previously written of the need for the National Socialist movement to adapt and said that "white racial political unity" had to be their key goal. Rockwell justified this change from Hitler's racial ideology because, given the amount of immigrant white people to the United States, largely of Eastern or Southern European descent, any racist movement that did not also include and appeal to them had no prospects. A key member of Rockwell's party, John Patler, was also ethnically Greek, leading to disputes over his presence. Patler coined a slogan used by the party that reflected the white power ideology: "The color of your skin is your uniform."

The change in doctrine towards the white power pan-white ideology, at odds with the ideas of Hitler, was extremely controversial among Rockwell's followers and members of the American Nazi Party. Some members of the party, especially Matt Koehl, abhorred this change and believed Rockwell had been too influenced by Patler, resulting in a schism between several high-ranking party members and Rockwell: the Rockwell "White Unity" faction, which believed in pan-white white supremacy, and Koehl's "Aryan Unity" one, which kept strictly to Hitler's original racial ideas. This schism was ultimately resolved and Rockwell's side won out.

=== 1966 White Power marches ===
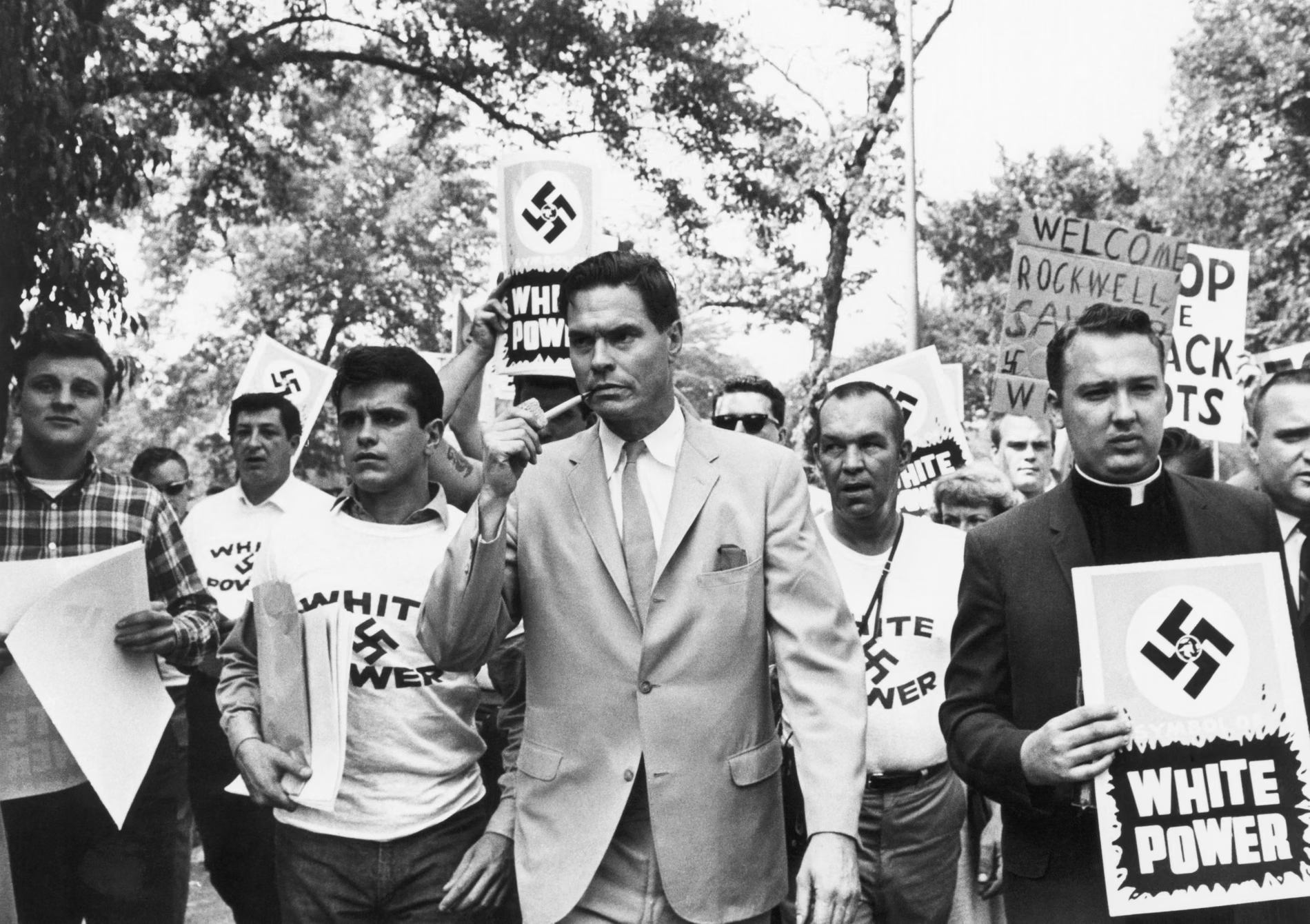
Rockwell (center), flanked by John Patler (left) and Ralph Perry Forbes (right), at a white power march in Chicago in September 1966

By mid-1966, the white power slogan had been adopted by white supremacists across the United States. That year, Martin Luther King Jr. and his supporters were marching for racially integrated housing in Chicago, then one of the biggest segregated cities in the Northern United States, as the Chicago Freedom Movement; this came at a time when King's political advances had slowed, and he was seeking proof that his peaceful strategy was more effective, rather than a militant one. Rockwell saw this as an opportunity to test the white power tactic, with Chicago's working class being made up of white working class people of largely Slavic and Mediterranean immigrant origin who he expected to put up resistance to King. In response, the ANP organized "White Power" marches there to counter King and his supporters.

On August 5, 1966, King and his supporters marched in Chicago, and were met by resistance far beyond what they expected and what they had previously received in the Southern United States. Over a thousand people displayed racist flags, attacked them with objects, and chanted racist slogans; the most used slogan that day was Rockwell's "white power" slogan. The imagery of the white power slogan was heavily covered in news reporting on the march. Rockwell was a significant presence that day, distributing white power paraphernalia and cheering on the rioters with a megaphone. He followed King throughout Chicago and harassed him, resulting in large amounts of publicity for both Rockwell and the American Nazi Party.

The conflicts and white power protests continued through September, and ANP's Chicago area chapter continued to distribute white power materials; while they had previously seen little interest from locals, several picked up their materials. An August 14 protest in Marquette Park by the ANP resulted in what an attending police officer called the closest thing to war he had ever seen. The American Nazi Party received over US$1,500 (equivalent to $14,885 in 2025) in donations from the Chicago area populace. On August 29, Rockwell was arrested for disorderly conduct in response to his actions, garnering even more coverage. Andrew Young, an associate of King, said the response in Chicago was in some ways far more frightening than the violence they had experienced in the South. The response in Chicago depressed King, who later expressed to journalists that:

I’ve never seen anything like it. I’ve been in many demonstrations all across the South, [...] [and] I have never seen — even in Mississippi and Alabama — mobs as hostile and as hate-filled.

The Chicago white power marches were one of Rockwell's biggest successes. This was short-lived and surface level, with Rockwell being disavowed by those who had marched with him in short order. However, Rockwell, seeing the protest as evidence of the success of white power ideology, decided to change the American Nazi Party's name to the National Socialist White People's Party (NSWPP) and to abandon the Nazi elements including replacing their slogan "Sieg Heil" with "White Power". He also began work on a book of the same name, White Power, and planned a new periodical for the NSWPP (also called White Power). In February 1967, during a speech at Mankato State College, Rockwell declared that "the only answer is white power." Rockwell was assassinated on August 25, 1967, by Patler. His book White Power, published posthumously, espoused these viewpoints, and became a great influence on the ideology of future white supremacists.

=== Later developments ===
The white power ideology was popular among white supremacists after Rockwell, and it was influential on the development of the ideology of white nationalism. Scholar Frederick J. Simonelli said Rockwell's coinage of the slogan and ideology was one of his most significant legacies, white power functioning as a "unifying concept and an organizing tool" for the white racist movement. Author William H. Schmaltz said of Rockwell's creation of the white power concept that: "Gone was the criterion of being Nordic or Aryan; gone was the Nativist, anti-Catholic prejudice of the Ku Klux Klan. Now anyone white and non-Jewish could belong to a worldwide racist movement that had no internal racial or ethnic hierarchy."

Simonelli argued that the white power idea provided "a theoretical and strategic framework that enabled American racists to broaden their appeal [...] [Rockwell] gathered to him those Hitler would have rejected, permitting them — and their children —to hate as 'white people.' In doing so, he changed the face of racism in America." The movement that follows it has formed a subculture in Europe and the United States. The idea of leaderless resistance has also been popularized among the white power movement, and some advocates of white power have been committed to overthrowing the United States government and establishing a white ethnostate using paramilitary tactics.

== Usage of the slogan ==
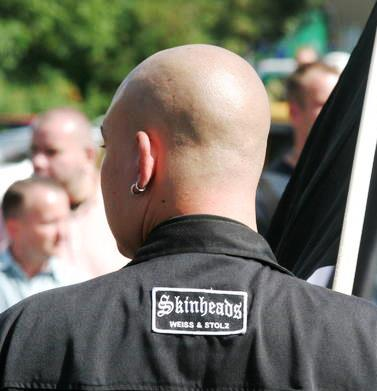
A white power skinhead wearing a patch that says "Skinheads / Weiss & Stolz" ("Skinheads / White & Proud") in German

The slogan is used to express a desire among the white supremacist movement for control over the political situation, usually involving white separatism. Views on this among white supremacists vary, with some desiring it as a goal and some thinking it is ineffective. Some white supremacists, such as Tom Metzger, have criticized the slogan, because most people in powerful government positions were white but were not on the side of the racist movement. White power is used as a chant by itself, often at rallies. Other slogans used by white power activists have included "What do we want? White Power! When do we want it? Now!"

The slogan is often used alongside the separate white supremacist expression white pride, but they have separate usages. Sociologists Betty A. Dobratz and Stephanie L. Shanks-Meile identified "White Power! White Pride!" as a common chant among the movement. The slogan was chanted alongside "White Pride" by up to 100 neo-Nazis rallying in Manchester, United Kingdom in March 2015. By the 1980s, the white power movement used a white raised fist symbol, based on the similar black nationalist symbol, as symbolism to represent white power. It is called the Aryan fist or the white power fist. The Anti-Defamation League designates this as a hate symbol.

=== White power music ===
White power also gave its name to the racist music scene, white power music. It is also called white noise music. The white power music subculture has historically served as an important recruiting environment for the white power movement. Beginning in the 1980s, white power ideology has been spread through many independence white supremacist record labels. For some decades the most important white power record company in the United States was Resistance Records. Significant European white power record labels included Germany's Rock-O-Rama Records and Rebelles Européens in France. The British punk band Skrewdriver, which had turned towards becoming a white power skinhead band, released a song entitled White Power in 1982. Skrewdriver's frontman, Ian Stuart Donaldson, was called by scholar Jeffrey Kaplan "the father of skinhead White Power rock".

=== White power skinheads ===
White power skinheads are the racist branch of the skinhead movement. Many white power skinheads are also involved in the white power music scene. White power skinheads have conflicted with non-racist skinheads over what they claim is a plague on the subculture. Many also conflict with anti-fascist activists.
