= Karl Allen =

American neo-Nazi (1931–2015)

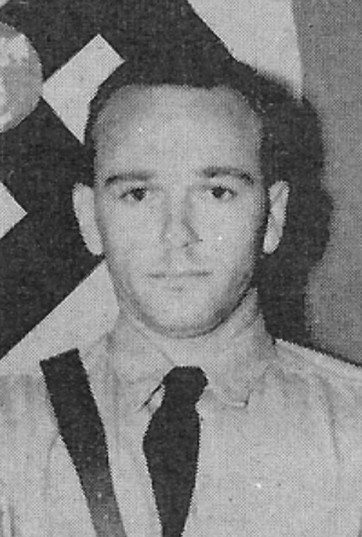
- Allen, pictured 1961
- Born: Karl Rogers Allen Jr. April 23, 1931; Tallahassee, Florida, U.S.
- Died: March 5, 2015 (aged 83); Tallahassee, Florida, U.S.
- Education: Florida State University (BA); Harvard Business School (MBA)
- Political party: American Nazi Party; White Party of America

Karl Rogers Allen Jr. (April 23, 1931 – March 5, 2015) was an American neo-Nazi who was the deputy commander of the American Nazi Party and later the founder of the neo-Nazi group the White Party of America. He worked in developing Florida's economy and was later a manager for bringing nuclear energy to the state; he disliked this job and resigned entirely after they disregarded his recommendations against nuclear energy. He then worked in construction. After becoming a neo-Nazi, Allen abruptly left his job in 1961 and joined George Lincoln Rockwell's American Nazi Party.

Other members of the American Nazi Party initially thought he was a spy, but he rose quickly to being the party's second in command. He demonstrated for the party's anti-civil rights demonstrations and wrote for the party's periodicals. In 1963, Allen was arrested for giving a speech at a counter-protest to the March on Washington. In December 1963, he split from the American Nazi Party due to a personal dispute with Rockwell and created the White Party of America. While it sometimes had more members than the ANP, it attracted far less media attention. He was active in promoting the primary and presidential campaigns for George Wallace in 1964 and 1968. Later in life, he managed bookstores and hotels in Washington, D.C., and Tallahassee, Florida, and was the owner of the Black Cat News Exchange bookstore and newsstand in Tallahassee.

== Early life ==
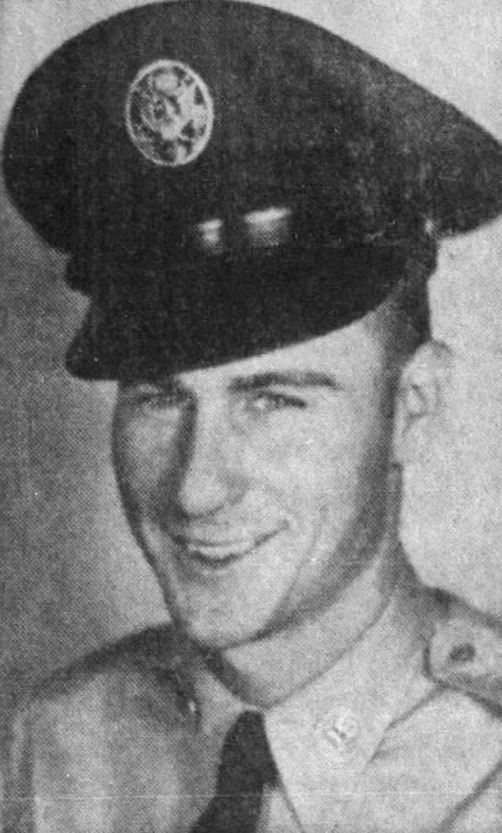
Allen as a private in the army in 1952

Karl Rogers Allen Jr. was born April 23, 1931, in Tallahassee, Florida. He was the son of Carl R. Allen and Cody Harris Allen (née Allison). He had two siblings. Allen graduated from Tallahassee's Leon High School in 1949. During his teenage years and World War II, he was not entirely against Nazi Germany. He developed an interest in architectural drafting.

He enrolled at Florida State University in 1949. That year, he enrolled in the Reserve Officers' Training Corps in his freshman year. During his time at FSU, he was a draftsman for the Florida Park Service for a two-year period. He entered the United States Army in 1952, pausing his studies at FSU. He was given a commission from the Infantry School Officer Candidate School at Fort Benning. He served in the Korean War, and was commissioned as a lieutenant. In 1953, he was assigned to Camp Rucker. After his service in the army, he received a bachelor's degree in political science from Florida State University in 1956.

He then went on to receive a Master of Business Administration degree from the Harvard Business School in 1958. After he graduated from Harvard, he worked as an industrial specialist on the development of the Florida economy with the Florida Development Commission. One of the first things he worked on was bringing Walt Disney to Florida. In June 1960 he was named a state atomic-energy coordinator of Florida to help bring nuclear power to the state, being the manager of the Nuclear Development Department of the commission's Industrial Service Division. He disliked this project, and recommended against bringing nuclear to Florida, which was ignored. He then resigned. Afterwards he worked in construction with his brother.

== White supremacy ==
Allen became radicalized into neo-Nazism after he heard a right-wing speaker and saw what the man said as making everything "[make] sense". Allen later said that after he heard this speaker, he set out to look into the issue himself and came to the conclusion that Nazism and Adolf Hitler were right. In 1961, the American Nazi Party was then making the news due to their high-profile "Hate Bus" campaign; this caught the attention of Allen, who read about them. He drove to their headquarters in Arlington, Virginia, where he picked up some of the party's hate literature but did not immediately join. In August 1961, Allen abruptly disappeared from his job, leaving when it changed administrations. He hitchhiked to Arlington to join the American Nazi Party. His parents reported him as a missing person to Tampa, Florida, authorities; the authorities found his car but could not find Allen himself. They did not find out where he was until several months later, when he turned up a member of the American Nazi Party.

Recounting his radicalization, Allen later described Nazism as "the Cause [neo-Nazis] were born to serve" and as a "call", and said it satisfied a drive he could not otherwise fulfill. Allen claimed that prior to becoming a neo-Nazi he had never felt a sense of "doing something really worthwhile" besides making money. He said that he believed Nazism to be a key part of his identity, inborn, and claimed that he had come to it purely through internal processes. He claimed, "Nazis are born not made", and said the other members of the ANP shared the same experience. When they learned what he had been doing, friends and family were embarrassed and expressed confusion and concern at this political change. An associate said previously Allen had been "liberal, almost ultra-liberal", not even conservative, much less someone who would join a Nazi Party.

=== American Nazi Party ===
Describing the experience in the group, he said: "No one knew what to expect, but everyone agreed it was not what they expected." He moved into headquarters and acquired local employment. Because of Allen's credentials, some of the other members of the ANP thought he was too good to be true; hence, they worried he was a spy. To check if he was, they put him through a series of trials to prove his loyalty, and an entire "anti-Allen" clique sprung up within the group, one of them being Ralph Perry Forbes. Among other things, they made up entire fake campaigns to see if Allen would leak the information and made him fill out multiple applications. Despite this, Allen, being older and far more educated than most other members of the party, quickly rose within the ranks of the ANP. The members who were initially against him, including Forbes, later became good friends with him. He was a lieutenant in the ANP and secretary in May 1962. Rockwell put him in charge of headquarters due to his leadership abilities. He was close to Rockwell, though not personally, and eventually rose to being its deputy commander and second in command.

In January 1962, he and another ANP member were sent to Bucknell University in Lewisburg, Pennsylvania to try to convince them to let Rockwell speak, which did not work. That year, he tried to organize a Florida-based chapter of the ANP in Jacksonville and tried to recruit in Miami; he declared to The Miami News that the ANP was an explicitly racist party and that if Rockwell were to become president he would "execute Jew traitors". Come March, fellow ANP member Bernard Davids and Allen demonstrated against Congress of Racial Equality protestors. Allen dragged a homemade Soviet flag on the ground, which led to both men being arrested for disorderly conduct; the conviction was appealed and overturned the next year. The next month, he and Rockwell attended the senate testimony of Edwin Walker, who accused government officials of being part of a government conspiracy. They were allowed to sit, but the next day both were removed from the chamber when Rockwell wore a swastika emblem.

In May 1962, the state attorney seized an ANP letter with Allen's name on it. The letter was written to an ANP sympathizer, Donald W. Branch. Allen had met with Branch and had sent him the ANP's literature; the letter was seized after Branch was arrested for plotting to assassinate Florida's Attorney General Richard Gerstein and accused of bombing the home of a newspaper editor. This resulted in the Florida authorities finding out where he was after he had been reported as a missing person. When the Virginia House of Delegates revoked the ANP's corporation charter in June 1962, Allen appealed to Albertis Harrison, the governor, to veto it. This was not done, but the ANP's charter was shortly thereafter recreated under a different name, with the single change of Allen replacing another on the ANP's incorporated board of directors.

Allen wrote for the ANP's periodicals, including The Rockwell Report and The Stormtrooper Magazine. Allen was critical of fascist ideologue Francis Parker Yockey for allegedly having left-wing sympathies. In a 1963 issue of The Rockwell Report, Allen expressed criticism of Yockey's book Imperium and his followers, saying that though it was mostly established Nazi thought, they were veering towards "an off-brand type of 'anti-Semitic communism'", and said it was suspicious that he was objecting to his investigation by the Federal Bureau of Investigation. At a later stage, he declared himself influenced by the book, in addition to Oswald Spengler's The Decline of the West and Lothrop Stoddard's The Revolt Against Civilization. In another issue of the Rockwell Report, he implied Martin Luther King Jr. was a communist.

=== Promotion and Martin Luther King Jr. ===
In 1963, several ANP members were imprisoned for an extended period in Philadelphia without facing trial or being able to make bail; Allen protested with leaflets after leading a group to the city, and successfully petitioned for a writ of habeas corpus for them. This plan worked, and the American Civil Liberties Union brought them a lawyer. All were declared not guilty. Afterwards, Allen rose in the party and he was promoted to deputy commander, replacing J. V. Morgan, which he accepted on the condition that Morgan approve. Allen became so important to the party that Rockwell banned him from going to their protests, not wanting him to spend time in jail. Allen became the one to get the party members out of jail by obtaining bail money from the ANP's sympathizers, something Rockwell could not do. When former ANP member John Patler reappeared and asked to be readmitted into the party, Allen, who did not know Patler, was convinced by Rockwell to vote for his readmission; this resulted in several immediate resignations. In June, Allen and another ANP member jumped in front of a civil rights procession while wearing gorilla costumes with signs that read "Join Our March for Civil Rights". Most onlookers did not get what they were trying to say and were merely confused. Police officers arrested them shortly after.

Later that year, Rockwell led members of the American Nazi Party in a counter-protest to Martin Luther King Jr.'s August 28 March on Washington. About 70 ANP members attended as part of the counter-demonstration, including Allen. Shortly after 11 a.m. Allen started speaking, before a police captain told him that if he continued to speak, he would be arrested, as speeches were prohibited. He did so again and was warned again. He tried to speak for a third and final time and declared: "We are here to protest by as peaceful means as possible the occupation of Washington by forces deadly to the welfare of our country." After saying those words, Allen was then arrested and taken to the emergency quarters of the local court for a fast track trial. Allen was the first arrested that day, out of only three people. He was let go fifteen minutes after he arrived in jail (where he was the only prisoner) on US$300 (equivalent to $3,155 in 2025) bond. After a short trial, Allen was found guilty by a DC court and sentenced to 10 days in jail or a fine of US$50 (equivalent to $525.82 in 2025) for giving a speech without a permit. He appealed this and won because the government failed to prove that he had given the speech in the place it was prohibited. While the party marched in Arlington, Allen later criticized the affair to the reporter, saying "most people must be showing their approval by staying away". He claimed it represented that "a group of people can take control of Washington for their own purposes" said the march was instigated by communists, and called the whole march "the first stage of the communist revolution in America".

In November, when King was set to speak in Danville, Virginia, to set up a dialogue with whites, Rockwell sent Allen and another member to instigate against him. On November 15, while King was being introduced to speak at High Street Baptist Church, Allen asked if he could speak. To the largely black audience, Allen said he was the deputy commander of the American Nazi Party. He was almost dragged off stage and the audience called for him to stop, but King repeatedly insisted that Allen be allowed to speak. Allen proclaimed his opposition to King and said that he was a Jewish puppet. Afterwards the police escorted him away to a bus stop. This was praised by Rockwell. Rockwell initially planned to have Allen stay there for some time to harass King "by any means legal", but this plan was derailed by the Kennedy assassination. Afterwards, Allen left Danville.

=== White Party of America and George Wallace ===
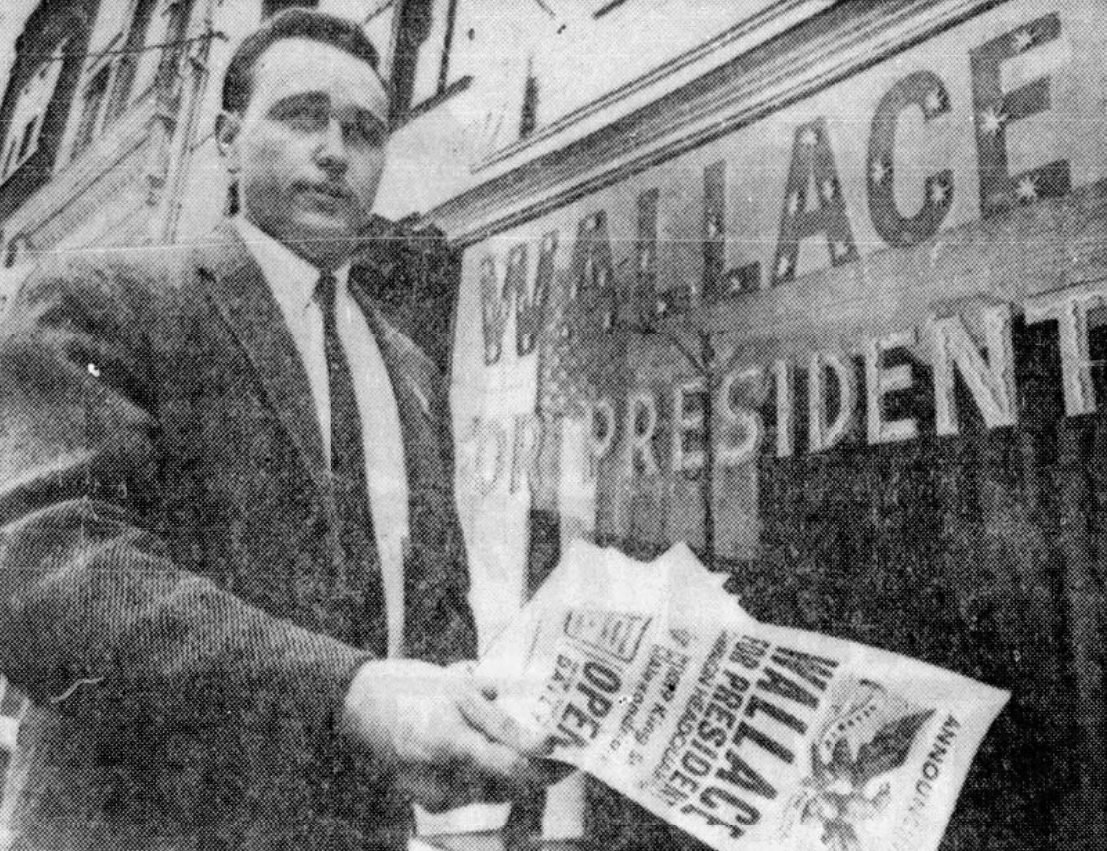
Allen handing out pro-Wallace literature in 1967

Rockwell's money habits and usage of the ANP's funding resulted in regular problems for the party. An associate begged him to either appoint someone as the party's treasurer or to give Allen control of the group's finances, which was not done. In 1963, a sympathizer stopped and requested a meeting; Rockwell told Allen he was "too busy" to attend. The sympathizer met instead with Allen and gave him US$1,800 (equivalent to $18,929 in 2025), a massive amount for the party; Allen held back some of the funds to help pay for a record project, which Rockwell was nervous about but agreed to. Allen grew to find Rockwell's style of leadership increasingly intolerable. He wanted a party that could grow itself and be accountable to a board of directors and not merely be reliant on shock protests like the ANP was. While he admired some aspects of Rockwell's leadership, he blamed him for, in his view, failing to properly organize the party, which resigned it to being one man's cult of personality.

Allen left the ANP on December 8, 1963, saying this was for personal reasons. Both Allen and Rockwell attributed this to personality difficulties with the other. Allen then moved to Washington, D.C. This surprised Rockwell, but he said that he had left on good terms and could rejoin whenever he liked. Following Allen, many party members left, and with Allen they created a list of grievances to be addressed if they were to rejoin. Rockwell did not agree to their demands, and they were kept out of the party. On April 11, 1964, Allen founded the neo-Nazi White Party of America in Washington, D.C. He was one of many former members of the American Nazi Party to create their own groups. He took several ANP members with him in a schism, which was a sizable chunk of the party.

The White Party's first action was to picket in two cities protesting proposed civil rights legislation. Despite the fact that they at times had more members than the ANP, they attracted little media attention, possibly due to their less explicitly Nazi branding. Allen claimed 200 members in the area of Baltimore to Washington, D.C., which one analyst called an unrealistic estimate; another time he claimed 150. They occasionally published a group newsletter, The White Letter. His aim with the White Party, which he called a "racial political party" was to be less internationalized than the ANP, focus more on nationalism, and be more "politically realistic". At this time Allen was a self-avowed white supremacist and declared his intention to have all black Americans deported to Africa, solve the "Jewish Question" by geographic isolation, and to work against real estate figures trying to racially integrate neighborhoods; the group self-described as "frankly racist". He aimed for the party to run its own candidates.

The White Party of America party moved to Alexandria, Virginia. In 1964, Allen worked on George Wallace's 1964 primary campaign, and that year he and other White Party members campaigned for him. Allen was involved in the George Wallace 1968 presidential campaign, as was the White Party as a whole; however, they said Wallace was not racist. He opened a Wallace-for-President headquarters in Alexandria in 1967, which was not officially sanctioned by the Wallace campaign. One commentator alleged that the 1964 campaign was clearly sanctioned by Wallace. The headquarters was decorated with Confederate flags and right-wing literature. Allen said they were encouraging Wallace to run on a third-party ticket.

In February 1966, Rockwell offered the members of the White Party of America complete amnesty if they returned to the ANP. They declined due to Rockwell's refusal to change the ANP's corporate model. The ANP was later renamed the National Socialist White People's Party in January of the next year in an effort to "de-Nazify" the party. In June 1967, meetings were held that debated a variety of changes to the party. Among these were the possible combination of the White Party of America with the NSWPP. This time, they decided to hear him out but were slighted when they did. It was also discussed that Allen be reconciled to the party and brought in as Rockwell's future successor. As it stood then, Rockwell's second in command and successor was Matt Koehl, who was known as something of a "Hitler cultist"; it was suggested that his placement in the party be reduced in favor of Allen.

In August 1967, shortly before a final reconciliation meeting between Rockwell and Allen was to be held, Rockwell was murdered by John Patler. As a result, Koehl was the actual successor to Rockwell. While Allen had issues with Rockwell, he saw his death as the loss of the neo-Nazi movement's only real leader. Allen initially agreed with the conclusion that Patler was the killer but came to believe there was a Jewish conspiracy against the party that blamed it on the members. He rejected Patler as the perpetrator of the murder and orchestrated the John Patler Defense Fund and the Free Patler Committee; alternatively, this may have all been a deflection campaign to avoid embarrassment for the neo-Nazi movement. There is no evidence for anyone being the culprit besides Patler, who was ultimately convicted of the murder. Allen later criticized Koehl as a "robot" and said, "the only reason he leads the party now is because everyone else left is even dumber than him".

In May 1968, Allen appeared as a guest on The Joe Pyne Show.

== Later life and death ==
Afterwards, Allen operated hotels and bookstores in D.C. for several decades and did "freelance auditing" for hotels. He was also affiliated with White Citizens' Councils. He later moved back to Florida, where he worked with DuBey's Bookstores as a manager. In 1992, Allen bought the DuBey's Store from Bill Dubey and renamed it Black Cat News Exchange (also just called Black Cat News) as a newsstand and book store in Tallahassee, which he managed. The name was taken from a 1960s newsstand called Ben's Black Cat, which DuBey's had succeeded. In 1996, he said that he believed the publishing industry to be "beset by racism".

In 1995, the store's annual revenue was US$482,800, mostly from book sales. He had two actual black cats, which he allowed to roam freely through the store. Saying he was "old and tired and wanting to go on", he stopped selling books at the store and shortened the open hours in 1997. Allen sold Black Cat News in 1998. The cats were also sold as part of the deal. He said he would retire to work on books, some of which he had been working on for several decades, on Oswald Spengler's philosophy of history.

In 1994, he gave an interview about his experiences in the American Nazi Party to author William H. Schmaltz for his book Hate: George Lincoln Rockwell and the American Nazi Party. In 1999, the same year that book and another book about Rockwell, American Fuehrer by Frederick J. Simonelli, released, Allen recounted his experiences disrupting the King rally to the Danville Register & Bee. Allen agreed with some points the authors made, but disagreed especially on Rockwell's influence on the then-contemporary far-right. Allen claimed that in contrast to 1990s neo-Nazis, Rockwell's group had been strictly law-abiding and "above-board".

Allen died March 5, 2015, in Tallahassee at the age of 83. After his death, Nazi-related materials owned by him were purchased from fellow former ANP member Bernard Davids to form a collection to the Kenneth Spencer Research Library Archival Collections at the University of Kansas.
