= Hate (book) =

1999 book by William H. Schmaltz

- Cover of the first edition
- Author: William H. Schmaltz
- Language: English
- Subject: George Lincoln Rockwell and the American Nazi Party
- Publisher: Brassey's
- Publication date: 1999
- Publication place: United States
- Media type: Print (hardcover)
- Pages: 388
- ISBN: 1-57488-171-X
- OCLC: 39800703
- Dewey Decimal: 324.273
- LC Class: E743.5 .S35 1999

Hate: George Lincoln Rockwell and the American Nazi Party is a book about the neo-Nazi political activist George Lincoln Rockwell, the founder and leader of the 1960s American Nazi Party. It was written by William H. Schmaltz, then a lecturer and scholar on hate groups. Hate was published by Brassey's in Washington, D.C., in June 1999 and republished as a paperback the next year. In 2013, it was republished in a revised edition by River's Bend Press as For Race And Nation: George Lincoln Rockwell and the American Nazi Party.

After giving a biographical introduction on Rockwell's early life and political history, the book focuses on a year-by-year treatment of Rockwell's political history from his public exposure as a white supremacist in 1958 to his assassination in 1967. Schmaltz emphasizes Rockwell's legacy among white racists, particularly in his Holocaust denial, coining of the term and ideology of white power, and combination of neo-Nazism with Christian Identity doctrine.

Hate received praise for its writing, research, and storytelling from several reviewers, and was recommended for background on Rockwell. Hate was also compared to American Fuehrer, another book on George Lincoln Rockwell and the American Nazi Party published the same year, by several reviewers. The two books were noted to have largely similar conclusions and work off similar sources, but differ in content.

== Background and publication history ==
William H. Schmaltz was a lecturer who focused on hate groups. The American Nazi Party (ANP) was a neo-Nazi political party founded by George Lincoln Rockwell in 1959; he aimed to achieve political power and positioned himself against gay people, Jews, and civil rights activists. The group was small and according to Schmaltz never had more than 200 members. Rockwell was assassinated by a disgruntled former follower in 1967.

In writing the book, Schmaltz used FBI documents and materials on Rockwell and the ANP, then recently declassified. It also interviewed several former members of the ANP and Rockwell associates. A pre-release news article named it as Hate: The Biography of George Lincoln Rockwell. Hate was published by Brassey's in Washington, D.C., in June 1999. Its first edition had 384 pages.

It happened to release the same year as another book on Rockwell and the American Nazi Party, American Fuehrer by Frederick J. Simonelli. Simonelli's book was also subtitled George Lincoln Rockwell and the American Nazi Party. Some of Schmaltz's work is itself based on a prior dissertation from Simonelli. Both American Fuehrer and Hate worked off of some similar documents, though Simonelli, the author of American Fuehrer, had access to family papers and private correspondences that Schmaltz did not.

In 2000, Hate was re-released as a paperback by the same publisher in a 388-page edition. In 2013, the book was reprinted in a revised edition by the Minnesota publisher River's Bend Press under the title For Race And Nation: George Lincoln Rockwell and the American Nazi Party. This edition has 453 pages.

== Contents ==
The first edition of the book has a foreword by George Victor, and a preface by Schmaltz; the 2013 edition has a different preface by Schmaltz. In an introduction, Schmaltz writes of a June 22, 1960 courtroom experience of Rockwell, where he was mobbed in the courtroom and received national publicity. From then on, the contents of the book are largely chronologically ordered, beginning with one chapter on Rockwell's early and family life before becoming a neo-Nazi, his "political sleep" as an artist and military official, before a chapter on his "awakening" as a neo-Nazi following his reading of Mein Kampf. Afterwards, the book goes year-by-year focusing on Rockwell's path as leader of the ANP, from 1958, the year Rockwell was publicly exposed as a white supremacist, until his assassination by his former follower John Patler in 1967. This chronological ordering ends with the ends of Patler's appeals against his conviction.

Schmaltz argues that modern day neo-Nazis all trace their ideology from Rockwell. He particularly emphasizes Rockwell's tripartite legacy on white racism: Rockwell's Holocaust denial, coining of the term and ideology of white power, and combination of neo-Nazism with Christian Identity doctrine. In an epilogue, Schmaltz covers the actions and legacies of Rockwell's associates and the future of the ANP, including his successor Matt Koehl, William Luther Pierce, and Ralph Perry Forbes. He writes of recent developments in the neo-Nazi movement, and concludes that "Hatred like George Lincoln Rockwell's is eternal. It is something that each generation must contend with, something that every person must reconcile within themselves. We must each look within ourselves to see whether the light that is in us is not really darkness." It contains photos throughout, as well as a bibliography and an index.

The 2013 edition, For Race And Nation, contains a different preface than the first edition and lacks the foreword of the first edition. It contains some updates from the 1999 edition but is largely identical in text and organization. It also contains an afterword by John Patler's son, Nicholas Patler, where he writes about his father's childhood and said that his father had disavowed his views and now considered that time in his life to be one of "temporary insanity".

== Reception ==
The book's writing, storytelling, detail, and research were praised by reviewers. William V. Moore called it a "thorough history and analysis" of Rockwell. In his book Black Sun, Nicholas Goodrick-Clarke noted it as offering "extensive background" on Rockwell. Library Journal's Stephen H. Shaw highly recommended the book for public and academic libraries, calling its thesis on Rockwell's importance and influence persuasive and the book "critically important". Shaw argued that the book's treatment of Rockwell's merging of Christian Identity with Nazi doctrine could have been more carefully considered.

Doug Allyn for The Flint Journal called it frightening and "like a dark fable". Allyn praised Schmaltz's writing and research, and wrote that the book was "a hard look at one of democracy's disadvantages, the freedom to advocate evil". Allyn said the subject matter "reads like an adventure novel". James Ward Lee for the Fort Worth Star-Telegram called Hate a "well-written, detailed narrative of George Lincoln Rockwell's goose-step through American history", but said that Rockwell remained as unknowable as before the book, with Schmaltz having an "inability to get inside the head of this purveyor of racist and ethnic filth". Lee noted it was less of a complete biography of Rockwell's life than one specifically focused on his time as leader of the ANP.

Several reviewers compared it to American Fuehrer, another book on Rockwell and the American Nazi Party which was published the same year. The books have similar conclusions that emphasize Rockwell's legacy on the white supremacist movement and the tripartite influence of Rockwell on white supremacy (Christian Identity influence, Holocaust denial, and white power). Comparing the two, Choice reviewer S. K. Hauser said Schmaltz had better storytelling but Simonelli had access to superior documentation. Reviewing both books, writer Johnpeter Horst Grill noted a stronger focus on some elements that Simonelli barely touched on (e.g. Rockwell's connection with black nationalists Elijah Muhammad and Malcolm X), but said it provided less new information. Scholar Gerald Early called them both complementary and praised both; he argued Hate was focused more on biographical elements while American Fuehrer focused more on the wider reception to Rockwell. He said Hate was more comprehensive when it came to the individual ANP members and day-to-day events, with "a more comprehensive account of the denizens of the underground world of neo-Nazism and the racist Right".

Karl Allen, a former member of the ANP and one of the people interviewed for the book, disagreed with the thesis of both Schmaltz and Simonelli that Rockwell was a substantial influence on contemporary neo-Nazi movements. The year after its publication, Hate was found in the possession of a white supremacist member of the National Alliance arrested for illegal weapons possession. He had amassed a large collection of antisemitic literature and weapons; included in his collection was the book.
