= The Stormtrooper Magazine =

Defunct neo-Nazi magazine

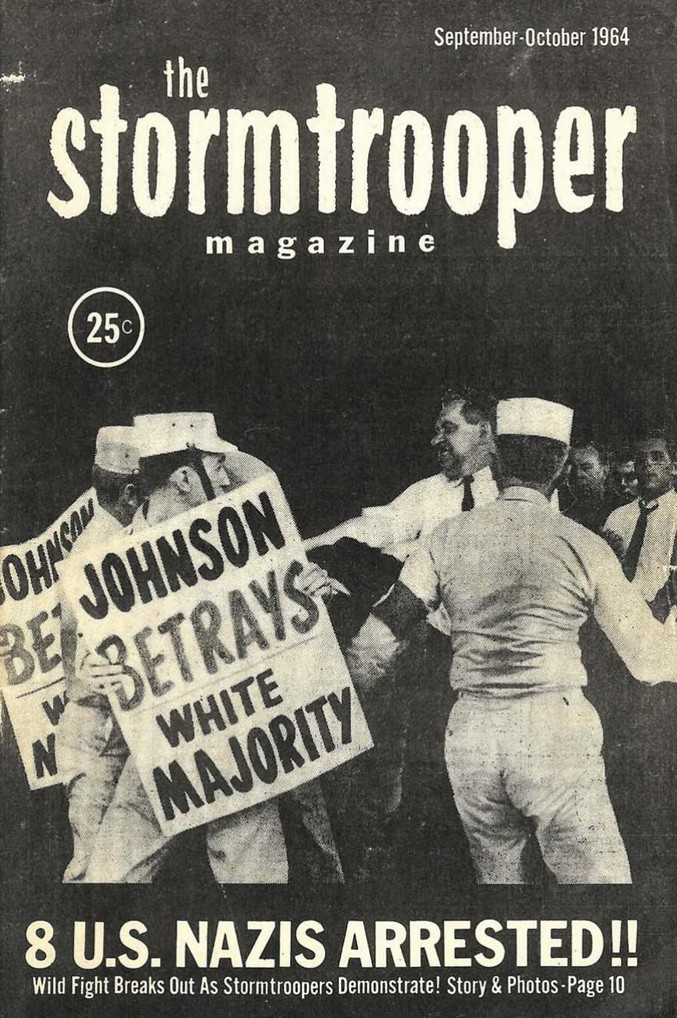
- September–October 1964 issue
- Editor: John Patler
- Categories: News; Politics
- Frequency: Quarterly
- Publisher: American Nazi Party
- First issue: 1962
- Final issue: 1968
- Country: United States
- Based in: Arlington County, Virginia
- Language: English
- ISSN: 0585-3834
- OCLC: 32019468

The Stormtrooper Magazine (also called The Stormtrooper) was the quarterly official publication of the American Nazi Party, a neo-Nazi group founded by George Lincoln Rockwell. The magazine was published in Arlington County, Virginia, the United States, between 1962 and 1968. Contents included illustrations, editorials from Rockwell, and recaps of the activities of the World Union of National Socialists. The periodical succeeded the ANP's earlier outlet, the National Socialist Bulletin. It was one of several periodicals run by the ANP: while the others were aimed at more sophisticated audiences, The Stormtrooper was the more general periodical, and was far more sensationalized.

The party had several editors throughout its life, but for several years it was edited by ANP member John Patler, until he was kicked out of the group in March 1967. In August 1967, Patler assassinated Rockwell. Afterwards, publication of the magazine ceased in 1968, and it was replaced as official party outlet by another periodical, entitled White Power.

== Background ==
The Stormtrooper was operated by the American Nazi Party (ANP), a neo-Nazi group operated out of Arlington, Virginia. The ANP was founded by George Lincoln Rockwell in 1959. The party was renamed to the National Socialist White People's Party in early 1967. The Stormtrooper was launched to replace the party's earlier publication, the National Socialist Bulletin, which had been launched in May 1960. That periodical ran 8 issues before being replaced by The Stormtrooper. The Bulletin was a smaller sized publication, with 15 page issues with black and white photographs.

== History ==
The Stormtrooper Magazine was established by the American Nazi Party in February 1962. The periodicals issued by the party, including The Stormtrooper, were an important part of fundraising for the party, and provided a connection between explicit members and sympathizers. The party sent it and other materials to its affiliated members and organizations which sold them to gain financial support, and sold subscriptions of it as one of their offered goods. Following the 1965 suicide of former ANP member Dan Burros, who had been revealed to be Jewish, he was eulogized by Rockwell in the magazine. Starting in 1966, a printing plant for the magazine was established in Spotsylvania County, Virginia in an old chicken house.

The party had several editors throughout its lifetime. Taking over in early 1964, its editor was John Patler. Patler was kicked out of the ANP in March 1967 over internal disputes and his behavior, among them his failure to produce enough timely issues of the magazine. He produced his final editorial for the magazine, a piece about Benito Mussolini that also reflected upon his own life, in early 1967. After Patler, the editor was Frank Drager.

On August 25, 1967, Rockwell was assassinated by Patler; the August 1967 issue notes Matt Koehl taking over as Rockwell's successor, and recounts his eulogy for Rockwell. The magazine ceased in fall 1968, with its final issue edited by Ralph Perry Forbes and Robert Allison Lloyd. The Stormtrooper ceased publication and was replaced as official party outlet by another periodical, entitled White Power.

In the early 1970s the Australian National Socialist Party published a magazine with the same title, based on the American version. The Australian version was cruder in form and was less professionally put together, but contained similar content, styles, and sections. This magazine put out eight issues through 1972.

== Format and contents ==
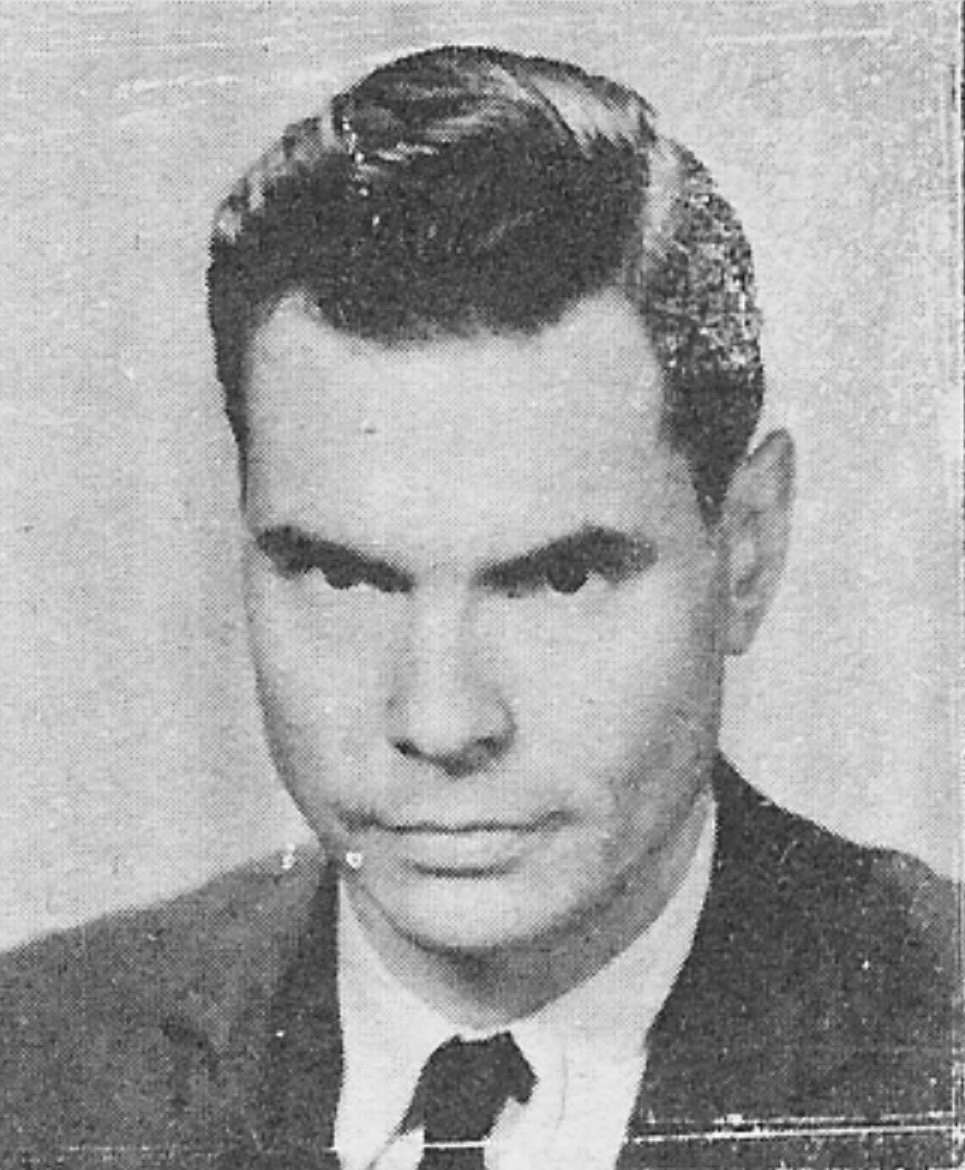
The image of Rockwell used on the "From the Desk of the Commander" section

The magazine was headquartered in and was published out of Arlington. It was issued quarterly. The magazine included artwork and illustrations, including Rockwell's and Patler's artwork, and photographs taken by ANP members. The Stormtrooper Magazine was one of several propaganda publications of the American Nazi Party, and was meant for both consumption by the party and for non-party readers and sympathizers. Apart from The Stormtrooper and its predecessor the Bulletin, the ANP also published The Rockwell Report, starting in 1961; the Report, unlike the Bulletin, was a full-size magazine. The Report ran alongside The Stormtrooper. There was also National Socialist World, but this was aimed at a more "sophisticated" audience of racists. All the different ANP periodicals were designed to target different class audiences, with Rockwell aiming to have each class demographic of white racists covered. The Report was aimed at middle-class readers. Stormtrooper was the one aimed at the most general, base demographic. Rockwell wrote:

"We have designed some great products to appeal to specific customers: the 'hawg-jowl' Stormtrooper, the 'Delmonico steak' Rockwell Report and now the 'Cherries Jubilee' which you hold in your hand, the National Socialist World.

William H. Schmaltz described it, as with the rest of ANP's literature, as developing a unique look by 1963, with "distinctive, lurid look, with eye-catching layouts and provocative headlines"; unlike the others, it was purposefully designed to be eye-catching and shocking in order to grab attention, which Rockwell believed was necessary to garner support from the common man. Relative to the ANP's other periodicals, it was far more sensationalized; Schmaltz wrote that it was "packed with photos, racist humor, cartoons, descriptions of violence, insults, and white power slogans, all designed to capture the attention of American philistines". Some content written by Rockwell was contained in both the Report and The Stormtrooper.

The magazine covered ANP events and activities, and had various sections. One section, "Combat Reports", contained photos of neo-Nazi street protests and actions across the United States. They ran feature stories on party members in the "Know Your Party Officer" section, while the "Brotherhood Beauts" contained racist anecdotes about non-white people. Another section was entitled "From the Desk of the Commander", which included editorials from Rockwell. Writings from Rockwell in this section often espoused violent ideas, such as one section he wrote in a 1967 issue called "WHEN THEY BURN OUR FLAG ... IT’S TIME FOR VIOLENCE", where he called for violence to defend America from the "filthy Red traitors, posing as 'peace' lovers".

Another section was devoted to recapping the international activities of neo-Nazis and the activities of the World Union of National Socialists and affiliated groups. Neo-Nazis from other countries, such as the British neo-Nazi Colin Jordan or Bruno Ludtke, who were celebrated in the magazine. The magazine also offered Nazi and neo-Nazi materials for sale, including leaflets, arm bands, recordings, booklets, and The Protocols of the Elders of Zion. It also featured a neo-Nazi crossword puzzle. One such cartoon that debuted in the magazine was the racist superhero "Whiteman", a parody of Superman, but with a swastika rather than an S on his chest; Whiteman's real name is "Lew Cor", an anagram for Rockwell. Whiteman fights villains such as "Supercoon", created by "Mighty Motza".
