= Brassey's =

Producer of military-related books

Brassey's is variously the name of a publisher, an imprint, or a published series of volumes, all mostly associated with military topics, that was in existence in one form or another from 1886 to around 2005.

== Brassey's in Britain ==
The heritage of the series name dates to the Brassey's Naval Annual, begun by Thomas Brassey, 1st Earl Brassey, the Civil Lord of the Admiralty, in 1886. This large volume became a British tradition in military studies circles and reliably appeared each year. Companies House shows an entity Brassey's Publishers Ltd as existing since 1920. But the actual printing of the Naval Annual was typically done by William Clowes Ltd.

By the late 1970s, Brassey's Publishers Ltd was more often credited as a publisher itself. A 1979 announcement in the bids and deals section of The Guardian labelled Brassey's as "said to be the oldest established name in defence publishing".

In 1980, Brassey's Publishers was acquired by British media mogul Robert Maxwell. The acquisition was announced in December 1979. Subsequently named Brassey's Defence Publishers Ltd, it was a subsidiary of Maxwell's Pergamon Press. Under this name it published military-related volumes during the 1980s, including one called The Military Balance and others produced in conjunction with the International Institute for Strategic Studies in London. It also put out books with related themes, such as Garrison (1987), a socio-historical look at ten British military towns.

By the 1990s, the firm was known as Brassey's Ltd. It continued to publish military-related titles, such as The Lifeblood of War: Logistics in Armed Conflict (1991).

In 1998, Brassey's Ltd was acquired by Batsford Communications PLC. But in 1999 Batsford went into receivership, with pieces being acquired that year by the Chrysalis Group.

Thus by 2000, Brassey's was an imprint of the Chrysalis Books, In the early 2000s, Brassey's was stated as being a division of the Chrysalis Books Group. A sister imprint was Conway Maritime Press.

In 2005, all Chrysalis imprints, including Brassey's, were sold to a new firm composed of the imprints' managers, that firm being named Anova Books Company.

After that, the Brassey's name seems to have faded away as an imprint or a name published under.

== Brassey's in United States ==
In 1983, Brassey's, Inc. was founded as the United States subsidiary of Brassey's. While still mostly known for titles on military history, over time Brassey's, Inc. began publishing works on several other topics including American history and sports history.

The year 1999 saw Brassey's, Inc. being acquired by Books International, a Virginia-based warehouse and distribution company. At this point, the US-based Brassey's became independent of the UK-based Brassey's.

Then in 2004, Brassey's, Inc. was renamed Potomac Books; the newly named imprint further expanded its catalog to include world and national affairs, presidential history, diplomats and diplomacy, and biography and memoir.

Similarly to the UK branch, after this point the Brassey's name seems to have become unused.

== See also ==
- HarperCollins
- University of Nebraska Press
