= Assassination of George Lincoln Rockwell =

1967 murder in Arlington, Virginia, U.S.

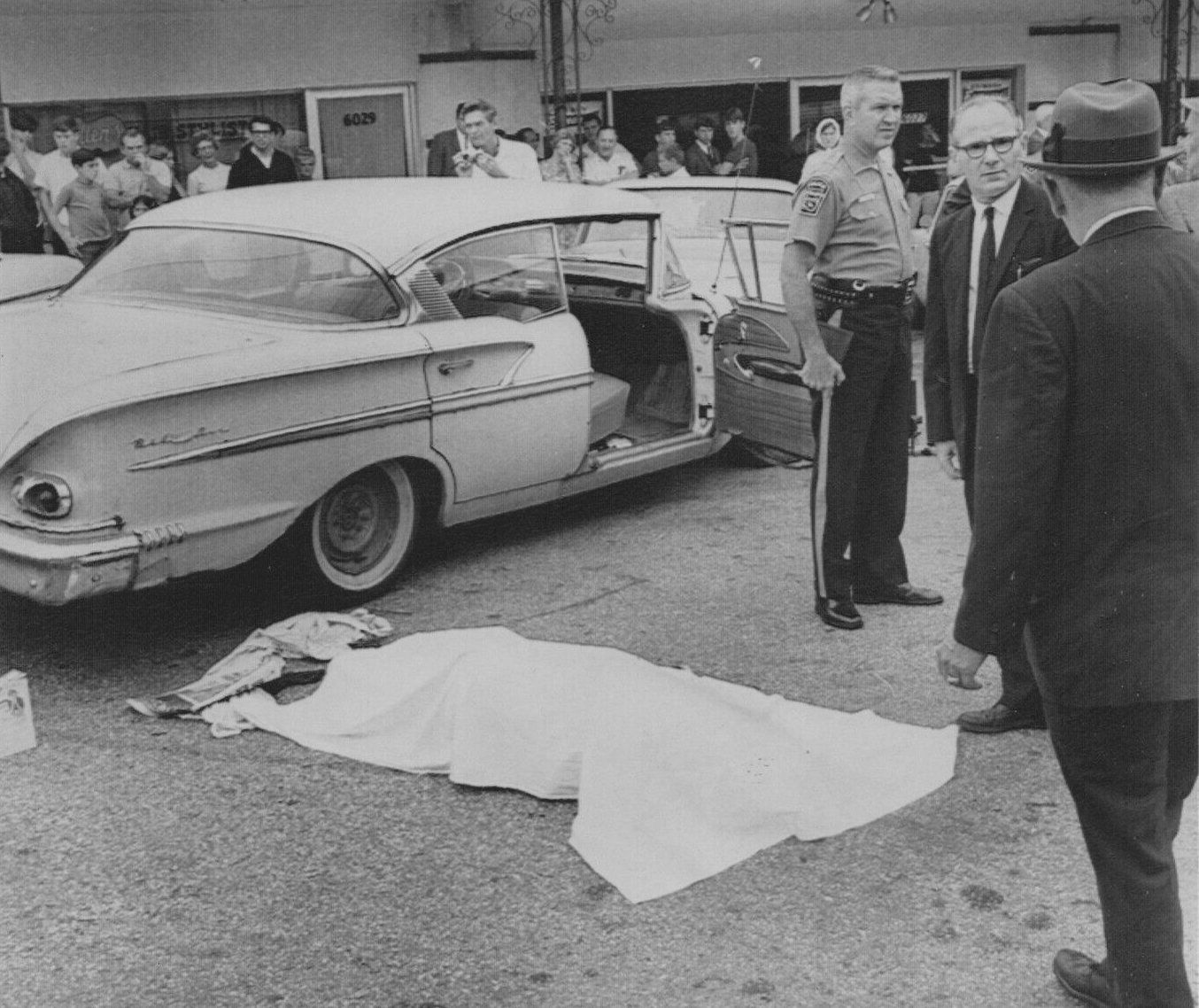
- The crime scene, Rockwell's body covered by a sheet
- Location: Arlington, Virginia, U.S.
- Date: August 25, 1967; 59 years ago 12:02 p.m.
- Attack type: Shooting
- Weapon: Mauser pistol
- Victim: George Lincoln Rockwell
- Perpetrator: John Patler
- Motive: Revenge
- Verdict: Guilty
- Convictions: First-degree murder

On August 25, 1967, George Lincoln Rockwell, an American neo-Nazi political activist and the leader of the National Socialist White People's Party (NSWPP), formerly the American Nazi Party (ANP), was assassinated by John Patler, an expelled member of the NSWPP. Patler fired two shots at Rockwell from the roof of a nearby building, while Rockwell was visiting a local laundromat close to the party's headquarters in Arlington, Virginia. The second shot struck Rockwell in the chest; Rockwell died there at 12:02 p.m. Patler was arrested 45 minutes later, about a mile and a half away.

Rockwell was the founder of the ANP; he was one of the earliest Holocaust deniers, called for forcibly sending all Black people to Africa, and for the murder of Jews. Despite attention and widespread notoriety, neither Rockwell nor his party achieved political power and his following was largely insignificant. Rockwell had a complicated relationship with Patler, who left and rejoined the party several times. Patler was ultimately expelled in March 1967 for a variety of reasons, among them abandoning his post and causing dissension within the group's ranks. In June 1967, Rockwell was subject to an assassination attempt at his home. The perpetrator of this incident was not caught; prosecutors later alleged it to be Patler.

At trial, Patler was convicted of first-degree murder and sentenced to 20 years in prison, of which he served eight. He was paroled, but was returned to prison after violating his parole. The evidence against Patler was circumstantial, and Patler has never admitted guilt, though several legal appeals were all unsuccessful. The funeral itself was highly publicized, with a standoff between Rockwell's followers and authorities. During the resulting chaos, Rockwell's successor Matt Koehl had Rockwell's body smuggled out of the funeral home and cremated.

Rockwell's death had a significant impact on the neo-Nazi movement, and Rockwell was seen as a martyr by them. Though Rockwell was succeeded as group leader by Koehl, Koehl's leadership was poor and resulted in numerous schisms and people being driven from the party. Rockwell's death shocked the neo-Nazi movement, which as a whole decentralized after his death, and experienced large shifts in tactics and ideology. Many conspiracy theories emerged among Rockwell's followers, ranging from baseless allegations of a Jewish conspiracy to a coup by other high-ranking members of the NSWPP. Rockwell continues to be greatly influential on neo-Nazis.

== Background ==
=== George Lincoln Rockwell and the American Nazi Party ===
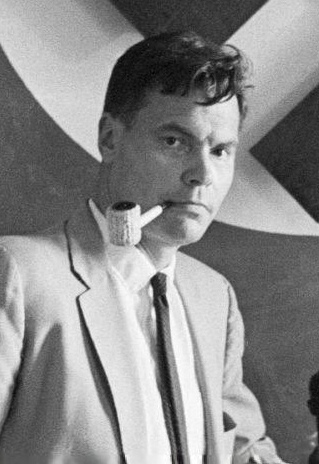
Rockwell in 1965 at the ANP's headquarters

George Lincoln Rockwell was the founder and leader of the American Nazi Party. He had founded the ANP in 1959, effectively the start of the neo-Nazi movement in the United States. He called for gassing "Communist Jews" and forcibly deporting all Black people to Africa; he was also one of the earliest Holocaust deniers. A retrospective 2017 article from The Washington Post said Rockwell was then "one of the most hated men in America". The party had only a few members, but garnered substantial media attention; according to researcher Spencer Sunshine, though Rockwell was not the first American neo-Nazi, Rockwell "started the neo-Nazi movement in the United States as we know it." Scholar William H. Schmaltz wrote that Rockwell was the founder of an "Americanized version of National Socialism".

Despite the attention and widespread notoriety, Rockwell and his party did not achieve political power and his following was largely insignificant. Rockwell ultimately came to recognize that a political movement solely devoted to provocation had limited real-world prospects, and so began to brainstorm new methods. With it came a broader kind of racism, not just believing their audience to be Nordic or Germanic Whites, but Southern and Eastern Europeans, calling this "White Unity". In an effort to "de-Nazify" the party to increase its appeal to the masses, on January 1, 1967, the group underwent several changes, and was renamed to the National Socialist White People's Party (NSWPP). With the name change came a shift in the iconography to be more American.

In a June 1967 meeting, it was agreed that the party would shift away from the German National Socialist model, though the exact details of this meeting were later contested among those who attended. ANP second in command and "Hitler cultist" Matt Koehl opposed all these changes, as did William Luther Pierce, though Rockwell eventually prevailed. It may have been discussed that Koehl be replaced as second in command and successor by Karl Allen, an estranged former member of the ANP, if Allen was brought back into the group. Several reconciliation meetings were held between Allen and Rockwell but Rockwell was assassinated before they could conclude. A week before Rockwell's death, the infant daughter of Rockwell and his mistress Barbara von Goetz died of a congenital illness, saddening him.

=== John Patler ===
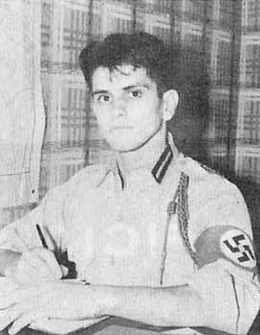
Patler in 1961

Rockwell's eventual murderer was John Patler, a member of the party, who helped produce Rockwell's propaganda as an editor for The Stormtrooper Magazine. Patler was ethnically Greek, which led to criticism of his presence in the party by some neo-Nazis. He changed his surname from Patsalos to Patler to make it sound more like Hitler. Some other party members, mostly Pierce and Koehl, disliked him due to his Greek ethnic background and taunted him. Rockwell liked Patler, whose presence he defended by arguing for the expanded idea of master race which included Greeks; "White" rather than the Nazi idea of "Aryan". Koehl and the members who agreed with him viewed this change as heretical. The changes to de-center the Nazism of the party and apply a broader base of racists that included Southern Europeans, including Greeks, were instigated by Patler.

Patler was known to be unstable and had some Marxist sympathies; he left the ANP in 1961 with Dan Burros to form the American National Party, only to rejoin. Patler viewed Rockwell as a father figure but also blamed him for the problems in his life, and they began to conflict on several points. From 1966 to 1967, Patler drifted in and out of the party. Rockwell also had an affair with Patler's wife. Afterwards, Patler sent Rockwell a letter telling him he was fine with this. Patler and his wife had two children together; after which he became more self-confident and questioned his position in the group. Hating the separation from his family, in March 1967, he left his post in Spotsylvania and returned to Arlington. Rockwell then had the locks on his door cut off and Patler's possessions moved to Arlington.

Afterwards, Rockwell wrote a discharge letter against Patler, including that he was guilty of "abandoning his post, gross insubordination and insulting conduct to superiors, neglect of duties, promotion of dissension among the ranks, promotion of distrust by non-Nordic members of the party, and usurpation of authority". Patler was then immediately dismissed. Rockwell delegated this to Koehl instead of doing it himself. Patler spent the rest of the spring enraged over his treatment, writing letters disavowing Rockwell and the ANP, before again returning to begging for his forgiveness. In his last letter to Rockwell, Patler wrote: "I don't think there are two people on earth who think and feel the same as we do. ... You are a very important part of my life. I need you as much as you need me. Without you there is no future". Rockwell attempted privately to negotiate to bring him back into the organization, asking NSWPP member Chris Vidnjevich to speak with him. Patler was still angry about his dismissal, and told Vidnjevich that: "Rockwell is an evil genius and he must be stopped."

=== Prior assassination attempt ===
Rockwell had been claiming for years that his enemies were stalking him, and said for years that he believed he would be shot to death. Alan Welch, a member of the group, said that several months prior to the assassination, Rockwell had asked him to return to Arlington because he believed that someone was trying to kill him. On June 28, 1967, Rockwell was subject to a failed assassination attempt at his home. He found the party's headquarters' driveway to be blocked with a fallen tree and branches. When Rockwell went to clear it, a shot was fired, only narrowly missing his head. Rockwell attempted to chase the shooter but he escaped, and Rockwell was unable to identify him.

Rockwell claimed that there had been two men. Rockwell's bodyguard Francis Joseph Smith claimed that afterwards, Rockwell told him he may have recognized one of the men, and that he "suspect[ed] treachery from someone very close to me" but that he did not want to say anything because, if he was wrong, it would irreparably damage the party. Pierce said Rockwell told him there was actually only one man. After the murder and Patler's arrest, Hancock recounted witnessing this:

I saw a picture of the man they picked up on TV tonight, and I'm sure he's the one Rockwell and some other boy were chasing that day in June. I almost ran over him. I was in my car on Wilson Boulevard when Rockwell turned into his driveway, and I saw him and the boy with him dive out the door on the passenger's side and then run along Wilson Boulevard.... I turned into the street leading to my house, a man ran out of the bushes on one side, across the road, and into the bushes on the other side.... I had to step real hard on the brakes to avoid hitting him.

After this incident Rockwell contacted the police, and applied for a handgun carry permit two days later. At the time of his assassination, the permit was pending. He also increased his security.

== Assassination ==
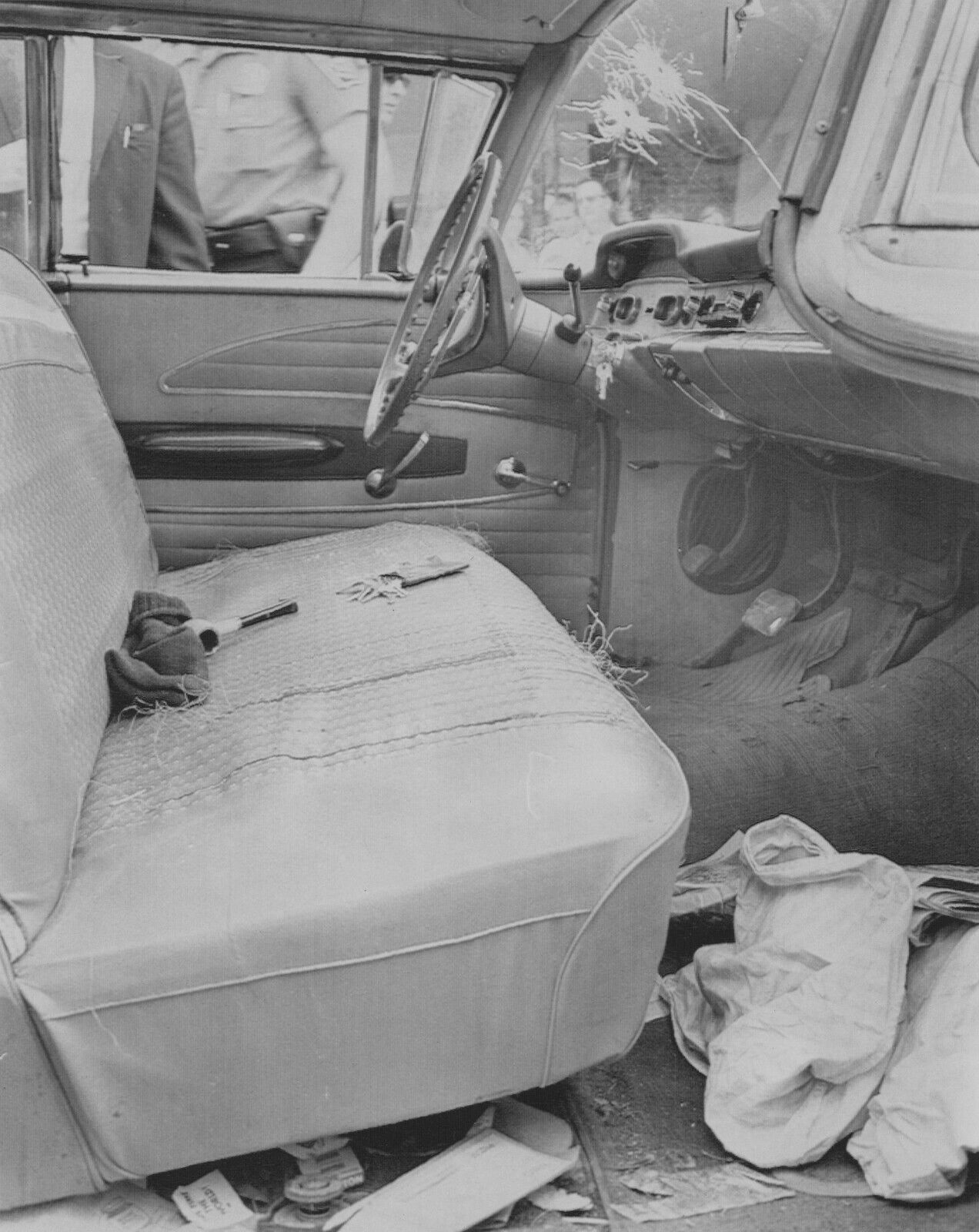
The inside of Rockwell's car following the assassination

On August 25, 1967, Rockwell woke up at 6:30 a.m. and had breakfast with other NSWPP members. The party planned to do an afternoon trip to Washington, D.C., where they would distribute the premiere issue of White Power, the group's new newspaper. Rockwell worked on his book, White Power, which was published after his death. Rockwell left the party's headquarters in Arlington, at 11:30 a.m. to do his laundry. He told the group members that he would be back shortly. The laundromat was close to headquarters, just across Wilson Boulevard. He parked in front of the laundromat.

After entering the laundromat, Rockwell told the attendant, Ruby Pierce, that he had forgotten something. His last words were that: "Oh, I forgot something"; the manager of the laundromat, John Hancock, said it had been bleach. Returning to the car, Rockwell started it, backed out, and put it in drive. While Rockwell was in his car, two shots were fired through the driver's side windshield of his car. The shooter aimed from the laundromat's roof, which was flat and able to be stood on. The killer used a long-barrelled broomstick Mauser pistol. The first shot missed Rockwell, though hit his shirt, nicking the fabric, and instead hit the car's front seat.

The second shot hit Rockwell in the chest and ruptured his aorta. The shot pushed Rockwell back against the car seat and knocked his corncob pipe out of his mouth. The car, now with its driver incapacitated, rolled backwards and bumped another car, ending up at the other side of the lot. Rockwell crawled into the passenger seat, opened the door from inside the car, and stepped out into the parking lot. It took Rockwell a minute or so to die. He rose to his feet, pointed to the roof the shooter had shot from, and turned to look at his headquarters. Rockwell's knees then buckled and he fell to the ground. Rockwell died there at 12:02 p.m, death resulting from massive hemorrhaging resulting from damage to the blood vessels.

== Reaction ==
The killing made headline news internationally and resulted in a wide amount of notoriety. The news cycle was extended, furthered by the disputes that occurred at his funeral. Rockwell's estranged father, the former vaudeville actor George Lovejoy Rockwell, said of his son's murder that: "I'm not surprised at all. I've expected it for quite some time. I think he would have liked to have gotten rid of the whole Nazi mess. He was more afraid of his own men than people were of him." He also said that to him, it seemed like his son had had a sort of premonition of his own death. The mayor of New York City, John Lindsay, said that the killing evidenced "violence breeds violence and extremism breeds extremism", and advocated for increased gun control.

The Jewish community had a generally mixed response. In the aftermath, many Jewish figures and organizations spoke out against violence and for gun control while denouncing Rockwell's beliefs. Journalist Harry Golden called the murder deplorable, and Samuel Samuels, the leader of the Jewish War Veterans of the United States of America, said the killer "has done a great disservice to the nation in the elimination of Rockwell by making a martyr of a despicable enemy of America." Arthur Lelyveld, the president of the American Jewish Congress, called Rockwell "a nuisance rather than a menace to American institutions", but said that the AJC "condemn the use of violence, even when it is directed against the enemies of democracy". Ted Weiss, commented that he abhorred Rockwell's views but that "this violence has no political discrimination. [...] It hits left and the right, the young and the old. This carnage has to be controlled. How much longer do we go on killing people senselessly?" Benjamin Epstein of the Anti-Defamation League stated that the ADL, one of Rockwell's "prime targets, hopes his killer will be brought to justice", but that it was "ironic that a man who for so long advocated and incited violence and trained his followers in the use of firearms, should himself reach a violent end".

Among neo-Nazis nationally and internationally, the reaction was largely one of shock and disbelief. Swedish neo-Nazi Göran Assar Oredsson, the leader of The Nordic Realm Party and a friend of Rockwell, was distraught. British neo-Nazi Colin Jordan, then in jail, said that he felt a "crushing sorrow that such a great leader of men in the Cause, capable of great things in the future, should be lost in the moment of an assassin's bullet". When White supremacist David Duke, then a teenager, learned of Rockwell's death, he broke down sobbing and said "the greatest American who ever lived has been shot down and killed." Allen, who had previously left the ANP and formed his own neo-Nazi group, had his issues with Rockwell, but saw his death as the loss of the neo-Nazi movement's only real leader. Koehl told reporters afterwards that the assassination was "a defeat for every white man".

In a 2000 study of public perception of various high profile assassinations in the Public Opinion Quarterly, 49% of people said they were "not surprised" by Rockwell's assassination, compared to 31% for the assassination of Martin Luther King Jr. and 3% and 8% for the assassination of John F. Kennedy and Robert F. Kennedy, respectively. Further, 19% felt relieved rather than saddened by his death; in comparison, 16% felt relieved about the assassination of Malcolm X, while 7% felt the same about King's.

== Funeral ==
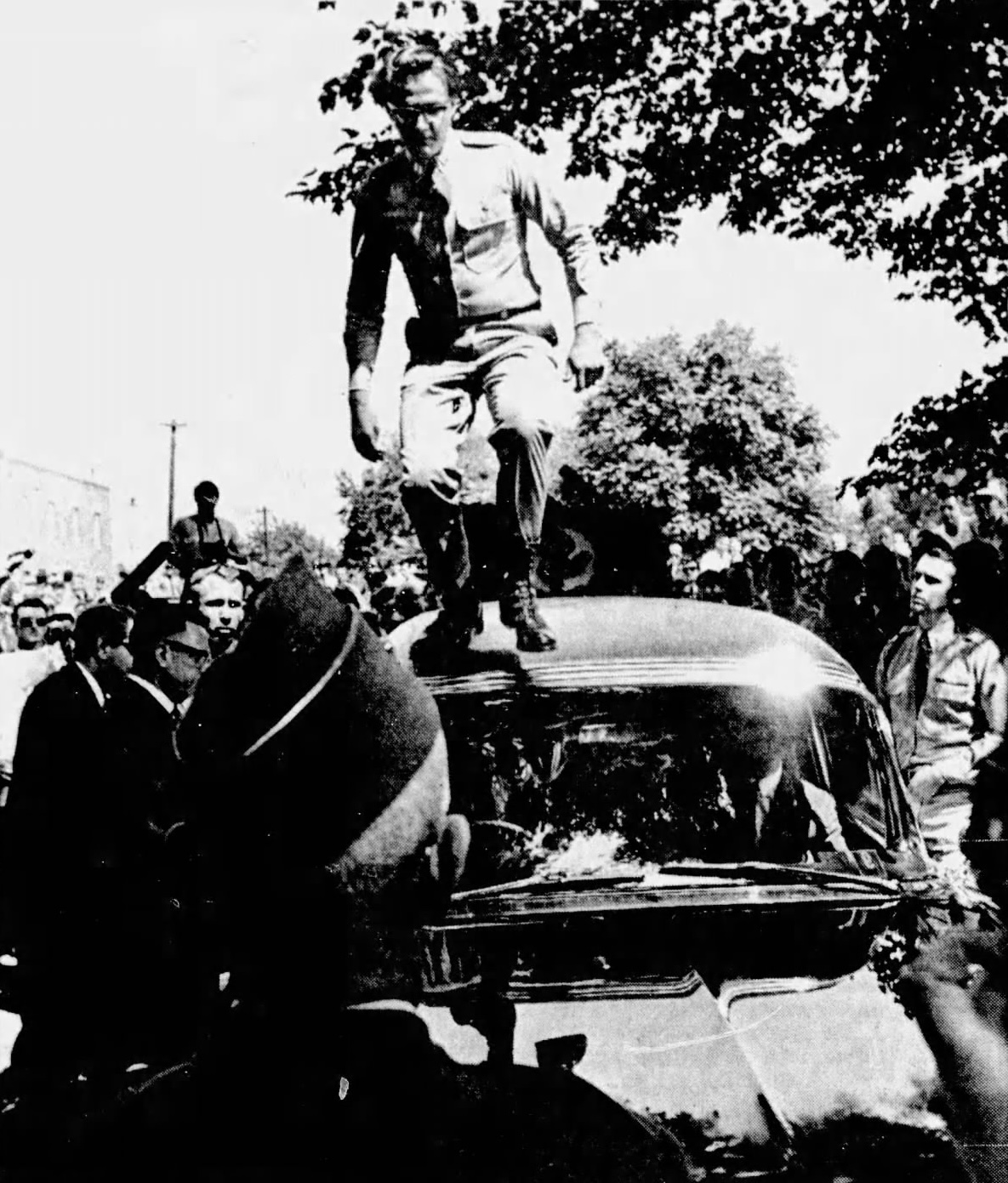
NSWPP member leaps on top of a car during the funeral

When Rockwell's body was released for burial following the autopsy, there was initially a conflict between Rockwell's family and Koehl, the second in command at NSWPP, over possession of the body. Rockwell's family wanted a private family burial in Southport Island, Maine, while Koehl wanted an elaborate funeral to act as a publicity piece for the party. Koehl initially requested that Rockwell be buried in Arlington National Cemetery in Nazi uniform, infuriating Rockwell's brother Bobby, who characterized their actions as "disgusting exhibition" done by "nitwits".

Bobby took legal action to claim the body, while Koehl moved to establish control over Rockwell's body as specified in his will. Koehl threatened to surround the home of Rockwell's mother (who lived in a Jewish area) with Nazis to "mourn". As a result of this threat, Koehl won out, and Rockwell's family gave up their claims by August 27. Bobby noted to the press that "it was unlikely any member of the family would attend the services".

Federal officials approved a military burial at Culpeper National Cemetery, Rockwell being an honorably discharged veteran. They demanded that no mourners display Nazi insignias and rejected the party's request that there be a military honor guard that was "all-Caucasian". However, they allowed Rockwell to be buried in a Nazi uniform. The funeral commenced on August 29, and with it a uniformed Nazi funeral procession. When they arrived, the entrance to the cemetery was blocked by local, state, and military police flown in by helicopter.

The superintendent who ran the cemetery explained to Koehl the ruling, and asked that his men take off their swastikas so they could enter. They refused, and both groups waited for the other to stand down for several hours. During the standoff, a car in the procession was nearly run over by a freight train. When a member of the army on standby broke ranks and defected to the Nazi side, he was immediately arrested. As a result, a member of the NSWPP jumped onto the hearse, before he lunged at the military police and was arrested. More neo-Nazis also jumped at the military police, and were arrested. The military withdrew their approval to have him buried; the Nazis booed, and Koehl had them return to Arlington with the hearse. The next day, Rockwell's body was smuggled out of the funeral home and was secretly cremated by Koehl.

In February 1968, Koehl applied to have Rockwell's remains properly interred in a national cemetery. This time, it was refused. In 2017, Martin Kerr, the leader of the group that the NSWPP became, said they still had his ashes in an urn, though refused to say its location. The drama over the funeral and Rockwell's body was widely publicized.

== Investigation and legal proceedings ==
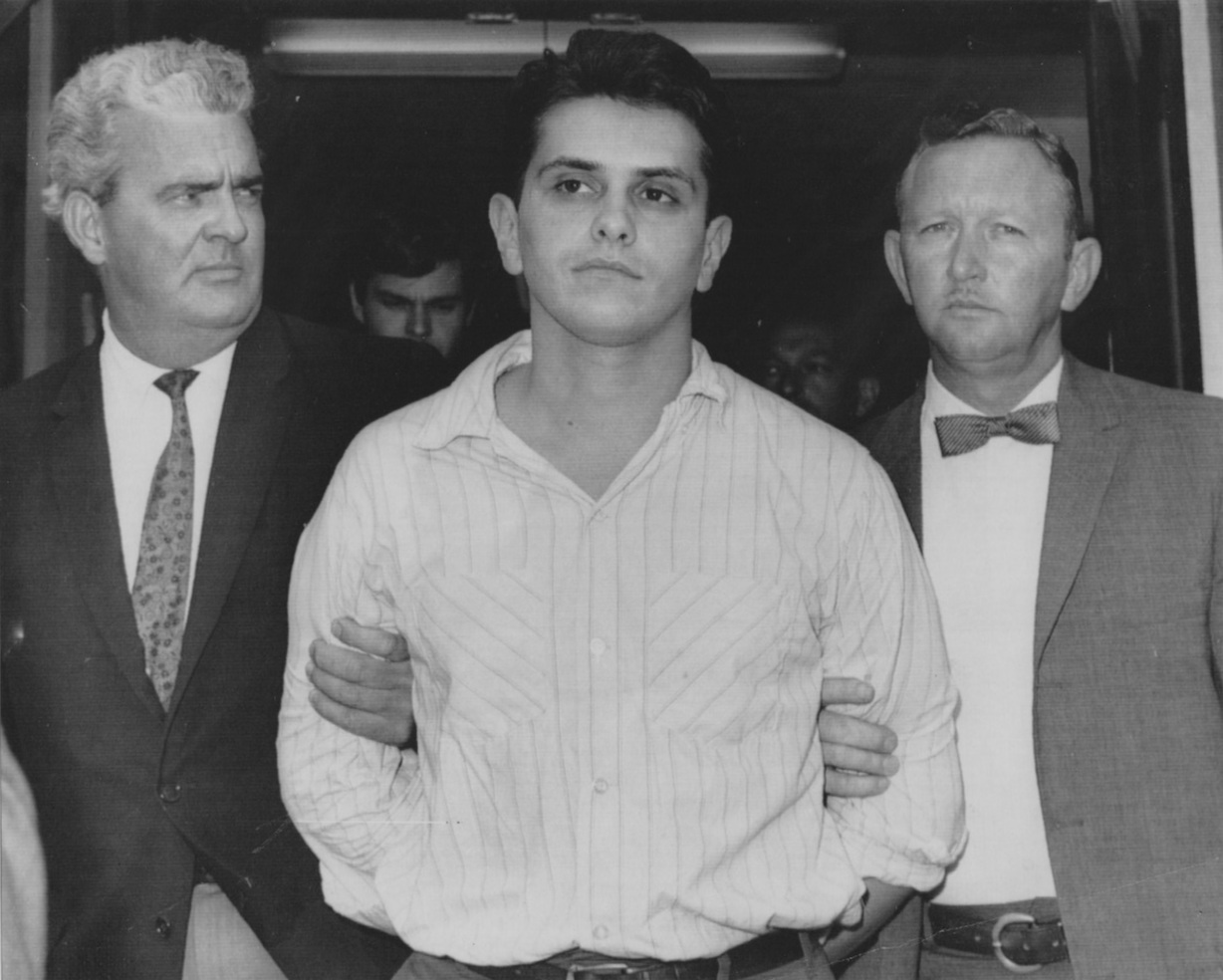
John Patler after his arrest

People from nearby shops immediately rushed to the scene after hearing the gunshots and the sound of Rockwell's car impact. The assassin was heard fleeing the scene. Two local barbers from Tom's Barber Shop, Tom Blackney and Jim Cummings, hearing this, went out back and ran after the shooter. They saw near the end of the store area a man fleeing the scene and running near the side of the building. The two barbers chased after the man and cut off his escape route; the man proceeded to vault over a wall and into a local neighborhood.

Cummings gave an eyewitness description of this man, describing him as wearing dark pants, a dark trench coat, and maybe a yellow shirt. 45 minutes later, Patler was sighted, soaked in sweat, about half mile a away. He was wearing a yellow shirt. Patler was sighted by Arlington Police inspector Raymond Cole who, recognizing him as a member of the NSWPP, called for reinforcements. When more police arrived, they converged on Patler, who again fled into a neighborhood; there, he was caught and arrested at a bus stop, alone. Police searched for the murder weapon along the escape route and ultimately found it between Patler's arrest location and the murder scene, wedged under a rock in a nearby stream in Bon Air Park, underwater. The gun belonged to Robert Allison Lloyd, another member of the ANP; it was a 7.63×25mm Mauser pistol.

Patler was charged with first-degree murder. His bond was set at $50,000, equivalent to $482,784 in 2025. The case was held in a Virginia commonwealth court. Helen Lane, a former member of the county school board, agreed to be his attorney, and he was also represented by attorneys Thomas Harrigan and Thomas Morris. On August 30, 1967, he had his first court appearance, under heavy guard. That day, the police had to subdue an Australian Rockwell sympathizer who jumped at Patler; he was found guilty of contempt of court that day, then deported the next month.

Various possible motives were raised during the trial about why Patler had killed Rockwell. The police and prosecution argued Patler's motive was to get revenge on Rockwell for expelling him. Another possible motive was anger at Rockwell for not defending him from members of the party who insulted his ethnicity, especially Koehl and Pierce. Author Frederick J. Simonelli doubted the latter motive, as Rockwell had actually favored Patler in this dispute. Another theory raised, though not during the trial, was vengeance for Rockwell having an affair with Patler's wife, though Patler said he did not mind. Simonelli suggested that "a variety of events had crippled Patler's mental processes and his capacity for rational thought long before he met Rockwell, and their tumultuous relationship offered no opportunities for Patler to heal."

At the trial, Patler denied he was guilty. Ninety-one witnesses were called. Patler's attorney suggested a perpetrator could instead have been a Nazi angry with the pan-White direction Rockwell was taking the party. His defense attempted to shift blame onto Koehl (who would have had the most to gain in Rockwell's death), as well as advancing other possible motives and perpetrators. They suggested Lloyd may have been the killer, and said Patler would have no way of knowing in advance Rockwell's apparently random decision to visit the laundromat; rather, Koehl was the only person who knew in advance. The police argued this could have been a habit of Rockwell and that Patler, having lived with him for several years, could have predicted it. Patler claimed he had been at the bus stop after a family dispute led him to leave his home, before he decided to return by bus. The prosecution argued Patler had been the perpetrator of the June attempt on Rockwell's life.

The evidence against Patler was circumstantial. Simonelli called the evidence against him "less than compelling", while writer William H. Schmaltz called it "damning". Several gun casings were found on the property of Patler's father in law, where Patler had target shot, and were determined to have been fired by Lloyd's gun. Lloyd claimed he had loaned the gun to Patler in 1964, and when he asked for it back, Patler said someone had stolen it. During the trial, Rockwell's bodyguard testified that he had seen Lloyd with the gun after that point. Evidence relating to shoe prints on the roof was inconclusive; the shoe prints found on the roof were much larger than Patler's, and an examination of his shoes found no roofing gravel or tar that was on the roof.

Patler was found guilty by a jury after thirty hours of deliberation. Patler was convicted of the murder in December 1967, and was sentenced to 20 years in prison, the minimum sentence. Patler appealed his conviction, and was released from prison on $40,000 bond. His murder conviction was upheld by the Supreme Court of Virginia in 1970. With this, his bond was revoked and he was ordered to return to prison to carry out his sentence. He appealed again to the U.S Supreme Court, which unanimously rejected his appeal in May 1972. Patler was paroled in August 1975. Patler violated his parole terms a year later and spent six more years in prison. He was released when his sentence was up. Patler later denounced neo-Nazism and changed his last name back to Patsalos.

== Conspiracy theories ==
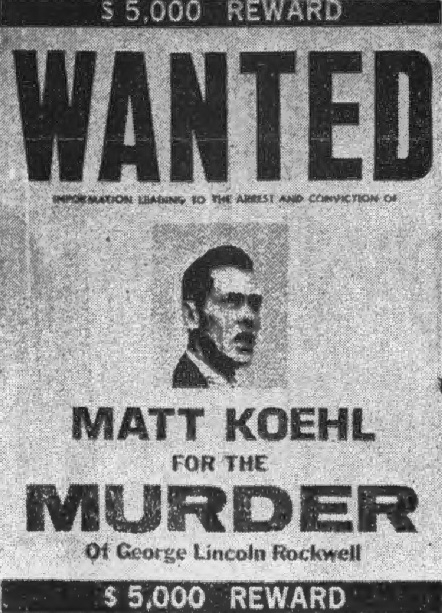
A poster produced by other neo-Nazis accusing Matt Koehl, Rockwell's successor, of being responsible for the assassination

There is no evidence for anyone being the culprit besides Patler, who was ultimately convicted of the murder. Numerous theories emerged among his followers about other possible culprits, and his conviction did not stem other theories. However, most members agreed that Patler had killed Rockwell, though some believed it was part of a coup. In a 1970 article, Patsalos said, "I think [members of the National Socialist White People's Party are] always watching me ... so I never go any place without looking behind me", along with claiming "I think one of them may be the guy who really killed Rockwell". Patler has never admitted guilt in the crime.

=== Jewish conspiracy ===
A few of Rockwell's followers and associates claimed baselessly in the aftermath of his death that there was a Jewish conspiracy to kill him, because, they claimed, he was the only antisemite who may actually take power. Many of these conspiracies involved the Anti-Defamation League. There is no evidence for any of this, and by this time Rockwell had ceased to be an actual threat to the Jewish community. Simonelli argued that Rockwell in some ways helped their cause, because as a "visible and vocal symbol of anti-Semitic extremism, Rockwell had value as a beacon around which the Jewish community could be mobilized", increasing Jewish engagement in ADL activities. Though the idea of a Jewish conspiracy did have some appeal to Rockwell's followers, very few of his followers actually believed it.

Allen was one promoter of this theory, and organized the John Patler Defense Fund, developing the idea that either the killing of Rockwell or at least the blame on Patler was the result of a Jewish conspiracy by the Anti-Defamation League, and that they had blamed it on one of his followers to discredit the Nazis. Allen said he initially agreed with the conclusion that Patler was the killer but came to believe there was a Jewish conspiracy against the party that blamed it on the members. Allen's claims may have all been a deflection campaign suggested by former ANP member Seth Ryan at a meeting of members of his party that day. Ryan hated Patler, but the Black Muslim movement in the United States had faced a great amount of embarrassment when Malcolm X was killed by one of their own, and given the situation, the neo-Nazis instead may have wanted to avoid the same situation deflect this onto the people they viewed as enemies, and so made up a conspiracy they did not actually believe in, whether Patler was actually the killer or not.

=== Neo-Nazi conspiracy ===
The "triumvirate"

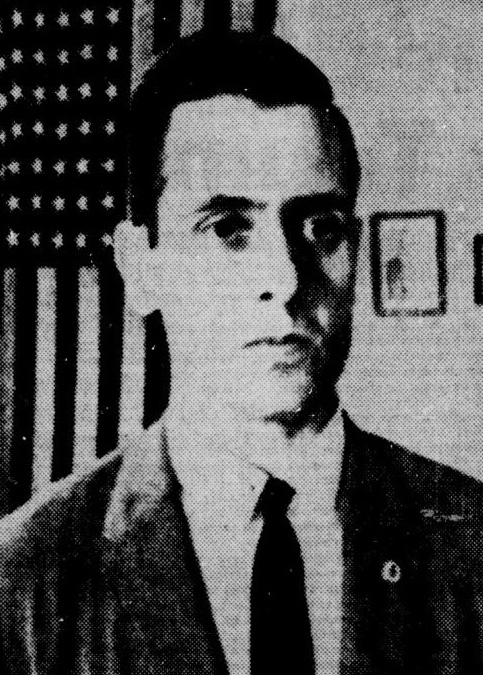
Matt Koehl in 1967

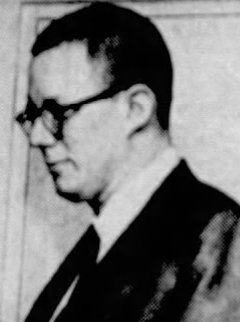
William Luther Pierce in 1970

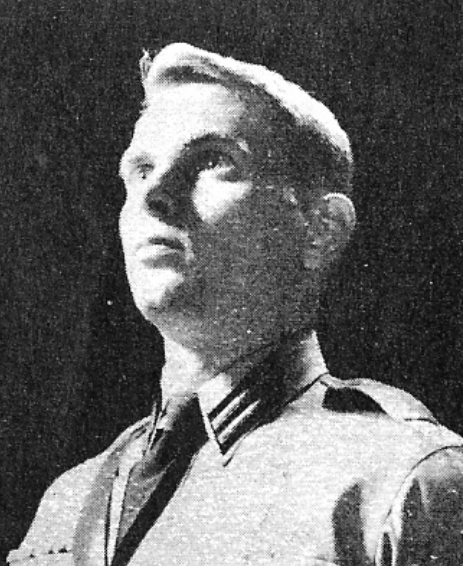
Robert Allison Lloyd in 1963

Another conspiracy theory proposed by some higher ranking members of the neo-Nazi movement, particularly those who were close to Rockwell, was that the murder had been orchestrated by other members of the NSWPP as part of a coup. Blame was placed on three members of the group: Koehl, William Luther Pierce, and Lloyd.

The conspiracy connects this to the dispute between Koehl and Rockwell over Rockwell wanting to take the party in a less explicitly Nazi direction and expand the group's focus to White people who were not Germanic. Koehl hated these changes. The day before the murder, Rockwell got into an argument with the three men. One eyewitness claimed that Rockwell locked the three men out of their offices and said he would expel them. According to this theory, Koehl orchestrated the killing, Lloyd had assisted as a weapons expert, and Pierce was involved in some fashion; Patler, who all three men greatly disliked, was then framed. After Rockwell was murdered, all three men functioned as leaders of the NSWPP, as a "triumvirate", for a time. Lloyd had been dismissed from his position in 1966, but was reinstated as deputy after Rockwell's death.

Rockwell's secretary and mistress Barbara von Goetz initially believed in Patler's guilt, but by early 1968, after actions by Koehl to push her out of the group, she became convinced that the three men had ordered Rockwell's murder and framed Patler to seize control of the party. She expressed this to Rockwell's mother, Claire Schade, and alleged that other higher-ups in the group agreed with her; she left the group later that year. Francis Joseph Smith, Rockwell's personal bodyguard, investigated on his own (having promised Rockwell he would do so if he was ever assassinated) and concluded the same, that Koehl, Pierce, and Lloyd had orchestrated Rockwell's murder. Smith claimed the murder was carried out by ANP member Christopher Vidnjevich, who also hated the changes in the party and was known to be very violent. As a result of Smith making this claim, Smith and Vidnjevich later engaged in a shootout with each other in rural Maine, which they both survived. Smith ceased further investigation after the shootout, and any allegations of anyone but Patler's involvement in Rockwell's death are unproven. A 1968 letter by a pseudonymous neo-Nazi strongly insinuated that Koehl was responsible for the murder; Harold Covington, who hated Koehl, distributed this letter in later decades, and some spread posters that said Koehl was "Wanted for Murder".

== Legacy ==
Rockwell's death had a serious impact on the neo-Nazi movement. He was seen as a martyr by other neo-Nazis. The neo-Nazi James Mason, the author of the book Siege, declared later that the neo-Nazi movement was "lost when we lost him [...] [we] carried on in his absence as though we expected his eventual return. As it turned out, no one had the vaguest idea of what to do or how to do it." Rockwell continues to be an extremely influential figure among the neo-Nazi movement. After his death, the neo-Nazi movement in America ideologically diversified, with a contingent that began to advocate for guerilla warfare and violent attacks; while these and other ideas that rose after his death already existed, the vacuum caused by his death gave them increased prominence.

Rockwell's death effectively ended his party, and decentralized the neo-Nazi movement as a whole, with large shifts in tactics and ideology. Koehl was elected as leader and took over leadership of the NSWPP in the aftermath. Koehl was well-versed in neo-Nazi ideas but lacked leadership ability. He was known for his extremely rigid leadership strategy which he refused to alter from the classical fascist strategy in any way. Less than six months after Rockwell's death, Allen called Koehl a "robot" and said, "the only reason he leads the party now is because everyone else left is even dumber than him". Academic Jeffrey Kaplan wrote of Koehl's leadership ability that:

Koehl thus appeared to outside observers to work on two concurrent tracks: a highly successful effort to anger and alienate the old guard while simultaneously leaving the new recruits with such a bad taste in their mouths that many left the movement, and others became lifelong enemies of the new Commander. It was by all accounts a singular performance. The roster of those harried from the National Socialist White People's Party reads like a virtual "Who's Who" of American National Socialism. William Pierce, Harold Covington, Joseph Tommasi, James Warner, Ricky Cooper, James Mason—the list of victims of Koehl-era purges and angry resignations could go on for pages.

Due to Koehl's decisions as leader, the NSWPP underwent numerous schisms which became established organizations. The movement further decentralized, with numerous smaller groups rather than one large one under Rockwell. One such schism resulted from Pierce. Shortly after Koehl gained power, Pierce and Lloyd, both high-ranking party members, formed an informal "triumvirate". Pierce saw Koehl as an inferior leader and requested that he formalize the arrangement and share power between the three of them. Koehl refused, and in the ensuing struggle Pierce was forced to leave the organization. Now forced out by Koehl, Pierce founded his own neo-Nazi group, the National Alliance. The National Alliance grew to surpass in significance Koehl's NSWPP and became the United States's largest neo-Nazi group by the 1990s. Pierce also authored the racist novel The Turner Diaries.

Other schisms included that of Frank Collin, who formed his own neo-Nazi party, the National Socialist Party of America, and Joseph Tommasi, who founded the National Socialist Liberation Front. In the 1980s, after various controversies, Koehl changed the party's name to the New Order and turned it into a religious esoteric neo-Nazi group. The name of the ANP has since been adopted by several other unrelated neo-Nazi groups that do not directly descend from the original ANP/NSWPP.

According to Sunshine, "the post-Rockwell period of U.S. neo-Nazism is when it developed the basic form it would look like far into the future. The decentralization of neo-Nazism helped lay the ground-work for how the movement's structure unfolded. If Rockwell had lived, or been succeeded by a popular leader, a single major neo-Nazi party may have existed for much longer." Scholar Nicholas Goodrick-Clarke wrote that after Rockwell's death, "the U.S. Nazi movement found a martyr but soon splintered into several small extremist political groups driven by fanaticism, paranoia and suspicion."
