= John Patler =

American former neo-Nazi and assassin (born 1938)

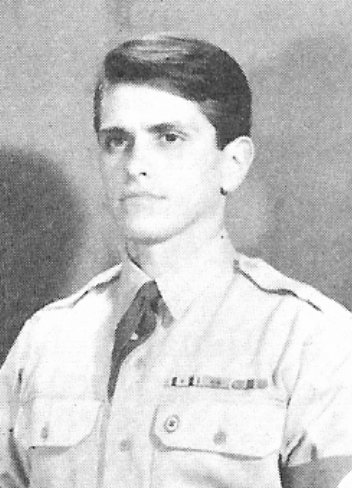
- Patler in 1963
- Born: John Christ Patsalos; January 6, 1938 (age 88); New York City, U.S.
- Political party: American Nazi Party (formerly)
- Spouses: Erika von Gundlach (divorced) Alice Evrin (m. 1966)
- Children: 4
- Status: Released
- Motive: Revenge
- Conviction: First degree murder
- Penalty: 20 years imprisonment

Details
- Victims: George Lincoln Rockwell, 49
- Date: August 25, 1967
- Country: United States
- Location: Arlington County, Virginia

John Christ Patsalos (born January 6, 1938), formerly known as John Patler, is an American former neo-Nazi and cartoonist who was convicted of the August 25, 1967, assassination of American Nazi Party (ANP) leader George Lincoln Rockwell. He was formerly close to Rockwell and worked on producing the ANP's propaganda, particularly cartoons, in their publications.

Born in New York City in 1938, Patsalos had a violent childhood, with his father killing his mother when he was five years old. He was convicted of several crimes in his youth and treated for mental health issues. He expressed antisemitic attitudes by his late teens, and joined the neo-Nazi group the American Nazi Party in 1960. He was an artist and graphic designer for the ANP's periodicals. Patler briefly left the ANP in 1961 and formed a similarly named splinter group, the American National Party, with his close friend Dan Burros, as well as a neo-Nazi magazine, Kill! He and Burros had a falling out a year later and in 1962 Patler returned to the ANP.

Patler's ethnic Greek heritage caused some strife within the party and contributed to a minor schism between those neo-Nazis who advocated a more expansive idea of "master race", and the "Hitler purists" who viewed this as heretical. Patler idolized Rockwell but also blamed him for the problems in Patler's life caused by his adherence to neo-Nazism. Rockwell kicked him out of the party in March 1967 for his instability and for causing division. Patler murdered Rockwell in August of that year, and received a sentence of 20 years in prison for first degree murder. He was paroled in 1975, though he was returned to prison after violating his parole. He later left the neo-Nazi movement.

== Early life ==
John Christ Patsalos was born in New York City on January 6, 1938. His father, Christ Patsalos, was a Greek immigrant, while his mother Athena Patsalos (née Mavroglan) was ethnically Greek but born in New York. The elder Patsalos was in his forties, while Mavroglan was newly 20 when they married. Patsalos's younger brother, George, was born in 1939. His childhood was violent and his father was regularly antisemitic. When Patsalos was five, in 1943, his father shot and killed his mother at their home, believing she was flirting with other men. His father was convicted of manslaughter. His children were put in their maternal grandmother's custody. His father was released on parole after less than 10 years. Shortly after, Patsalos's grandmother died, after which Christ Patsalos reclaimed custody of his children. Patsalos had grown to despise his father, and after moving in with him turned to a series of petty crimes and acts of destruction.

After Patsalos was convicted for car theft, he was put on probation; after violating it he was remanded by the juvenile court to the Morrisania Hospital Mental Hygiene Clinic due to a failure to socially adjust and for being a "chronic truant". When he was evaluated his caseworker noted his antisemitism and "tense and sullen" mood. He was diagnosed as paranoid, and at the age of 18 in 1956 a psychiatrist noted down in his file that he was a "potential murderer". Patsalos received court-mandated outpatient treatment and was observed. By the next year the same psychiatrist confirmed the diagnosis of paranoia, delusions and observation of violent tendencies and said his state had actually deteriorated; he was noted as a poor candidate for outpatient psychotherapy and was recommended for inpatient care at the Bellevue state mental hospital; however the same psychiatrist contrarily said he was seeing a psychiatrist and was improving. The next year he stopped showing up to his appointments, and as the hospital lacked the resources to enforce it, his case was closed.

== Politics ==
By 1956, he often expressed antisemitic attitudes, believing that the United States was controlled by Jews and expressing that Adolf Hitler had been right in his genocide of them. One psychiatrist quoted him as having said: "I go to Church every Sunday morning and fight the Jews." He joined DeWest Hooker's neo-Nazi National Youth League. Patsalos later said Hooker was his idol; to him, he was a father figure, and he adopted many of his antisemitic beliefs. Through Hooker, he met in 1958 George Lincoln Rockwell, with whom he became friends. His NYL membership resulted in several instances of criminal action.

As part of the NYL he was arrested for criminal libel, and when he faced possibly being tried as an adult and having his probation revoked, he was given the alternative option of joining the U.S. Marine Corps in 1958. While undergoing basic training at Camp Lejeune, his father died. He was briefly associated with the neo-Nazi National Renaissance Party.

=== American Nazi Party ===
While stationed in Quantico, Virginia in 1960, Patsalos rekindled his friendship with Rockwell, and joined his American Nazi Party. Close to the party's headquarters in Arlington, he regularly attended the ANP's rallies. He changed his surname to Patler the same year to make it sound more Anglo-Saxon, or more like Hitler. Rockwell liked Patler's artistic abilities as a cartoonist and graphic designer, which he thought were useful; he was also flattered by Patler's extreme loyalty to him. In summer of that year Patler was honorably discharged from the marines due to his association with the group. He married Erika von Gundlach, a German-American woman, and had two sons with her. He named one of their sons after Nazi martyr Horst Wessel.

Within the ANP, Patler was nicknamed "Animal Trainer" for his ability to get even the worst members of the group to do what he wanted; he was known for forming cliques within the movement and secret alliances. According to Rockwell biographer William H. Schmaltz "one was either with him or against him". When Patler joined the ANP, he became close friends with fellow neo-Nazi Dan Burros, who was impressed by his fighting and printing skills. After Patler became jealous that the ANP's National Socialist Bulletin was edited by James K. Warner, they both asked Rockwell to take control of the magazine, which failed but incensed Warner. Both Patler and Burros went to the Anti-Defamation League headquarters on July 26, 1960, where they asked for copies of the ADL Bulletin and placed a swastika sticker in the elevator. A member of the ADL called the police and a warrant was issued for their arrest for defacing the ADL's private property.

After Rockwell was briefly involuntarily committed to a psychiatric hospital, Patler, Burros, and Roger Foss all picketed the White House advocating for him to be freed. Patler and Burros were arrested due to the warrant over the ADL headquarters vandalism when they tried to leave, and were imprisoned. While in jail, Patler threatened to rat the other members out to the ADL and get them put in prison if the group did not pay their bond. Patler's wife ultimately raised bail from a Jewish bondsman. Rockwell was released from the psychiatric hospital after 10 days, and then suspended both Patler and Burros until the outcome of their trial. He then reinstated them due to his conviction in their innocence. Come their trial September 20, they were found guilty and sentenced by a jury to an $100 fine or a 10 day jail sentence, both choosing the fine. Patler appealed but this was rejected. In January 1961, Patler went with Rockwell while they picketed the movie Exodus.

On May 10, 1961, Patler, Rockwell, and eight others were arrested on charges of disturbing the peace in New Orleans after once more trying to picket the movie Exodus. In June 1961, all ten men were found guilty. Patler was sentenced to 45 days in jail and fined $150. That month, he and Burros travelled together in the ANP's Hate Bus protesting the Freedom Riders.

=== American National Party and Kill! ===
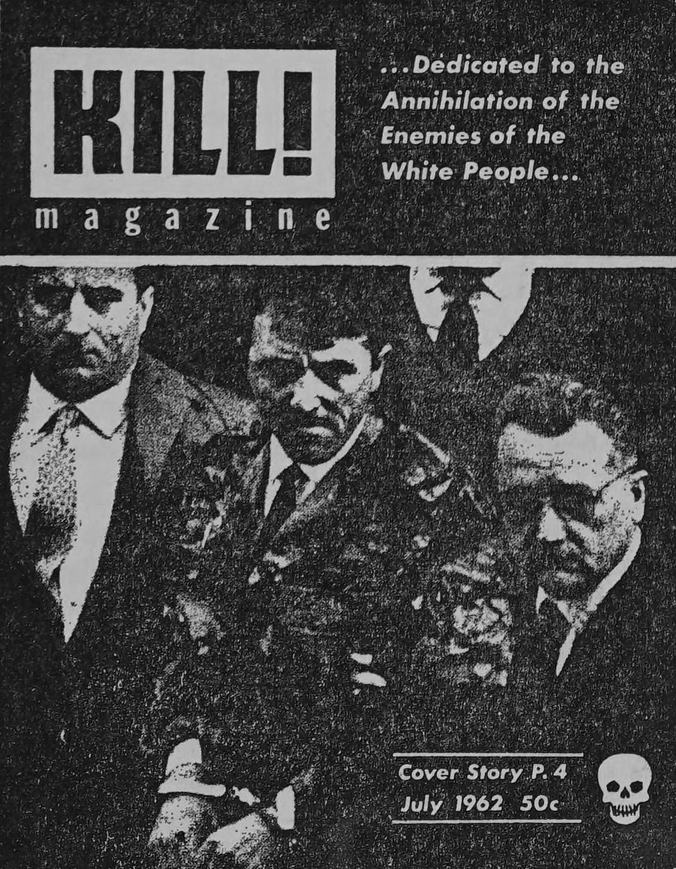
Cover of the July 1962 issue of Burros and Patler's Kill! Magazine

Both Burros and Patler caused unity problems in the ANP in 1961, due to what Rockwell biographer William H. Schmaltz described as their "continual scheming". Ralph Grandinetti, Patler, and Burros constantly accused other members of being spies for the Jews; Foss grew to dislike the three as a result. Patler and Burros later got Foss demoted over a disciplinary infraction, leading to him leaving headquarters. Patler became the editor of the National Socialist Bulletin. Following an incident over the Official Stormtrooper's Manual, with Burros and Patler editing it in a manner Rockwell viewed as overly self-promotional, they left the party in November.

Burros and Patler moved to New York City, where they launched a magazine called Kill! which was "dedicated to the annihilation of the enemies of the white people". The magazine was an outlet for attacking other members of the movement. Alongside Kill! the two founded their own splinter group, the American National Party. Their party was functionally a duplicate of the ANP, and never had more than a few members. In New York City Patler's marriage degraded and they divorced. Von Gundlach took custody of their children.

In 1962, as part of a demonstration held by the American National Party, Patler was arrested for picketing an integration rally in New Jersey. Patler was convicted and sentenced to 10 days in jail; while in jail he went on hunger strike. Burros and Patler had a falling out when Burros decided to watch football instead of picketing Eleanor Roosevelt's funeral with him. Patler protested alone, was arrested, and spent 90 days in jail. Their ANP dissolved less than a year after it had been created and the magazine ended after four issues; the whole last issue, written by Patler, proclaimed that Rockwell was right and said the American National Party was dissolved. Burros stayed in New York, while Patler returned to the American Nazi Party in early 1963. Burros later killed himself in 1965 when The New York Times revealed that he was Jewish.

=== Return to Rockwell's party ===
Rockwell had secretly been negotiating with other ANP members about Patler's rejoining; Foss, Seth Ryan, and Ralph Forbes all strongly opposed his rejoining. Rockwell initially worried that Patler rejoining would cause members to leave. A meeting was held where Patler admitted that his 1961 charge against Foss was a lie, and Rockwell argued that Patler's benefits to the party outweighed his issues. Rockwell persuaded several newer members (who did not know Patler) to vote to bring him back, which was accepted. In response to the result, Foss screamed at Rockwell, accused the two of being in a homosexual relationship and Rockwell of being treacherous. Both Foss and Forbes immediately resigned despite Rockwell's protests. When he returned to Virginia, Patler served as Rockwell's aide in a variety of positions. Patler met 19-year-old Alice Evrin in 1964, marrying her two years later.

Patler began work on their propaganda for the group's magazines, including The Rockwell Report and The Stormtrooper. He edited the latter publication and drew cartoons. In 1964 Patler entered the House of Representatives dressed in blackface and a leopard skin to mock the pro-civil rights Mississippi Freedom Democratic Party, yelling "I's de Mississippi delegation!" In 1965, he and Rockwell collaborated on a comic book called The Diary of Ann Fink, designed to mock The Diary of Anne Frank; the illustrations were done by both men. The comic denies the Holocaust, includes photographs of Holocaust victims, and features captions mocking the subjects. He later stopped the printing of this on the grounds the group was "maturing". He, Rockwell, and numerous Klansmen met for a rally in Marquette Park in Chicago in August 1966.

Patler's ethnic Greek heritage and non-Nordic appearance led to criticism of his presence in the party by other neo-Nazis, especially Matt Koehl. Rockwell liked Patler, whose presence he defended by arguing for a more expanded idea of master race. Koehl and the members who agreed with him viewed this change as heretical, leading to a minor schism between the two groups: Koehl's, which adhered to Hitler's original ideas, and Rockwell's "White Unity" faction, which abandoned the specific fixation on Nordic and Germanic identity. The ANP was already small, and wishing to not further the schism Rockwell told Patler to keep himself unobtrusive and not disturb the "Hitler purists", but refused to go back on this change despite Koehl's objections, and told Patler that they would further the "White Unity" movement in the form of "White Power" instead of factionalism; this ultimately prevailed. Patler's presence resulted in several changes to the party in early 1967, including an Americanization of its imagery and a change in name to the National Socialist White People's Party (NSWPP). These changes came as a result of Patler and were objected to by Koehl.

=== Conflict with Rockwell ===
A contemporary journalist said Patler "loved Rockwell passionately, drawn to him by an irrational loyalty", while Frederick J. Simonelli said "Rockwell's dominant personality consumed John Patler's identity". They began to conflict. Rockwell once criticized Patler for allegedly calling the other members of the party "blue-eyed devils". Patler claimed this was him quoting a statement from the Nation of Islam leader Elijah Muhammad, because he thought the quote was funny. He also criticized Rockwell for alleged financial irresponsibility.

From 1966 to 1967, Patler went to and from the party, experiencing mood swings, fighting with other neo-Nazis and believing himself the subject of various plots. He wrote several letters to Rockwell that oscillated between hatred and begging for his forgiveness. Patler viewed Rockwell as a father figure, but blamed him for the problems in his life, including his abandonment of his Greek identity to fit the party's ideal and the failure of his first marriage. A psychiatrist had previously noted him as having probable "repressed homosexuality"; in several of his final letters to Rockwell, he described him as one would a romantic partner. In early 1967, he created his final issue of The Stormtrooper, "The Untold Story of Benito Mussolini". It was effectively a farewell issue with Patler going over his own past and the past of the party. Patler and Evrin had two children together; after which he became more self-confident and questioned his position in the group. Hating the separation from his family, in March 1967, he left his post in Spotsylvania and returned to Arlington. Afterwards, Rockwell had the locks on his door cut off and Patler's possessions moved to Arlington.

Afterwards, Rockwell wrote a discharge letter against Patler, including that he was guilty of "abandoning his post, gross insubordination and insulting conduct to superiors, neglect of duties, promotion of dissension among the ranks, promotion of distrust by non-Nordic members of the party, and usurpation of authority". He was then immediately dismissed. Rockwell delegated this to Koehl instead of doing it himself. In addition, Rockwell made his stormtroopers examine Patler's property to ensure he did not leave with theirs. Patler spent the rest of the spring enraged over his treatment, writing letters disavowing Rockwell and the ANP, before again returning to begging for his forgiveness. In his last letter to Rockwell, Patler wrote: "I don't think there are two people on earth who think and feel the same as we do. ... You are a very important part of my life. I need you as much as you need me. Without you there is no future". Later, in 1972, he said of their relationship:

I worshipped Rockwell and I loved him dearly. There seemed to be practically nothing I would not do for him. To me, he was everything. I loved him like a father and he loved me like his son.

== Assassination of Rockwell and legal proceedings ==
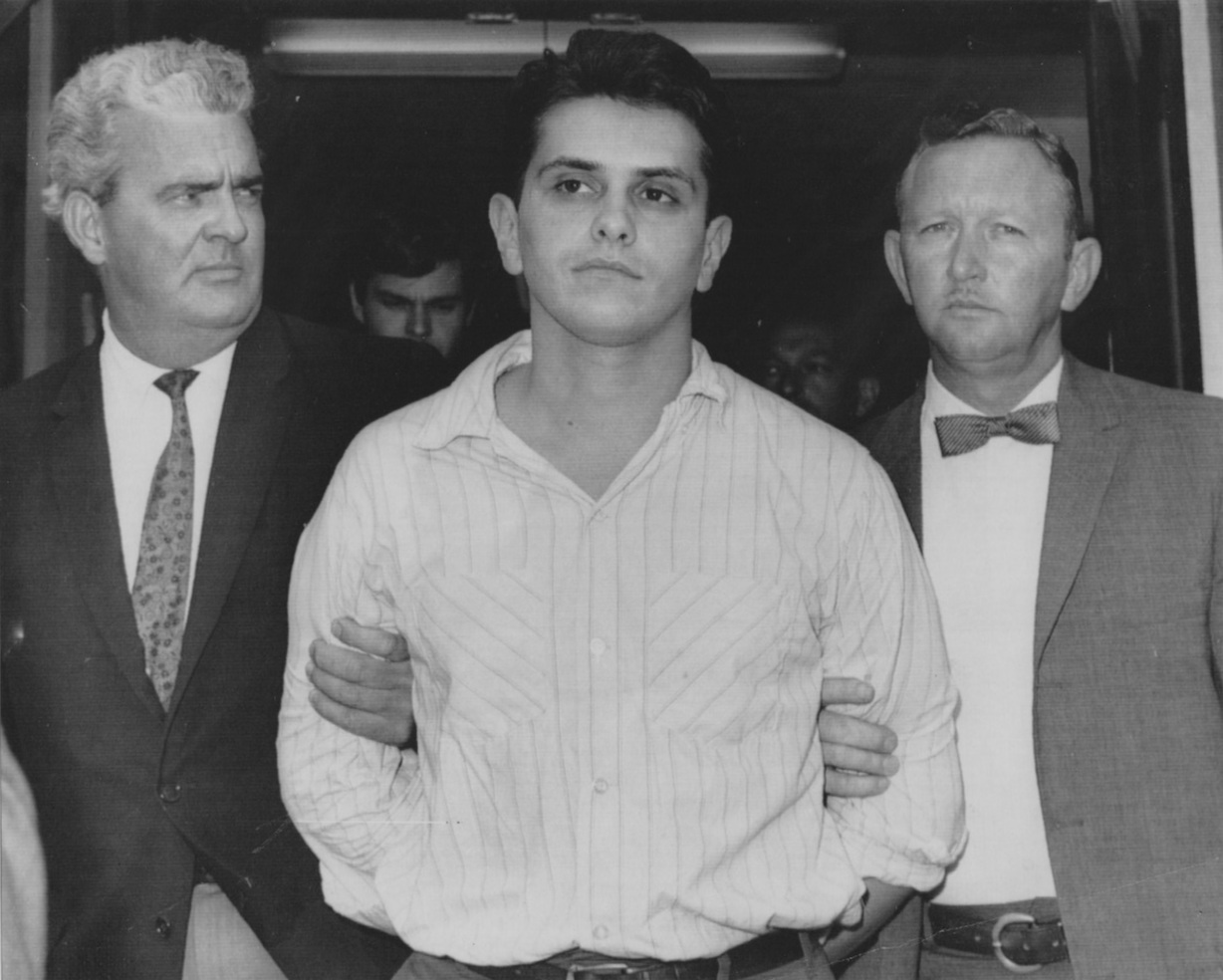
Patler after his arrest

On August 25, 1967, Rockwell was shot and killed by Patler while seated in his car, parked in front of a laundromat in Arlington, Virginia. Rockwell was shot with a 7.63 mm broomhandle Mauser pistol. Patler was arrested half an hour later, about a mile (1.5 km) from the scene of the shooting.

The police and prosecution argued Patler's motive was to get revenge on Rockwell for expelling him. Another possible motive was anger at Rockwell for not defending him from members of the party who insulted his ethnicity, especially Koehl and Pierce. Frederick J. Simonelli, author of a biography of Rockwell, doubted the latter motive, as Rockwell had actually favored Patler in this dispute. Another theory was vengeance for Rockwell having an affair with Patler's wife, though this was never mentioned at the trial, and after Patler learned of the affair he sent Rockwell a letter telling him he was fine with it. The prosecution also argued he had been the perpetrator of a prior assassination attempt in June of that year.

Despite the evidence, several members of the far-right refused to believe that Patler had killed him, though most did. The evidence against him was primarily circumstantial. Despite a few unsubstantiated rumors about different members of the party organizing the murder and Patler's maintaining of his own innocence, Patler was convicted of first degree murder on December 16, 1967. The prosecutor requested a death sentence, but the jury recommended 20 years. Patler was sentenced to 20 years in prison in December 1967 by Arlington Circuit Court Judge Charles Russell.

Shortly after being convicted, Patler appealed his murder conviction to the Supreme Court of Virginia and during his appeal process was out on bail. While free, Patler sued a member of the ANP for libel in 1969; the ANP member told the Federal Bureau of Investigation that the gun used in Rockwell's assassination had been stolen by Patler. Patler won the suit and received a $15,000 judgement. Patler's appeal against his murder sentence was unsuccessful, and he was sent to prison in 1970. He continued trying to appeal; in June 1972, the Supreme Court of the United States unanimously turned down an appeal. Patler was paroled in August 1975, having served less than eight years of his sentence. In 1976, he was charged with trespassing and possession of marijuana; his trespassing charge was later dismissed. After violating his parole, he received an additional six-year sentence.

== Later life ==
In 1970, Patsalos was reportedly using his old name again, and contributing to a Spanish-language newspaper called El Pueblo, condemning racism in an editorial. He also described his former racism as being due to his thoughts "that [he] was inferior" and that he was "dark and ugly". In a 1970 article, Patsalos said, "I think [members of the National Socialist White People's Party are] always watching me ... so I never go any place without looking behind me", along with claiming "I think one of them may be the guy who really killed Rockwell". He maintains he did not kill Rockwell.

In the early 1970s, Patsalos attended art classes at Radford College under a study-release program, although in 1975 a temporary ban was imposed on enrollment of prisoners and parolees, after college officials learned who he was, while claiming they did not know about the program. The ACLU disputed the ban, but did not dispute the college's subsequent refusal to give Patsalos a dorm. In 1978, media outlets reported Patsalos was attempting to get a name change back to his original name.

In a 2012 book, Nicholas Patler, the son of Patsalos, recalled his father expressing regret for his time in the American Nazi Party, with him saying "I should have been with Dr. King and the Civil Rights people back then. They were truly my people, not those Nazis." His son Nicholas Patler became a historian and authored a book on the civil rights movement, Jim Crow and the Wilson Administration, in 2004.

In 2017, The Washington Post described Patsalos as a "staunch online defender of Donald Trump". Patsalos praised the marchers at the Unite the Right rally. He refused multiple interview requests from the newspaper.
