= Alvadee Hutton Adams =

American journalist

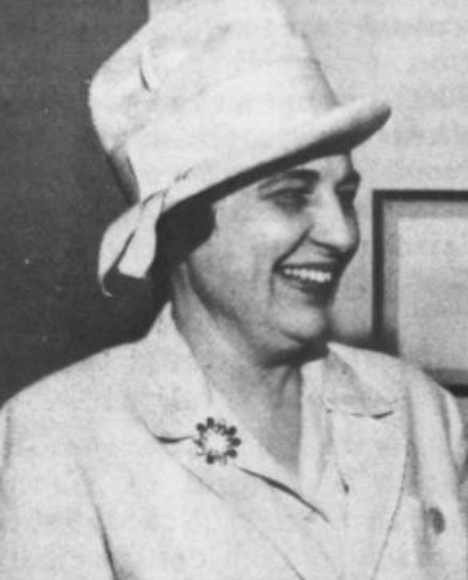
- Alvadee Hutton Adams, from a 1964 publication of the United States Department of State
- Born: Alvadee Eugenia Hutton; June 15, 1917; Forman, North Dakota, U.S.
- Died: August 11, 2003 (aged 86); Mercer Island, Washington, U.S.
- Occupations: Journalist, editor

Alvadee Eugenia Hutton Adams (June 15, 1917 – August 11, 2003) was an American journalist and editor. She was editor of U.S. Lady beginning in 1956, a free monthly magazine for women in the military and military wives.

== Early life and education ==
Hutton was born in Forman, North Dakota, and raised in New Cumberland, Pennsylvania, the daughter of Frank Zinn Hutton and Carrie May Sloat Hutton. Her father was a soil scientist in the lumber industry. She graduated from Temple University in 1940. She earned a master's degree in journalism at Columbia University in 1941. She was later vice-president of the Columbia University Graduate School of Journalism alumni association.

== Career ==
Hutton worked as a waitress on cruise ships during her college years, and became familiar with Latin America from these summer travels. She was awarded a Pulitzer Traveling Fellowship in Journalism to report from Latin America. During the term of her fellowship, she met her husband, fellow journalist John B. Adams.

In 1956, Adams became editor of U.S. Lady magazine, a monthly publication for military women and military wives, published by her husband. In this role, she traveled widely, visiting American military bases and attending international conferences. She was a member of the National Press Club, the Overseas Press Club, and the American Newspaper Women's Club. In her later working life, she was involved in publications for Prince George's County Public Schools in Maryland. She retired in 1979, and moved to the Pacific Northwest to be near family.

== Publications ==
- "The Dog Star and its Unique Companion" (1943)
- "Lepers' Children: Eunice Weaver Spearheads Brazil's Battle Against an Ancient Scourge" (1952)
- "U.S. Wheat Licks Red Propaganda in Pakistan, Nation of 80 Million" (1953)

== Personal life ==
Hutton married John Bucher Adams in 1942, in Rio de Janeiro. They had two daughters, Alice and Abigail, both born in Alexandria, Virginia. Her husband died in 1968, and Adams died in 2003, at the age of 86, in Mercer Island, Washington, from complications of Alzheimer's disease.
