= U.S. Lady =

Defunct women's magazine

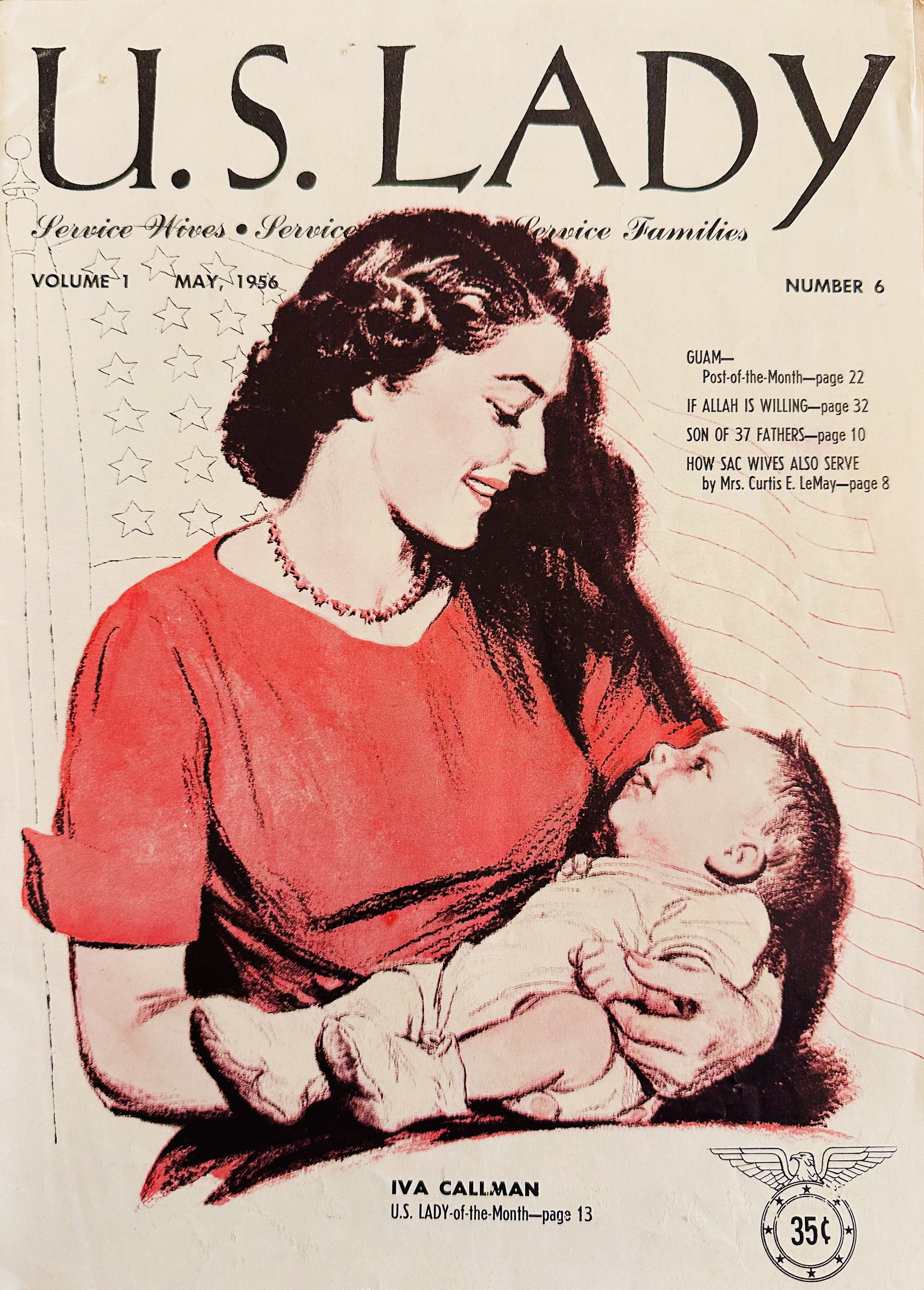
- 1956 cover
- Categories: Women's magazine
- Founder: George Lincoln Rockwell
- First issue: 1955
- Final issue: 1968
- Country: United States
- Language: English
- OCLC: 49575869

U.S. Lady was a free magazine aimed at the wives of men in the U.S. military. It was founded by George Lincoln Rockwell in 1955, later more notorious for his founding of the American Nazi Party, though the magazine was sold by him the year after his founding and the magazine never expressed his views. It was then owned by Alvadee and John Adams, two civilian journalists. It ceased publication in 1968.

== Description ==
It was launched in 1955 by George Lincoln Rockwell in Washington, D.C. as a money-making venture after his discharge from the U.S. Navy Reserve. U.S. Lady vigorously promoted the role of military wives as the unofficial ambassadors in host nations. Due to conflicts with his business partners and financial backers, Rockwell sold the magazine the following year, having published only four issues. U.S. Lady magazine was purchased in 1956 by Alvadee and John Adams, two civilian journalists. It was not an official military publication, but sometimes published material from official military sources.

In 1958, Rockwell founded the American Nazi Party. Subsequent to that, Avandee and John Adams said they knew nothing of the original publisher's extremist views, and they assured readers that Rockwell was not involved with the magazine in any way after its sale. Rockwell's political views had never been espoused in the magazine during his tenure with U.S. Lady; a biographer of Rockwell noted it as an "inadequate" outlet for his beliefs. Rockwell later blamed "the Jews" for taking the magazine from him, and blamed the women on the staff of the magazine for disrupting his control of the magazine.

The magazine ceased publication in 1968.
