= Claire Schade =

American vaudeville actress (1893–1991)

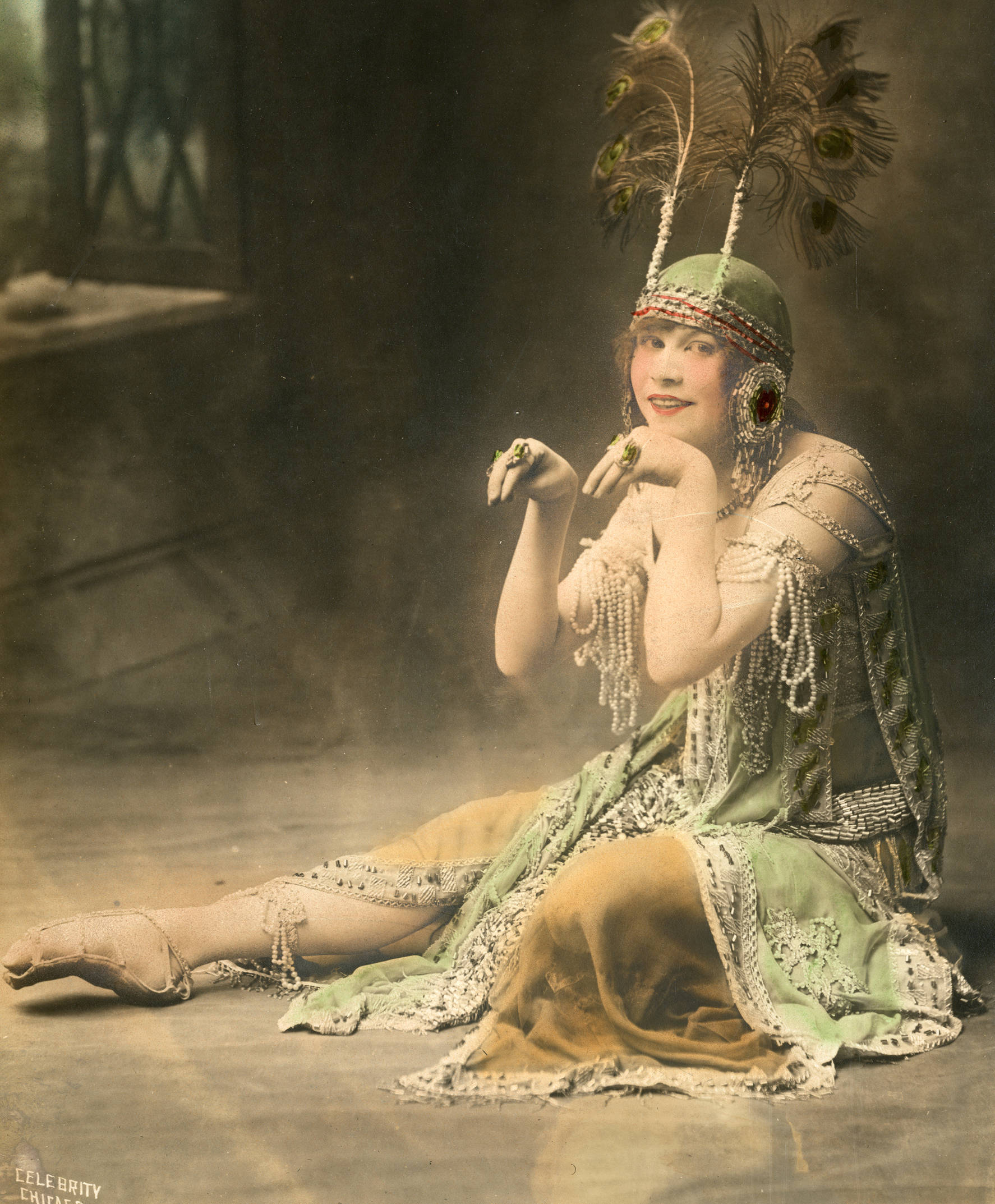
- Schade, pictured 1914
- Born: Claire Antoinette Schade; November 22, 1893; Bloomington, Illinois, U.S.
- Died: April 23, 1991 (aged 97)
- Other names: Claire Schade Rockwell, Claire Shade
- Spouse: George Lovejoy Rockwell (m. 1915; div. 1924)
- Children: 3, including George Lincoln

Claire Antoinette Schade (November 22, 1893 – April 23, 1991) was an American vaudeville actress and toe dancer. Born in Bloomington, Illinois, she left school early, at the age of 9, for her career. She performed in vaudeville as part of her family's act, The Four Schades, which was centered around her; they were known for their skit, "Mistakes Will Happen". The Four Schades was successful in her adolescence but lessened in popularity when she got older. She performed in several theater plays, including "For His Brother's Crime" and "Dreamland". Writer Frederick J. Simonelli described her as "the Shirley Temple of her era". She earned enough as an actress to make a living and had her share of fans, but never achieved celebrity.

In 1915, Schade married fellow vaudeville performer George Lovejoy Rockwell, with whom she had three children. She largely retired from performance in 1918 after the birth of their first child and entirely retired after the birth of their second the next year. They divorced in 1924, though due to a misstep in the legal paperwork were not legally divorced until 1936. Schade moved to Atlantic City, New Jersey, to live with her sister, where she largely raised the children. Her eldest son George Lincoln Rockwell later became a high-profile neo-Nazi and the founder of the American Nazi Party. She was one of the only people in their family who did not cut contact with him. She expressed some sympathy for his views; she financially supported him and may have financially contributed to the American Nazi Party herself.

== Early life ==
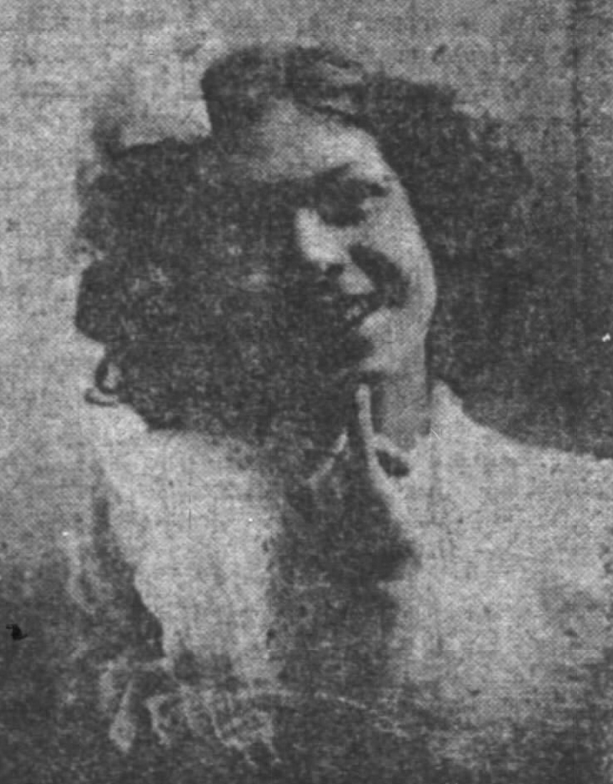
Schade in 1904

Claire Antoinette Schade was born November 22, 1893 in Bloomington, Illinois, to Augustus "Gus" Schade and Corrine Boudreau. Schade was a German immigrant while Boudreau was of French descent. Augustus Schade was the manager of Bloomington's Majestic Theater, the largest performing house in the city. Her father had immigrated from Germany to Bloomington in the 1880s. He was also a freemason. She was the couple's youngest daughter, and had two older sisters, including Arline Schade. She was the cousin of fellow performer L. Orville Boudreau.

Biographers described Schade as "soft-willed" and compliant to the wishes of her father and later, her sister. She began toe dancing as a child; noticing her skill for singing and dancing by the age of six, her father built the family's routine out of it. Schade never received a formal education beyond the age of 9, having left school at that age to pursue her acting career. According to her daughter, she was insecure about this for the rest of her life.

== Career ==
A vaudeville performer, writer Frederick J. Simonelli described her as "the Shirley Temple of her era". She was described by the newspaper The Buffalo Commercial as "the youngest toe dancer in America". Based around her, her father formed an act entitled "The Four Schades", which they took on the road apart from the Majestic Theatre. They had a comedy and musical sketch entitled "Mistakes Will Happen". The newspaper The Scranton Truth praised her performance in this sketch in 1907, saying she had "promise of being a notable entertainer". Discussing the sketch, The Billboard praised her as the "most important" member of the Schades, saying the routine's "comedy is clean and the people clever."

In 1904, she starred in the melodrama "For His Brother's Crime" as Dolly Sterling. Reviews generally praised her performance. The Saint Paul Globe praised her singing and dancing, though criticized the play as a whole as "a sad affair" that lacked common sense. The Brooklyn Daily Eagle said her performance was "excellent", while the Virginia-Pilot said the "wee bit of a soubrette, made a big hit with her song". In 1905, at the age of 11, she acted for the entertainment of poor and sick children in Manhattan's East Side. The Brooklyn Daily Eagle described her performance as "dainty and artistic" and her singing "clever". In 1907, they traveled to Los Angeles, California, to open at its Empire Theatre. When Schade was younger the Four Schades was successful, but became less so by the time she reached adolescence.

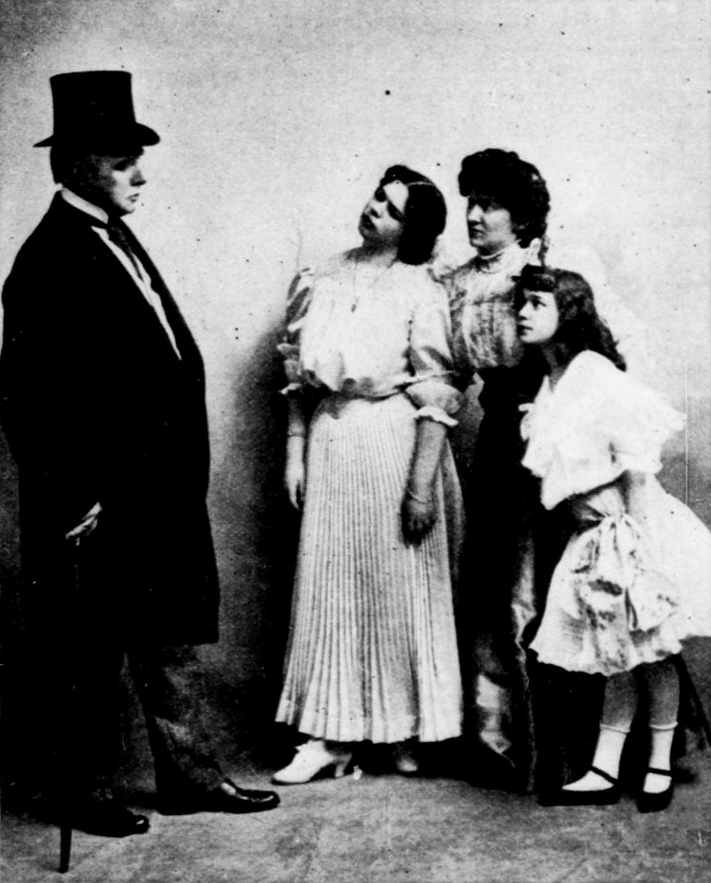
Claire (furthest right) as part of The Four Schades, 1907

In 1914, she starred in "Dreamland" as the Egyptian queen, replacing actress Nina Payne. Her performance was generally praised; Sime Silverman of Variety said her performance attracted the most notice of the female cast; he praised her dancing. The Fort Wayne Journal Gazette praised her singing, while The Houston Chronicle singled her out for her dancing. In 1915, she went to Memphis, Tennessee, to act with the set of Matthews & Shaynes, playing the same Egyptian queen part. That year she appeared with her cousin L. Orville Boudreau doing stunts at a Delta Tau Show at a Masonic Temple. She was acting enough by 1915 to live off of it, though by then had lost hope of being a "star" actor. She was never an especially famous actor but had many admirers in her time.

Through their shared occupation and at her father's theater, in 1915, Schade met fellow vaudeville performer George Lovejoy Rockwell. There is no record of how she felt about their relationship. They married March 14, 1915 in New York City. The couple settled in Bloomington. For the first few years of their marriage both traveled together on the vaudeville circuit. By 1918, she spelled her last name Shade, perhaps due to a public dislike of German spellings. Despite being of German descent, her family was not pro-German during the World War I. Rockwell was rising in prominence at the time of their marriage and was by a few years later one of the highest paid actors of his era and a celebrity. She mostly retired after the birth of their first son, George Lincoln Rockwell, in 1918; he wanted it that way and she complied. She would still initially travel with him to meet some performance arrangements and to fill gaps in programming. They had two more children, Robert in 1919 and Priscilla in 1921. She entirely retired from performance after the birth of their second child.

== Later life and death ==
Schade was a housewife at this time and they began to have marital problems; writer Frederick J. Simonelli described her as "housebound and broken-spirited under Doc’s smothering personality". She tried, unsuccessfully, to fix their marriage. They divorced in 1924, devastating Claire; initially, she did not contest any of his legal demands in court whatsoever. He was sporadic in his alimony and child support payments despite his wealthy lifestyle, resulting in financial problems for Schade. The children mostly lived with Schade and visited Rockwell on occasion. After their divorce in 1924 Schade moved to Atlantic City, New Jersey, to live with her sister Arline, who lived by herself. She became emotionally dependent on Arline, who took over her financial matters; she totally controlled her money and filed various legal actions on her behalf against Rockwell for failing to pay his child support or alimony payments.

Arline despised Rockwell. It was later realized that legally, Rockwell and Schade had not completed the divorce. An interlocutory decree was granted in 1925, but Schade never filed the final divorce paperwork. This was realized 10 years later, in 1935, and resulted in a legal battle upon the realization. He sued her after she declared she did not want to file a final divorce decree, in an effort to make her do so. The case involved US$4,500 (equivalent to $104,406 in 2025) in unpaid back alimony and child support from Rockwell, while Schade withheld a $US$25,000 (equivalent to $580,036 in 2025) insurance policy on Rockwell's life, and also involved Rockwell asking for a lesser alimony payment due to an inability to pay it. Schade wanted the payment increased. The alimony payment was eventually lowered, and Schade agreed to stop withholding the life insurance policy and agree to the complete the divorce. She filed paperwork to that end in April 1936. They maintained no contact.

In addition to her control of Schade's finances, Arline also disciplined Schade's children. Schade's younger son Robert largely avoided serious punishment, but her older son Lincoln, confrontational and reminding Arline of his father, was regularly physically and mentally abused by her from the ages of 6 to 15. Schade attempted to shield Lincoln from Arline's abuse but was largely unsuccessful; she tried to get him to be less confrontational so she would abuse him less, but he refused. Lincoln despised Arline's treatment of his mother, and recalled Schade as "my poor, patient, weak mother", and even decades later was tormented by the abuse and her role in failing to prevent it. Lincoln would later become a neo-Nazi and the founder of the American Nazi Party. While the specifics of her racial views are unknown, letters sent between her and her son suggest she shared his antisemitism to some extent, unlike her ex-husband who hated their son's views and tried to reduce it. By the 1950s, she was living in Brooklyn, New York. In 1958, Lincoln was implicated in the Hebrew Benevolent Congregation Temple bombing, which resulted in him being outed as a neo-Nazi nationally; this greatly disturbed her, as she and the rest of the family (minus her younger son) were unaware of the extent of his radicalization. The family as a whole was traumatized and it harshly damaged the family's reputation.

Despite this conflict, Schade did not abandon him, and they continued to correspond throughout their lives; she may have had some sympathy for his views, once writing to him in a letter that "the people do not deserve you" and telling her son that she was proud of him. She never expressed disapproval of his beliefs or the American Nazi Party's ideas, but rather believed political involvement had a negative effect on his life. Schade also kept in contact with some people in the party, including his mistress Barbara von Goetz. Almost everyone else in his family cut off contact with him due to his neo-Nazi views, with the exception of Schade's daughter Priscilla. Schade occasionally sent Lincoln money for life expenses, which he depended on even to 1963. She may have been a financial contributor to the party itself, though this is uncertain. After the ANP was raided by federal authorities in 1966, von Goetz wrote to Schade reassuring her that unspecified property that belonged to her and files that had her name were not among the taken. What was in these items is unknown. Lincoln was murdered by John Patler, a former member of his own party, in 1967. Schade died April 23, 1991, at the age of 97.
