= São Manoel do Paraná =

Coordinates: 23.4028°S 52.6439°W

- Municipality
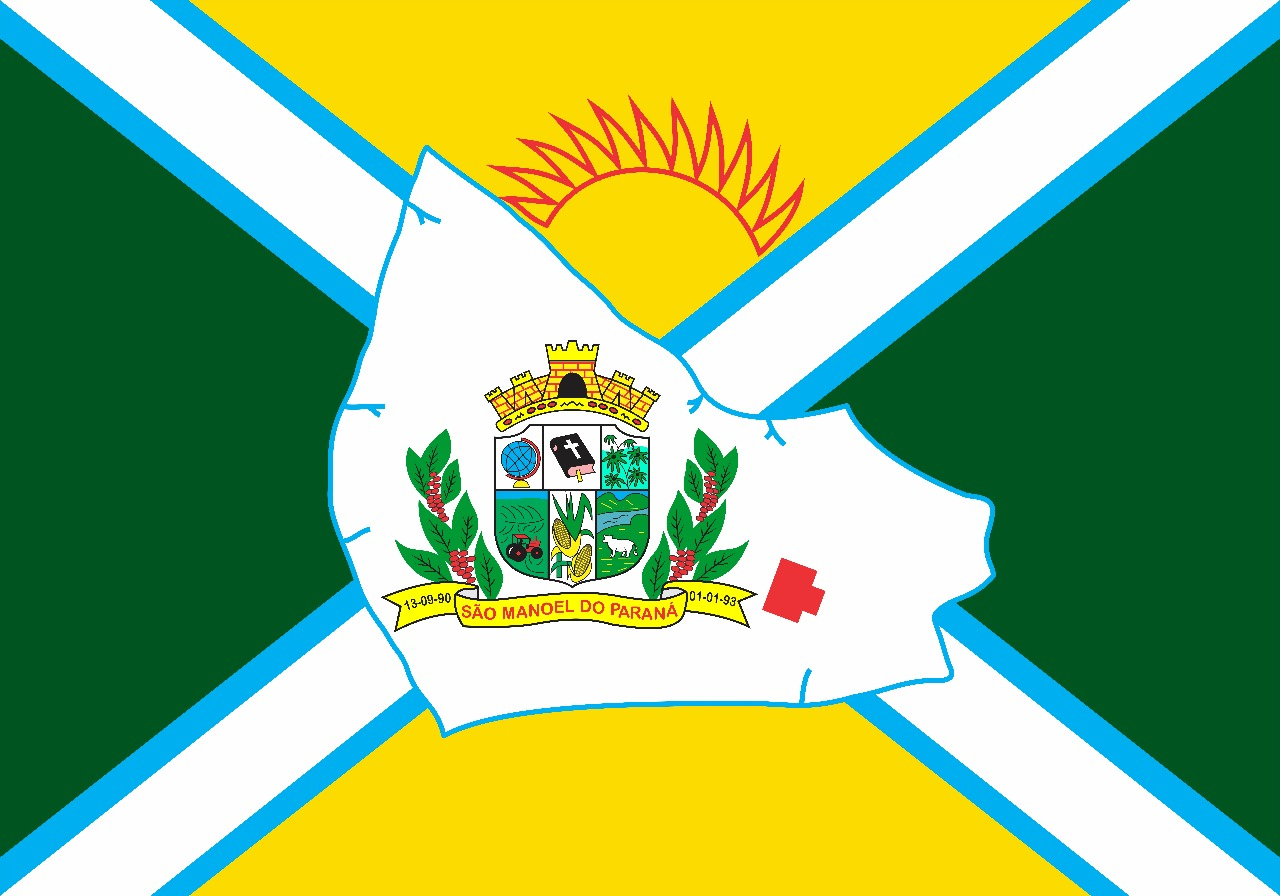
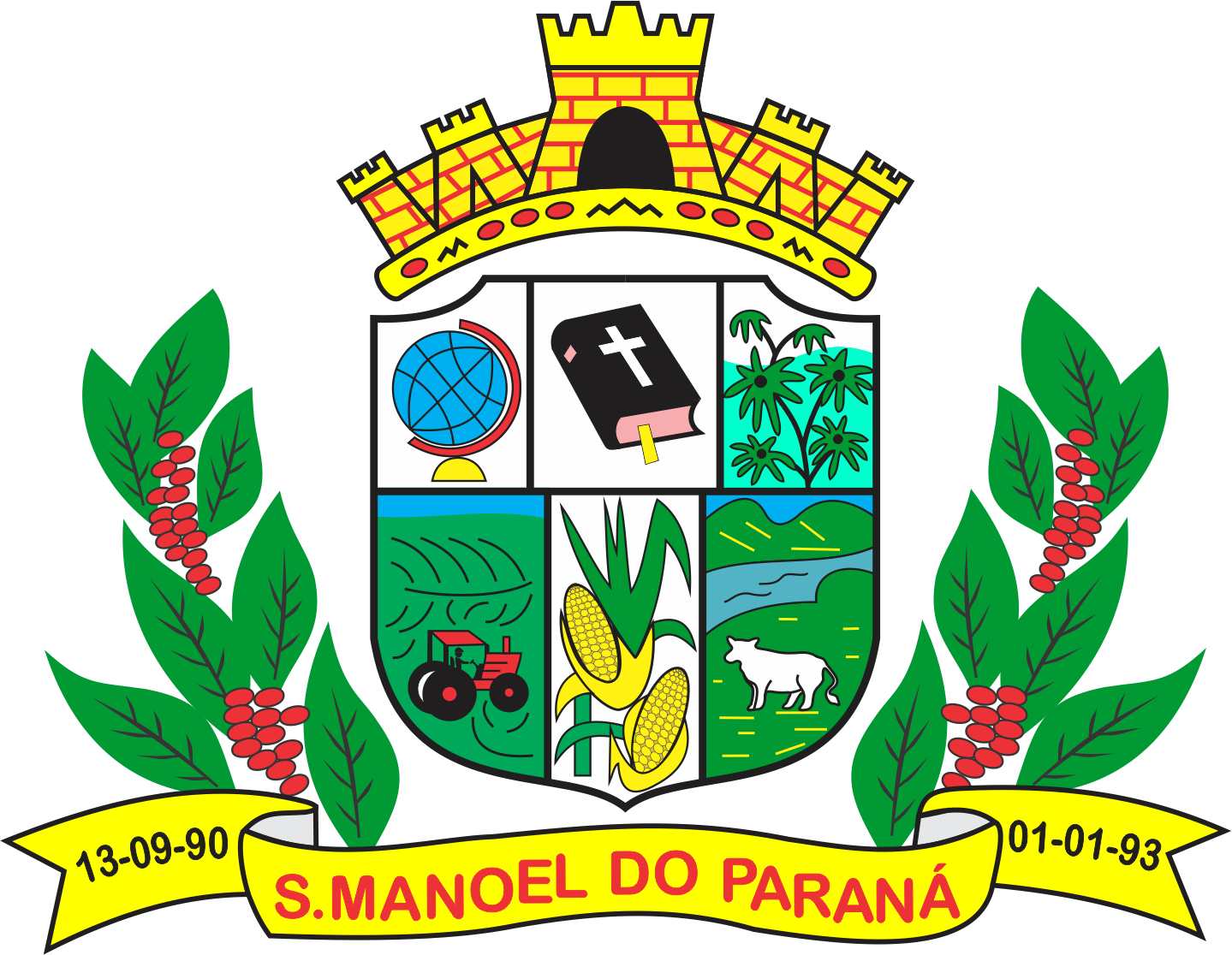
- Flag Coat of arms
- Interactive map of São Manoel do Paraná
- Country: Brazil
- Region: Southern
- State: Paraná
- Mesoregion: Noroeste Paranaense

Population (2020)
  - Total: 2,163
- Time zone: UTC−3 (BRT)

São Manoel do Paraná is a municipality in the state of Paraná in the Southern Region of Brazil.

== Notable people ==
- Eunice Weaver (1902–1969) - Philanthropist

== See also ==
- List of municipalities in Paraná
