= George Lovejoy Rockwell =

American vaudeville performer (1889–1978)

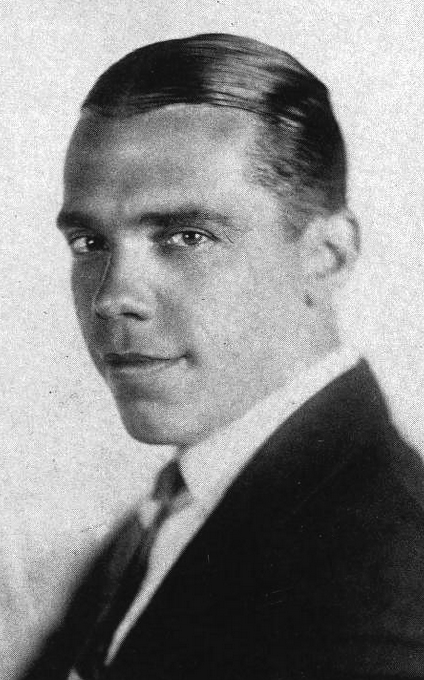
- Portrait of Rockwell, c. 1928
- Born: March 19, 1889; Providence, Rhode Island, U.S.
- Died: March 2, 1978 (aged 88); Brunswick, Maine, U.S.
- Other name: Doc Rockwell
- Education: Rhode Island School of Design
- Occupations: Vaudeville performer, radio personality
- Years active: 1910s–1940s
- Spouse: Claire Schade (m. 1915; div. 1924)
- Children: 3, including George Lincoln

George Lovejoy "Doc" Rockwell (March 19, 1889 – March 2, 1978) was an American vaudeville performer and radio personality, active in performing from the 1910s to the early 1940s. Several of his acts involved bananas, leading to the quack doctor banana skit from which he gained his nickname. He appeared in two revues on Broadway, and appeared unbilled as himself in the 1937 comedy film The Singing Marine. Writer Anthony Slide described him as "one of the great 'nut' acts of vaudeville".

Rockwell created a series of comedy magazines entitled Ye Olde Mustard Plaster, later Dr. Rockwell's Mustard Plaster. He also had a short-lived radio show on the NBC Radio Network. Following his retirement in the 1940s, he wrote a column for Maine's Down East magazine, and worked as a sign painter. His eldest son, George Lincoln Rockwell, later became a notorious neo-Nazi and the founder of the American Nazi Party. While Rockwell disavowed his son's beliefs and actions, it nevertheless tarnished his name and reputation.

== Early life ==
George Lovejoy Rockwell was born March 19, 1889, in Providence, Rhode Island. He was the eldest son of George Scott Rockwell and Mary MacPherson. His parents had moved to Providence from Nova Scotia in Canada. He had two younger sisters, Marguerite or "Margie", and Helen. He was of English and Scottish descent.

Rockwell attended local public schools, and won a scholarship at the Rhode Island School of Design. He studied commercial art and went on to work with the Boston company C. I. Brink. At this time he spent a large amount of his time reading how-to books on a variety of skills. This included stage magic, and he began to give small scale performances at what he later called "bum church entertainments". Before he developed his main routine, he worked as a theatrical booker.

== Career ==
Rockwell joined vaudeville and began performing in the 1910s. He learned the cornet, and combined this with his stage magic, which allowed his act to branch out; after a friend suggested that there was more money in song and dance acts, he found a female partner and created a routine. At this time he contracted typhoid fever, and was placed in a ward. There, having time to think, he decided that an act with two men was "freer" than one man and one woman. Despite his small stature (he stood at 5'4'', he was known for his dominating and attention-grabbing persona.

Writer Anthony Slide described him as "one of the great "nut" acts of vaudeville". Rockwell gained prominence for his monologues at the Palace Theater in New York City. Rockwell headlined at Palace six times, the first in April 1925, the last in May 1932. Having an interest in natural remedies and food, he parodied such ideas in his comedy routines; many of his routines involved patently absurd medical advice.

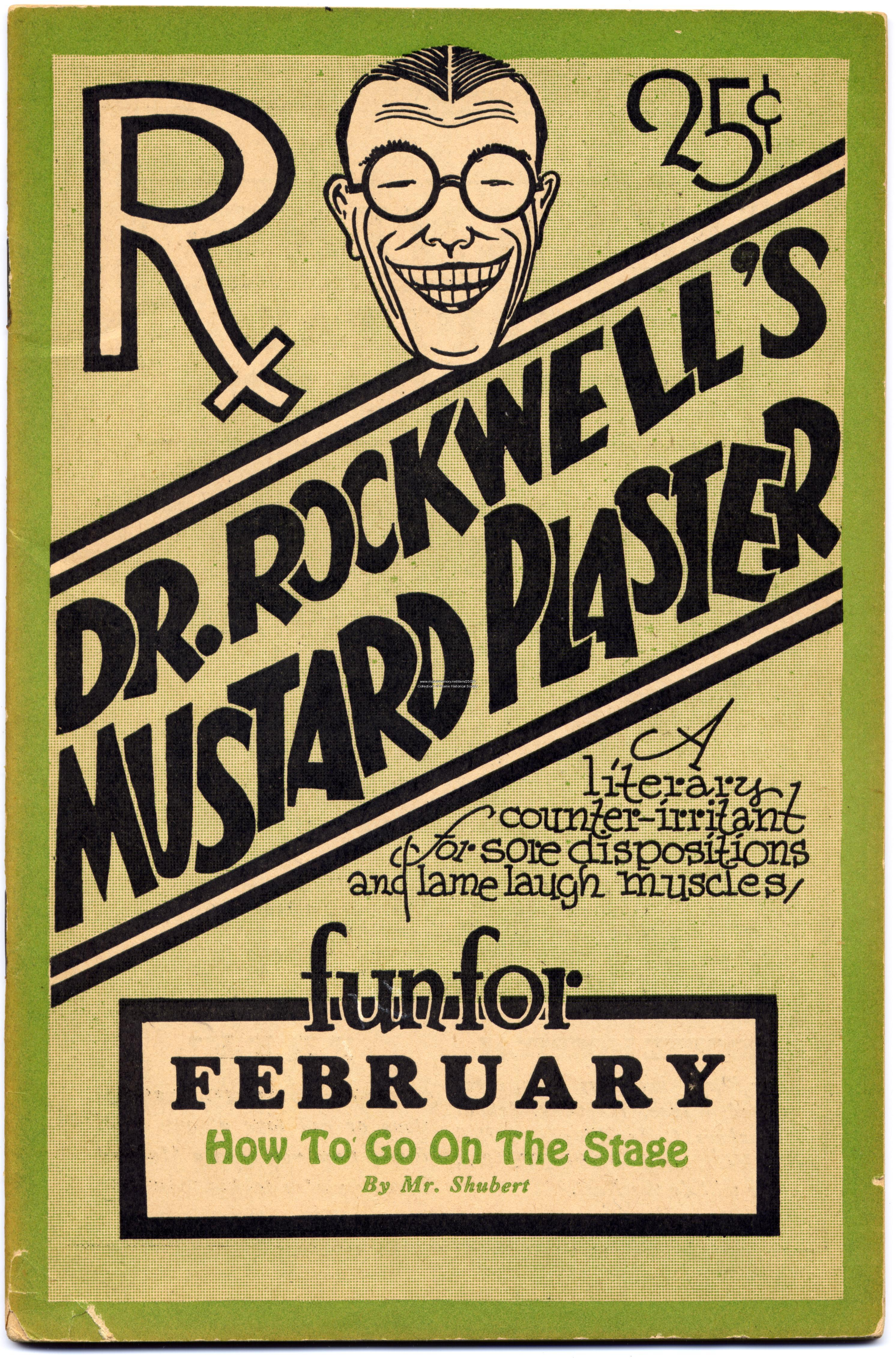
Cover of the February 1929 issue of Dr. Rockwell's Mustard Plaster

Several of his acts involved bananas, which began when he carried several that remained from a previous act involving monkeys into a different routine. He decided to launch them into the audience, which was met with a great reaction from the crowd, so he added it to many different acts. This led to an incident in Cleveland, where, out of bananas (all eaten by his stagehands) he used the remaining banana stalk to represent a human spine, while lecturing as a quack doctor explaining its apparent true function. This garnered him the nickname Doc Rockwell, and it became his trademark routine. His routines were afterwards billed as "Doc Rockwell — Quack, Quack, Quack!"

He toured in the vaudeville circuits of Benjamin Franklin Keith and the Shuberts, writing for the Shuberts' The Greenwich Village Follies, for which he eventually appeared in 1928. By 1921, he had become one of the highest paid vaudeville actors in the nation. Rockwell's family were initially uncertain about how to respond to his fame. He appeared in two revues on Broadway, George White's Scandals (1920) and later Seven Lively Arts.

In 1928, he created a comedy magazine, Ye Olde Mustard Plaster, later renamed to Dr. Rockwell's Mustard Plaster. It was edited, written, and published by Rockwell, and was issued monthly. The magazine was referred to by one commentator as a precursor to Mad Magazine in its content and topics. At its peak it had 20,000 subscribers.

In the 1930s, he also appeared on the inaugural bill at Radio City Music Hall (on December 27, 1932), at the Ziegfeld Theater, and appeared unbilled acting as himself in a single film, the 1937 musical comedy The Singing Marine. In 1939 Rockwell had his own short-lived national radio show on NBC, and through the 1940s he was a frequent guest on the radio show of his close friend Fred Allen. He and Allen appeared together on television.

== Later life ==
He retired from performance in the early 1940s, and moved to a farmhouse in Southport, Maine, which he nicknamed Slipshod Manor. While in Maine he became a local celebrity, but still returned to New York for the occasional radio show. Frequent visitors at the manor included well-known entertainment world personalities, including Groucho Marx, Benny Goodman, George Burns, Rudy Vallée, and Martha Graham, among others. He for a time apparently worked in lobstering, but found this physically straining; he worked as a sign painter.

For many years after his retirement from performing, Doc Rockwell contributed a humor column, "Doc Rockwell's Newsletter", to the Maine magazine Down East, containing anecdotes about Maine. He had the last page from shortly after the magazine's founding in 1954 to his death. Rockwell always signed his column with "Dr. Geo. Rockwell, maker of fine cigar ashes since 1889."

== Personal life ==
In 1915, he met Claire Schade at a theater managed by her father. Schade was a toe dancer, a well-known performer since her childhood who performed as part of her family's act as "The Four Schades". They married and settled in Bloomington, Illinois. She gave up her career to be his wife and have his children, as he wanted it. They had three children, George Lincoln (also often called Lincoln, born 1918), Robert (born 1919), and Priscilla (born 1921). Claire largely retired from vaudeville performance after Lincoln's birth, and entirely retired after the birth of their second child.

He was described by one biographer as an "egomaniac"; his marriage was unhappy, and Rockwell worked constantly. Rockwell and Claire eventually divorced in 1924, and the children spent the summers with Rockwell in Maine and the rest of the year with Claire in rural Illinois, who moved to live with her sister. It was later realized that legally, Rockwell and Schade had not completed the divorce. An interlocutory decree was granted in 1925, but Schade never filed the final divorce paperwork. This was realized 10 years later, in 1935, and resulted in a legal battle upon the realization. He sued her after she declared she did not want to file a final divorce decree, in an effort to make her do so. His divorce lawyer was Benjamin M. McLyman.

The case involved US$4,500 (equivalent to $104,406 in 2025) in unpaid back alimony and child support from Rockwell, while Schade withheld a US$25,000 (equivalent to $580,036 in 2025) insurance policy on Rockwell's life, and also involved Rockwell asking for a lesser alimony payment due to an inability to pay it. Schade wanted the payment increased. The alimony payment was eventually lowered, and Schade agreed to stop withholding the life insurance policy and agree to the complete the divorce. She filed paperwork to that end in April 1936. They maintained no contact. After their divorce, Madelyn Meredith, who performed with Rockwell, became his common-law wife.

=== Relationship with eldest son ===
A biographer of his eldest son George Lincoln Rockwell described Rockwell as "belittl[ing] his eldest at every occasion", while a relative said he could not recall "one instance of affection expressed by Doc toward Lincoln". He was emotionally distant and uncaring towards his son. Some of the dispute was apparently due to Rockwell's self-consciousness over his height: Lincoln was 6'4'' to Rockwell's 5'4''. Lincoln wanted Rockwell's approval, and made an effort to emulate his father despite their unstable relationship. In 1943, Rockwell missed Lincoln's wedding, showing up two days after the fact.

Lincoln later became a neo-Nazi and the founder of the American Nazi Party. Lincoln was and is deeply influential to the neo-Nazi movement; a director of the Southern Poverty Law Center described him as "the most important figure in the white supremacist movement since World War II". Lincoln later attributed the actions of his father's Jewish entertainment guests as having influenced his antisemitism; however, he said that his parents had not been different than the parents of "millions of other American boys who are not leading Hitler movements". Rockwell's son's views and actions devastated him and tarnished his name and reputation: when called for comment by the Portland Press Herald in 1961 after a high-profile Nazi protest by his son, Rockwell apologized for what his son had done. Those who knew Rockwell and Madelyn noticed they seemed to deteriorate after this incident and were not the same afterwards. He disagreed with his son's views, and tried repeatedly to change his mind. His attempts to dissuade his son failed, with this only resulting in bitter fights, after which they ceased contact. He initially disavowed him, but later was silent about his son entirely. Friends did not bring up the subject of his son with Rockwell.

Lincoln was murdered by a former member of the American Nazi Party in 1967. Rockwell's only statement was: "I'm not surprised at all. I've expected it for quite some time. I think he would have liked to have gotten rid of the whole Nazi mess. He was more afraid of his own men than people were of him." Rockwell arranged for the private burial of his son in Maine, but the American Nazi Party seized the remains and cremated them.

== Death ==
Rockwell died on March 2, 1978, at Brunswick Manor Nursing Home in Brunswick, Maine, at the age of 88. A funeral was planned to be held March 5, at the Simmons & Harrington Funeral Home in Boothbay Harbor, with Rockwell to be buried in Southport, Maine.
