= George Lincoln Rockwell =

American neo-Nazi activist (1918–1967)

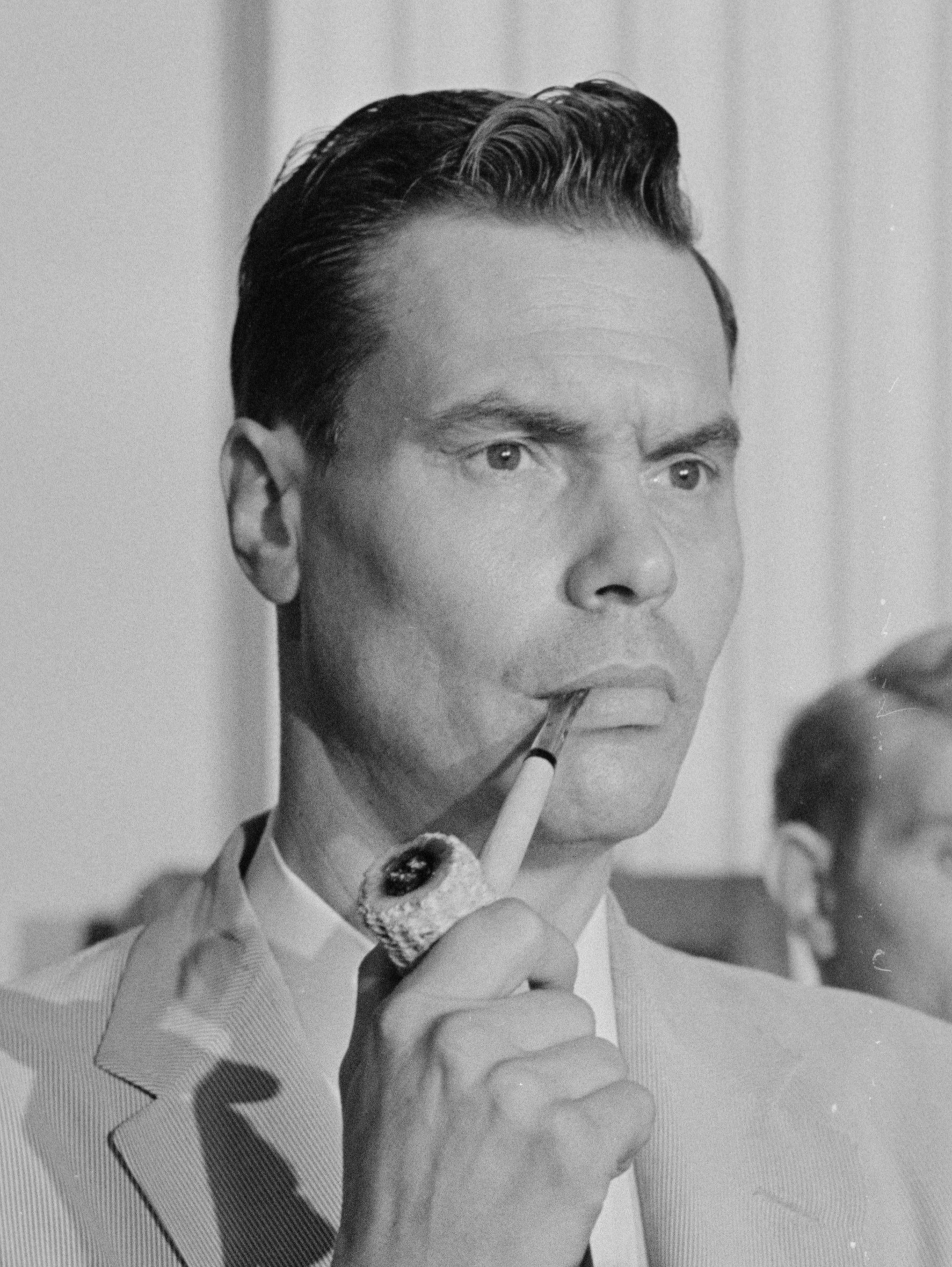
- Rockwell at a hearing of the House Un-American Activities Committee, 1963

1st Commander of the American Nazi Party
- In office March 1959 – August 25, 1967
- Preceded by: Position established
- Succeeded by: Matt Koehl

Personal details
- Born: March 9, 1918 Bloomington, Illinois, U.S.
- Died: August 25, 1967 (aged 49) Arlington County, Virginia, U.S.
- Cause of death: Assassination by gunshot
- Party: American Nazi
- Spouses: Judith Aultman (m. 1943; div. 1953); Margrét Þóra Hallgrímsson (m. 1953; div. 1961)
- Children: 7
- Parents: George Lovejoy Rockwell; Claire Schade
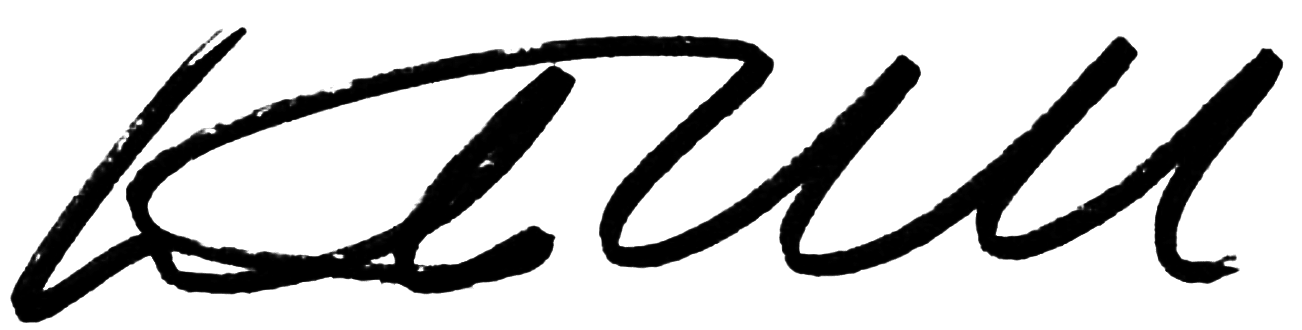
- Signature

Military service
- Branch/service: United States Navy
- Years of service: 1941–1960
- Rank: Commander
- Battles/wars: World War II; Pacific War; Battle of the Atlantic; Korean War

George Lincoln Rockwell (March 9, 1918 – August 25, 1967) was an American neo-Nazi activist and politician who became one of the most notorious white supremacists in the United States until his assassination in 1967. While Rockwell remains obscure to the American public and never achieved political power, he remains an influence on far-right extremism.

Born in Bloomington, Illinois, to two vaudeville performers, Rockwell briefly studied philosophy at Brown University before dropping out to join the Navy. He trained as a pilot and served in World War II in the European and Pacific theaters, as well as the Korean War in non-combat roles, achieving the rank of Commander. Rockwell's politics grew more radical and vocal in the 1950s, and he was honorably discharged due to his views in 1960. He founded the American Nazi Party in 1959 in Arlington, Virginia, using high-profile media stunts to increase its notoriety as a step to power. This did not work, and despite their notoriety Rockwell remained politically fringe. Rockwell coined the expression White Power, which was also the title of his posthumously published political manifesto.

In early 1967, Rockwell renamed the ANP the National Socialist White People's Party (NSWPP) as part of an effort to broaden the party's white supremacist vision. On August 25, 1967, Rockwell was assassinated in Arlington by John Patler, a former member of the ANP whom Rockwell had expelled. Rockwell was succeeded as leader by his second-in-command Matt Koehl; following Rockwell's death, the group effectively dissolved, splintering into numerous different neo-Nazi organizations.

In politics, Rockwell regularly praised Adolf Hitler, denied the Holocaust, and believed that Martin Luther King Jr. was a tool for Jewish communists desiring to rule the white community. He blamed the civil rights movement on Jews and viewed most of them as traitors. He viewed black people as a primitive race and supported the resettlement of all African Americans in a new African state to be funded by the U.S. government.

== Early life and education ==
=== Upbringing and family ===
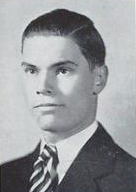
Rockwell's 1938 Hebron Academy yearbook photo

Rockwell was born in Bloomington, Illinois, on March 9, 1918, the oldest of three children born to vaudeville performers George Lovejoy "Doc" Rockwell and Claire Schade. Rockwell was of English and Scottish ancestry on his paternal side and of French and German ancestry on his maternal side. At the time of Rockwell's birth, his father Doc Rockwell was rising in fame, and by 1921, he was a star and one of the highest-paid vaudeville actors in the nation. His mother largely retired from performance after Rockwell was born. He was usually called Lincoln, and went by the nickname Link. His parents divorced when Rockwell was six years old, and for the rest of his youth he divided his time between his mother in Atlantic City, New Jersey, and his father in Boothbay Harbor, Maine.

His father was emotionally distant and constantly belittled him. A biographer described Rockwell's father as "an egomaniac"; a relative said that he could not recall a single instance of Rockwell's father expressing affection for him. Rockwell greatly desired his father's approval, and made an effort to emulate him. While his father continued to be financially well off, he often did not pay child support, and his ex-wife and children struggled to make ends meet. After the divorce, Claire moved in with her sister, Arline; Arline was a domineering woman who despised Rockwell's father. Arline regularly beat Rockwell from the ages of 6 to 15, and psychologically abused Rockwell until he left for college. Unlike his two siblings, he refused to submit to her authority, which only led to more abuse.

His family was often casually antisemitic, but not to a greater extent than most middle-class families of the time. Doc Rockwell's business friends, many of whom were Jewish, frequently visited their family home, including Benny Goodman, Groucho Marx, and Walter Winchell. Rockwell's mother may have had antisemitic views. His father was inconsistent; he had used antisemitic epithets at home, but the outward display of it horrified him and later he tried repeatedly to dissuade his son from his views. Rockwell was an extroverted and rebellious teenager, resulting in disciplinary action taken against him at school and middling grades. Despite this, he was well liked in his community; many expected him to go into show business like his father. He was a self taught reed and flageolet player and organized a big band called the "Phantoms of Swing" as a teenager, which played locally. He worked as a waiter at a local hotel as a teenager.

=== Education ===
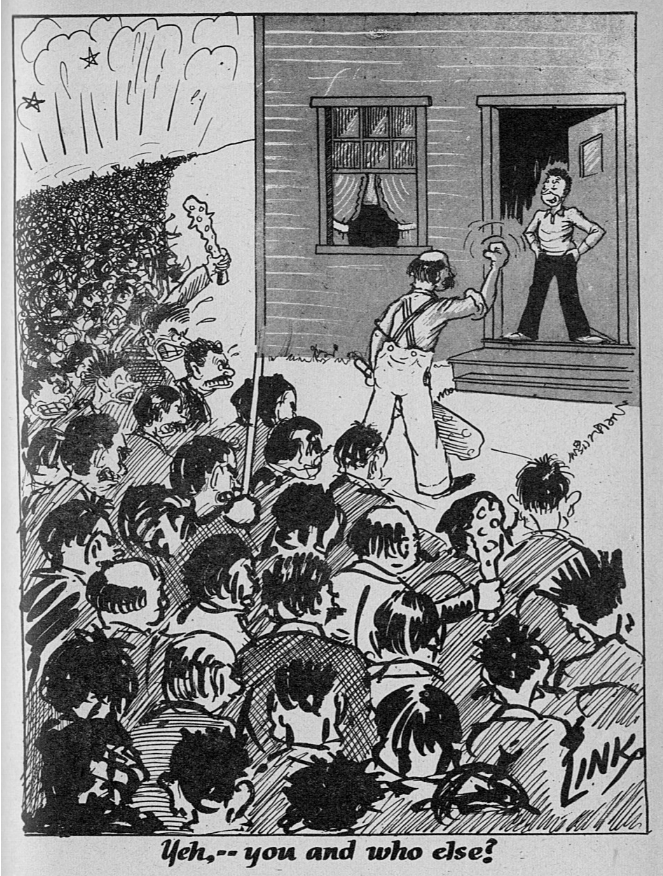
Cartoon made by Rockwell during his time at Brown

Rockwell attended Atlantic City High School, but after a conflict with a teacher in his senior year he went "on strike" and engaged in dramatic protests over his teaching. The school informed Rockwell that he would not graduate unless he stopped; Rockwell refused, and was not allowed to graduate, though the school did force the teacher in question to change his teaching methods. That summer, Rockwell was sent to live with his paternal grandmother and repeated his senior year of high school at Central High School in Providence, Rhode Island.

His father encouraged him to apply to Harvard University, wanting him to get into an Ivy League school. While his grades at his second high school were much better, they were still inconsistent, and so to help his chances Rockwell spent another semester at Hope High School. He received a second high school diploma from Hope but was still rejected from Harvard after some of his school records were mistakenly not forwarded. Having not applied to any other college out of confidence that he would be admitted, his father instead enrolled him in Hebron Academy in Hebron, Maine, for the year. A classmate at Hebron, John Hahn, recalled him as "a tall, skinny teenager who – even then – smoked a pipe, had a lot of odd ideas, trained mice, and loved classical music."

In 1938, Rockwell enrolled and began studying at Brown University in Providence, Rhode Island as a philosophy major. While his grades were mediocre and below the standards of Brown, he was accepted due to his high score on the aptitude test. At Brown, he was art editor and a cartoonist for Sir Brown!, the campus magazine, which he used to attack those at the school he ideologically opposed. He became increasingly pessimistic about society and humanity, and conflicted especially with his sociology professor over his disagreement with egalitarianism. After writing a paper about crime and delinquency for his sociology class, he was nearly expelled due to its contents. In his sophomore year, Rockwell dropped out of Brown and accepted a commission in the United States Navy.

== Military service ==
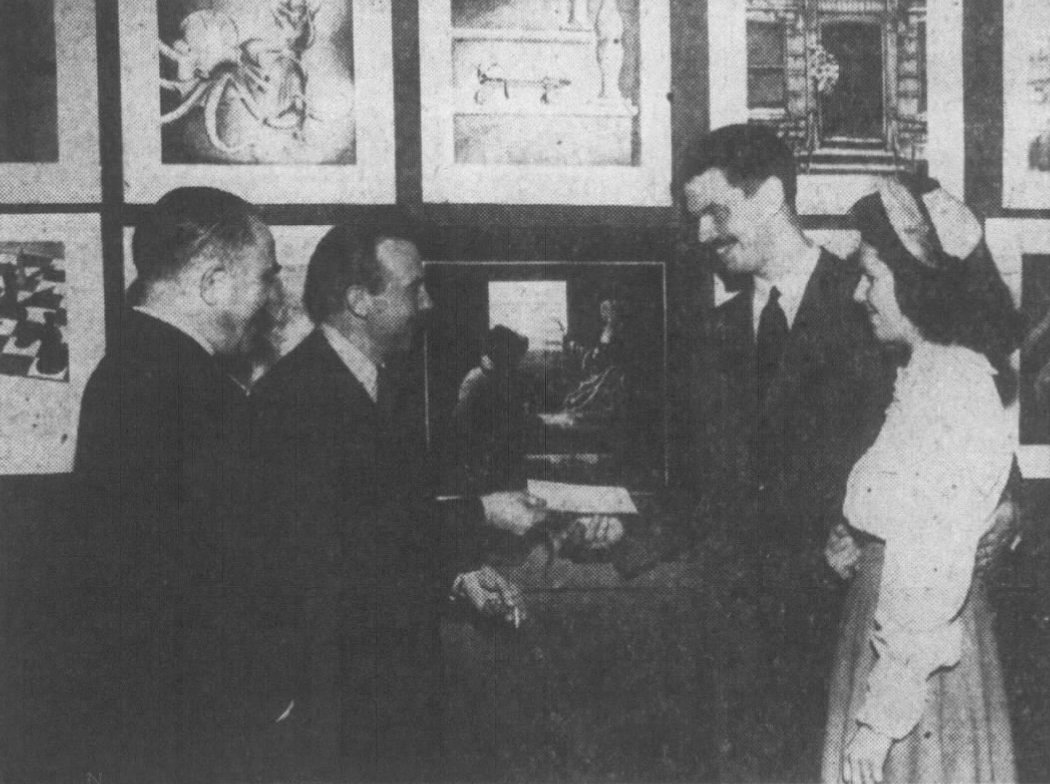
Rockwell (right, with his then-wife Judith Aultman) winning an art prize as part of a contest run by the American Cancer Society

Rockwell appreciated the order and discipline of the Navy and attended flight schools in Massachusetts and Florida in 1940. When he completed his training, he served in the Battle of the Atlantic and the Pacific War in World War II. He served aboard the USS Omaha, USS Pastores, USS Wasp and USS Mobile, primarily in support, photo reconnaissance, transport and training functions. His assignment to surveillance missions instead of combat roles irritated him, and he attempted to be transferred to a combat role; he was eventually assigned to a position on Support Air Command to direct pilots from the ground by radio. Rockwell never flew in combat, but was considered a good pilot and an efficient officer.

In April 1943, Rockwell married Judith Aultman, whom he had met while attending Brown University. Aultman was a student at Pembroke College, which was the coordinate women's college of the university. The couple had three daughters: Bonnie (born 1946), Nancy (born 1949), and Phoebe-Jean. Rockwell did not get along with his in-laws; he blamed them for not raising Judith to be "docile and compliant", his image of the perfect wife. His marriage was marred by violent arguments, and on at least one occasion, he struck his wife.

After the war ended, Rockwell worked as a sign painter out of a small shop on land owned by his father in Boothbay Harbor, Maine. He was promoted to lieutenant commander by October 1945. In 1946, he entered the commercial art program at the Pratt Institute in Brooklyn, New York. He and his wife Judith moved to New York City so he could study at Pratt. He did well at Pratt, winning the $1,000 first prize for an advertisement he did for the American Cancer Society. He abruptly left Pratt before finishing his final year and moved to Maine to found his own advertising agency.

=== San Diego (1950–1952) ===
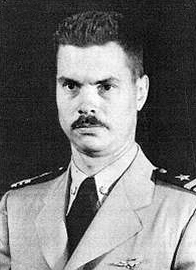
Rockwell during his time in the Navy, pictured May 1951

In 1950, Rockwell was recalled to duty at the beginning of the Korean War, where he was assigned to the Naval Air Support School at the San Diego Naval Air Station in San Diego, California. There he trained United States Marine Corps and navy pilots. At this time, his marriage was troubled, and his wife and children did not initially move to San Diego with him; Judith moved to Connecticut with their children. Rockwell, missing his children, eventually begged Judith to come back. She agreed and moved to San Diego with their children, only for them to begin fighting again. Rockwell would move out several times, then move back in again after convincing Judith to take him back. During this time, they had a third daughter, Phoebe-Jean.

While in San Diego, Rockwell supported General Douglas MacArthur's candidacy for president of the United States. At the time, Rockwell believed in Joseph McCarthy's claims that the United States was being subverted by communism. Other supporters of MacArthur introduced him to antisemitic conspiracies, and Rockwell did more research on his own, eventually concluding that communism was actually a front for a Jewish conspiracy. This led him to, in 1951, buy and read Hitler's manifesto Mein Kampf. He later described reading it as "finding part of me" and said it "bathed all the gray world suddenly in the clear light of reason and understanding". He also read the forged antisemitic tract The Protocols of the Elders of Zion. Rockwell later wrote that although he did not tell anyone of this, by this time he had become "an all-out Nazi"; he considered his radicalization to be him seeing the world as it was for the first time and as an epiphany.

=== Iceland (1952–1954) ===
In November 1952, Rockwell was transferred to Iceland, where he became a Grumman F8F Bearcat pilot. Rockwell attended a diplomatic party in Reykjavík where he met Thora Hallgrimsson, the niece of Iceland's ambassador to the United States. He asked Judith for a divorce shortly after meeting Thora, and she agreed. His involvement with Judith and their children was later limited and he rarely saw or communicated with them, outside of discussion over child support, which he often failed to pay.

Rockwell and Thora were married on October 3, 1953, and spent their honeymoon in Berchtesgaden, Germany, where Hitler once owned the Berghof mountain retreat in the Bavarian Alps. He asked the Navy for a one-year extension of his duty there, which was given. On January 9, 1954, he was promoted to commander. Rockwell and Thora had three children: Lincoln Hallgrimmur (b. 1954), Jeannie Margaret, and Evelyn; Thora's son from a previous marriage also lived with them.

=== Early political activities (1954–1959) ===
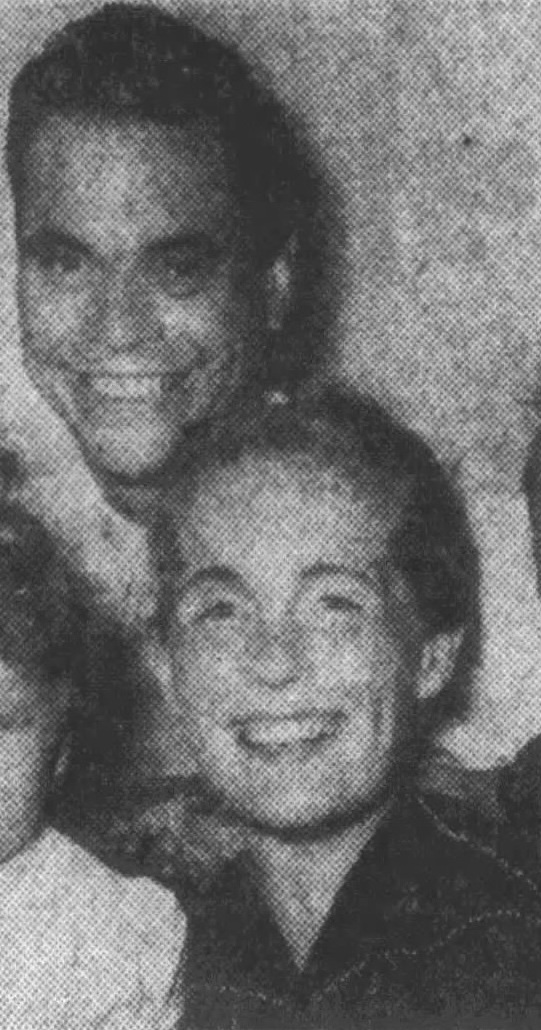
Rockwell and Thora in 1955

In December 1954 his tour ended and Rockwell was detached to inactive duty, after which he moved to the U.S. with Thora and their children. Trying to support the family, he experimented with several vocations, including freelance writing, from which he achieved some sales and numerous rejections. He also experimented with inventing. He launched U.S. Lady, a magazine for United States servicemen's wives. Though it was at times fairly lucrative and had a large circulation, it was distributed for free and Rockwell had a falling out with his business partners, so he sold the magazine in 1956. Afterwards, he worked briefly as an independent contractor for the National Review. Rockwell was for many years a close friend of the far-right activist Willis Carto, writing for his far-right magazine Right and distributing the periodical in the 1950s.

In 1957–1958, Rockwell had a series of dreams that all ended with him meeting Hitler, prompting him to go public with his ideology. In 1958, Rockwell met Harold Noel Arrowsmith Jr., a wealthy heir and antisemite who provided Rockwell with a house and printing equipment. They formed the National Committee to Free America from Jewish Domination. In 1958, he helped in the founding of a racist political party in Georgia, the National States' Rights Party; Rockwell advised them and his National Committee to Free America from Jewish Domination supplied them with materials. Many significant members of this group would later join Rockwell's group, including James K. Warner and Matt Koehl.

On July 29, 1958, Rockwell demonstrated in front of the White House in an anti-war protest against President Dwight D. Eisenhower's decision to send peacekeeping troops to the Middle East, known as Operation Blue Bat. Rockwell and his supporters specifically protested what they supposed was Jewish control of the government.

In October 1958, following the Hebrew Benevolent Congregation Temple bombing, news reports initially linked to Rockwell to the crime; the FBI suspected his involvement, but they were unable to directly link him to it. As a result, Rockwell was outed as a Nazi to the public, and his home was searched by police the day after the bombing. This resulted in negative coverage and attention drawn to his family, which shocked and devastated them. Afterwards his brother Robert became convinced Rockwell had clinical paranoia. He wrote to Rockwell with his concerns about his mental state and offered to help him if he would stop his racist associations and seek intensive therapy (which he offered to pay for); if he refused he would have to cut contact. In return, Rockwell rejected his plan, discussed a world conspiracy that he believed was against him, and insulted his brother.

Following this, Thora's parents flew to the U.S. to take their daughter back to Iceland after they learned of Rockwell's political activities. Rockwell agreed to let her go back to Iceland with their children, knowing his financial difficulties made her life difficult. She promised she would return after a year when he had a steadier financial position. Following their separation, he attempted to rekindle his relationship with Thora throughout the year of 1959, but her family was strongly against it; he heavily drank throughout the year. In December 1959 he sold all his possessions to visit her in Iceland, either after being invited, or without warning. He tried to convince her to take him back, offering to abandon politics entirely; James K. Warner, the ANP national secretary, said that he had no doubt that "if Rockwell's wife had agreed to let him stay in Iceland he would have deserted the party". The trip was heavily monitored by Thora's family, Rockwell was rejected, and he returned home. He never saw her or their children again. Devastated, he told his mother he had nothing left to live for and said he might kill himself. Afterwards, his communications changed tone and he renewed his allegiance to his ideology.

== American Nazi Party ==
=== Early days and discharge from the Navy (1959–1960) ===
In early 1959, Rockwell founded the World Union of Free Enterprise National Socialists (WUFENS), which was eventually shortened to World Union of National Socialists (WUNS), making contact with leaders of neo-Nazi movements in other countries, including Colin Jordan. In October 1959, Rockwell founded the American Nazi Party, and its headquarters became 928 North Randolph Street in Arlington, which also became Rockwell's home.

As a result of his political activities and increasing prominence as a well-known racist, the Chief of Naval Personnel sent Rockwell a letter on January 6, 1960, warning him he could be dismissed from the Navy due to his racist views. Rockwell was scheduled a hearing before a board of officers. While waiting for the hearing, he wrote In Hoc Signo Vinces (lit. 'In This Sign You Shall Conquer'), a pamphlet that expressed his admiration for the swastika as a symbol and his idea that the white race had to reconquer the Earth. After Rockwell shifted to open neo-Nazism, he ceased writing for Carto's magazine Right, which was not explicitly neo-Nazi, but continuing working with and being friends with Carto; Carto, in turn, spoke highly of Rockwell and the American Nazi Party. This ended when, in 1964, Carto and Rockwell had a split after Rockwell accused Carto's idol Francis Parker Yockey of being a Soviet agent.

During his February 1, 1960 hearing, he further expressed his racism at the hearing held over his discharge. He and his witnesses accused Anna Rosenberg, the United States Assistant Secretary of Defense, who was Jewish, of being a traitor. The board voted unanimously and Rockwell was given an honorable discharge. The discharge disturbed him further, as at this point, Rockwell had given up everything else in his life for his views. He was discharged only a short time before he would have been eligible to retire with a pension, and due to his finances Rockwell needed the stipend given by his position. Despite the discharge he continued to go by the title of "the Commander" for his activism.

=== Media stunts and quarantine (1960–1963) ===
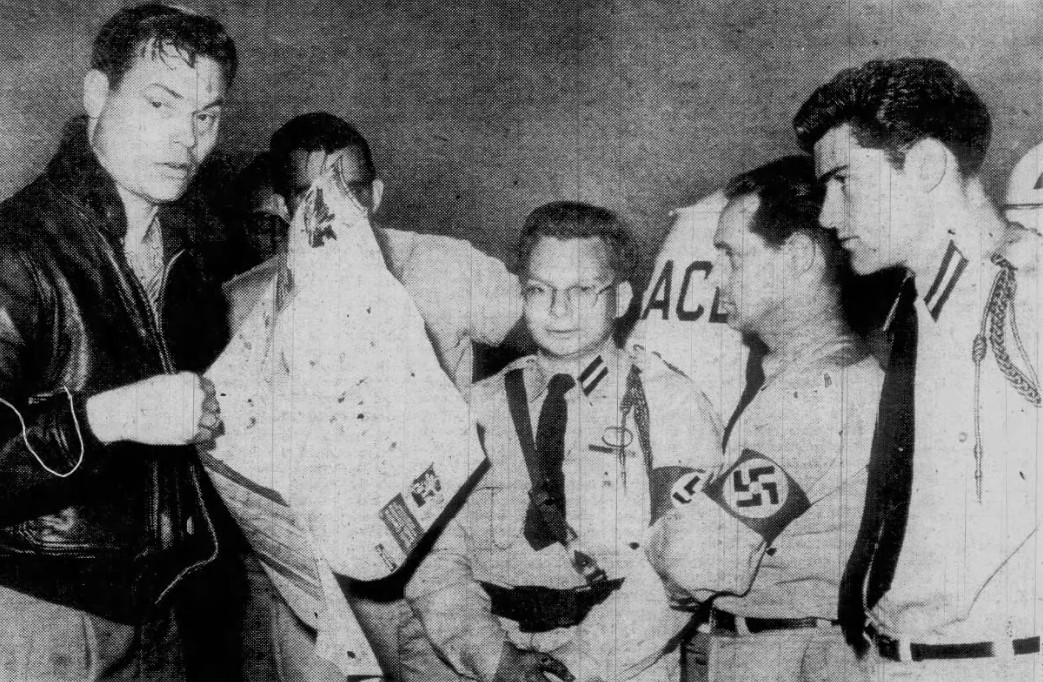
Rockwell briefing party members in 1961

Rockwell was adept at using political stunts to promote his movement. He aimed to get the maximum amount of media coverage possible, and would use the negative response by provoking people to gain publicity, particularly through provoking the Jewish community specifically, but also society at large. This was successful, in large part due to the rise of the civil rights movement in the United States.

In response, the American Jewish community developed a strategy of quarantine to prevent Rockwell from increasing his audience; this strategy was previously used against Gerald L. K. Smith. S. Andhil Fineberg, the head of the American Jewish Committee public relations division, developed a strategy of isolating Rockwell from all "three publics": the Jewish public, the general public, and the anti-Semitic public, all in different ways. He encouraged the Jewish community to have a restrained reaction to Rockwell. Members of the American Nazi Party, especially Matt Koehl, believed there was a more elaborate economic boycott at play, all evidence of which was secretly eradicated. There is no evidence of this, and the quarantine also often failed.

Needing publicity despite the quarantine, Rockwell applied for a permit for a rally at Union Square in New York City on the weekend of July 4, knowing this would be immensely controversial. Newbold Morris, then the Parks Commissioner, initially said he would approve it; in response, the Public Awareness Society filed suit in the New York Supreme Court to prevent the ANP from being issued the permit. Several other groups also complained, including, among others, the League of Ghetto Fighters, Concentration Camp Victims, and Partisans, the Emma Lazarus Federation of Jewish Women's Clubs, and the Farband Labor Zionist Order. The Anti-Defamation League of B'nai B'rith were however on the opposite side, with national chairman Henry Schultz saying that the ADL was "very much for upholding the Constitutional rights of everyone—even nuts" and that "if the permit is granted, we hope New Yorkers will show their contempt by staying away in droves so that there will be no untoward episode which the Nazis can exploit." The New York Civil Liberties Union also said that New York should give him a permit, arguing that to do otherwise was to violate their constitutional rights. Rockwell arrived in court on June 22 to defend his application; when he left the building, a riot ensued, and Mayor Robert F. Wagner Jr. refused to grant him a permit to speak on the grounds that if it was granted the people of New York would attack him and a riot would form. Afterwards, the American Civil Liberties Union began to assist the ANP in their fight for the permit, and they appealed the decision to the New York Supreme Court. They eventually won a permit, but it was long after the date of the planned event. He never ended up speaking in Union Square.

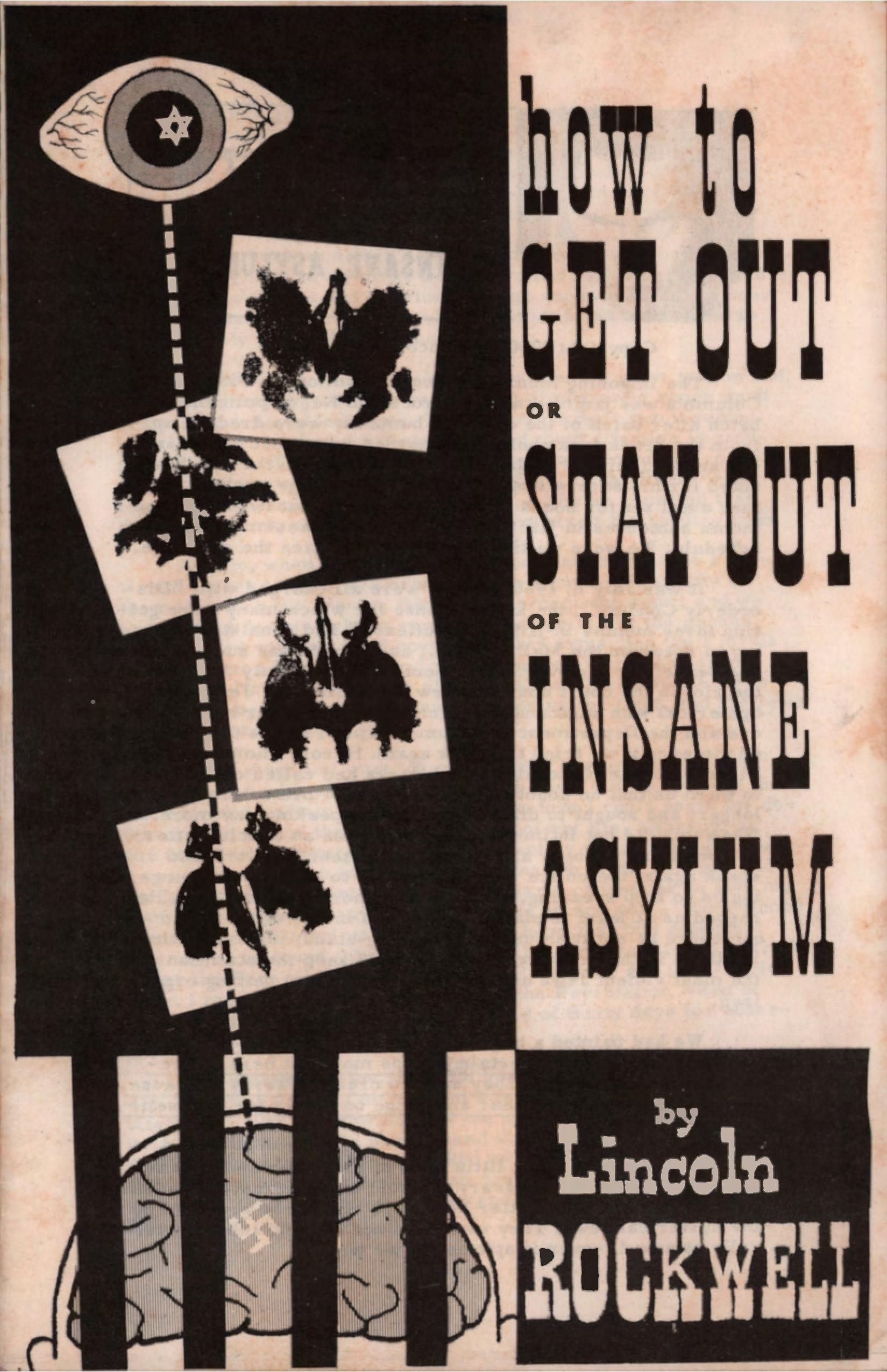
Cover page of Rockwell's 1960 pamphlet about his institutionalization, How to Get Out or Stay Out of the Insane Asylum

On July 3, 1960, Rockwell and his men fought with the Jewish War Veterans group, resulting in a brawl. Rockwell was charged with disorderly conduct; however, at trial, the judge declared him mentally incompetent to stand trial and he was involuntarily committed to a psychiatric hospital for thirty days. He defended his mental health by citing his military experience, but this failed to convince the judge. He was let out after only a few days, after a psychiatrist deemed him competent to stand trial. The psychiatrist diagnosed him as having a paranoid personality, but said that it was "well controlled" and lacked "uncontrolled paranoid delusions" and so did not require hospitalization. He stood trial, was found guilty of disorderly conduct, and was fined $100. After this experience he became preoccupied with proving he was sane, and also declared psychiatry a Jewish field used to discredit those they opposed. He published a pamphlet inspired by this experience titled How to Get Out or Stay Out of the Insane Asylum in 1960, an antisemitic tract which discusses how to get out of an insane asylum by lying to psychiatrists. He noted that, since psychiatrists would be looking for "delusions of grandeur", as they had deemed his beliefs, one had to lie to leave, as he had done. In 1960, a close longtime friend of Rockwell's father, the Jewish columnist Harry Golden, wrote Rockwell urging him to see a psychiatrist.

In 1961, Rockwell published a memoir, This Time the World. In early 1962, Rockwell planned a rally to celebrate Hitler's birthday on April 20. In the summer, he attended a camp organized by British neo-Nazi Colin Jordan in Gloucestershire where they organized the World Union of National Socialists. In April 1962, Rockwell and ANP member Karl Allen attended the senate testimony of Edwin Walker, who accused government officials of being part of a government conspiracy. They were allowed to sit, but the next day, both were removed from the chamber when Rockwell wore a swastika emblem.

Rockwell's money habits and usage of the ANP's funding resulted in regular problems for the party and rough conditions for its members. Many became dissatisfied with his leadership. The second highest-ranking member, Karl Allen, left the ANP in December, claiming it was for personal reasons. This surprised Rockwell, and he was disturbed to lose the best educated member of the group and second in command. Many party members left and followed Allen, and drew up a list of grievances against Rockwell and his leadership tactics, particularly an inability to "refrain from inserting his personality and judgment into every minute part of the Party's operation". They enumerated a list of grievances to be addressed and changes in the party's operations if they were to rejoin. Rockwell refused to address the demands. He was most worried about a demand that he would no longer have sole discretion over the board of directors, which he worried would be used to take control of the party. From then on he declared them to be "the mutiny" and kept them out of the ANP.

==== Exodus protests and the Hate Bus (1961) ====
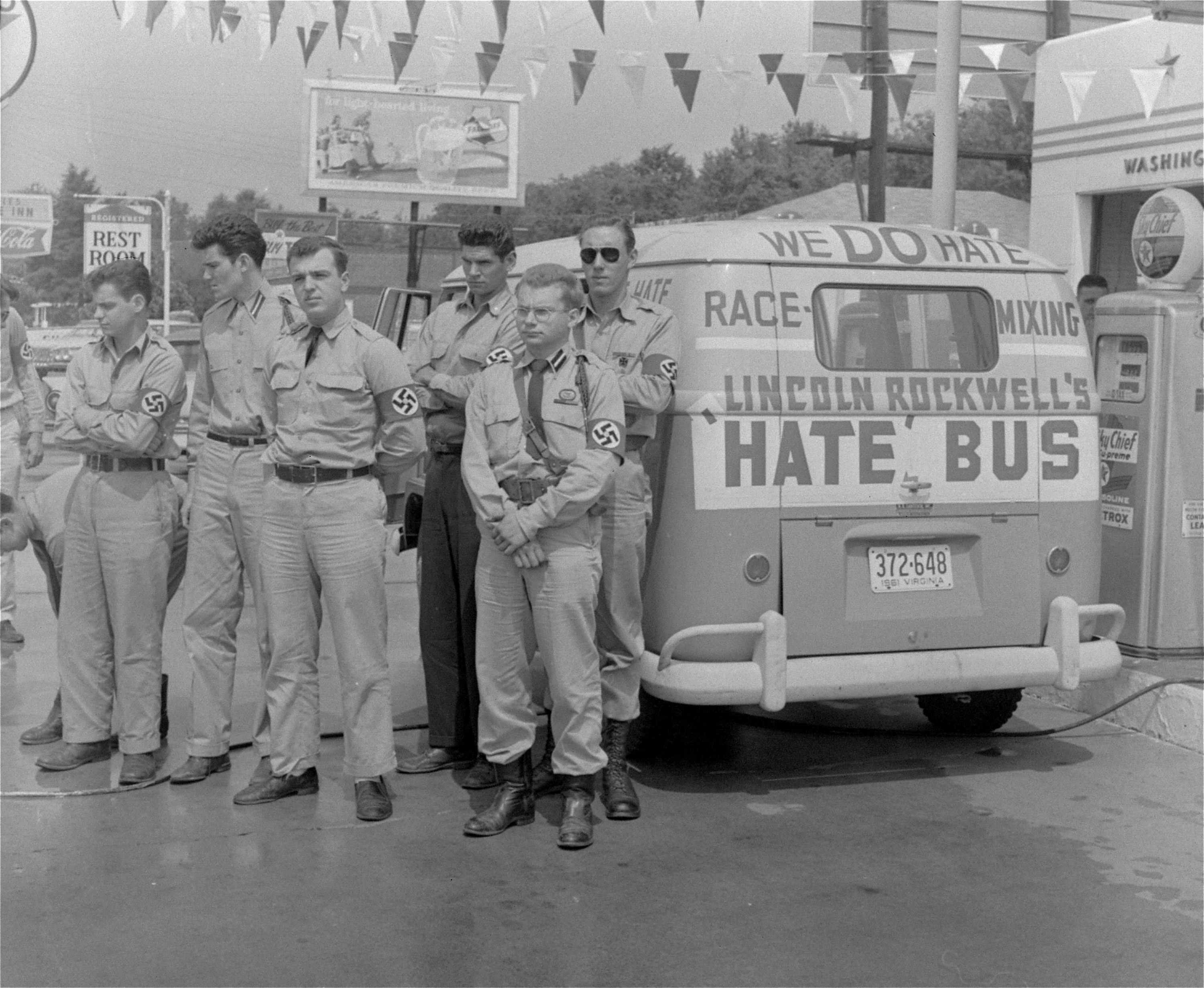
Members of the American Nazi Party stand with their "Hate Bus".

On January 15, 1961, Speros Lagoulis, a Nazi Party sympathizer, suggested to Rockwell that they picket the local premiere of the film Exodus at the Saxon Theatre in Downtown Boston, because it was a "filthy Zionist movie" and the screenwriter Dalton Trumbo had refused to testify at the House Un-American Activities Committee. Lagoulis financed the protest, and a truck was rented to bring more stormtroopers to Boston from Arlington, staying at the Hotel Touraine. They were met by hundreds, later thousands, of anti-Nazi counter protestors; Rockwell told the other members that they did not have to come with him, that it was a "suicide mission" and he would go alone, but the men went with him. This culminated in a riot, and Rockwell and his men were eventually forced into a police cruiser and taken into protective custody, later returning to Washington by plane. The picketing was a success for Rockwell — he stated that he would have "preferred to picket but I get more publicity from a riot" — and he soon sought to repeat it, thinking that if it was successful enough it might break the quarantine on him.

To mock the Freedom Riders, who drove their campaign for the desegregation of bus stations in the Deep South, Rockwell secured a green Volkswagen van, named the "Hate Bus", and planned to do his own demonstration. It was painted with the phrases "Lincoln Rockwell's Hate Bus" and "We Do Hate Race Mixing". Rockwell said the name was in an effort to discredit the word hate, saying that his men only "hate the things that every red-blooded American should hate—communists and race-mixing." They traveled in the Hate Bus to Montgomery, Alabama but were intercepted and not allowed to demonstrate; directed at both the Freedom Riders and the Hate Bus, the governor of Louisiana Jimmie Davis warned both groups that "outside agitators of either the extreme right or the extreme left" should stay out of the state.

On May 24, 1961, Rockwell and nine of his men were arrested on charges of disturbing the peace (the same charge often used against racial integrationists) in New Orleans after again trying to picket Exodus. All pled not guilty. Rockwell and one other member were bailed out on May 30, and all others were in short order. On June 13, 1961, all ten men were found guilty, receiving sentences ranging from 30 to 60 days and fines ranging from $50 to $100. In 1962, the convictions were overturned on appeal.

=== Political aims (1964–1966) ===
Rockwell was removed from the 1964 New Hampshire Democratic presidential primary in February 1964. Rockwell also started a petition to enter a state's Republican presidential primary. Rockwell in the presidential election got 212 write-in votes nationwide.

From 1964 to 1966, Rockwell was at his most significant. The party, while membership was not especially large, reached a new high, and numerous actions and stunts performed by the party to advertise their racism kept them notorious. While notoriety was a goal of Rockwell's, it was a goal he intended to use as a stepping stone to actual power. Instead, he had effectively no power and remained on the political fringes, frustrating his goals. He realized that only engaging with the public through provocation had its limits, and began to develop a longer-term strategy towards achieving actual political power.

Rockwell blamed the ANP's political insignificance on the subordinates and the quality of their recruits, who Rockwell believed were incompetent and did not properly understand the ideology of National Socialism they espoused. Koehl, one of the only members who actually met Rockwell's standards for an ANP member, had similar complaints. Rockwell tried new methods of attracting higher quality ANP recruits. He gave the ANP a front organization, the United White Christian Majority, trying to give it a wider appeal, and attempted to revive a prior youth group, the White Youth Corps, but both efforts failed to achieve what he wanted. Between 1964 and 1966, only two chapters of the party grew any significant amount (the chapters in Texas and Southern California).

Despite these failures, these recruitment attempts did bring in 1965 one significant member of the party, William Luther Pierce, who became one of Rockwell's closest advisors. In the spring of 1966, the party began publication of several pamphlets and books, including National Socialist World edited by Pierce. In the summer of 1966, Rockwell led a counter-demonstration against King's attempt to bring an end to de facto segregation in the white Chicago suburb of Cicero, Illinois. In 1966, in reaction to the popularity of the slogan "Black Power" coined by Stokely Carmichael, Rockwell altered the phrase and coined the term "White Power" as a counterslogan.

==== Virginia gubernatorial election campaign (1965) ====
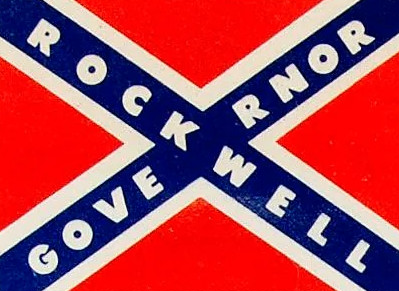
Rockwell's logo for his 1965 Virginia gubernatorial campaign

Rockwell ran as a candidate in the 1965 Virginia gubernatorial election. He planned his run at least a year in advance of his actual run, telling an associate that such a campaign would be useful to inflame the reaction of the Jewish population. He filed for governor on April 20, 1965, running as an independent. Rockwell's campaign promoted white schools, law and order, taxes and welfare, anti-subversive commission, and relocation benefits.

Come election day in November, Rockwell received 5,730 votes (also reported at about 6,500). This was slightly less than 1% of the total vote. While he was initially disappointed and shocked by his showing, only weeks later at a speech he spun it as a positive result, saying that "with a budget of $15,000, with a total press blackout, and with a 'Kosher conservative' [splitting the vote] ... I got 7,000 people to vote for a Nazi."

==== Alex Haley interviews (1965–1966) ====
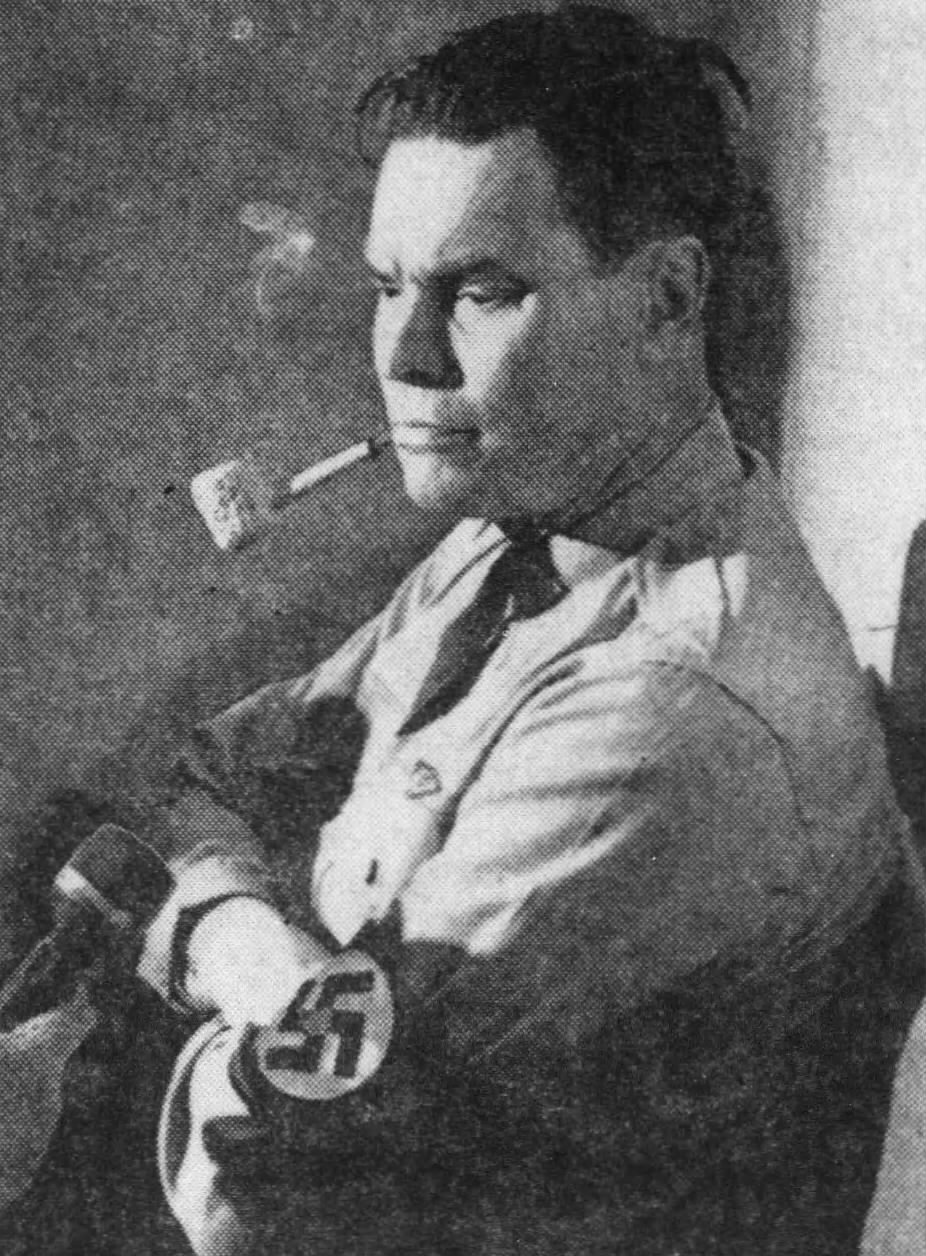
Rockwell during an interview

In 1965, Rockwell was contacted by Playboy magazine, interested in an interview. While Rockwell worried that agreeing to an interview with such a publication might make him seem hypocritical due to his criticisms of pornography, he agreed to it due to the possible publicity it could garner for him. The interview was conducted by Alex Haley at ANP headquarters. Prior to agreeing to the interview, Haley reassured Rockwell that he was not Jewish, but did not tell him that he was Black. Rockwell discussed in the interview his Holocaust denial, his plans to get power, and his views on both Black and Jewish people. Haley did not emotionally respond in the interview. Four more interviews between Rockwell and Haley were conducted over the next year. Rockwell and Haley continued to write to each other following these interviews, with Rockwell addressing his letters to Haley "V.I.N." (Very Important Nigger).

The interview was finally published in April 1966 in Playboy. Rockwell complained that the text had been distorted by a rewriter whom he alleged to be Jewish. The interview was Rockwell's greatest success in broadcasting Holocaust denial to the public, increasing interest and income for his movement, in addition to making Rockwell a wanted speaker within the college circuit. Marlon Brando won an Emmy Award for his portrayal of Rockwell in the adaption of Haley's book Roots: The Saga of an American Family.

=== Party changes (1966–1967) ===
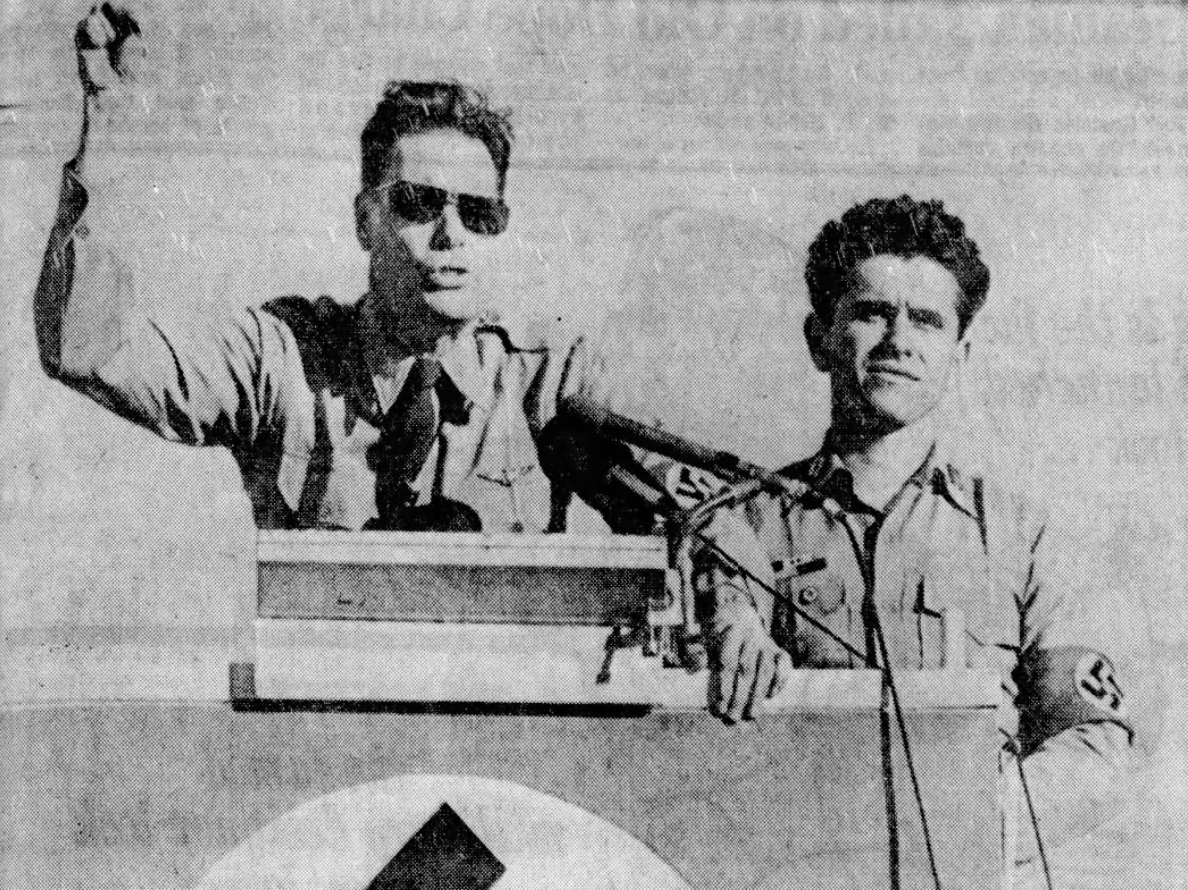
Rockwell (left) giving a speech next to John Patler (right) at a rally in March 1966

John Patler, a young member of the party, helped produce Rockwell's propaganda as an editor for The Stormtrooper Magazine. Patler was ethnically Greek, which led to criticism of his presence in the party. Rockwell liked Patler, whose presence he defended by arguing for a more expanded idea of master race. Koehl and the members who agreed with him viewed this change as heretical; while Koehl was a member of the group and a follower of Rockwell, he was an avid Germanophile and hated any deviation from Hitler's beliefs. Other important members of the group agreed with Koehl, including Frank Drager, Pierce, and Alan Welch. This had the result of forming two factional movements within the ANP: Koehl's Aryan Unity faction, which strictly followed the original racial ideas of Hitler, and Rockwell's White Power faction, which grew towards a broader idea of "White Unity".

Rockwell's group was already small, and wishing to avoid a schism told Patler to keep himself unobtrusive, but refused to go back on this change despite Koehl's objections. On January 1, 1967, the group underwent several changes. Rockwell changed the name of the American Nazi Party to the National Socialist White People's Party (NSWPP), changed the logo to a stylized eagle, and replaced their slogan of Sieg Heil with White Power, all in an effort to Americanize the organization and increase its appeal. These changes, mostly instigated by Patler, were objected to by Koehl. Rockwell also wrote of a new "Ten Points" for the NSWPP, which unlike the tenets of the ANP focused on several racial issues and not just Jews. Patler was eventually and finally expelled by Rockwell from the ANP in March 1967, which Rockwell delegated to Koehl instead of doing it himself.

On March 1, 1967, Rockwell's secretary Barbara von Goetz gave birth to his seventh child, Gretchen. (She had given birth to another daughter five years before, but that baby had died in infancy of Werdnig-Hoffman disease, leaving Rockwell distraught.) This time she decided to only tell him about the baby if it was born healthy. She informed Rockwell later that year. Gretchen died on August 18, 1967, however, also of Werdnig-Hoffman disease, deeply affecting Rockwell.

== Assassination ==
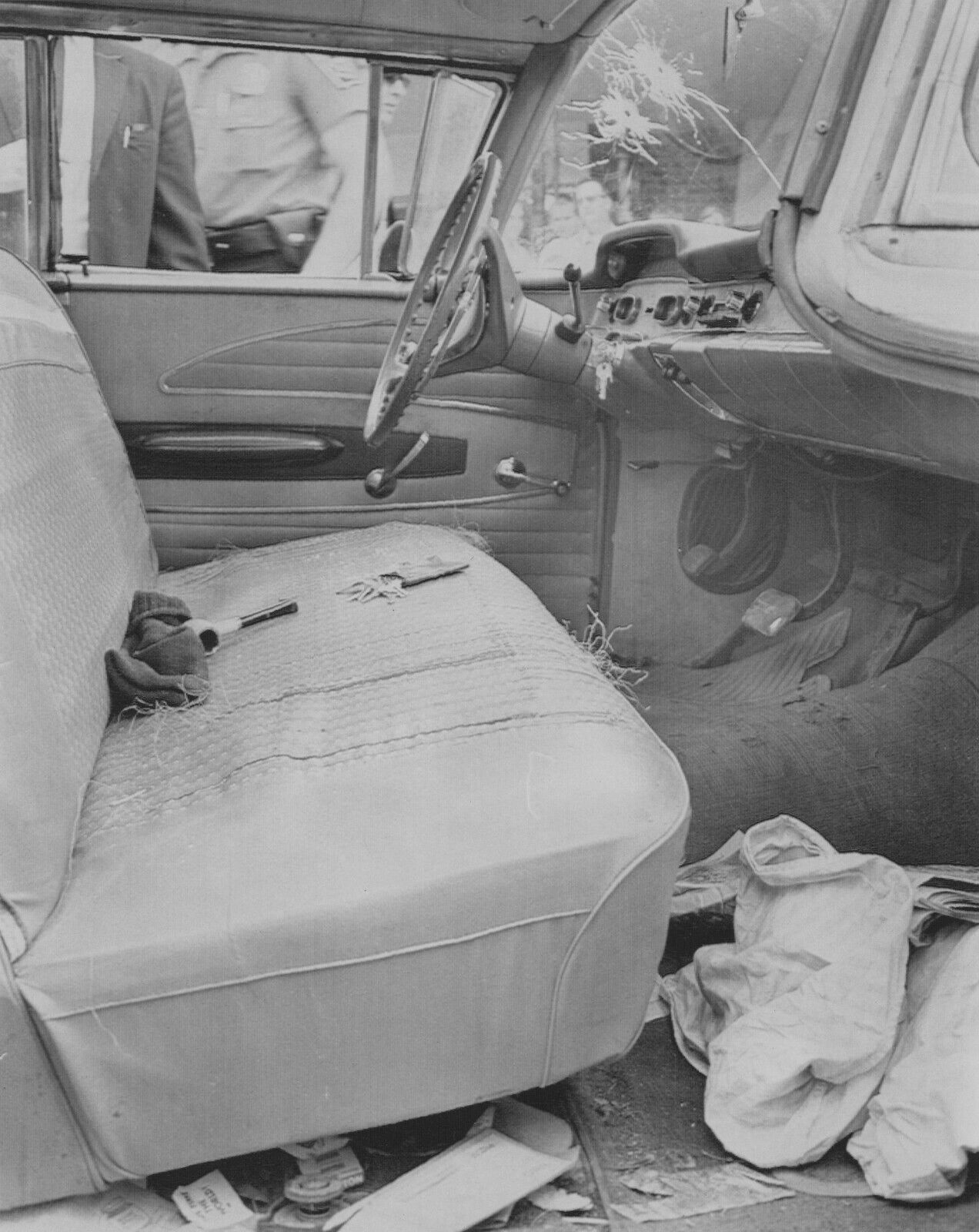
The inside of Rockwell's car following his assassination

On August 25, 1967, five months after being expelled from the party, Patler fatally shot Rockwell, who was leaving a laundromat in Arlington, Virginia, near the party's headquarters. After entering the laundromat, he told the attendant he had forgotten something and went back to his car. After he started the car, two shots were fired; one shot missed, but the other hit Rockwell's chest. Rockwell managed to crawl out of the car and fell onto the pavement. He died there at 12:02 p.m. Arlington police arrested Patler less than two miles (three kilometers) from the place of the shooting, shortly after the shooting, alone.

The police and prosecution argued Patler's motive was to get revenge on Rockwell for expelling him. Patler was convicted of the murder, and sentenced to 20 years in prison. Patler appealed his conviction, and was out on $40,000 bond. His murder conviction was upheld by the Virginia Supreme Court in 1970. With this his bond was revoked and he was ordered to return to prison to carry out his sentence. He appealed again to the U.S. Supreme Court, which unanimously rejected his appeal in May 1972; he was paroled in August 1975, but violated his parole terms a year later and spent six more years in prison. He was later released upon the completion of his sentence.

When the body was released for burial following the autopsy, there was initially a conflict between Rockwell's family and Koehl, the second in command at NSWPP. Federal officials approved a military burial at Culpeper National Cemetery, Rockwell being an honorably discharged veteran. They demanded that no mourners display Nazi insignias and rejected the party's request that there be a military honor guard that was "all-Caucasian"; however, they allowed Rockwell to be buried in Nazi uniform. The funeral commenced on August 29, and with it a uniformed Nazi funeral procession. When they arrived, the entrance to the cemetery was blocked by local, state, and military police flown in by helicopter. The superintendent who ran the cemetery explained to Koehl the ruling, and asked that his men take off their swastikas so they could enter. They refused, and both groups waited for the other to stand down for several hours. The next day, Rockwell's body was secretly cremated by Koehl.

== Views ==
Rockwell regularly praised Adolf Hitler, referring to him as the "White Savior of the twentieth century". He denied the Holocaust and believed that Martin Luther King Jr. was a tool for Jewish communists desiring to rule the white community. In his Playboy interview with Alex Haley, Rockwell stated, "I emphatically deny that there is any valid proof that innocent Jews were systematically murdered by the Nazis." He blamed the civil rights movement on Jews, and viewed most of them as traitors. He viewed black people as a primitive race and supported the resettlement of all African Americans in a new African state to be funded by the U.S. government. More than Jews or black people, he hated homosexuals. He said to a critic that the only group he "would rather gas than Jew Communist traitors" were "queer traitors", and said that if he took power the first issue would be the imprisonment of all gay people. He was agnostic.

Rockwell's views estranged him from his former family and friends. His brother's businesses and family life were heavily damaged by their association with Rockwell, and his relatives and friends drew away from him, shocked by his behavior. Many of them suspected his change in behavior had to do with mental illness. His own father tried repeatedly to convince him to abandon his political views, but failed, with this only resulting in bitter fights. He had little or no contact with either of his ex-wives or his children; he was only regularly in contact with his sister and mother.

Rockwell's final book, White Power, was published shortly after his death. A political manifesto, White Power reflected Rockwell's later moving away from specific ideological Nazism instead to a more broad appealing white supremacy, and abandoned prejudice against white groups that the Nazis had viewed as inferior, e.g. Slavs. White Power uses much harsher terminology than even previous works of his, calling Jews "human parasites", calling for the killing of all non-White peoples and for the enemies of whites to be "annihilated". It blames Jews for inciting black people against the white race, and for what Rockwell called a violent black revolution being experienced by the United States, in an early form of great replacement theory. It encourages white men to "STAND UP AND FIGHT!"; one scholar called it "more than anything else, a call to battle".

Rockwell agreed with many Black Muslims and Black separatists who shared his goal of racial segregation, such as Elijah Muhammad and especially Malcolm X. He also praised black power advocate Hassan Jeru-Ahmed; Hassan openly boasted of the praise he received from Rockwell. Rockwell was present as a guest speaker at a major Black Muslim convention on February 25, 1962, where he praised Elijah Muhammad as "the Adolf Hitler of the black man". In January 1962, Rockwell wrote to his followers in his newspaper The Rockwell Report praising Elijah Muhammad and saying that after talking to them he was "certain that a workable plan for separation of the races could be effected to the satisfaction of all concerned—except the Communist-Jew agitators." Rockwell said that had he been born black he would have been like Malcolm X, and correctly predicted that Malcolm would eventually split from the NOI to form his own movement. Even when Malcolm X ceased being a racial separatist after a pilgrimage to Mecca, Rockwell continued to express admiration for him. Following his assassination in 1965 Rockwell wrote a eulogy for him in his Rockwell Report; he blamed Malcolm X's death on communists.

Inspired by Black Muslims' use of religion to mobilize people, Rockwell sought to collaborate with Christian Identity groups. On June 10, 1964, he met and formed an alliance with Identity minister Wesley A. Swift. Rockwell used religious imagery, depicting himself as a Christ-like martyr who was fighting against the Jews. Nazis found a welcome home in Swift's church and church members found a political outlet in the American Nazi Party. He used party member Ralph Perry Forbes to facilitate this, making him the ANP's official Christian Identity minister in 1965.

== Legacy ==
Rockwell has been described as "the father of American neo-Nazism". He is still a very influential figure on far-right extremists, though he is largely unknown to the American public and failed to "achieve anything close to political power or even a significant following". He was a driving force in promoting Holocaust denial in America. The White Power movement that he spawned was one of his most enduring legacies. Author William H. Schmaltz said of it that: "Gone was the criterion of being Nordic or Aryan; gone was the Nativist, anti-Catholic prejudice of the Ku Klux Klan. Now anyone white and non-Jewish could belong to a worldwide racist movement that had no internal racial or ethnic hierarchy."

After Rockwell's death, the American Nazi Party effectively dissolved, and the American Nazi movement fractured, with the party and its members schisming into several different groups. The party had no formalized succession plan, but in the immediate aftermath, Matt Koehl was declared by agreement of all sixteen leading members to be the next leader of the NSWPP. Koehl changed the NSWPP to align with a more religious outlook on Nazism, and with the change renamed the group the New Order in 1983. Another major successor to Rockwell's movement was created by William Luther Pierce, who left the NSWPP and founded the neo-Nazi group the National Alliance. Pierce later wrote the racist dystopian novel The Turner Diaries, which inspired numerous acts of far-right terrorism. The American Nazi Party moniker was later adopted by a schismatic group led by former ANP member James Warner. Harold Covington founded a new NSWPP in 1994 based on Rockwell's vision.

Rockwell was a source of inspiration for white supremacist David Duke. As a student in high school, when he learned that Rockwell had been murdered, Duke reportedly broke down sobbing and said "The greatest American who ever lived has been shot down and killed." Richard B. Spencer also admired his "shock" tactics, but criticized his usage of a Nazi uniform as "unproductive". White supremacist Matthew Heimbach called Rockwell "one of the most gifted orators of the 20th century", and said Rockwell's writings and speeches were "the things that worked to bring me to National Socialism".

Rockwell has been the subject of two biographies, both released in 1999: American Fuehrer by Frederick J. Simonelli and Hate by William H. Schmaltz.

In Finland, the anti-immigration group Suomen Sisu, which has elected members of parliament, has promoted Rockwell and his works. President of Egypt Gamel Abdel Nasser also publicly praised Rockwell's "anti-Zionist campaign".

== Publications ==
- The Fable of the Ducks and the Hens (1959)
- How to Get Out or Stay Out of the Insane Asylum (1960) (pamphlet)
- In Hoc Signo Vinces (1960) (pamphlet)
- This Time the World (1961) (book)
- White Power (1967) (book)

== See also ==
- John Tyndall (far-right activist)
- List of assassinated American politicians
