= Eunice Weaver =

Brazilian philanthropist

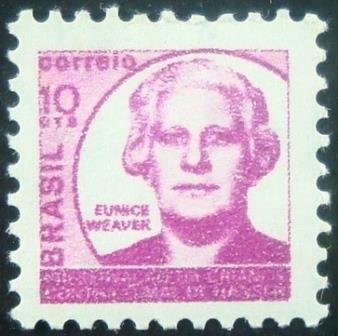
- Eunice Weaver on a 1972 Brazilian postage stamp.
- Born: Eunice de Sousa Gabbi; September 19, 1902; São Manoel
- Died: December 9, 1969 (aged 67); Uruguaiana
- Occupation: Philanthropist
- Known for: Director of leprosy-related charities

Eunice de Sousa Gabbi Weaver (September 19, 1902 – December 9, 1969) was a Brazilian philanthropist. She was a leader of leprosy charities in Brazil from the 1930s to the 1960s.

== Early life ==
Eunice de Sousa Gabbi was born on a coffee farm in São Manoel, the daughter of Henrique Gabbi and Leopoldina Gabbi. Her father was an immigrant from Italy. Eunice Gabbi attended school in Uruguaiana. She trained to be a teacher in São Paulo.

== Career ==
In 1929, Weaver accompanied her husband when he served as a faculty member of the "Floating University of North America", an educational program based in an ocean liner while it traveled around the world. She visited over forty countries, and interviewed Mahatma Gandhi. She studied provisions for leprosy patients along the way, and upon her return to Brazil, she founded the Sociedade de Assistência aos Lázaros (Lazarus Assistance Society), and was president of the Federation of Societies for Assistance to Lepers and for Control of Leprosy, from 1932 until her death in 1969.

Her work gained official support from the Brazilian government in 1935. Hoping to combat leprosy stigma, she founded boarding schools (educandarios) for children whose parents had leprosy. She lectured about her work internationally, including at the International Congress of Leprosy in 1938, in Cairo. In the 1940s she visited the United States to study health charities including those addressing blindness, tuberculosis, polio, and leprosy. She visited the United States often with her husband, to visit his children and speak about her work.

In 1950, Weaver became the first woman to receive Brazil's Ordem Nacional do Mérito (National Order of Merit). She also received honors in Paraguay and Cuba. She was also the first South American to gain the Damien-Dutton Award, presented to her in 1963. In 1972, she was memorialized with a Brazilian postage stamp.

== Personal life ==
Eunice Gabbi married an American missionary educator in Brazil, Charles Anderson Weaver, in 1927, and became stepmother to his four children. She died from a heart attack in 1969, aged 67 years, in Porto Alegre. Her grave is with her husband's, in Rio de Janeiro.

== Legacy ==
In her lifetime, Weaver was compared to an "angel" and a "saint" for her work. In the decades since her death, her efforts have been criticized as part of the program of social isolation of leprosy patients, now known as hansenianos, in Brazil. "Certainly the most horrific aspect of isolation ... was the creation of orphanages for the children of leprosy patients," commented historian Elisabeth Poorman. "The program was led by Eunice Weaver." The educandarios she promoted were known to be sites of abuse, medical experimentation, and overmedication, and many of the adults who were separated from their parents have described the lasting harm they sustained during their institutionalization.
