= Henriette Mertz =

American lawyer and fringe theorist

- Mertz in 1955
- Born: 1896
- Died: August 17, 1985 (aged 88–89)
- Occupation: Patent attorney
- Known for: Fringe archaeological theories

Henriette Mertz (1896 – August 17, 1985) was an American patent attorney from Chicago and a proponent of pseudoarchaeological hyperdiffusionism in relation to ancient American history. She published several controversial books during the 1960s and 1970s relating to the early discovery and settlement of America.

She died on August 17, 1985, in Chicago at 89; her book The Mystic Symbol was published posthumously.

== Career ==
Mertz was a cryptographer for the U.S. Navy during World War II, serving as a lietuenant commander in the Office of Scientific Research and Development. She then worked at the U.S. Copyright Office in Washington, D.C., as a patent lawyer, having earned a criminal law degree from Chicago's John Marshall Law School in 1933. She traveled extensively to locations including the Amazon, the Andes, and Mexico.

== Theories ==
In 1936, Mertz met a man in Mexico who she said "looked to be pure Chinese" but described himself as "Indian". It turned out that his family was originally from China, but had settled and lived in Mexico for many generations. After the war, she read An Inglorious Columbus (1885) by writer Edward P. Vining, which argued that Chinese explorers had founded Mexican culture and religion. To Mertz, this explained the curious case of the Mexican-Chinese-Indian man she had met many years prior. Lacking any training as a historian, she started developing her own theories about the Chinese discovery of the Americas, and decided to self-publish Pale Ink (1953) after the manuscript was rejected by commercial publishers.

=== Bat Creek Stone ===
In 1964, Mertz suggested that a photograph of the Bat Creek inscription had been published upside down. Later Cyrus H. Gordon, scholar of Near Eastern cultures and ancient languages, suggested that the inscriptions were derived from a Hebrew alphabet from the 1st century AD. Today archaeologists consider it a fraud.

=== Greek voyages ===
In her work entitled The Wine Dark Sea, Mertz argues that the locations described in the Odyssey were based on ancient navigational knowledge, and that Odysseus had sailed through the Strait of Gibraltar and into the North Atlantic. Mertz proposes that Odysseus reached North Africa (the land of the lotus-eaters), the Strait of Messina (where he encountered volcanos and the Cyclopes), then sailed into the Atlantic. She places the Circe episode on the Macaronesian island of Madeira, then has Odysseus cross the ocean to the Caribbean (home to the Wandering Rocks), and eventually north to the Bay of Fundy where he faced Scylla and Charybdis. Eventually, the hero sails a raft back across the Atlantic, landing on Santa Maria in the Azores (where Mertz locates the cave of Calypso), before finally returning to the Mediterranean.

Geographer George F. Carter expressed admiration for Mertz's "courage, imagination, and energy" and cautions against dismissing her unconventional interpretation of the Odyssey, comparing her to Heinrich Schliemann, whose literal inteprepation of Homer led to the discovery of the remains of ancient Troy. Cartographer Gerald Roe Crone said that Mertz's "argument is skilfully presented...though the central theme is difficult to accept."

=== Chinese voyages ===
In Pale Ink (initially self-published in 1953), Mertz proposed that two accounts of Chinese travels to Fusang—one found in the Shan Hai Jing (which Mertz dates to 2250 BC) and the other by Buddhist missionary Hui Shen in 499 AD—describe visits to the American continent. As supporting evidence she proposed that the Milk River inscriptions were Chinese glyphs made by one of the exploration parties. According to author David Hatcher Childress, Mertz also interpreted Fusang as meaning "fir trees" in Chinese, and ruminated that they might refer to the fir trees of British Columbia. In her book, Mertz also proposed that Quetzalcoatl was Hui Shen, the 5th century Buddhist traveler to Fusang.

About Mertz's hypotheses, sinologist Joseph Needham writes in a footnote that "the proposed identities in general require a heroic suspension of disbelief". Publisher and anthropologist Harry Lewis places Pale Ink as part of a "long tradition of trying to explain the pre-Columbian history of America in terms of outside influence" and dismisses Mertz's assumptions as "totally absurd". Geographer George F. Carter, in reviewing the 1953 manuscript which Mertz sent to him, takes the view that "she had something, but...she overran her evidence."

Pale Ink was originally self-published in 1953, then reissued by Swallow Press in 1972. In 1974 it was republished by Ballantine Books as Gods from the Far East.

=== Atlantis ===
Mertz speculated that the "lost" island of Atlantis described by Plato had been located in the Atlantic Ocean near The Bahamas. She believed that an earthquake had pushed the island into the North American mainland, where it was inundated by a tsunami which devastated its inhabitants. She proposed that the land east of the Mississippi River and south of the Ohio River had all once been Atlantis.

== Selected works ==
- Pale Ink:
  - — (1953). Pale Ink: Two Ancient Records of Chinese Exploration in America. (1st publication)
  - — (1972). Pale Ink: Two Ancient Records of Chinese Exploration in America. Swallow Press. ISBN 0-8040-0599-0. (2nd publication)
  - — (1974). Gods from the Far East: How the Chinese Discovered America. Seattle, Washington: Ballantine Books. ISBN 0-345-23964-4. (3rd publication)
- — (1957). The Nephtali: One Lost Tribe. ASIN B0007EYTXS.
- — (1964). The Wine Dark Sea: Homer's Heroic Epic of the North Atlantic. ASIN B0006CHG68.
- — (1976). Atlantis: Dwelling Place of the Gods. ISBN 0-9600952-3-3.
- The Mystic Symbol:
  - — (1986). The Mystic Symbol: Mark of the Michigan Mound Builders. Global Books. ISBN 0-9617235-0-5. (1st publication)
  - — (2004). The Mystic Symbol: Mark of the Michigan Mound Builders. Ancient America Magazine and Hayriver Press. ISBN 0-9617235-0-5. (2nd publication)
