= Hamlet: The Drama of Vengeance =

1921 film

Hamlet
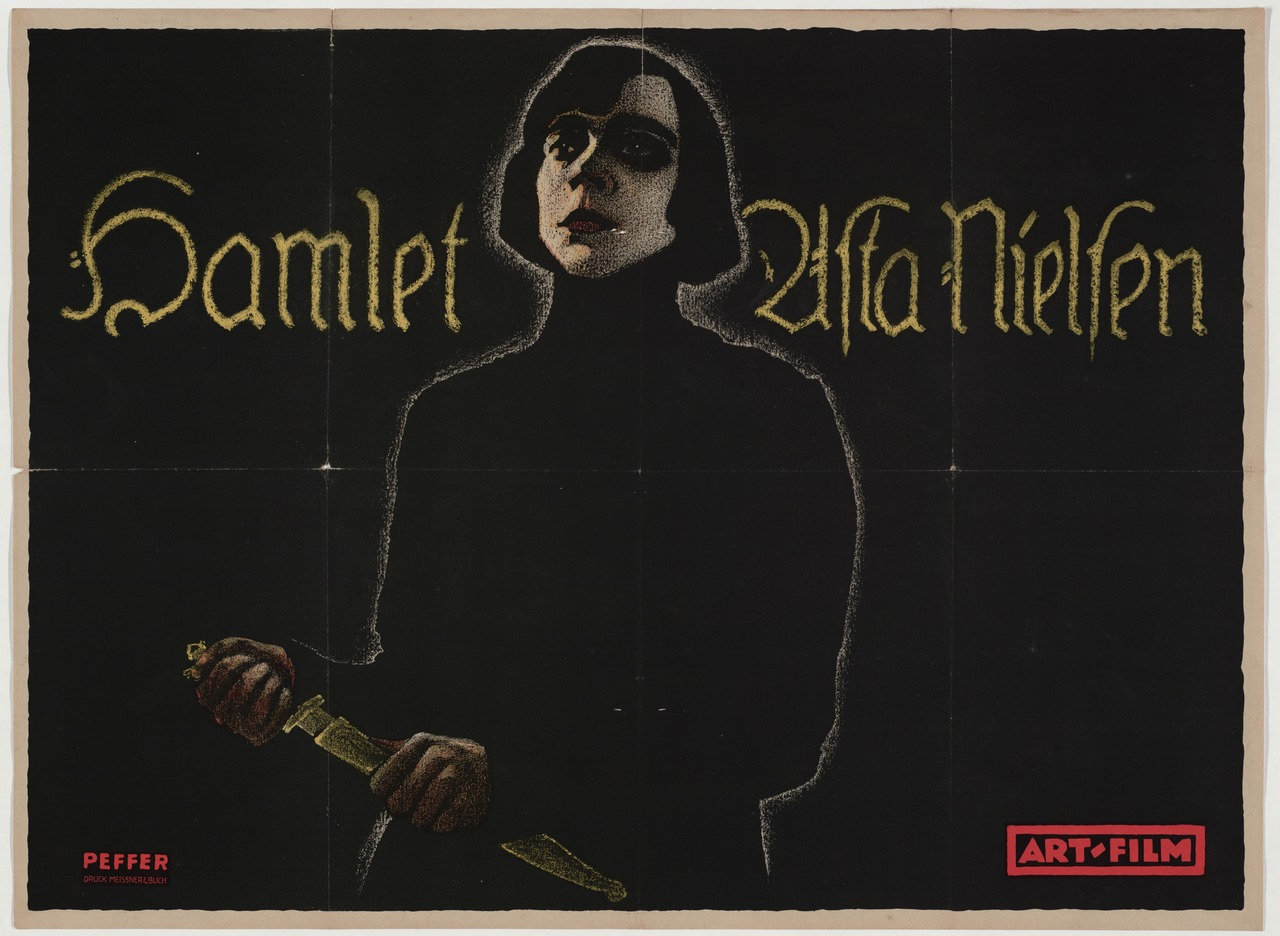
- Directed by: Svend Gade; Heinz Schall
- Written by: Erwin Gepard (manuscript); E. Vining (book)
- Based on: Hamlet; 1599 play by William Shakespeare
- Produced by: Asta Nielsen
- Starring: Asta Nielsen; Paul Conradi
- Cinematography: Curt Courant; Axel Graatkjær
- Music by: Giuseppe Becce
- Production company: Art-Film GmbH
- Distributed by: Asta Films
- Release date: 1921
- Running time: 131 minutes
- Country: Germany
- Languages: Silent; German intertitles

Hamlet: The Drama of Vengeance (1921) by Svend Gade and Heinz Schall

Hamlet, or Hamlet: The Drama of Vengeance, (Note: German: Hamlet: Ein Rachedrama) is a 1921 German film adaptation of the William Shakespeare play Hamlet starring and produced by Danish silent film actress Asta Nielsen. It was directed by Svend Gade and Heinz Schall. The film was shot at the Johannisthal Studios in Berlin.

In this interpretation, inspired by Edward P. Vining's book The Mystery of Hamlet, Hamlet is born female and disguised as a male to preserve the lineage. The New York Times said the film "holds a secure place in class with the best."

== Plot ==
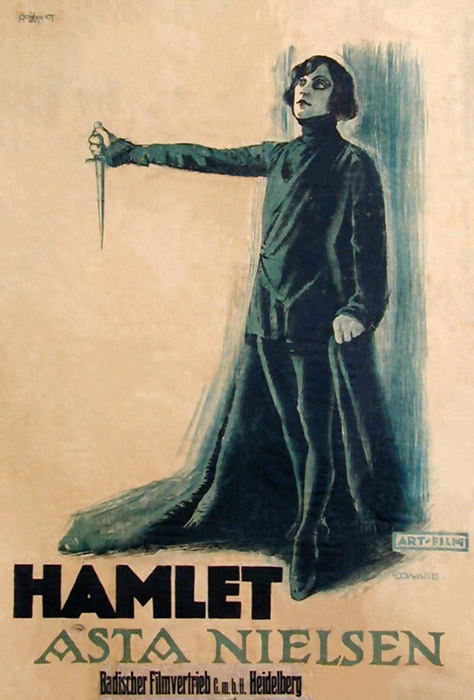
Film poster

The opening titles explain that this film is based on a theory from an American literary researcher: "Hamlet is a woman!"

The prologue: Queen Gertrude of Denmark gives birth to a girl. When she hears that the king has been killed in a battle with Norway, she announces that she has given birth to a boy named Hamlet, as only males can inherent the crown. Then, to the queen's shock, the king comes back home alive. They decide they can't take back the queen's proclamation, and raise Hamlet as a boy.

Part one: the solitary Prince Hamlet grows up, and attends the University of Wittenberg. Hamlet, wistful, stares out the window at people socializing, and an intertitle describes the prince as having clipped wings. But Hamlet does make friends with Horatio, whom Hamlet is visibly attracted to, and Fortinbras from Norway.

Meanwhile, the king's brother Claudius kills the king with a venomous snake and inherits the crown.

Part two: Hamlet returns home and is outraged to find that Claudius and Gertrude are not mourning Hamlet's father, but instead are celebrating their upcoming marriage. Hamlet talks to the groundskeeper who found the king's body, who reveals there was a snake from the castle dungeon nearby. Hamlet investigates the dungeon and finds Claudius's dagger. Hamlet decides to investigate further, and to feign madness so that Claudius would not consider the prince a threat. Acting mad, Hamlet carves a faux crown for Claudius, then makes it disappear with sleight of hand.

Part three: Horatio lies with his head on Hamlet's lap. Horatio reveals that he's attracted to the noblewoman Ophelia and Hamlet becomes jealous and decides to go woo Ophelia. Hamlet caresses Ophelia and kisses her fingers and arm. Then, alone, Hamlet says: "Now, Horatio, you are mine".

Part four: Hamlet's antagonistic feelings towards Ophelia leak out: the prince brushes her off in person and writes a letter calling her a numbskull.

Hamlet's father urges the prince to avenge him in a dream. Hamlet doesn't have the will to kill, however, and instead considers suicide, before saying: "Too weak to kill, and too weak to take my own life!" To determine if Claudius is guilty, Hamlet has an acting troupe perform a play in which a king's brother kills a king. When the king stops the production, Hamlet is convinced, running to Claudius's room with a sword. But Hamlet finds Claudius praying, and decides not to kill him. Later, Hamlet visits the queen, and spots someone moving behind a curtain. Hamlet stabs and kills him, thinking it is Claudius, but it's Ophelia's father Polonius.

Part five: Claudius realizes Hamlet intended to kill him, and sends Hamlet to Norway with two companions to see Fortinbras. Claudius gives the companions a secret letter instructing Fortinbras to have Hamlet beheaded. Hamlet, however, discovers the note, and cleverly changes it. When, ultimately, Fortinbras reads the note and has Hamlet's shocked traveling companions dragged away to be beheaded, Hamlet smiles. Hamlet tells Fortinbras about Claudius's misdeeds and Fortinbras vows to help usurp Claudius.

Part six: Ophelia has gone mad after her father's death. She drowns herself, devastating her brother Laertes and Horatio. Later, Claudius is drinking merrily when, to his shock, Hamlet appears. Hamlet encourages the king and his companions to keep drinking, until they are in a drunken slumber. Hamlet sets fire to the room. Claudius wakes and fights with Hamlet. Hamlet escapes and leaves Claudius and his associates to die. When Gertrude discovers what happened, she conspires with Laertes to get revenge. She sets up a duel between the two, and poisons both Laertes's sword and a drink intended for Hamlet. During the duel, the queen accidentally drinks the poisoned drink. She calls out, and Hamlet turns. Laertes stabs Hamlet in the chest. Horatio goes to the prince and starts to unbutton Hamlet's top, but Hamlet stops him. Hamlet collapses in Horatio's arms, and dies. Horatio, caressing Hamlet, realizes Hamlet has breasts. "Only in death is your secret revealed!" and "Too late, my love, too late!" Horatio kisses Hamlet's lips and cries. Then, he covers Hamlet's body. Fortinbras arrives, and is saddened, describing Hamlet as having broken wings. His men bear Hamlet's body away.

== Cast ==
- Asta Nielsen as Prince Hamlet
- Paul Conradi as King Hamlet
- Mathilde Brandt as Queen Gertrude
- Eduard von Winterstein as King Claudius
- Heinz Stieda as Horatio
- Hans Junkermann as Polonius
- Anton De Verdier as Laertes
- Lilly Jacobson as Ophelia
- Fritz Achterberg as Fortinbras

== Background ==
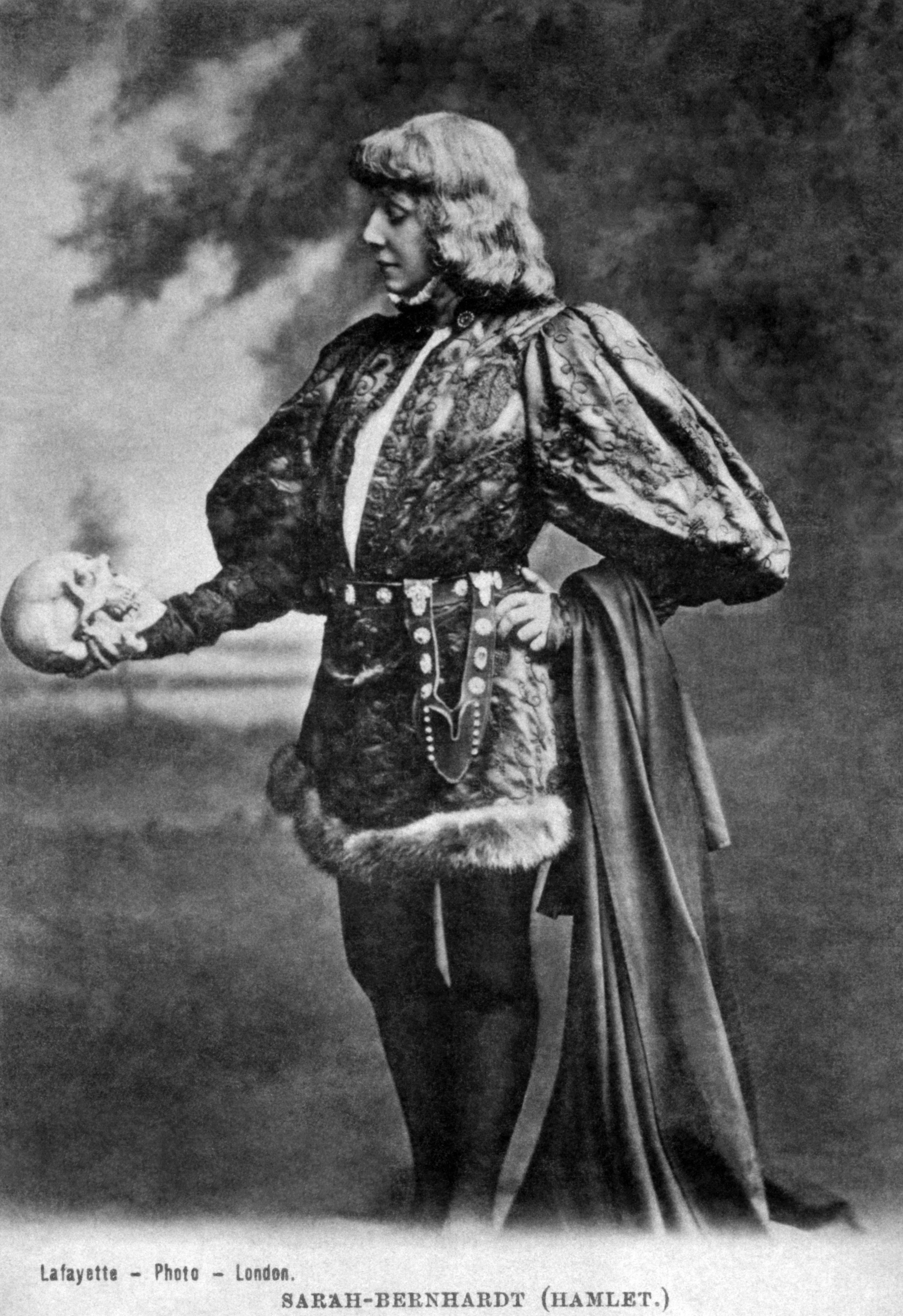
Sarah Bernhardt (pictured) and Asta Nielsen were part of a line of woman Hamlets

Asta Nielsen was not the first woman to play the role of Hamlet. Sarah Bernhardt, for example, played the role on both stage and in a 1900 short film, becoming the first person to ever play Hamlet on film. Other women to play the part on stage include Sarah Siddons, Julia Glover, Charlotte Cushman, and Alice Marriott.

The film was inspired by the 1881 book The Mystery of Hamlet: An Attempt to Solve an Old Problem by American writer Edward P. Vining, who argues that Prince Hamlet is a fundamentally feminine character and best conceived as being secretly a woman.

== Reception ==
The New York Times, in a contemporaneous review, called it an "extraordinary work", said "It holds a secure place in the class with the best", and praised Asta Nielsen's performance. The Times also called it one of the 10 best films of the year.
