= Hyperdiffusionism =

Pseudoarchaeological hypothesis

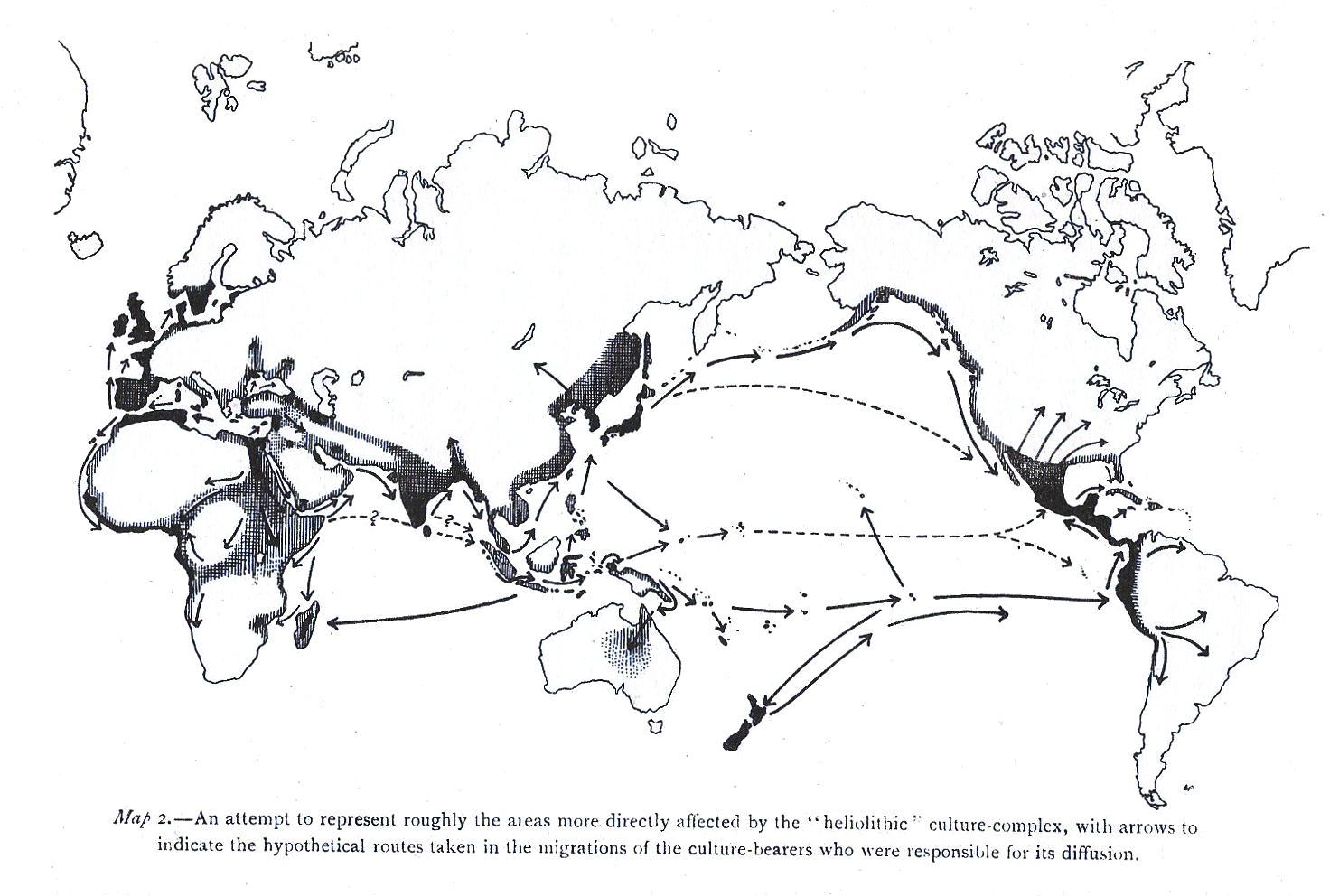
Grafton Elliot Smith: Map of Hyperdiffusionism from Egypt, 1929

Hyperdiffusionism is a pseudoarchaeological hypothesis that postulates that certain historical technologies or ideas were developed by a single people or civilization and then spread to other cultures. Thus, all great civilizations that engage in what appear to be similar cultural practices, such as the construction of pyramids, derived them from a single common progenitor. According to proponents of hyperdiffusion, examples of hyperdiffusion can be found in religious practices, cultural technologies, megalithic monuments, and lost ancient civilizations.

The idea of hyperdiffusionism differs from trans-cultural diffusion in several ways. One is the fact that hyperdiffusionism is usually not testable due to its pseudo-scientific nature. Also, unlike trans-cultural diffusion, hyperdiffusionism does not use trading and cultural networks to explain the expansion of a society within a single culture; instead, hyperdiffusionists claim that all major cultural innovations and societies derive from one (usually lost) ancient civilization. One common hyperdiffusionist hypothesis states that the similarities among disparate civilizations were inherited from the civilization of a lost continent, such as Atlantis or Lemuria, which has since sunk into the sea. Egypt is also commonly featured in hyperdiffusionist narratives, either as an intermediate civilization that inherited its culture from such a lost continent and in turn passed it on to other civilizations or as a source of hyperdiffused elements itself.

== Key proponents ==
=== Frank Collin, also known as Frank Joseph ===
Francis Joseph Collin (born November 3, 1944) is an American former political activist and Midwest coordinator with the American Nazi Party, later known as the National Socialist White People's Party. After being ousted for being partly Jewish (which he denied), in 1970, Collin founded the National Socialist Party of America. (N.S.P.A.) After Collin was convicted and sentenced for child molestation, he lost his position in the party. He subsequently wrote many books and articles in support of Burrows Cave, an alleged cache of ancient treasure from many parts of the Old World in an unrevealed location, supposedly discovered by Russell Burrows in southern Illinois." In 1987, he had his first New Age book published, The Destruction of Atlantis: Compelling Evidence of the Sudden Fall of the Legendary Civilization.

He wrote articles for Fate magazine, and he was also the editor of The Ancient American magazine. The Ancient American focuses on what it says is evidence of ancient, pre-Columbian transoceanic contact between the Old World and North America, with the implication that all complex aspects of North America's indigenous cultures must have originated on other continents. The magazine's claims are similar to discredited nineteenth century theories, and as a result, they are considered dubious or exploitative by scholars.

=== British school of diffusionism ===
The British school of diffusionism was an extreme form of diffusionism. Notable proponents included Grafton Elliot Smith and W. J. Perry, who believed Egypt was the source of all civilisation. The so-called Heliolithic Culture hypothesized by Grafton Elliot Smith includes a wide range of hyperdiffused cultural practices such as megaliths and sun worship (the name was coined by Smith himself from helios, "sun", and lith, "stone") and the similar designs and methods of the construction of such pieces are described as having a linear geographical distribution. These heliolithic cultures can refer to religious customs that share distinctive practices, such as the worship of a Solar Deity. As this trope is seen in numerous belief systems, Smith believes that it is diffused from one ancient civilization.

According to G. Elliot Smith, Egypt was the source of civilization for Asia, India, China, and the Pacific, and eventually, it was the source of civilization for America. Smith sees Mummification as a prime example of how religious customs prove the diffusion of a single ancient culture. He believes that only an advanced civilization, such as Egypt, could create such a peculiar belief, and that it then spread by way of ancient mariners.

Early Man Distribution refers to Smith's belief that Modern Man is derived from "six well-defined types of mankind," which comprise the sources of Earth's population. The six types of mankind are the Aboriginal Australians, Negroes, Mongols, and the Mediterranean, Alpine, and Nordic races.

=== Carl Whiting Bishop ===
Carl Whiting Bishop in the 1930s and the 1940s produced a series of articles arguing hyperdiffusionism in explaining the expansion of technology into China. Among the scholars influenced by Bishop were Owen Lattimore, who was intrigued by Bishop's emphasis on geography as a shaping factor in Chinese civilization and his emphasis on field work rather than library research.

=== Charles Hapgood ===
In Charles Hapgood's book Maps of the Ancient Sea Kings, he concludes that ancient land formations gave way to hyperdiffusionism and the diffusion "of a true culture." This culture could have been more advanced than that of Egypt or Greece because it was the foundation of a worldwide culture. Hapgood also suggests that the Three-age system of archeology is irrelevant due to primitive cultures co-existing with modern societies.

According to Hapgood, the pyramids in South America and Mexico may be indicative of cultural practices which the builders of them shared with ancient Egyptian civilization. He theorized that the ancient Maya were strongly influenced by the diffusion of ancient Egyptian social and political cultures, and that they became a civilized culture due to the migration of citizens from Atlantis after that island sank. For example, he says "How did the Mayans achieve such precise results...the knowledge may have, of course, been derived by the Babylonians or the Egyptians". It is also said that Mayan artifacts resemble those of a classical culture, possibly Greece. This plays into Plato's Account of the ancient battle for Atlantis, which led to the downfall of the civilization.

Hapgood finds evidence of ancient Egyptian "expression" in the writings of Hinduism and Buddhism. He notes that in these writings there appear deities that are similar to those worshiped throughout the world. Furthermore, there are myths and creation stories that are said to have a common origin in Egypt.

=== Barry Fell ===
Mystery Hill, or America's Stonehenge, is the site which Barry Fell refers to as the primary basis of his hypothesis that ancient Celts once populated New England. Mystery Hill, Fell believes, was a place of worship for the Celts and Phoenician mariners. These ancient mariners, called the Druids, are said to have populated Europe at the same time. He hypothesizes that they were the ancient settlers of North America. Also, he believes that what he describes as inscriptions on stone and tablet artifacts from this site are in an ancient language derived from common sources of the Goidelic languages.

These authors describe hyperdiffusionism as the driving force behind the apparent cultural similarities and population distribution among all civilizations. Hapgood's hypothesis states that one specific civilization is responsible for similar cultural practices in all other civilizations. Smith says that religions are proof of hyperdiffusionism, as similar worship ceremonies and symbols recur in geographically separated societies. Also, Smith believes that the Earth's population is made up of six types of humans, who diffused across the Earth's continents by virtue of their skin color. Finally, Fell asserts that ancient mariners, such as Druids and Phoenicians, traveled from Europe and comprised the early population of ancient America.

== Critiques ==
=== Alexander Goldenweiser ===
Alexander Goldenweiser in Culture: The Diffusion Controversy stated that there are reasons for believing that culture may arise independently rather than being transmitted. In addition, Goldenweiser insists that behavior is primitive and that cultural similarities may arise simply because they are reflections of adaptive traits that all human beings have evolved. Goldenweiser disagrees with the theory of hyperdiffusionism, stating that "culture is not contagious" and that the data fails to support the theory.

=== Stephen Williams ===
Stephen Williams uses the phrase "Fantastic Archaeology" to describe the archeological theories and discoveries which he defines as "fanciful archaeological interpretations". These interpretations usually lack artifacts, data, and testable theories to back up the claims made.

In his chapter "Across The Sea They Came," Williams introduces a few hyperdiffusionists, their discoveries, and how they "tested" artifacts, beginning with Harold S. Gladwin who made his "fantastic" discoveries at an Arizona Pueblo site, Gila Pueblo Archaeological Foundation. Gladwin favored the diffusion theories which later influenced his methodologies for dating the artifacts at the site. This belief led him to ignore the data that was found at the Folsom site in his chronology as it made his "Man descended from Asia into the New World" theory impossible. The section continues with Cyclone Covey and Thomas W. Bent, specifically their publications on the Tucson Artifacts and their theory that ancient Romans traveled to Arizona. Williams pokes fun at this theory in his book Fantastic Archaeology, and criticizes the authors for failing to explain exactly how and why these artifacts were found in Arizona, and focusing their attention instead only on the artifacts themselves and their similarities to Roman artifacts. Concluding, Williams points out in the chapter how hyperdiffusionists fail to recognize solid archaeological research methods and/or ignore conflicting data and contextual evidence. They are "tailoring their finds with any similar chronology or in-depth linguistic analysis that fits into their scenarios".

=== Alice Kehoe ===
Alice Beck Kehoe says that diffusionism is a "grossly racist ideology". Although she agrees that diffusion of culture can occur through contact and trading, she disagrees with the theory that all civilization came from one superior ancient society.

Kehoe explores the "independent invention" of works and techniques using the example of boats. Ancient peoples could have used their boat technology to make contact with new civilizations and exchange ideas. Moreover, the use of boats is a testable theory, which can be evaluated by recreating voyages in certain kinds of vessels, unlike hyperdiffusionism. Kehoe concludes with the theory of transoceanic contact and makes clear that she is not asserting a specific theory of how and when cultures diffused and blended, but is instead offering a plausible, and testable, example of how civilizational similarities may have arisen without hyperdiffusionism, namely by independent invention and maritime contact.

== See also ==
- Burrows Cave
- Panbabylonism
- Pre-Columbian trans-oceanic contact theories
- Thor Heyerdahl
