= Burrows Cave =

Alleged cave site

Coordinates: 38°44′N 88°5′W

Burrows Cave is the name given to an alleged cave site in Southern Illinois reputedly discovered by Russell E. Burrows in 1982 which he claimed contained many ancient artifacts. Because of the many inconsistencies and lack of evidence for his claims of discovery and findings, the cave, which has never been located, is considered a hoax by archaeologists and anthropologists.

== Russell E. Burrows ==
Russell E. Burrows, born in 1935, is a former Illinois prison guard and Korean War veteran. Burrows claims to have studied two years as an archaeology major at West Virginia University between circa 1953-1955. This claim has not been independently verified.

== Location ==
Burrows claimed that the cave was located near the Embarras River in Richland County. During this time, Burrows lived in Olney, Illinois, which is a short distance away from the alleged cave site. Burrows never revealed the precise location and claimed it was because he believed that people would rob the cave of its ancient treasures.

== Discovery ==
Frank Collin, a Nazi and fringe author writing under the name Frank Joseph, was in the Pontiac Correctional Facility in Illinois while Burrows was working there as a prison guard and later wrote articles and books about Burrows with differing and conflicting details. Both versions agree that Burrows claimed to have been a pothunter searching for artifacts near the Embarrass River. In Collin's first version Burrows was using a metal detector which started to oscillate rapidly and he fell into a vertical narrow pit. Both versions describe him finding long corridors, a series of sealed portals, statues, mummies, bronze weapons, diamonds, parchment scrolls, etc. He also claimed to have found portraits which, according to Joseph, showed "an impossible mix of apparent Romans, Phoenicians, Hebrews, Christians, American Indians, and even Black Africans".

In the second version described by Joseph, Burrows finds a 15 foot natural cave entrance which he thought was covered with Native American inscriptions. Trying to remove these, the wall broke, revealing stone steps lined with oil lamps and the remains of torches. The rest of Joseph's report is the same as the first.

== Cave as a "Tomb" ==
Burrows claims that the cave was a tomb that was meant to hold the ancient artifacts of the dead. Currently, nobody outside Burrows's immediate circle has claimed to have been inside the cave. Anthropologists and archaeologists have not been able to conduct scientific research on the cave due to Burrows' intense secrecy. Many of Burrow’s so-called artifacts have been revealed as forgeries. The cave and its artifacts are widely considered to be a hoax or fraud, even among proponents of other pseudoarchaeological theories such as Barry Fell.

== Artifacts ==
Burrows claimed that the artifacts within the cave were ancient and diverse. He reported that there were life-sized gold statues, gold coffins, mummies, pagan idols, weapons, diamonds, coins, portraits, burial urns, scrolls, swords, weaponry, and suits of armor. Many of these treasures have never been inspected by archaeologists or anthropologists due to Burrows' extreme secrecy. Although, perhaps the artifacts he is best known for are the carved stone tablets with writing in various unknown languages, many with image depictions. The stone tablets are said to represent Old World people, such as Romans, Hebrews, Egyptians, Sumerians, Greeks and Phoenicians. Thousands of these tablets have been sold to private collectors.

== Media ==
Burrows Cave was one of the subjects in the show America Unearthed, in season 2, episode 5 and on the show Holy Grail in America on the History Channel.

Thomas Emerson, the Illinois state archaeologist and former head of the Illinois Historic Preservation Agency, warned that the claims being made by Burrows cave proponents were sensational, and not backed by evidence.

With no evidence of the cave and its existence, many archaeologists quickly dismissed Burrows and the alleged cave.

== Phoenician ship scenario ==
Until about 1993, the predominant claims about Burrows Cave involved a Phoenician ship. Part of the evidence for this claim involved a stone tablet claiming to depict a Phoenician ship vessel found in Burrows cave. Frank Joseph, a key figure involved with the Burrows Cave, reproduced this claim in his book The Lost Treasure of King Juba: The Evidence of Africans in America before Columbus. Alongside this claim, he included a legitimate image of a Phoenician vessel and combined it with the picture of the alleged Phoenician ship from Burrows Cave. In doing so, he cropped the image from the Burrows stone making the paddle end of a steering oar unidentifiable but leaving the steering oars that are shown on what he calls (and the artist depicts as) the prow of the boat. This would have been unnoticeable, except Joseph included steering oars at both ends of the ship on this tablet, which is impossible in real life. Essentially, this mistake made by Joseph contributed to the belief in inaccurate claims, until it was ultimately squashed by critics.

The anthropologist and geographer George F. Carter, a supporter of the concept of trans-cultural diffusion, commented on the image saying

"The 'author' did not recognize the paired oars, and hung an 'impossible' oar over the bow. All others equally botched up. Fanciful stern pieces...Oar over bow - crude fakery by an ignoramus in the world of ships."

== Dating ==
Up until around 1993 the details discussed by Burrows and Joseph suggested that the cave was part of a mid-first millennium colony trading Michigan copper to the Old World. This changed when Ancient American magazine, a publication that asserts the events in the Book of Mormon took place in North America, began to publish articles about the cave. At that point Burrows started to publish photographs of Judeo-Christian artefacts in Ancient American, claiming that he had not revealed them because he feared ridicule. Joseph argued that the colonizers using the cave had witnessed Jesus's crucifixion.
