= George F. Carter =

American anthropologist and geographer

- Born: George Francis Carter; April 6, 1912; San Diego, California, U.S.
- Died: March 16, 2004 (aged 91); Bryan, Texas, U.S.

Academic background
- Education: San Diego State College; University of California, Berkeley (BA, PhD)

Academic work
- Discipline: Anthropology, Archeology, Geography
- Institutions: San Diego State College; Johns Hopkins University; Texas A&M University

George Francis Carter (April 6, 1912 – March 16, 2004) was an American professor of geography who taught at Johns Hopkins University and later Texas A&M University. Carter had a background in anthropology and conducted archaeological excavations in Southern California. He is best known for supporting the theories of trans-cultural diffusion and early human settlement of the Americas.

== Early life and education ==
Carter was born in San Diego, California on 6 April 1912. As a teenager, he expressed interest in anthropology and began to spend much of his free time at the San Diego Museum of Man. At the age of fifteen, Carter befriended the archaeologist Malcolm Jennings Rogers, who was the museum's curator. Rogers allowed the young Carter to volunteer at the museum, and in the summer of 1930, Carter accompanied Rogers on a five-week expedition to San Nicolas Island, where they excavated numerous sites. The following autumn, Carter began classes at San Diego State College. He would eventually transfer to the University of California at Berkeley and earn a B.A. in anthropology in 1934. While at Berkeley, Carter was able to take classes with the noted cultural anthropologist Alfred L. Kroeber, who had been a student of Franz Boas.

== San Diego Museum of Man ==
Immediately after graduating, Carter was hired by the San Diego Museum of Man and began working with his old mentor Malcolm Jennings Rogers. The two conducted field work on the coasts of Southern California and in the Mojave Desert. While surveying in 1937-1938 near Silver Lake in the Mojave, Carter found a fluted projectile point which he recognized to be Folsom. Up until this time, nothing of the Folsom tradition had been found in California, and Carter wanted to document and publish the find at once. Rogers was not comfortable rushing the publication and preferred to gather as much data about the projectile point as possible. Aside from the publication issues, Carter and Rogers soon found themselves at odds regarding the approximate dates of human occupation for the Silver Lake area. Rogers thought occupation dated back to only 4,000 years ago. Carter pushed the date back to 40,000 years ago, using the geology of the area to support his estimation. This disagreement led to a rift between Rogers and Carter which resulted in Carter's eventual dismissal from the Museum of Man.

== Later career and death ==
Bouncing back from his dismissal, Carter was quickly hired by San Diego State College in 1939 as a part-time teacher before he returned to Berkeley to pursue a PhD in geography. He studied under Carl Sauer and completed his degree in 1941. During World War II, Carter moved to Washington, D.C. to work as an analyst for the Office of Strategic Services. In 1943, he left the OSS to teach geography at Johns Hopkins University. Summers between the semesters, Carter would return to San Diego to conduct archaeological excavations, seeking to prove that man had inhabited the Americas at a much earlier date than accepted by mainstream scholars. In 1957, Carter's findings were published in his book Pleistocene Man at San Diego, in which he describes the climate of Southern California during the Pleistocene and the accompanying archaeological sites, some of which Carter dated to the upper Wisconsin glaciation. Critics dismissed much of Carter's claims for early inhabitance, questioning his dating techniques and the possibility that most of the lithic artifacts were actually geofacts. Throughout the 1960s to the 1980s, Carter continued to publish papers and articles dealing with hyperdiffusionism and the early Peopling of the Americas.

In 1967, Carter left Johns Hopkins for Texas A&M University, where he was a distinguished professor of geography until 1978, retiring to become a professor emeritus. Carter died on 16 March 2004.

== Earlier Than You Think ==
In 1980, Carter published Earlier than You Think: A Personal View of Man in America. The book describes Carter's evidence for humans arriving in North America approximately 100,000 years ago. Much of the information presented had already been published by Carter in the past, but technological advances allowed for a new dating technique called amino acid dating to be used on ancient human remains.

Amino acid dating was pioneered by Jeffry Bada, who at the time was a geochemist at the Scripps Institution of Oceanography. The new technique allowed bones to be dated by extracting their protein. Learning of this new means of dating, Carter selected some skulls from the San Diego Museum of Man to be tested. The skulls were excavated on the California coast by M.J. Rogers in 1929, and the museum had them dated at 5,000 to 7,000 years old. Bada tested the specimens in 1974, and the dates came back ranging from 20,000 to 70,000 years ago. Carter saw this as definitive proof of the early populating of the Americas.

Carter also attacks the mainstream archaeological establishment throughout the book, claiming that some scholars are closed-minded and too caught up in the generally accepted archaeological theories to accept his evidence.

=== Criticism of dating ===
Critics quickly refuted Bada's results. When using amino acid racemization to date bones, one must know the approximate temperature the bones were exposed to while buried. Additionally, the stratigraphy of the bones suggested dates around 10,000 years ago rather than 70,000.

In December 1984, Bada came forward and retracted all the dates of bones gleaned from amino acid dating. Newer methods of dating, such as accelerator mass spectrometry gave the same bones dates of less than 10,000 years.

== Hyperdiffusionism ==
Carter was a proponent of hyperdiffusionism, or the theory that all major inventions and cultures can be traced back to one original culture. For example, in Pleistocene Man at San Diego, Carter proposes that the lithic technology found in Southern California was brought there from Asia. Carter thought that ancient people had reached the New World by boat and spread their technologies and cultures to the Native Americans already living there. He cites Hannes Lindemann's solo crossing of the Atlantic in a dugout canoe as evidence that humans could in fact have made the same journey in past. Carter also mentions the Polynesians' and Vikings' maritime abilities as support.

Carter believed that independent invention of the same item was a rarity. He claimed that the probability of something being independently invented was fifty percent. Therefore, the probably of the same thing being independently invented elsewhere was twenty-five percent. This meant that the probability of humans independently inventing the same tools all over the world was very low.

== Controversies ==
=== Artifacts vs. geofacts ===
Mainstream archaeology scholars dismissed many of Carter's lithic artifacts to be geofacts, rocks that have a similar appearance to human-worked stone tools due to natural weathering processes. Carter's theories about the early peopling of the New World could have been influencing his observations. Because of Carter's tendency to exhibit questionable artifacts as data, some scholars began to call any dubious artifacts "cartifacts".

=== Hyperdiffusionism ===
Most anthropology scholars dismiss hyperdiffusionism for a variety of reasons. The theory assumes that humanity is singularly uninventive and can rarely create tools to meet the challenges of the environment. Hyperdiffusionism also assumes that if artifacts are similar in appearance, they must be related in some manner. Similarities between tool shape, size, and manufacturing processes could simply be coincidental, making it impossible to assume relatedness.

Carter's theory that ancient people visited the New World by boat is possible, but there is no reasonable evidence to support it. For example, the Kensington Runestone, discovered in 1898 in Minnesota, was purportedly left by an exploratory party of Vikings. After many years of research and debates about the stone's authenticity, it was generally dismissed as a hoax.

=== Gay and Marxist Geographers in the Association of American Geographers ===
Upon retirement, Carter penned a short opinion piece in The Professional Geographer, arguing the AAG should not accept not Marxist and gay geography groups into the discipline. He claimed that allowing these groups to participate in the annual meeting opened the door to other groups such as "Whores in Geography, and Russian Communist Geography".

== See also ==
- Trans-cultural diffusion
- Pseudoarchaeology
- Barry Fell
- Calico Early Man Site
