= Helen Elizabeth Shearburn Clark =

New Zealand zoologist

Helen Elizabeth Shearburn Rotman (née Clark; 21 January 1936 – 27 August 2014) was a New Zealand expert on echinoderms, specifically starfish.

She was born in Napier in 1936 and attended Nelson Park Primary School (1943–1948) and Woodford House school (1949–1953).

== Education ==
Her association with echinoderms began while developing a M.Sc. topic in Zoology at Victoria University in Wellington, supervised by Dr. H. B. Fell. This was after being told by a professor that he was "not having women in my department". This led to a focus on Southern Ocean asteroids (starfish). She completed her MSc at VUW in 1961 and her PhD was conferred at the same institution 1969–70. The PhD thesis title was “Revision of the Southern Hemisphere Asteroidea Order Paxillosida” and her first scientific publication was on Anareaster, a new genus of asteroid from Antarctica. This early work formed the basis of a modern interactive guide to the starfish of the Ross Sea.

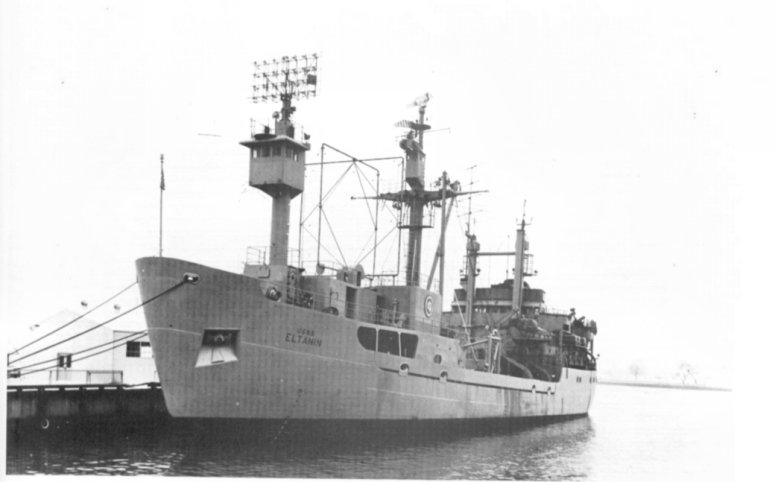
USNS Eltanin (T-AGOR-8) oceanographic research vessel. Clark participated in one of its research voyages.

== Research voyage ==
She sailed as a scientist for a research voyage on the research vessel USNS Eltanin. This US research vessel conducted a total of 52 Antarctic research cruises from July 5, 1962, thru December 29, 1972. Over this time, some 80% of the southern ocean was surveyed, and a total of 400,000 miles traveled. She wrote of her time aboard "a southern trip in the research vessel Eltanin was most rewarding and enjoyable. It was very exciting to see fresh and almost living material rising from the ocean depths!" Clark was only one of two women aboard for the voyage. She wrote for Antarctic magazine saying "When we were on station my trawl invariably came at the end and this necessitated long hours of weary waiting. Then would come the slow steady creep of the wire over the edge, the long wait, the clatter of the winch as it began to wind the thousand or more fathoms of wire in again and the sudden awful taughtening of the wire if the trawl became stuck on the bottom. Then would come the manoeuvring of the ship, swearing, shouting, excitement and then it would be free and beginning its slow ascent again from the depths."

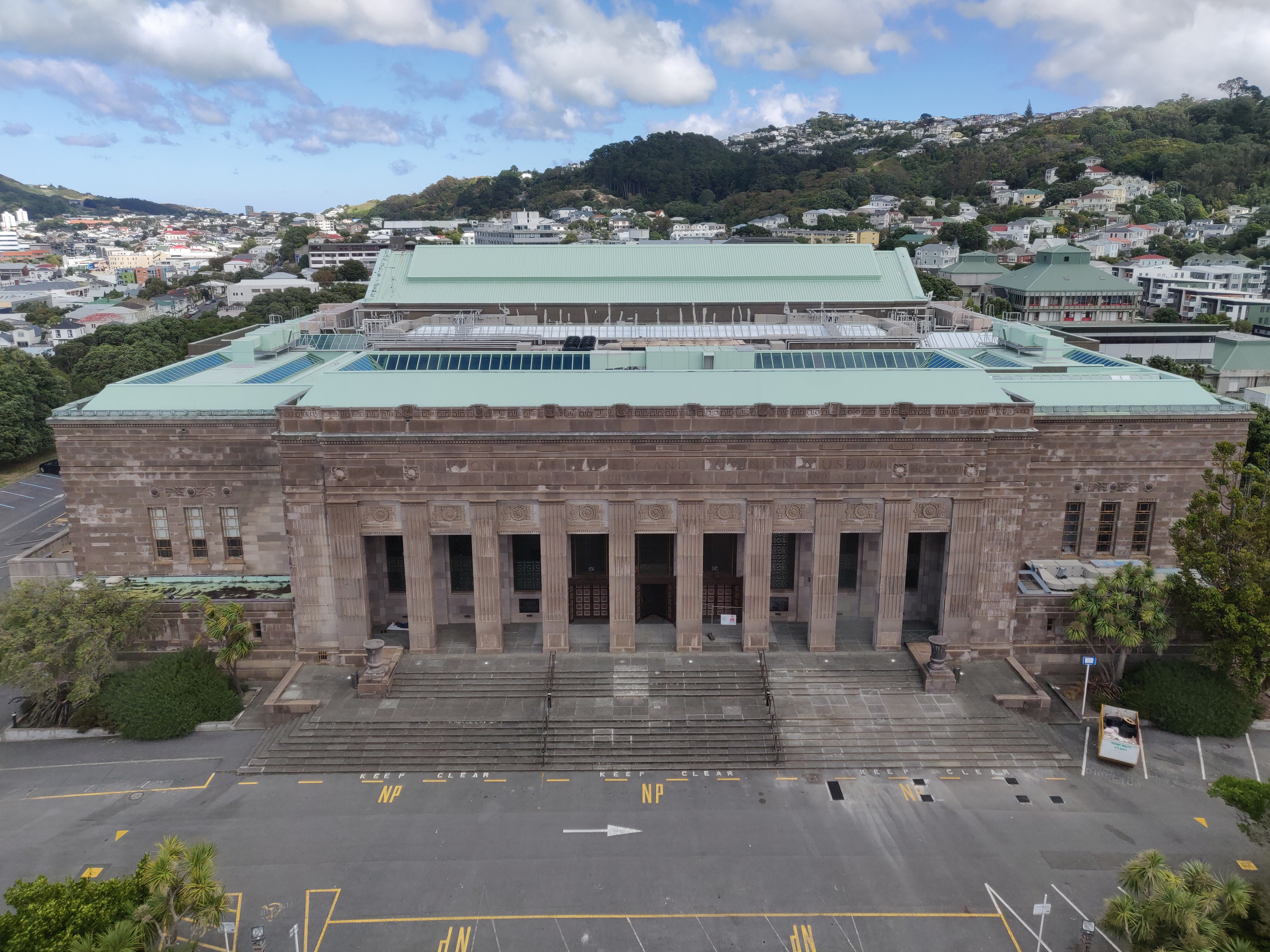
National Museum of New Zealand at its original location in Buckle St. Clark worked there as a Research Associate.

== International work ==
She worked at a number of research and teaching institutes. In 1961 she started lecturing at the University of Malta in the original Valletta campus. After that she moved to Kwame Nkrumah University of Science and Technology in Kumasi, Ghana in the years 1964–1966 to teach zoology. This period included the violent ousting of President Kwame Nkrumah and associated social unrest. Of the violence and unrest Clark said "I don't think that at any time the Europeans were in any danger but it was quite frightening and I think it could have got out of hand very easily". She worked for a time at the Smithsonian National Museum of Natural History in Washington, D.C., with David Pawson, a fellow New Zealander.

== Later career ==
Following this period, she took up a position as a research associate at the National Museum of New Zealand at its original location. Her time at the museum included a major study published in Nature suggesting a new class of echinoderms, Xyloplax medmiformis which represents a radical departure in morphology from any other known extant echinoderm based on samples of sunken timber from off New Zealand's coast.

In 1993, she joined NIWA where her collaborators included Drs. Don McKnight and Geoff Read. Her first NIWA paper, co-authored by McKnight, was about a taxonomically challenging new genus of deep-water sea-star. They named it Damnaster tasmani, reflecting the challenge posed by this complex organism. They were able to justify the name in formal classical terms—aster means star, and damn, comes from the Latin verb damnare, to adjudge, affirm or sentence. The work with Read included a study of how sea-stars ingested worms.

The World Register of Marine Species (WoRMS) indicates that she named 50 species.

Throughout her life she was well known for collecting and caring for animals. When she left Ghana, Helen contacted Gerald Durrell at Jersey Zoo and offered her collection to them. They decided they needed an eagle owl and asked her to accompany two orphan leopard cubs for them as well.

== Honours ==
Circeaster helenae is a starfish named in her honour based on a holotype found 145 nautical miles NW off Port Hedland, Western Australia. The specimen is now stored in the Western Australian Museum Marine Invertebrate Collection.

In 2021, a seamount in the Ross Sea was named in her honour. The feature is named Helen ES Clark Seamount and is located in the Southern Ocean at -72.8 latitude, -160.3 longitude.
