= Harold Covington =

American neo-Nazi (1953–2018)

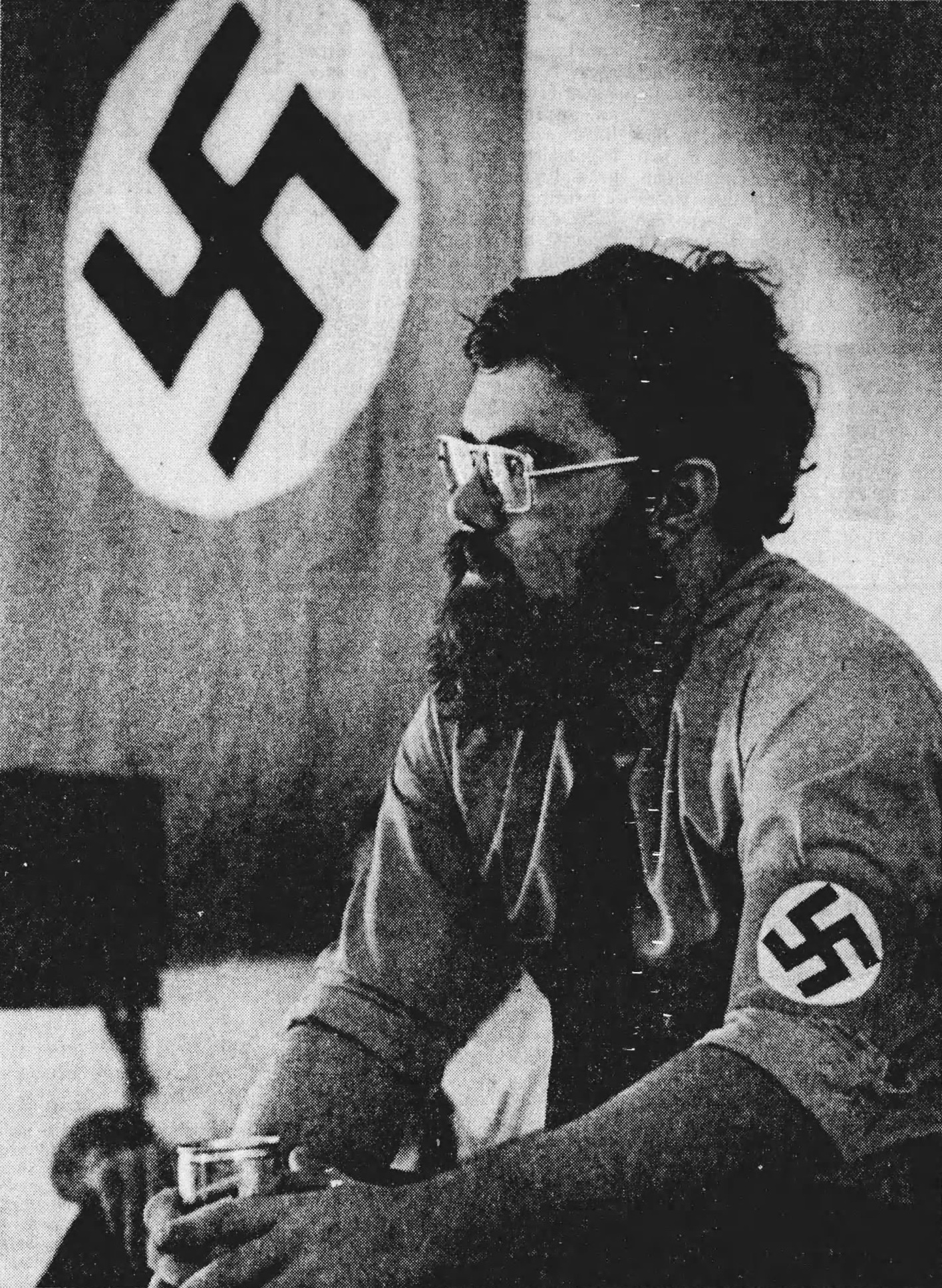
- Covington in 1977

2nd President of the National Socialist Party of America
- In office 1977–1981
- Preceded by: Frank Collin
- Succeeded by: Organization disbanded

Personal details
- Born: Harold Armstead Covington; September 14, 1953 Burlington, North Carolina, U.S.
- Died: July 14, 2018 (aged 64) Bremerton, Washington, U.S.
- Occupation: Author

Harold Armstead Covington (September 14, 1953 – July 14, 2018) was an American neo-Nazi activist and writer. He was a controversial figure even within the neo-Nazi movement; academic Jeffrey Kaplan described him as having "always raised more ire than virtually anyone in the fissiparous world of American National Socialism".

After high school he joined the United States Army and joined the neo-Nazi group the National Socialist White People's Party (NSWPP). After being discharged from the army, Covington moved to South Africa, then Rhodesia, before being deported from Rhodesia for harassing members of a Jewish congregation. Upon his return to America, he joined the National Socialist Party of America (NSPA), becoming its leader. Following the Greensboro massacre that involved the NSPA, Covington was accused by both the Nazis and the Communists involved of being involved and possibly having informed on the far-right to escape consequences, which he denied. He ran for a number of local political positions in the 1970s, but did not achieve electoral success. In 1980, he ran for attorney general of North Carolina, receiving 56,000 votes in the Republican primary, over 43% of the vote.

In his later years, he advocated the creation of a white ethnostate in the Pacific Northwest and was the founder of the Northwest Front (NF), a white separatist political movement that sought to establish a new nation to that effect. He wrote and self-published several fiction novels to mixed reception within the white nationalist movement.

== Early life ==
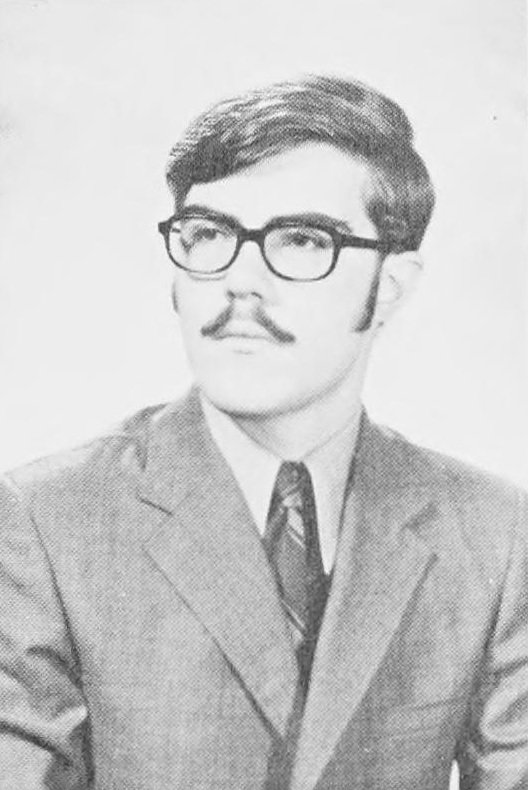
Covington's 1971 yearbook photo

Harold Armstead Covington was born on September 14, 1953, in Burlington, North Carolina, the eldest of three brothers. His father, Forrest Covington, was a folk singer and employee of Western Electric. Both of his parents were traditional conservatives.

He was the grandson of A. B. Glass, the founder of the Greensboro Dixie Bedding Company; from this company Covington received a large inheritance. His younger brother Ben Covington later disavowed him and his views, and said several of his claims about his life were made up. According to Ben Covington, Covington's beliefs devastated their parents. In 1980, Covington said his father had not spoken to him in 8 years.

He attended Chapel Hill High School. His racist views were largely born out of his experiences with racial integration in school in the 1960s, which he described in negative terms. He was described by teachers as a gifted student; he won a place at the annual Governor's School for Gifted Boys program in Winston-Salem, one of 400 students annually selected in the state. There, he studied drama. He briefly wrote for his high school's newspaper in an activities column, but was kicked off shortly after for using it to express his complaints, particularly about the school's black students.

== Political activities ==
Covington was a contentious figure on the far-right, and would often take the blame for many negative events that befell the movement. Academic Jeffrey Kaplan described him as having "always raised more ire than virtually anyone in the fissiparous world of American National Socialism", while Stephen E. Atkins noted that "despite his long career as a neo-Nazi, Covington is not a popular figure in the movement", attributing this to his conflicts with other well known white supremacists. Similarly, the Southern Poverty Law Center said that Covington had launched "endless attacks on most of the leaders of the extreme right, to the point where he is today almost totally isolated from the organizations that make up the white supremacist movement". Other neo-Nazis nicknamed him "Weird Harold". Separately he was accused by other neo-Nazis of secretly being Jewish, or gay.

=== NSWPP, South Africa, and Rhodesia ===
In 1971, he graduated from high school and joined the United States Army. He joined the Franklin Road chapter of the National Socialist White People's Party (NSWPP) the next year. While stationed at Schofield Barracks in Hawaii, he passed out neo-Nazi propaganda. He was posted to its Californian branch in El Monte, California, where he was led by local leader Joseph Tommasi. Initially, the NSWPP's leader, Matt Koehl, seeing Covington as a quality propagandist, moved him to the party's headquarters in Arlington, Virginia, to edit their White Power periodical. Covington grew to despise Koehl and became one of his foremost in-movement enemies. Numerous other neo-Nazis also hated Koehl; what set Covington apart from the rest was the sheer extent of his loathing, which would persist for the rest of his life, and extended to accusing him over the decades of homosexuality, financial impropriety, and being involved in the murder of the NSWPP's original founder, George Lincoln Rockwell.

He was honorably discharged from the army two years after joining due to his racist activities; the army psychiatrist deemed him as having paranoid personality disorder. After his discharge from the U.S. Army, he moved to Johannesburg in South Africa in December 1973, where he worked as a payroll clerk, before moving later to Bulawayo, Rhodesia (now Zimbabwe). Covington was a founding member of the Rhodesian White People's Party and later claimed to have served in the Rhodesian Army as a mercenary. According to his son and official records he only worked as a filing clerk for a brief time, and according to the Rhodesian government had never served in their army. He was deported from Rhodesia in early 1976 due to his racism. This came after Covington sent hostile letters to the Bulawayo Hebrew Congregation that caused them to fear for their safety. After leaving the NSWPP, he affiliated with George Dietz, and then returned to his home state of North Carolina.

=== National Socialist Party of America ===
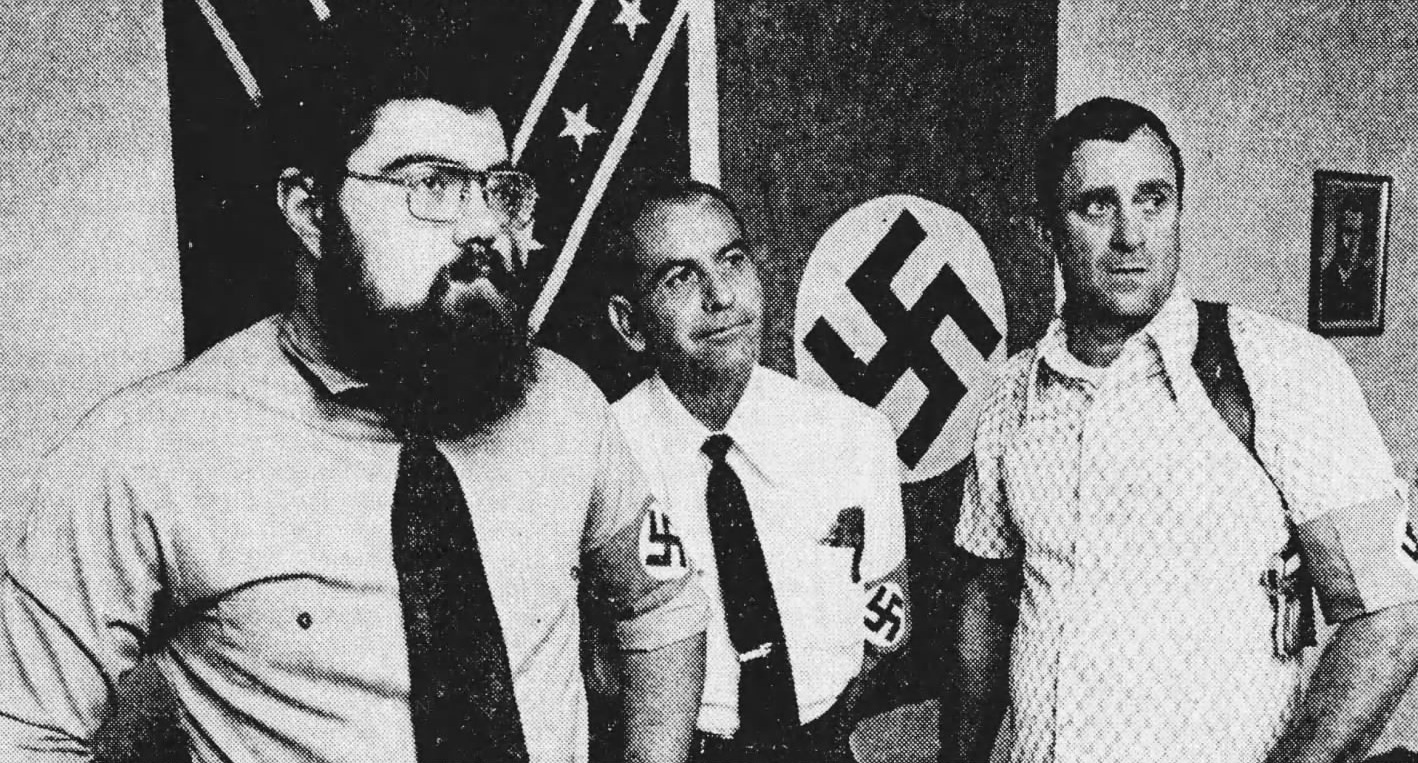
Covington (left) alongside fellow NSPA members Frank Braswell and Art Randall in 1977

Covington moved to Raleigh, North Carolina and joined the National Socialist Party of America, then rising in popularity among the neo-Nazi movement. The party was led by Frank Collin, and Covington rose quickly in the organization's ranks, to its leadership. Covington tried to build the party up in North Carolina. Jeffrey Kaplan described his involvement in the NSPA as "one of the greatest disasters of Covington’s long career—and that is saying much, given Covington’s unfortunate organizational history." The North Carolinan branch of the NSPA was known for its unusual array of members, who Covington tried to organize, to no avail. While involved in the NSPA in the late 1970s, Covington ran for a variety of local political positions in Raleigh, including the city council and the role of mayor. He also ran for state senate; all of his electoral efforts were unsuccessful. At this time he had no job and simply took what money he needed from party finances, though he claimed he also made money writing fiction under a pseudonym.

He was involved in the Greensboro massacre of 1979, which killed five members of the Communist Workers' Party. While it was a conflict between the CWP and the Ku Klux Klan, two of the sixteen accused were also NSPA members. Despite being a key organizer of the demonstration that led to the massacre and a leader of the NSPA, Covington was not actually present at the event. Additionally, the violence was likely kicked off by a federal informant who Covington was accused of having brought to the group. There is a widespread belief among the neo-Nazi movement that Covington escaped consequences for his involvement in Greensboro by informing on them. The Federal Bureau of Investigation later attempted to track him down so he could disprove allegations made by the Nazis and the Communists involved in the massacre that he was a CIA or FBI operative. The FBI failed to find him, having lost his trail after tracking him to South Africa. Covington denied that he was an informant.

In 1980, while a leader of the National Socialist Party of America, he ran for a primary election for the Republican nomination for candidates for attorney general of North Carolina. He was disavowed by the Republican state leadership and only ran a marginal campaign, though attracted a decent amount of media attention; his campaign promise was "less law and more justice". Despite losing the primary, he won 56,000 votes with 43% of the total. This was a far better performance than both Covington and Republican state leaders had expected, and Covington received national media attention as a result. Speaking with the Associated Press, Covington said that the Republican party was full of "closet Nazis" and that "there are 56,000 people in this state who are either Nazis or fools". That year, he sponsored a neo-Nazi gathering called Hitlerfest.

Afterwards, members of the North Carolinan NSPA branch, in what was probably an effort to distract from Greensboro, plotted to bomb a shopping center. This was probably planned without Covington knowing, and he was horrified upon learning, fearing white people would be harmed. The plot was thwarted due to the high rate of infiltration by informants, which only furthered the rumor that Covington himself was an informant. At the same time, it was revealed that Frank Collin was half-Jewish; several neo-Nazis, including Covington, then searched Collin's home, whereupon they found a collection of homosexual child pornography. Covington and several other neo-Nazis engineered a coup and turned Collin over to the police, and he was sentenced to several years in prison. Unlike other neo-Nazis, Covington refused to accept that Collin was partially of Jewish descent. Covington became leader of the NSPA in 1980, but became embroiled in a leadership dispute and was forced to resign in April 1981, replaced as leader by Michael Allen. That same year, Covington alleged that would-be presidential assassin John Hinckley Jr. had formerly been a member of the NSPA. Law enforcement authorities were never able to corroborate this claim and suggested the alleged connection "may have been fabricated for publicity purposes".

=== International activity ===
Faced with criticism, in 1982 he fled the country. He traveled throughout several countries for the next five years, living for a time in Ireland, the United Kingdom, and South Africa. He married an Irish woman and got dual citizenship there, before returning to the United States in 1987. That year, his book, The March Up Country, was published by the neo-Nazi book publisher Liberty Bell Publications. In 1988, he established in Raleigh the Confederate National Congress (CNC), a white supremacist group pledging allegiance to the confederacy, which later affiliated with the KKK.

In the late 1980s, Covington was a neighbor and friend of North Carolinian white supremacist and Church of the Creator member William White Williams; they collaborated in an effort to broadcast Tom Metzger's white supremacist public-access show Race and Reason. However, Covington had a lengthy feud with the COTC and its leader Ben Klassen, which extended into a feud with Williams; Covington accused Williams of only being out for Klassen's money. The COTC's paper Racial Loyalty issued harsh criticisms of Covington, (alleging that he was "a government agent, a closet rabbi, an agent provocateur of the Greensboro Massacre, an ADL informant, and a Mossad agent") and Covington sued the COTC, Klassen, and Williams for libel, though Covington later dropped the case. Williams and Klassen then got Covington fired from his job. Covington claimed that Williams disguised himself as an FBI agent and contacted his employer, saying the Jewish Defense League had a plot to assassinate Covington. According to the local newspaper The News & Observer, Covington afterwards became Williams's "longtime rival".

In the early 1990s, Covington returned to the United Kingdom, operating there with little media attention, until his presence there was exposed by the antifascist magazine Searchlight in June; Searchlight published several of his letters. He initially claimed that he was there to work and study rather than engage in political activism, though later spoke of his mission to garner support for neo-Nazi activities. During this period he became affiliated with the neo-Nazi network Combat 18. Searchlight also claimed that Covington had connections with the Irish Republican Army.

Covington returned to North Carolina in 1994, where he started an organization called the National Socialist White People's Party, using the same name of the successor to the American Nazi Party, in Chapel Hill, North Carolina. They published a neo-Nazi newsletter called Resistance. He conflicted with Tom Metzger, the leader of the White Aryan Resistance, in the mid-1990s, accusing him of selling out to the Southern Poverty Law Center(SPLC). Covington's NSWPP ceased in 1999.

=== Internet propagandizing and the Northwest Territorial Imperative ===
A proposed flag of the Northwest Territorial Imperative used by white separatists such as Covington's Northwest Front

Covington launched a website in 1996; using the pseudonym Winston Smith (taken from the novel Nineteen Eighty-Four; a recurrent alias used by Covington), Covington became one of the first neo-Nazi presences on the Internet. Covington used his online presence to disseminate Holocaust-denial material; however, he stated that if he was convinced that the Holocaust had happened, it would "cheer" him. Online, Covington and his followers had what was described as a "vituperative online feud" with neo-Nazi leader William Luther Pierce and his followers over "the future of the white internet". Covington complained that "the Net is being viciously and tragically abused by a shockingly large number of either bogus or deranged 'white Racists'". Covington maintained a political blog titled "Thoughtcrime".

In 1997, continuing their previous feud, Will Williams sued Covington for libel in Wake County, North Carolina, based on defamatory statements Covington had made about him online and in his newsletter. Among the statements at issue were Covington's accusations of Williams being a thief, of recruiting a future murderer into the white supremacist movement, and of being the second John Doe in the 1995 Oklahoma City bombing. Williams said to a local news reporter that Covington was an "unabashed, pathological liar" and that this time he had gone too far. Covington admitted to making the statements but called the lawsuit a "waste of time", considering Williams to be "libel-proof" due to his involvement in white supremacy. Williams won the suit and Covington was ordered to pay him $10,000; in what several commentators described as an effort to avoid paying Williams, Covington then moved to Olympia, Washington.

In Washington, Covington advocated the creation of a "white homeland" in the Pacific Northwest (known as the Northwest Territorial Imperative). Following the 2000 victory of the SPLC in their lawsuit against white separatist leader Richard Girnt Butler of the Aryan Nations, where Butler lost his white separatist commune and the Aryan Nations effectively ceased operations, Covington became convinced of the necessity of white separatism beyond the current legal system. He considered the Butler case evidence that they needed a separate nation rather than separatist communities. Covington committed to writing what he described as "a kind of Northwest Turner Diaries", the Northwest novel series where he espouses his political ideology. He started an organization called the Northwest Front, a movement devoted to creating a white ethnostate, the Northwest American Republic (NAR), in the Pacific Northwest. In the 2000s, Covington and other white separatists drafted and wrote an NAR constitution.

Covington was mentioned in the media in connection with the Charleston church shooting, whose perpetrator Dylann Roof discussed the Northwest Front in his manifesto, and was critical of its means and objectives. According to Covington, the shooting was "a preview of coming attractions", but he also believed it was a bad idea for his followers to engage in random acts of violence, instead supporting organized revolution.

== Writing career ==
In addition to his leadership of various neo-Nazi organizations, Covington was also a prolific writer in the form of both blogs and books, publishing 11 novels in total. His most influential book is his non-fiction political work, The March Up Country. Academic Jeffrey Kaplan noted his writing ability, saying he was perhaps the most skilled propagandist ever produced by American neo-Nazism; he further said that "even the writings of the Commander himself, George Lincoln Rockwell, were but candles in the wind before the blast of Covington’s purple prose." Kaplan noted his body of work as "voluminous", with an "unusual capacity for self-analysis" for a neo-Nazi. Stephen E. Atkins attributed his motive for fiction writing to his lack of popularity within the white supremacist movement, which hindered his organizational abilities.

He finished his book, Rose of Honor, in 1980. He claimed to The News and Observer at this time that he made money writing ghost stories under a pseudonym that he refused to reveal. His books were self-published in later decades through print on demand services, outsourcing the production and distribution to an unrelated company. Covington promoted this approach and said it helped him avoid the publication pitfalls and censorship that befell other far-right extremist literature like The Turner Diaries.

As Covington had a personal interest in the occult and black magic, such topics were reflected in his works; he wrote in genres focusing on the occult, medievalist, gothic, crime, and historical fiction; Covington claimed that there was "a political and racial message somewhere" in all of his books. He is best known for his series of four Northwest Independence novels that began in 2003, the Northwest series: A Distant Thunder, A Mighty Fortress, The Hill of the Ravens, The Brigade. The series focuses on a white separatist insurgency that overthrows a defective American government in the Pacific Northwest. Within this series Covington had a self-insert character as the "Old Man" who advises the main characters.

Kevin Hicks writing for Southern Poverty Law Center criticized his occult novels as "cheesy" and "confused", saying that Covington's failure to translate his "dubious talent" for propaganda writing into fiction writing was "a small gift for which the human race can feel truly grateful". Kaplan said he had "a rare talent with a pen" and that "no one on the receiving end of Covington’s bombastic wit emerged unscathed, and none would ever forgive the Nazi Bard". He attributed the "widespread anti-Covington animus" within the neo-Nazi movement to his writings. He further described the Northwest series as "in many ways the best of the American post-apocalyptic literature of the radical right". The reaction to the Northwest series within the White nationalist movement itself was mixed. One writer for the white supremacist website Vanguard News Network praised it as a better work than The Turner Diaries and "the most authoritative treatment of White separatism in the English language". Other white nationalists criticized the strategy promoted in the book as too minimalist in its aims, failing to take over the whole nation.

== Death and legacy ==
Covington died in Bremerton, Washington, on July 14, 2018. His ideas influenced some far right groups, including the Atomwaffen Division and The Base.

== Publications ==
=== Nonfiction ===
- The March Up Country (1987)
- Dreaming the Iron Dream (2005)
- The Northwest Front Handbook (2014)

=== Fiction ===
- Vindictus: A Novel of History’s First Gunfighter (2000)
- Fire and Rain (2000)
- Slow Coming Dark: A Novel of the Age of Clinton (2000)
- The Stars in Their Path: A Novel of Reincarnation (2001)
- The Black Flame (2001)
- Revelation 9 (2001)
- Rose of Honor (2001)
- The Renegade (2001)
- Bonnie Blue Murder: A Civil War Mystery (2001)
- Other Voices, Darker Rooms: Eight Grim Tales (2001)

==== Northwest series ====
- The Hill of the Ravens (2003)
- A Distant Thunder (2004)
- A Mighty Fortress (2005)
- The Brigade (2007)
- Freedom's Sons (2013)
