= Frank Collin =

American white supremacist (born 1944)

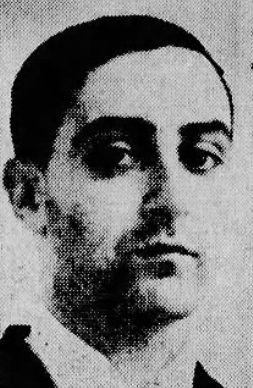
- Collin in 1970

1st President of the National Socialist Party of America
- In office 1970–1977
- Preceded by: Position established
- Succeeded by: Harold Covington

Personal details
- Born: November 3, 1944 (age 81) Chicago, Illinois, U.S.
- Party: National Socialist Party of America (1970–1977)
- Other political affiliations: American Nazi Party (c. 1960s)
- Profession: Political activist, New Age author

Francis Joseph Collin (born November 3, 1944) is an American former political activist and Midwest coordinator with the American Nazi Party, later known as the National Socialist White People's Party. After being ousted for being partly Jewish (which he denied), in 1970, Collin founded the National Socialist Party of America (NSPA). In the late 1970s, his planned march in the predominantly Jewish suburb of Skokie, Illinois was challenged; the case ultimately reached the United States Supreme Court to correct procedural deficiencies.

In 1979 Collin was convicted of child molestation and sentenced to seven years in prison, and he lost his position in the party. After being released early on parole from prison, Collin created a new career as a writer, publishing numerous books under the pen name Frank Joseph. He wrote New Age and hyperdiffusionist works.

== Early life ==
Collin was born and raised in Chicago, Illinois, where he attended local schools. His father, Max Frank Collin, was born Max Simon Cohn in Munich, Germany, on August 23, 1913, the son of Jewish parents who were murdered in the Holocaust, and was a survivor of Dachau concentration camp. Frank's mother, Virginia Gertrude née Hardyman, was born in Chicago on August 18, 1920, and was Catholic.

== Political activity ==
In the 1960s, when he was a young man, Collin joined George Lincoln Rockwell's National Socialist White People's Party (formerly the American Nazi Party). He became the Midwest coordinator. He broke with the NSWPP due to a disagreement with Rockwell's successor, Matt Koehl, who was elected as the party leader by popular vote after Rockwell was assassinated on August 25, 1967. The falling out stemmed in part from published accounts by Max Collin, Frank's father, who said that he was a Jewish Holocaust survivor and had changed his name from Cohen (or Cohn) to Collin. Frank Collin denied having Jewish roots and maintained that his father was not telling the truth.

In 1970, Collin formed another organization, the National Socialist Party of America (NSPA). It attracted other disaffected members of the NSWPP, as well as Michael Allen, Gary Lauck and Harold Covington. Covington helped buy a building for the group which they called Rockwell Hall, where Collin and some other members lived in a barracks in upper floor. Collin ran for alderman of Chicago in 1975 and pulled 16% of the vote.

The NSPA began its activities by holding anti-black demonstrations in Chicago's Marquette Park. The Chicago authorities became concerned about violence and passed an ordinance which required demonstrations to post large insurance bonds. Collin went to the ACLU and they filed a suit. While the case was proceeding without public notice, Collin attempted to contact other cities about holding demonstrations. In the late 1970s, his planned march in the predominantly Jewish suburb of Skokie, Illinois was challenged; however, the American Civil Liberties Union defended Collin's group's freedom of speech and assembly in a case that reached the United States Supreme Court to correct procedural deficiencies.

Specifically, the necessity for an immediate appellate review of the orders which restrained the exercise of First Amendment rights was strongly emphasized in National Socialist Party of America v. Village of Skokie, 432 U.S. 43 (1977). Afterward, the Illinois Supreme Court ruled that the party had a right to march and display swastikas, despite local opposition, based on the First Amendment to the United States Constitution. Collin then offered a compromise, offering to march in Chicago's Marquette Park (where Martin Luther King had been attacked in 1966) instead of Skokie. Collin's plan for his neo-Nazi group to march in uniforms through Skokie, which was heavily Jewish with numerous residents who were Holocaust survivors, generated public outrage and the media attention which Collin sought.

Also in 1977, Koehl's NSWPP published proof that Collin's father was Jewish in its paper White Power, and it offered $10,000 to anyone who could disprove this piece of information. The leaders of the NSWPP did not consider this piece of information credible until they managed to find and published what they stated were Max Simon Cohn's naturalization records. Collin and the leaders of the NSPA continued to deny the claim by stating that the images were fakes.

Under unclear circumstances in the aftermath of the case, Covington then found pictures in Frank Collin's desk that linked Collin to the sexual abuse of young boys. In what Kaplan described as a play for power in the organization, Covington and the other NSPA members turned the evidence on Collin over to the police. After Collin was arrested, Covington took over leadership of the NSPA and moved the headquarters from Chicago to North Carolina. A 1980 article in The New York Times reported that Frank Collin was expelled from the party for illicit intercourse with minors and the use of Nazi headquarters in Chicago for purposes of sodomy with children. The report indicates that the Nazis "tipped" the police who arrested Collin. Collin was convicted of child molestation and sentenced to seven years in prison at the Pontiac Correctional Center in 1979. He served three years.

== Author ==
Upon his release from prison, Collin "reinvented himself under the pseudonym of Frank Joseph, a New Age writer and a pagan worshiper". His time in the Pontiac Correctional Facility in Illinois had coincided with the period when Russell E. Burrows worked there as a prison guard. He subsequently wrote many books and articles in support of Burrows Cave, an alleged cache of ancient treasure in an unrevealed location, supposedly discovered by Russell Burrows in southern Illinois. In 1987, he had his first New Age book published, The Destruction of Atlantis: Compelling Evidence of the Sudden Fall of the Legendary Civilization.

He wrote articles for Fate magazine, and he was also the editor of The Ancient American magazine. The Ancient American focuses on what it says is evidence of ancient, pre-Columbian transoceanic contact between the Old World and North America, with the implication that all complex aspects of North America's indigenous cultures must have originated on other continents. The magazine's claims are similar to discredited nineteenth century theories, and as a result, they are considered dubious or exploitative by scholars.

=== Books (as Frank Joseph) ===
- The Destruction of Atlantis: Compelling Evidence of the Sudden Fall of the Legendary Civilization (Atlantis Research Publishers, 1987) OCLC 17424780

- Reprinted 2004, Bear and Co., ISBN 1-59143-019-4

- Atlantis in Wisconsin: New Revelations About the Lost Sunken City (Galde Press, 1995) ISBN 1-880090-12-0
- Edgar Cayce's Atlantis and Lemuria: The Lost Civilizations in the Light of Modern Discoveries (A.R.E. Press, 2001) ISBN 0-87604-434-8
- Lost Pyramids of Rock Lake: Wisconsin's Sunken Civilization (Galde Press, 2002) ISBN 1-931942-01-3
- The Lost Treasure of King Juba: The Evidence of Africans in America before Columbus (Bear and Co., 2003) ISBN 1-59143-006-2
- Synchronicity & You: Understanding the Role of Meaningful Coincidence in Your Life, 2003, ISBN 1-84333-102-0
- Last of the Red Devils: America's First Bomber Pilot (Galde Press, 2003) ISBN 1-880090-09-0
- Survivors of Atlantis: Their Impact on World Culture (Galde Press, 2004) ISBN 1-59143-040-2
- The Atlantis Encyclopedia (New Page Books, 2005) ISBN 1-56414-795-9
- The Lost Civilization of Lemuria: The Rise and Fall of the Worlds Oldest Culture (Bear and Co., 2006) ISBN 1-59143-060-7
- Opening the Ark of the Covenant: The Secret Power of the Ancients, The Knights Templar Connection, and the Search for the Holy Grail (New Page Books, 2007) ISBN 1-56414-903-X
- Atlantis and Other Lost Worlds (Arcturus, 2008) ISBN 1-84837-085-7
- Advanced Civilizations of Prehistoric America: The Lost Kingdoms of the Adena, Hopewell, Mississippians, and Anasazi (Bear and Co., 2009) ISBN 1-59143-107-7
- Power of Coincidence: The Mysterious Role of Synchronicity in Shaping Our Lives (Arcturus, 2009) ISBN 1-84837-224-8
- Mussolini's War: Fascist Italy's Military Struggles from Africa and Western Europe to the Mediterranean and Soviet Union 1935–45 (Helion & Company Ltd., 2009) ISBN 978-1906033569
- Gods of the Runes: The Divine Shapers of Fate (Bear and Co., 2010) ISBN 1-59143-116-6
- Atlantis and 2012: The Science of the Lost Civilization and the Prophecies of the Maya (Bear and Co., 2010) ISBN 978-1-59143-112-1
- The Axis Air Forces: Flying in Support of the German Luftwaffe (Praeger, 2011) ISBN 978-0313395901
- Ancient High Tech: The Astonishing Scientific Achievements of Early Civilizations (Bear and Co., 2020) ISBN 978-1591433828
- Military Encounters with Extraterrestrials: The Real War of the Worlds (Bear and Co., 2018) ISBN 978-1591433248

== See also ==
- Dan Burros
