= America B.C.: Ancient Settlers in the New World =

1976 book by Barry Fell

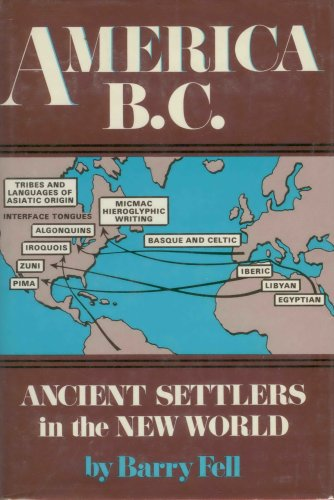
- Cover of the first edition
- Author: Barry Fell
- Language: English
- Publisher: Quadrangle Books
- Publication date: 1976
- Media type: Print
- Pages: 312
- ISBN: 0-8129-0624-1
- OCLC: 2317512
- Dewey Decimal: 970.01
- LC Class: E103 .F33 1976

America B.C.: Ancient Settlers in the New World is a 1976 book written by Barry Fell that purports to establish that North America was visited by many different European Bronze Age cultures long before either Leif Ericsson or Christopher Columbus.

== Publication history and description ==
America B.C.: Ancient Settlers in the New World was first published in 1976 by Quadrangle Books. In the book, Barry Fell makes the argument that both archaeological discoveries in North America and examination of North American native languages such as Miꞌkmaq reveal possible links to Bronze Age European cultures, which would point to trans-Atlantic voyages by these cultures millennia before the "discovery" of North American by either 10th-century Vikings or 15th-century Spaniards.

== Reception ==
Most of the scientific world rejected Fell's work as pseudoscience. In 1978, Ives Goddard and William W. Fitzhugh of the Department of Anthropology at the Smithsonian Institution stated that "the arguments of America B. C. are unconvincing. The only accepted case of pre-Columbian European contact in North America remains the Norse site of L'Anse aux Meadows in northern Newfoundland. Perhaps some day credible proof of other early European contacts will be discovered in the New World. However, America B.C. does not contain such proof and does not employ the standard linguistic and archeological methods that would be necessary to convince specialists in these fields." Warwick Bray for History said that "Fell's arguments can be refuted only by considering each item individually, but it should be remembered that a general principle is not established merely by amassing unproved examples."

Warren L. Cook reviewed the book in Terrae Incognitae and found the relics "tangible, numerous, and persuasive testimonials to such historic accomplishments", calling Fell "meticulous at providing illustrations and data necessary to evaluate the authenticity of such objects and the competence of his translations." John L. Sorenson for BYU Studies said that "Fell will no doubt be smitten vigorously by hostile critics. He and his handful of collaborators are in a vulnerable position professionally. Their limited resources could be augmented significantly by sales of this book. Mormons who wish to assist one who shares some of their position in the face of opposition from the professional establishment could strike a blow by buying this book. They may enjoy it, too."

Charles R. Pettis III reviewed the book for The Ithaca Journal and said that the book is "written clearly, although the epigraphic details may be somewhat dry for some readers. The illustrations and photos leave much to be desired and are not of the standard that this exciting and fascinating book deserves." Pettis found that the book is "significant and is recommended for those with an interest in what is, for the moment, America's prehistory." John R. Wiggins for The Ellsworth American said that "This reviewer is predisposed to credit any new idea that has been trounced upon automatically by doctrinaire types who aren't inventive enough to do more than stumble over any original theory that comes their way. The rest of you can sit back and scoff at leisure, and no offense will be taken." John Rutherford for the Indianapolis News said that "Fell castigates American archeologists for their lack of interest in possible prehistoric artifacts that would presume a migration to America from any direction other than from the Bering Strait passage from Asia. He blames this on the strong influence of the Roman Empire on subsequent Western thought. ... Fell's sweeping conclusions are painted with a broad brush. They add up to a fascinating picture of what might have been."

The reviewer for The Christian Century notes that "If Fell is correct, then all the other anthropologists and archaeologists are wrong about American beginnings, since he makes much of European intrusions long before Leif Eriksson. His theories, accompanied by photographs, are engaging and even startling. His is a high-risk game, because the rest of the profession does not take kindly to extrapolations like these. Detective work, fun and games." Glyn Daniel for The New York Times reviewed both America B.C. by Barry Fell and They Came Before Columbus by Ivan Van Sertima, and said that "Fell and Van Sertima are deluded scholars; their readers must exercise care and caution before sharing unreservedly their delusions. If one is trying to build a new ancient history of pre-Columbian America, it must be based on well-argued theories backed by indispensable facts—Professors Fell and Van Sertima give us badly argued theories based on fantasies".

Georgia Becker for The Manhattan Mercury described the book as "very generously illustrated with drawings, charts, maps and actual photographs which add wonderfully to the understanding and interest" and that it was "written in a relaxed and comfortable style, posing no problems for the lay reader. The work on these early American artifacts is far from complete, in fact scarcely begun, and Fell admits that they are, no doubt, making errors that only time will reveal and correct." Dale Van Blair described the book as "copiously illustrated with dozens of photographs, drawings, tables, and charts. Included are photographs of many of the inscriptions and structures, drawings of comparable Celtic art from the old and new worlds (decorated burial urns, for example), and detailed charts comparing Egyptian and Micmac hieroplyphs. The illustrations not only are interesting in themselves, but also serve to substantiate many of the author's findings."

Eric Korn for the New Statesman said that "There is a style — ingratiating, immodest, overloaded with autobiography — which unmistakably identifies the pseudo-scholar, even one as benign and judicious as Professor Barraclough Fell: if only crank-art or crank-politics were so easily detectable." Elsebet Sander-Jørgensen Rowlett called it "an exciting and interesting book, well worth reading for the pleasure of it" and noted that "The photographs are somewhat fuzzy and drawings of the people of past centuries are questionable because of the male nudity—the population of the cultures they depict certainly did not run around naked except on very special religious occasions or during war-games. The scientific notes, maps and index are all well chosen and up-to-date."

In the August 1979 issue of Dragon (Issue #28), Paul Karlsson Johnstone found Fell's theories to be cogent and well-reasoned, calling the book "epochal", although he admitted that it contained "debatable statements". Johnstone concluded that Fell's work opened "a portal into what seemed to be a lost world."
