= Institute for the Study of American Cultures =

Organization

The Institute for the Study of American Cultures (ISAC) was an organization devoted to the study of pre-Columbian contact between the Old and New Worlds. Although as an organization it did not espouse any particular theory, it was strongly oriented in a general way toward a hyperdiffusionist view that pre-Columbian contact had been extensive. It was greatly influenced by the work of Barry Fell.

ISAC was founded by Dr. Joseph B. Mahan a professional anthropologist whose career was primarily devoted to work in museums. Headquartered in Columbus, Georgia, ISAC's activities consisted of holding an annual conference and of publishing books advocating the hyperdiffusionist view.

ISAC continued holding annual conferences after the death of its founder and President Dr. Mahan in 1995. The 30th Anniversary Conference was celebrated in 2003. Currently, ISAC's collection is housed at the Columbus State University Archives in Columbus, Georgia. Organizations with similar perspectives whose memberships overlapped that of ISAC are the Midwest Epigraphic Society and the Epigraphic Society.

== See also ==
- Pre-Columbian trans-oceanic contact
- Pseudoarchaeology
