= National Socialist Party of America =

- Abbreviation: NSPA
- Leader: Frank Collin (1970–1977); Harold Covington (1977–1981)
- Founded: 1970; 56 years ago
- Dissolved: 1981; 45 years ago
- Split from: National Socialist White People's Party
- Headquarters: Chicago, Illinois; Raleigh, North Carolina
- Ideology: Neo-Nazism
- Political position: Far-right

The National Socialist Party of America (NSPA) was a Chicago-based organization founded in 1970 by Frank Collin shortly after he left the National Socialist White People's Party, originally the American Nazi Party. The NSPA was sometimes also called the American Nazi Party (ANP), though that was not its official name. They were involved in the Greensboro massacre and a high profile marching controversy in Skokie, Illinois. Harold Covington succeeded Collin as leader of the NSPA in 1979, before dissolving the organization in 1981.

== History ==
The National Socialist Party of America was founded in 1970 by Frank Collin shortly after he left the National Socialist White People's Party, originally the American Nazi Party. The NSPA was sometimes also called the American Nazi Party (ANP), though that was not its official name.

The party's headquarters was in Chicago's Marquette Park, and its main activity in the early 1970s was organizing loud demonstrations against black people moving into previously all-white neighborhoods. The marches and community reaction led the city of Chicago in 1977 to ban all demonstrations in Marquette Park unless they paid an insurance fee of $250,000 (equivalent to $1.33 million in 2025). While challenging the city's actions in the courts, the party decided to redirect its attention to Chicago's suburbs, which had no such restrictions.

In 1977 Collin announced the party's intention to march through the largely Jewish community of Skokie, Illinois, where one in six residents was a Holocaust survivor. A legal battle ensued when the village attempted to ban the event and the party. Represented by a Jewish ACLU lawyer in court, they won the right to march on First Amendment grounds in National Socialist Party v. Village of Skokie, a lawsuit carried all the way to the U.S. Supreme Court, though it failed to carry through its intention (at the last minute, Chicago relented and they marched there instead).

They were involved in the Greensboro massacre. Harold Covington succeeded Collin as leader of the NSPA in 1979, before dissolving the organization in 1981.

== See also ==
- Neo-Nazi groups in the Americas
- Marquette Park rallies
