= Edward P. Vining =

19th-century American writer

Edward Payson Vining (1847–1920) was an American writer and railroad executive. He was the author of An Inglorious Columbus (1885), in which he argued that Hui Shen was originally from Afghanistan, traveled to China and Mexico, and created Mexican culture and religion. He also wrote The Mystery of Hamlet. An Attempt to Solve an Old Problem (1881), in which he argued that Shakespeare's Hamlet was actually a woman. His work on Hamlet was translated into German and published in Leipzig in 1883.

When The Mystery of Hamlet was first published, Vining was working as a general freight traffic manager at the Union Pacific Railroad. His other works included a translation of The Necessity for a Classification for Freight.

Although Vining did not graduate from college, he received an honorary A.M. from Yale in 1886, and an LL.D. from William Jewell College in 1908.
