= Barry Fell =

New Zealand zoologist (1917–1994)

- Born: Howard Barraclough Fell; 6 June 1917; Lewes, Sussex, England
- Died: 21 April 1994 (aged 76); San Diego, California, United States
- Education: University of Edinburgh (Ph.D.)
- Known for: Pseudoarchaeological work in New World epigraphy; research on fossil sea urchins and other contributions to Echinoderm taxonomy
- Scientific career
- Workplaces: Victoria University of Wellington, Harvard University
- Notable students: Helen Elizabeth Shearburn Clark

Howard Barraclough Fell (June 6, 1917 – April 21, 1994), better known as Barry Fell, was a professor of invertebrate zoology at the Harvard Museum of Comparative Zoology. While his primary professional research included influential work on echinoderms, particularly starfish and sea urchins, Fell is best known for his pseudoarchaeological work in New World epigraphy, arguing that various inscriptions in the Americas are best explained by extensive pre-Columbian contact with Old World civilizations. His writings on epigraphy and archaeology are generally rejected by those mainstream scholars who have considered them.

== Biography ==
Fell was born in Lewes, Sussex, England, and was a grandson of the railway engineer and inventor John Barraclough Fell. He moved with his mother to New Zealand in the early 1920s after his father, who was a merchant seaman, died in a shipboard fire.

He returned to the British Isles for graduate work, receiving his Ph.D. at the University of Edinburgh in 1941. Fell then served with the British Army during World War II. In 1946 he returned to New Zealand, where he resumed his academic career, and lectured in zoology at Victoria University of Wellington.

Fell was recruited by Harvard University in 1964, and emigrated to the United States to join the staff of the Museum of Comparative Zoology at Harvard where he worked until retirement in 1979.

He died of heart failure in San Diego, California, aged 77, while discussing a new book with his publisher.

== Invertebrate zoology ==
A world authority on fossil sea urchins, Fell supervised a number of students including Helen E.S. Clark, and they published a number of studies on Antarctic seastars. He won the Royal Society of New Zealand's Hector Medal for Zoology in 1959, and its Hutton Medal in 1962.

Across several papers in the 1960s, Fell proposed a four-subphylum system for Echinodermata (Crinozoa, Homalozoa, Asterozoa, and Echinozoa) to replace the long-standing two-subphylum system (Pelmatozoa and Eleutherozoa). This system was adopted by the Treatise on Invertebrate Paleontology later in the decade, and modified by James Sprinkle's establishment of Blastozoa as separate from Crinozoa in 1973. This five-subphylum system based on Fell's proposal has remained in use into the 2000s.

Fell also authored or co-authored the Treatise's chapters on Echinoderm Ontogeny, General Features and Relationships of Echinozoans, Homology of Echinozoan Rays, and Echinoids.

== Epigraphy ==
Although Fell was an accomplished marine biologist at Harvard University, he is more broadly known for three books, mostly written after retirement, which claim that many centuries before Christopher Columbus reached America, Celts, Basques, Phoenicians, Egyptians, and others were visiting North America.

His interest in inscriptions began early in his career with a study of Polynesian petroglyphs published in 1940, but his most famous work came much later, starting in 1976 with his publication of America B.C., in which he proposed translations of inscriptions found on rock surfaces and artifacts in North and South America which he believed to be written in Old World scripts and languages. He followed up this work in 1980 with Saga America and in 1982 with Bronze Age America.

Fell's epigraphic work was not well received in academia. Critics of Fell's work routinely dismissed him as an amateur, pointing out his lack of formal training in ancient scripts and languages.

A scholarly response to Fell's work was prepared by Ives Goddard and William W. Fitzhugh of the Department of Anthropology at the Smithsonian Institution. They stated, in 1978, that "the arguments of America B.C. are unconvincing. The only accepted case of pre-Columbian European contact in North America remains the Norse site of L'Anse aux Meadows in northern Newfoundland. Perhaps some day credible proof of other early European contacts will be discovered in the New World. However, America B.C. does not contain such proof and does not employ the standard linguistic and archeological methods that would be necessary to convince specialists in these fields."

One example of Fell's claims is his contention in Saga America that Brendan of Clonfert may have reached North America centuries before Columbus. This is based on Fell's translation, published in the magazine Wonderful West Virginia in 1983, of two rock-cut inscriptions located at archaeological sites in Wyoming and Boone counties, West Virginia. According to Fell, these inscriptions narrate the story of Christ's nativity and are written in an old Irish script called Ogham, dating back to the 6th or 8th century AD. This led to the publication of articles in the journal The West Virginia Archeologist that were highly critical of Fell's conclusions and methodology, including a 1983 article by archaeologist and historian W. Hunter Lesser describing Fell's claims as pseudoscientific and unreliable. In 1989 lawyers Monroe Oppenheimer and Willard Wirtz wrote an article based on opinions of academic archaeologists and linguists to dispute that the inscription is written in Ogham script. They further accused Fell of deliberate fraud.

David H. Kelley said in a 1990 essay: "Fell's work [contains] major academic sins, the three worst being distortion of data, inadequate acknowledgment of predecessors, and lack of presentation of alternative views." He added that "We need to ask not only what Fell has done wrong in his epigraphy, but also where we have gone wrong as archaeologists in not recognizing such an extensive European presence in the New World."

== Archaeology survey ==
A survey of 340 teaching archaeologists in 1983, showed 95.7% had a "negative" view of Barry Fell's claims (considering them pseudo-archaeology), 2.9% had a "neutral" view, and only 1.4% (5) had a "positive" view (regarding them as factual).

== See also ==
- America's Stonehenge
- Bourne Stone
- Burrows Cave
- Institute for the Study of American Cultures
- Los Lunas Decalogue Stone
- Mi'kmaq hieroglyphic writing
- Pre-Columbian trans-oceanic contact
- Pseudoarchaeology
- Turkey Mountain inscriptions
