= Donald Trump and fascism =

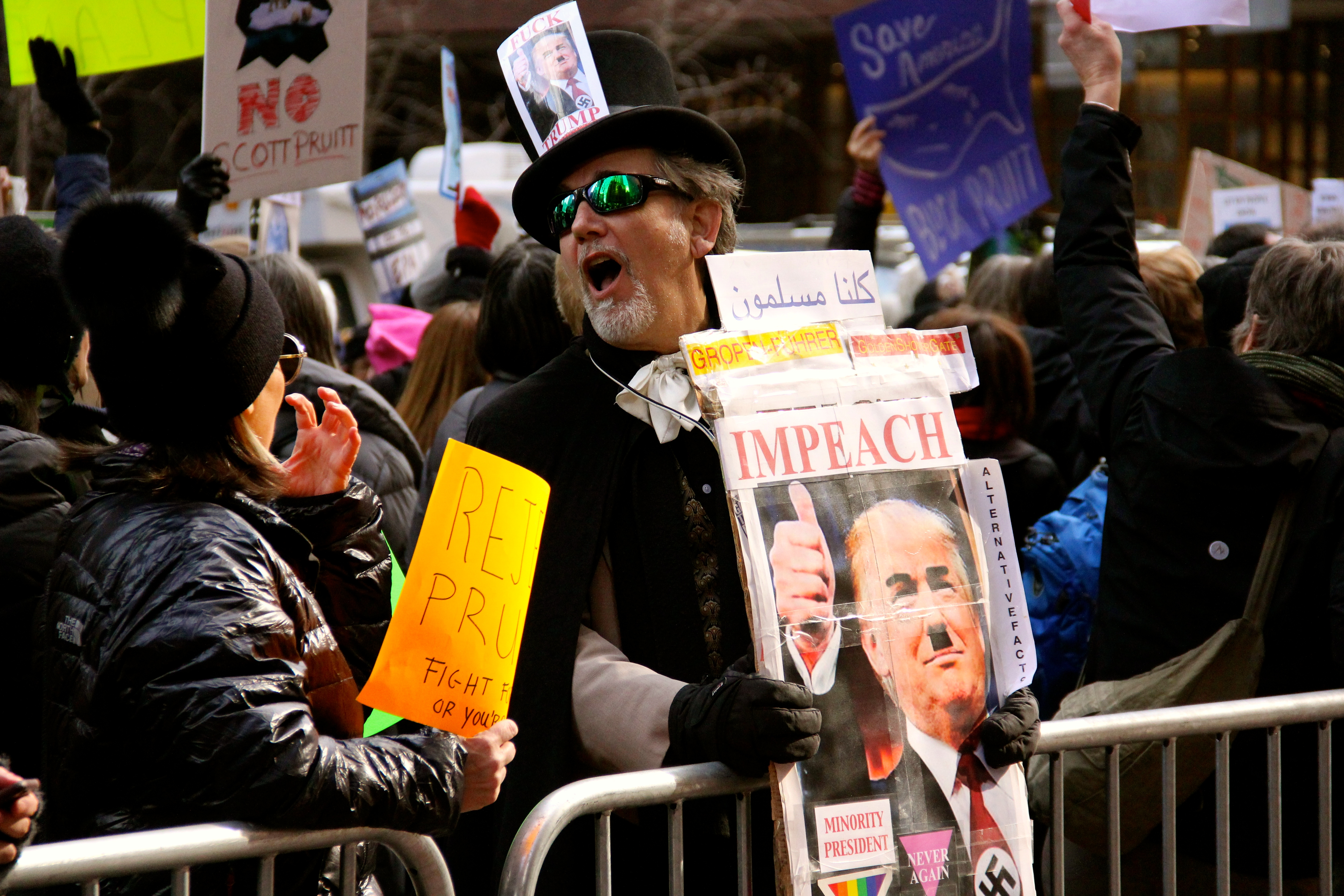
A man at a 2017 rally holding a sign likening Trump to Adolf Hitler

There has been significant academic and political debate about whether Donald Trump, the 45th and 47th president of the United States, can be considered a fascist according to consensus definitions of the term or because of expressed attitudes some critics perceive as sympathetic to the extreme right. Such critiques arose especially in response to his 2016 and 2024 presidential campaign and during his second term as president. (Note: Attributed to multiple references: Homans 2024: "No major American presidential candidate has talked like he now does at his rallies—not Richard Nixon, not George Wallace, not even Donald Trump himself."; Bender & Gold 2023a; Lehmann 2023; Basu 2023; Cassidy 2023; Lutz 2023; Browning 2023; Kim & Ibssa 2023; Ward 2024: "It's a stark escalation over the last month of what some experts in political rhetoric, fascism, and immigration say is a strong echo of authoritarians and Nazi ideology."; Applebaum 2024: "In the 2024 campaign, that line has been crossed. ... The deliberate dehumanization of whole groups of people; the references to police, to violence, to the 'bloodbath' that Trump has said will unfold if he doesn't win; the cultivation of hatred not only against immigrants but also against political opponents—none of this has been used successfully in modern American politics. But neither has this rhetoric been tried in modern American politics."; Rubin 2024; Brooks 2024: "Trump, however, has also used the term fascist to describe Harris as he has doubled down on his insults against Harris and ratcheted up the intensity of his own rhetoric against political opponents. 'She's a marxist, communist, fascist, socialist', Trump said at a rally in Arizona in September. Johnson and McConnell made no mention of Trump's rhetoric in their statement, keeping the focus on their political rival."; Schmidt 2024; Balk 2024) A number of prominent scholars, former officials, and critics have drawn comparisons between him and fascist leaders with respect to authoritarian actions and rhetoric, (Note: Trumpism has been likened to Benito Mussolini's Italian fascism by historians and election experts.) while others have rejected the label.

Trump has supported political violence against opponents; many academics cited Trump's involvement in the January 6 U.S. Capitol attack as an example of fascism. Trump has been accused of racism and xenophobia with respect to his rhetoric about illegal immigrants and his policies of mass deportation and family separation. Trump's base, referred to as the MAGA movement, is sometimes analyzed as a cult of personality. Especially during his second term, several experts of fascism have characterized Trump and his allies' rhetoric and style of governance as authoritarian and have compared them to previous fascist leaders'. In contrast, some scholars have described Trump variously as an authoritarian populist, a far-right populist, a nationalist, or of a different ideology.

== Background ==
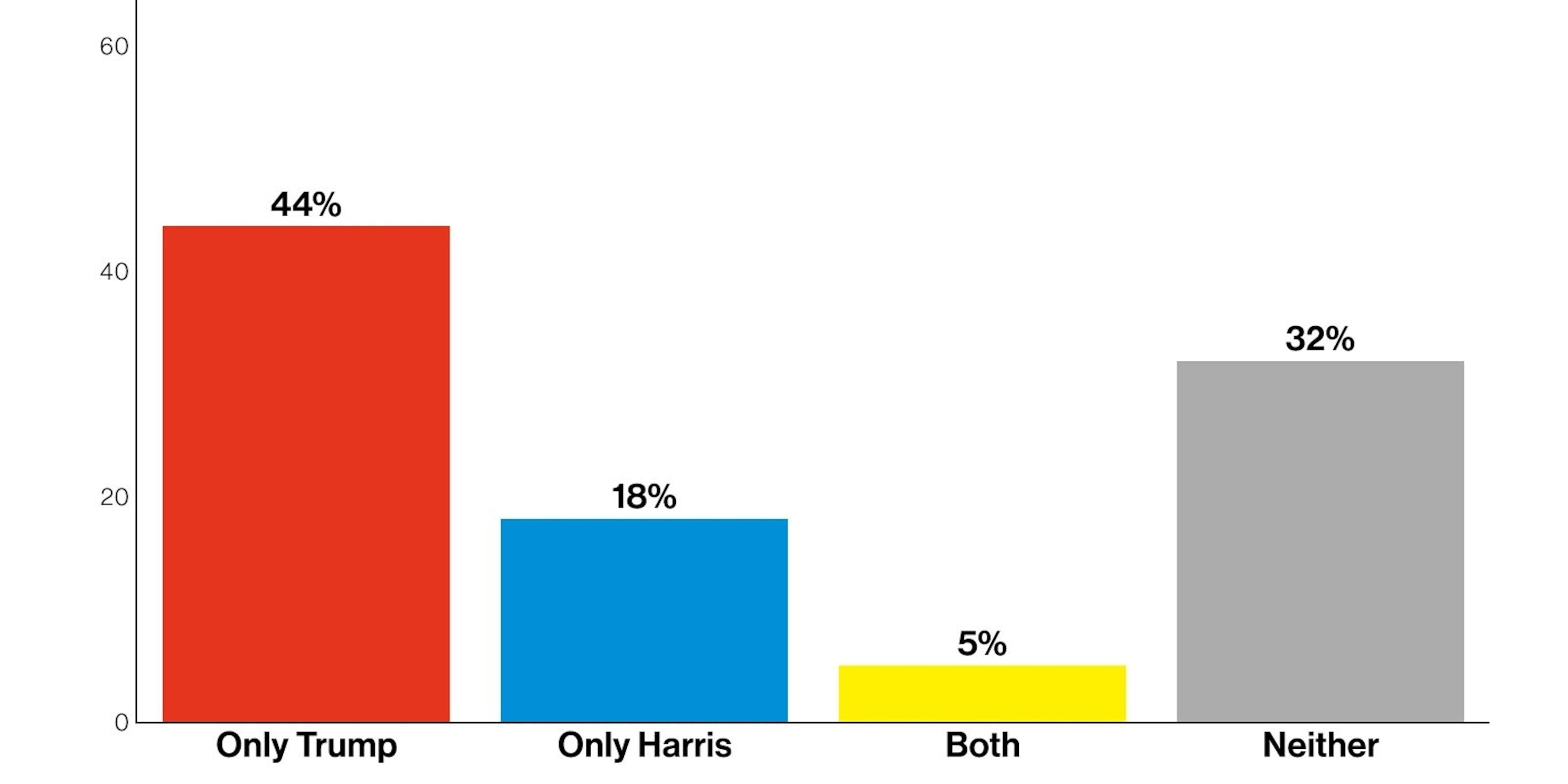
An October 2024 poll held by ABC News and Ipsos indicated that of the candidates in the 2024 United States presidential election, 49% of registered voters (Note: From a poll of 2,392 registered voters, including 44% that describe "only Trump" as fascist and 5% that describe both Trump and Harris as fascists.) considered Trump to be a fascist.

Donald Trump is an American politician, media personality, and businessman who served as the 45th president of the United States from 2017 to 2021 and has served as the 47th president since January 2025. He ran three times as the Republican Party's candidate for the presidency, winning against Hillary Clinton in 2016, losing to Joe Biden in 2020, and winning again facing Kamala Harris in 2024.

Fascism is an ideological term which refers to a broad set of aspirations and influences that emerged in the early 20th century, exemplified by the European dictators Benito Mussolini, Adolf Hitler, and Francisco Franco; and includes elements of nationalism, enforcement of social hierarchies, hatred towards social minority groups, opposition to liberalism, the cult of personality, racism, and the love of militaristic symbols.

Since Trump was elected to office in 2016, many academics have compared Trump's politics to fascism. Several have pointed out that contrasts exist between historical fascism and Trump's politics. Many also argued that "fascist elements" have operated within and around Trump's ideology and movement. Following the January 6 United States Capitol attack, some voices within the academic community felt that things had changed and that Trump's politics and connections with fascism deserved greater scrutiny. According to an October 2024 poll held by ABC News and Ipsos, 49% of American registered voters considered Trump to be a fascist, defined in the poll as "a political extremist who seeks to act as a dictator, disregards individual rights, and threatens or uses force against their opponents," while 23% considered Kamala Harris to be a fascist. Another YouGov survey from the same year reported that about 20% of Americans believed that Trump saw Hitler as completely bad; among Republican respondents, four in ten believed that Trump held such a position. The same poll reported that nearly half of Trump voters would continue to support a political candidate even if they stated that Hitler had done some good things, a position that was held by a quarter of all respondents.

== Comparisons ==
=== Anti-democratic sentiment and illiberalism ===
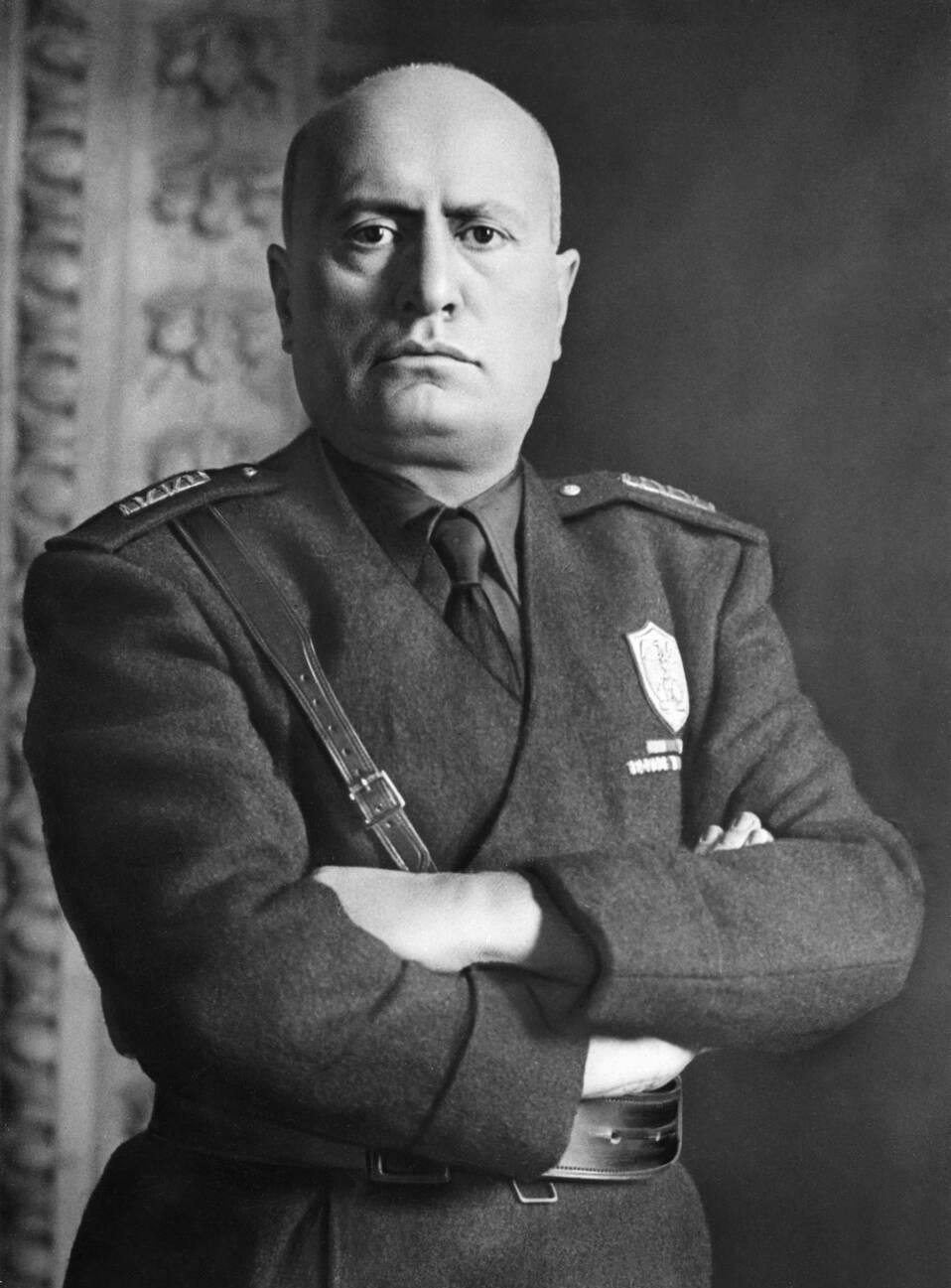
Historians and election experts have compared Trump's anti-democratic tendencies and egotistical personality to the sentiments and rhetoric of Benito Mussolini and Italian fascism.

Trumpism has been likened to Benito Mussolini's Italian fascism by critics of Trump. Historians and election experts have compared Trump's anti-democratic tendencies and egotistical personality to the sentiments and rhetoric of Benito Mussolini and Italian fascism. Trumpism heavily features authoritarian elements, rather than fascist and neo-fascist ones. Several scholars have rejected comparisons with fascism, instead viewing Trump as authoritarian and populist.

During his 2016 campaign, Trump implied that he would not accept the election results if he did not win, preemptively claiming that he could only lose due to electoral fraud. Following his defeat by Joe Biden in the 2020 United States presidential election, Trump and other Republicans tried to overturn the results, making widespread false claims of fraud. Due to these false claims, in addition to the January 6 United States Capitol attack that Trump incited, political opponents have labeled Trump as a "threat to democracy."

By 2020, journalist Patrick Cockburn stated that Trump's politics risked turning the United States into an illiberal democracy similar to Turkey, Poland, Hungary, Brazil, and the Philippines. According to civil rights lawyer Burt Neuborne and political theorist William E. Connolly, Trump's rhetoric employs tropes similar to those used by fascists in Germany to persuade citizens (at first a minority) to give up democracy by using a barrage of falsehoods, half-truths, personal invective, xenophobia, national-security scares, religious bigotry, white racism, exploitation of economic insecurity, and a never-ending search for scapegoats. Some research has highlighted Trump's connections to neoliberalism and has argued that his policies represent an intensification of such policies as part of a "fascist creep" on American politics. Corporatocracy and plutocracy are concepts often used to describe corporate elitism associated with Trump.

During his 2024 campaign, Trump has made numerous authoritarian and antidemocratic statements. Trump's previous comments, such as suggesting he can "terminate" the Constitution to reverse his election loss; his claim that he would only be a dictator on "day one" of his presidency and not after; (Note: Attributed to multiple references: Ronaldi 2023; Graham 2023; Wren 2023; Jackson 2023; Gold 2023b; Alfero 2023) his promise to use the Justice Department to go after his political enemies; and his plan to use the Insurrection Act of 1807 to deploy the military in Democratic cities and states, have raised concerns over Trump's rhetoric.

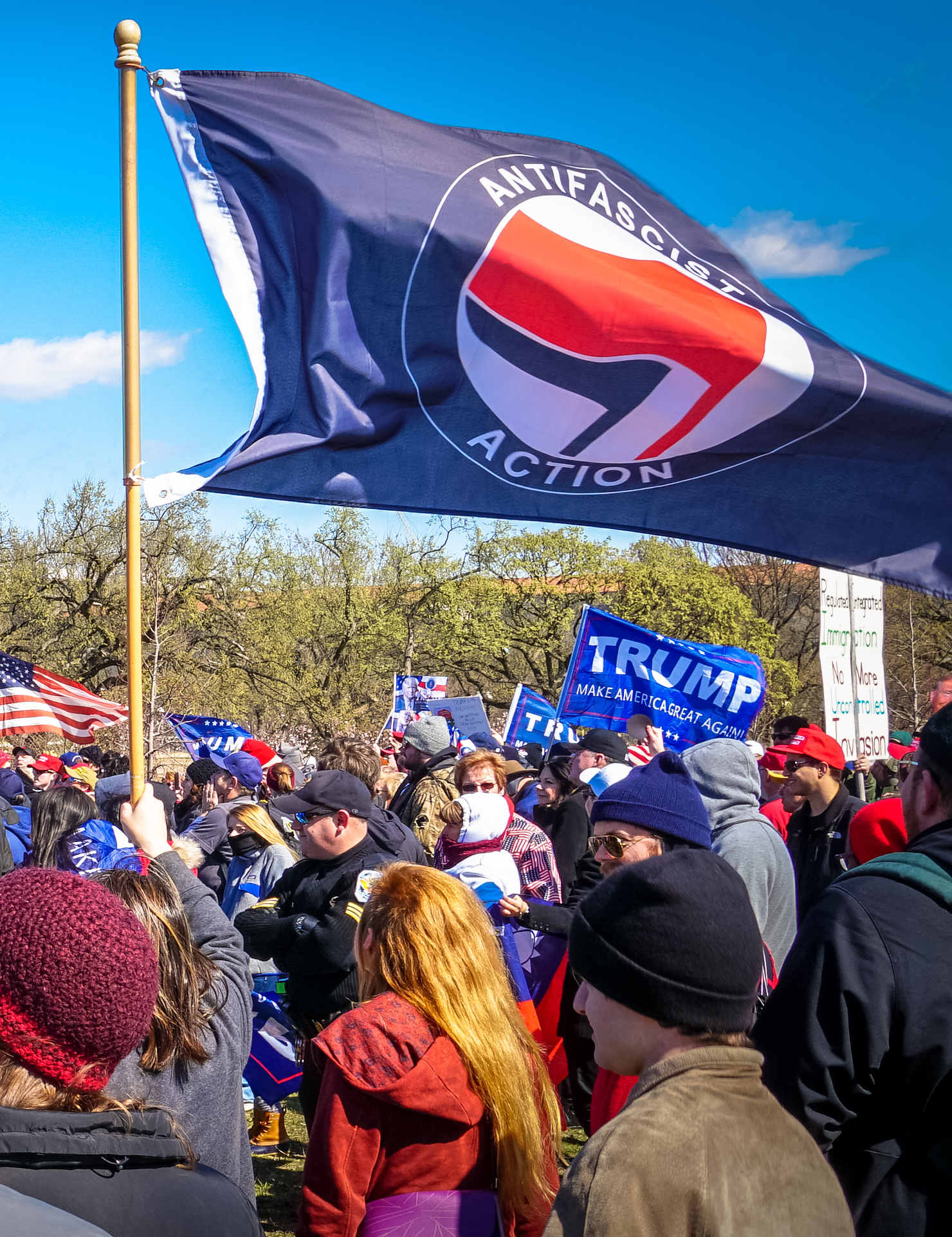
During his tenure as president, Trump and his allies attempted to designate Antifa, an opposition movement, as a terrorist organization. Previous attempts at framing opponents of fascism as terrorists were also done by 1930s fascists.

Trump has stated that he would deploy the military on American soil to fight "the enemy from within," which he describes as "radical left lunatics" and Democratic politicians such as Adam Schiff. His political rhetoric since 2016 has been based on an us vs. them framework, with the in-group being defined as "real Americans" and the rival out-groups including Muslims, leftists, intellectuals, and immigrants. He has repeatedly encouraged weaponized chants at his rallies, including calls to imprison 2016 Democratic presidential candidate Hillary Clinton. He has promoted the conspiracy theory that Jewish philanthropist George Soros was responsible for a large influx of illegal immigration from Mexico to the United States. Since 2020, he has lashed out at school and college teachers deemed to be "marxists" controlling the American institutions. Philosopher Jason Stanley linked this strategy to former and current fascist statesmen who try to undermine democracy by replacing teachers with loyalists.

Trump has repeatedly voiced support for outlawing political dissent and criticism he considers misleading or challenges his claims to power. After General Mark Milley said that Trump would start persecuting his political opponents if he won the 2024 presidential election, Trump suggested that Milley should be executed for treason, with Republican representative Paul Gosar further stating that, in a better society, "sodomy-promoting General Milley would be hung." Retired general Barry McCaffrey said, regarding Trump's statements, that "what we are seeing is a parallel to the 1930s in Nazi Germany." Trump's formal policy plan for a second term, Agenda 47, has been characterized as fascist. Historian Ruth Ben-Ghiat stated that the similarities between the Heritage Foundation's Project 2025 and Mussolini's "Laws for the Defense of the State," which transformed Italy into a repressive regime, are "striking," citing the elimination of judicial independence and the strengthening of executive authority.

How Democracies Die author Daniel Ziblatt said that Trump's combined employment of false allegations against his political opponents and allusions of exacting retribution for American patriots is similar to tactics used by Venezuela's Hugo Chávez and 1930s European fascists. An analysis by NPR found that between 2022 and October 2024, "Trump has made more than 100 threats to investigate, prosecute, imprison, or otherwise punish his perceived opponents."

In a video that was retroactively set to private, on April 1, 2026 President Trump states "...They call me king now. Do you believe it? No king. I'm such a king, I can't get a ballroom approved. It's pretty amazing, right? I'm a king. If I was a king, we'd be doing a lot more. I'm doing a lot, but I could be doing a lot more if I was a king."

In February 2025, Trump posted a computer-generated image of himself wearing a crown, declaring "Long live the king!" Critics took this as evidence of Trump having monarchist tendencies. Trump said in January 2026 that "sometimes you need a dictator."

=== Political violence ===
Trump has repeatedly expressed support for violent actions by law enforcement and his supporters since the early days of his first presidential campaign in August 2015. He was reported to have called for undocumented immigrants to be shot in the leg as a way of deterrence. He suggested that his hecklers be "knocked the hell" out by his supporters and praised then-House candidate Greg Gianforte after he body-slammed The Guardian reporter Ben Jacobs while he was asking questions, stating that "any guy who can do a body slam is my kind of guy." Trump said at a 2016 rally that, "I could stand in the middle of 5th Avenue and shoot somebody and I wouldn't lose voters." He had previously joked about the topic of killing journalists several times prior, including when he said that he "would never kill them," before reconsidering: "Uh, let's see, uh? ... No I wouldn't. I would never kill them, but I do hate them. And some of them are such lying, disgusting people, it's true." Some historians consider Trump's praise of violence against his critics, among other behaviors, as fitting a characteristic of fascism.

In a Missouri rally that resulted in multiple fights and arrests, Trump complained, after being interrupted by protesters, that there were no longer any "consequences" for protesting and stated that, "You know, part of the problem and part of the reason it takes so long is nobody wants to hurt each other anymore, right?" In a 2017 speech directed at law-enforcement officers, Trump encouraged them to be "rough" on suspects. Trump has described, in 2016, instances of violence at his rallies as "appropriate."

He said during the 2016 election that "the Second Amendment people" could prevent the nomination of Democratic Supreme Court justices. In 2019, he stated that "I have the support of the police, the support of the military, the support of the Bikers for Trump, I have the tough people, but they don't play it tough until they go to a certain point, and then it would be very bad, very bad." In a 2018 interview with Axios reporter Jim Vandehei, the interviewer asked, "When you're saying 'enemy of the people, enemy of the people,' ... what happens if all of a sudden someone gets shot, somebody shoots one of these reporters?" to which Trump answered, "It is my only form of fighting back." Trump has praised modern authoritarian leaders several times. In 2016, he expressed respect for Kim Jong Un for murdering his uncle, saying, "It's incredible. He wiped out the uncle. He wiped out this one, that one." He has praised Vladimir Putin several times, and, in 2018, he spoke positively of Xi Jinping's ability to eliminate his term limits. About the Tiananmen Square protests, he said that "when the students poured into Tiananmen Square, the Chinese government almost blew it. Then they were vicious; they were horrible; but they put it down with strength. That shows you the power of strength." Trump has often used negative terms to describe democratic leaders, calling Germany's Angela Merkel "stupid," Canada's Justin Trudeau "two-faced," and France's Emmanuel Macron "very, very nasty." He called Egyptian President Abdel Fattah el-Sisi "my favorite dictator."

During the George Floyd protests, Trump urged his general Mark Milley to take charge of dealing with the protesters. After Milley resisted, saying that the National Guard should be deployed instead, Trump told his staff, "You are all losers!" and asked Mark Milley, "Can't you just shoot them? Just shoot them in the legs or something?" Subsequently, Milley wrote a letter of resignation for Trump, which stated, referring to America's role in the Second World War, that "that generation, like every generation, has fought against that, has fought against fascism, has fought against Nazism, has fought against extremism... It's now obvious to me that you don't understand that world order. You don't understand what the war was all about. In fact, you subscribe to many of the principles that we fought against." He ultimately decided not to send the letter to Trump and stayed in his position.

In June 2020, after General Milley refused to engage with George Floyd protesters, Trump staged a dramatic walk alongside him (in the green uniform at 0:17) and his other staff through Lafayette Square in order to take a picture holding the Bible. Both Milley and defense secretary Mark Esper, who also participated in the walk, feared that this stunt would politicize the military. Milley then drafted a resignation letter stating that Trump betrayed the values of the American generation that "has fought against fascism".

Protesters being dispersed by police ahead of Trump's arrival to the George Floyd protests. Authoritarianism expert Ruth Ben-Ghiat said that, "this was an authoritarian spectacle... A cocktail of all the elements authoritarians have used in history: a lawless ruler attacking protesters."

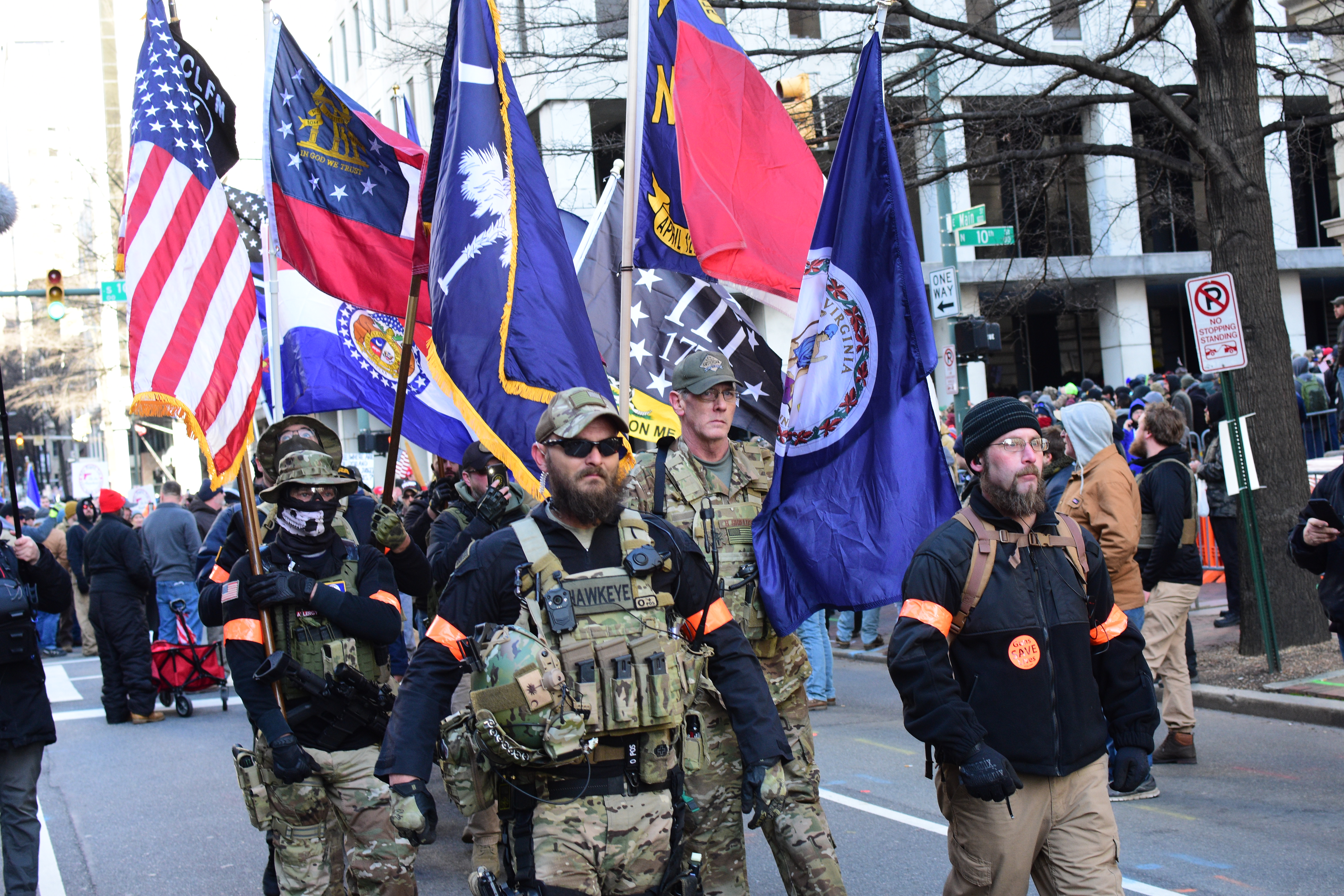
Three Percenters at a Virginia rally, January 2020

Bob Dreyfuss, writing for The Nation, notes that Trump has been offered support and security by paramilitary groups including the Oath Keepers, the Proud Boys, and the Three Percenters, and Dreyfuss proposes a parallel to the civilian militias that Hitler and Mussolini engaged. He describes Mussolini's Fasci Italiani di Combattimento, which was established in the early 1920s as a decentralized street militia that would attack his political opponents, and Hitler's Sturmabteilung (SA), which provided protection to Hitler during his street events and engaged in violence against political opponents, violently taking control of the city of Coburg in November 1922. Trump told the Proud Boys to "stand back and stand by" in 2020, before the group participated in the January 6 attack, and during Trump's presidency, several of his armed supporters occupied several state capitols, organized around the Mexican border, and engaged in street fights with Antifa and Black Lives Matter protesters. After a Black protester was beaten by his supporters during a 2015 rally, Trump said that the man "should have been roughed up." Fascism scholar Steve Ross said that, although he did not believe that Trump was Hitler, "We had the same thing happening in Germany in the 1920s with people being roughed up by the Brownshirts, and they deserved it because they were Jews and Marxists and radicals and dissidents and gypsies. That was what Hitler was saying."

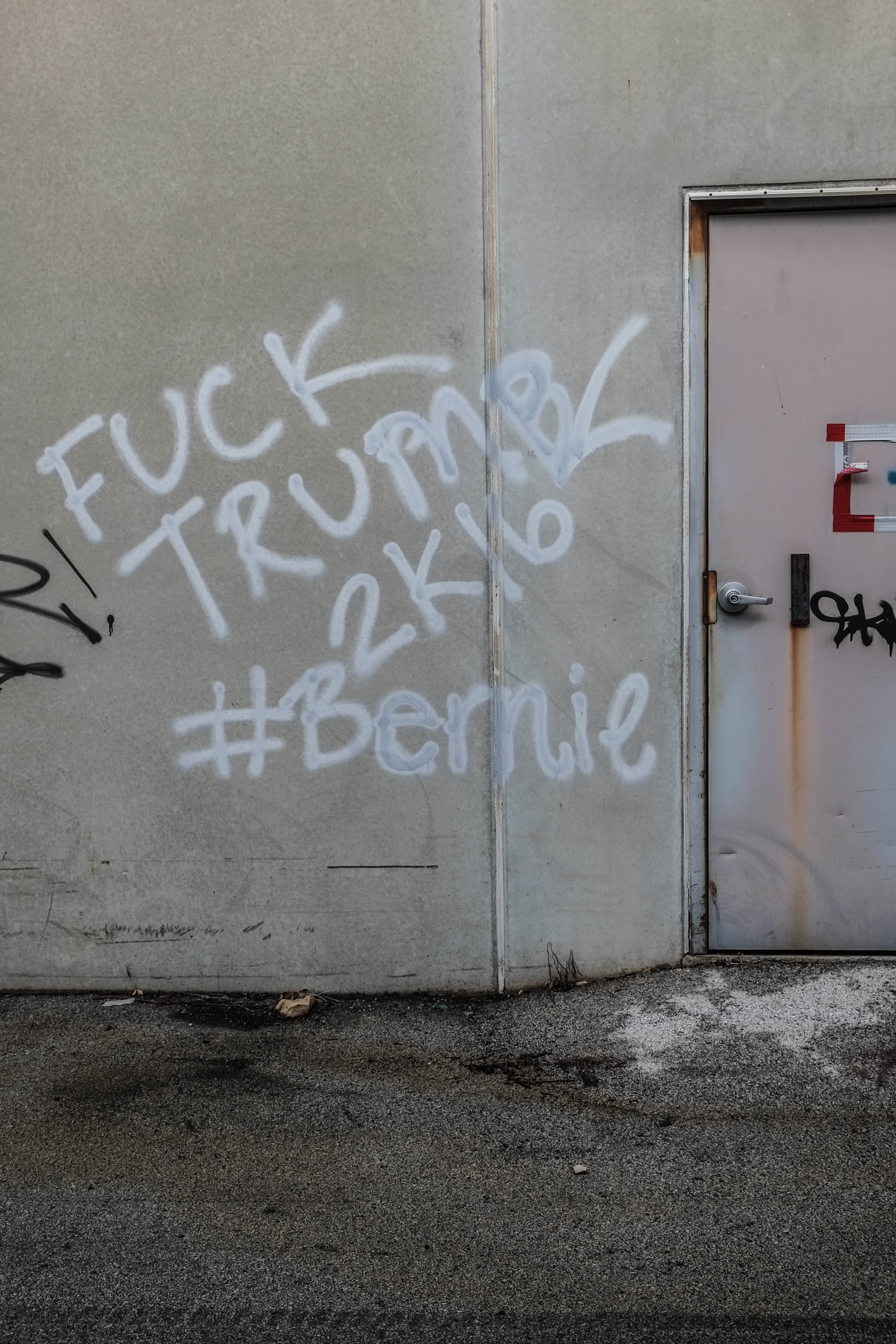
During the 2016 election, several fights broke out between Trump supporters and those of Hillary Clinton and Bernie Sanders. Both Clinton and Sanders distanced themselves from their violent supporters. Trump, conversely, has praised violent actions by his supporters several times and offered to pay their legal fees. In the same year, Trump accused Sanders of sending "his disruptors" to his events and tweeted, "Be careful Bernie, or my supporters will go to yours!"

After a protester was removed from his rally in 2016, Trump said, "Try not to hurt him. If you do, I'll defend you in court. Don't worry about it." In the same year, he said, "If you see someone getting ready to throw tomatoes, knock the crap out of them, would you? Seriously. OK. Just knock the hell... I promise you, I will pay for the legal fees." He said, "I love the old days, you know? You know what I hate? There's a guy totally disruptive, throwing punches. We're not allowed to punch back anymore. I love the old days. You know what they used to do to guys like that when they were in a place like this? They'd be carried out on a stretcher, folks." Trump said in the same year, about an anti-Trump protester that was being removed from his rally, that "I'd like to punch him in the face."

==== January 6 attack ====
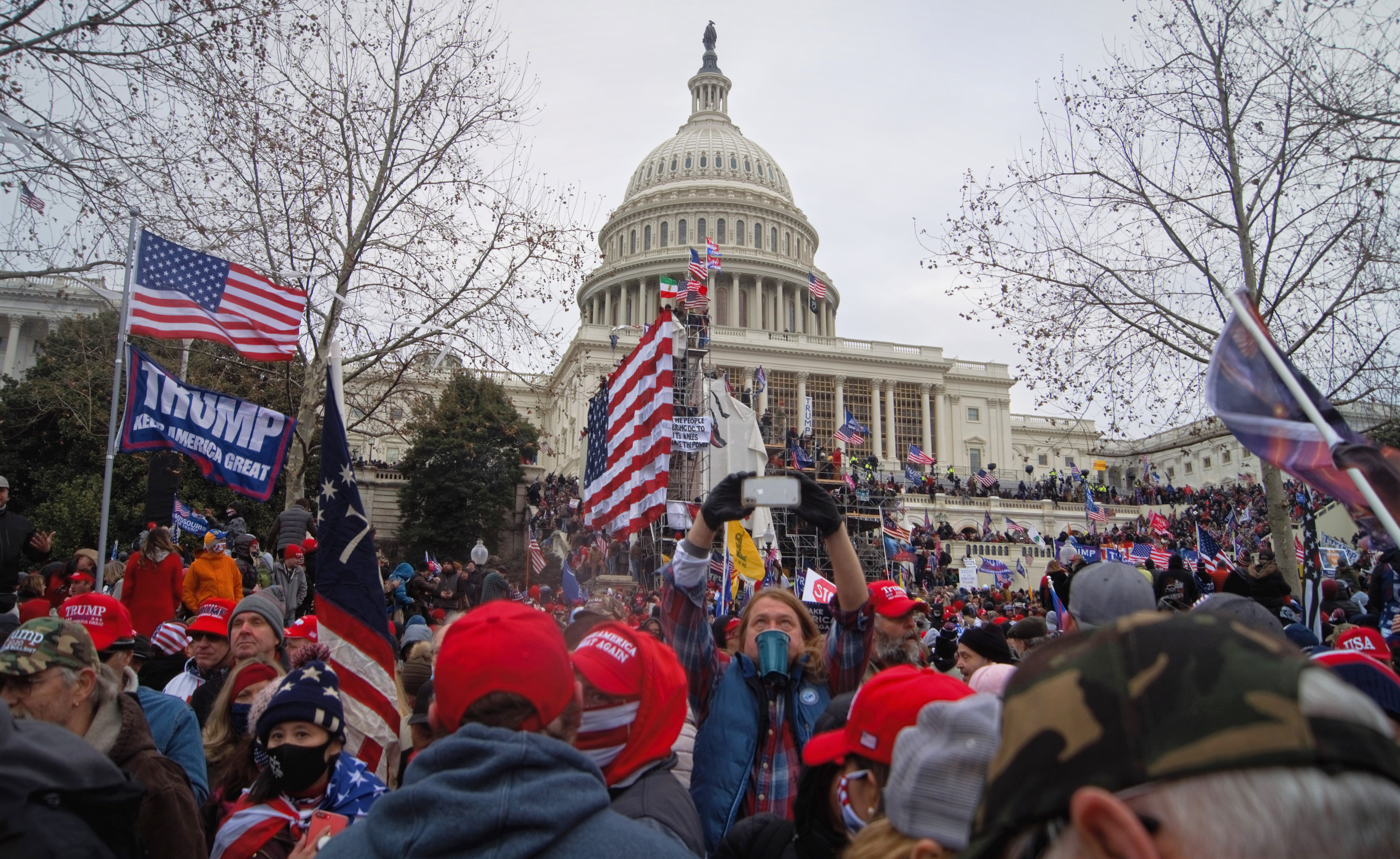
The January 6 United States Capitol attack has been compared to the Beer Hall Putsch by some academics.

The attack on the United States Capitol by supporters of Donald Trump on January 6, 2021, has been compared by some academics to the Beer Hall Putsch, a failed coup attempt in Germany by Nazi Party leader Adolf Hitler against the Weimar government in 1923.

Anatomy of Fascism author Robert Paxton, a political scientist and historian specializing in the study of fascism, previously denied that Trump should be labeled a fascist but changed his views following the January 6 attack. Paxton saw the attack on the Capitol as similar to both Mussolini's 1922 march on Rome, in which his blackshirts successfully took over Italy's capital, and the 1934 far-right anti-parliamentary riot in Paris; however, he also believes that "the word 'fascism' has been debased into epithet, making it a less and less useful tool for analyzing political movements of our times." In 2024, Historian Ruth Ben-Ghiat wrote that, just as Mussolini eventually pardoned the Blackshirts who helped him ascend to power, "Trump has also already vowed to pardon" his supporters who were convicted of crimes related to January 6. In 2025, Trump pardoned nearly every January 6 Capitol rioter, including those who assaulted police officers and defendants with domestic violence, manslaughter, "production of child sexual abuse material," rape, and child sexual abuse on their criminal records.

==== Storming of Michigan state capitol ====
On April 30, 2020, less than a year prior to the January 6 attack and two weeks after Trump published social media posts urging his supporters to "liberate" the state of Michigan from COVID-19 policies, hundreds of Trump supporters, including militia members, gathered around the Michigan state capitol to prevent a public health measure from coming into effect. About 100 protesters entered the capitol, where they displayed nooses and carried Confederate flags, as well as signs that read "Tyrants Get the Rope." During the incident, Trump endorsed the protesters and urged Governor Gretchen Whitmer to negotiate with them, tweeting that "These are very good people, but they are angry. They want their lives back again, safely! See them, talk to them, make a deal with the protesters." The protesters successfully convinced Republican state senators to kill the measure.

American Journal of Public Health editor Alfredo Morabia cited the Michigan attacks, the plot to kidnap Whitmer, and other incidents of disruption by armed political groups as build-ups to the January 6 attacks.

=== Dehumanization against political opponents and minorities ===
Trump's embrace of far-right extremism and several statements and actions have been accused of echoing fascism, Nazi rhetoric, far-right ideology, antisemitism, and white supremacy. In 2018, Dr. Mike Cole, emeritus professor in education and equality at Bishop Grosseteste University (UK), stated that Trump's racist and fascistic rhetoric and accompanying agenda targeted people of color in the US and elsewhere, and his use of Twitter promoted a public pedagogy of hate to add legitimacy to fascism. Cole highlighted neo-Nazi Andrew Anglin's connections to the alt-right to claim it is a new (neo-)fascist movement, but with links to older fringe white supremacist movements, rather than just a component of right-wing conservatism. Mattias Gardell has argued that Trump's "key fascist vision of national rebirth" featured "banal nationalism, Americanism, nativism, white supremacy, manifest destiny, and racialized discourse and practice." Gardell argues that while most Trump voters were not fascist, his rhetoric featured a return to "fascist elements" of political nostalgia, and that a "heterogeneous milieu of white nationalists, radical traditionalists, alt-right identitarians, conspiracy exposers, militias, neo-Confederates, and sovereign citizens" were knowingly catered to by Trump, which related to an important "affective dimension that fascism frequently caters to."

Trump's comments comparing his political enemies to "vermin" who will be "rooted out" have been compared by several historians to fascistic rhetoric made by Adolf Hitler and Benito Mussolini. During a rally in 2023, Trump stated:

In honor of our great veterans on Veterans Day, we pledge to you that we will root out the communists, Marxists, fascists, and the radical-left thugs that live like vermin within the confines of our country—that lie and steal and cheat on elections, and will do anything possible; they'll do anything, whether legally or illegally, to destroy America, and to destroy the American Dream.

The comments were compared to comments made by Nazi politician Wilhelm Kube in February 1933 in a Nazi propaganda publication where he stated, "The Jews, like vermin, form a line from Potsdamerplatz until Anhalter Bahnhof ... The only way to smoke out the vermin is to expel them." They were also compared to the British Union of Fascists, who referred to Jews as "rats and vermin from the gutters of Whitechapel," and a 1934 interview with Hitler where he stated, "I have the right to remove millions of an inferior race that breeds like vermin!" French translator of Mein Kampf Olivier Mannoni also argued that the term "root out" was very similar to the term "ausrotten" used by Nazis, which also meant "to exterminate."

Responding to critics, Trump's campaign later said that "their sad, miserable existence will be crushed when President Trump returns to the White House," which was also criticized for echoing the rhetoric of authoritarian leaders, along with Trump's statement that "the threat from outside forces is far less sinister, dangerous, and grave than the threat from within." Our threat is from within." According to The New York Times, scholars are undecided about whether Trump's more fascist-sounding language is to antagonize the left, an evolution in his beliefs, or the "dropping of a veil." When a reporter asked Trump in 2015 about how his proposed national registry of Muslims would differ from Nazi Germany's persecution of Jews, Trump responded, "You tell me."

Since the fall of 2023, Trump has repeatedly used extreme anti-immigration rhetoric by stating that undocumented immigrants are "poisoning the blood of our country," which has been compared to language echoing that of white supremacists and Adolf Hitler's Mein Kampf. He later claimed that immigrants who commit murder have "bad genes." According to Politico, his rally speeches contain "what some experts in political rhetoric, fascism, and immigration say is a strong echo of authoritarians and Nazi ideology." Other fascistic comments include statements that immigrants are the "enemy from within" who are ruining the "fabric" of the country. Trump has stated that some immigrants are "not people," "not humans," and "animals." At rallies, Trump has stated that undocumented immigrants will "rape, pillage, thieve, plunder and kill" American citizens, that they are "stone-cold killers," "monsters," "vile animals," "savages", and "predators" that will "walk into your kitchen, they'll cut your throat" and "grab young girls and slice them up right in front of their parents." Donald Trump also threatened to examine the skulls of Jews who did not vote for him. Donald Trump called for the "remigration" of undocumented immigrants in the United States during the 2024 election, a term that is commonly used by European white identitarian movements as a euphemism for ethnic cleansing. On October 27, 2024, Trump held a rally in Madison Square Garden that featured speakers making various racist and dehumanizing remarks, including Tony Hinchcliffe's statement that Puerto Rico was an "island of garbage." The event drew comparisons from media and politicians to the 1939 Nazi rally that took place in the same location. In 2020, Trump told a nearly all-white crowd, "You have good genes ... the racehorse theory. You think we're so different?"

In January 2026, journalist Walker Bragman interviewed three genocide scholars who were concerned that the US was at the "early stages of committing genocide" against transgender people. Former presidents of the International Association of Genocide Scholars, Henry Theriault and Gregory Stanton, explained that the Trump administration wanted "to destroy a gender group," accuse them of corrupting traditional and family values, marginalize them socially and economically partly in order to urge them to kill themselves, and give tacit permission to law enforcers to use force specifically against them. Experts on genocide Stanton and Haley Brown deemed these tactics to be "directly borrowed from the Nazis."

=== Cult of personality ===
Beginning in October 2025, The New York Times editorial board published an Autocracy Index showing erosion of US democracy using various benchmarks, offering "a way to understand how much Mr. Trump is eroding American democracy" since his January 2025 inauguration. "Creating a cult of personality" is among Trump's most dominant strategies.

Historians Enzo Traverso, Ruth Ben-Ghiat, and Manon Lefebvre (experts in totalitarianism, fascism, and the United States), and the French translator of Mein Kampf, Olivier Mannoni, argued that Donald Trump fosters a cult of personality thanks to his charismatic, masculinist, reactionary, accessible, and identifiable rhetoric, where his aura matters much more than the quality of his arguments in the eyes of his followers. The four experts drew such similarities between the fascists of the 1920s–1930s and the MAGA movement.

Furthermore, the three historians believed that the cult of personality skyrocketed since the attempted assassination of Donald Trump in July 2024 by furthering Trump's charismatic aspect as a barrier between US citizens and the "enemy." As such, Trump's followers went as far as to talk about "divine intervention" when seeing that the assassination attempt failed.

=== Internment camps ===
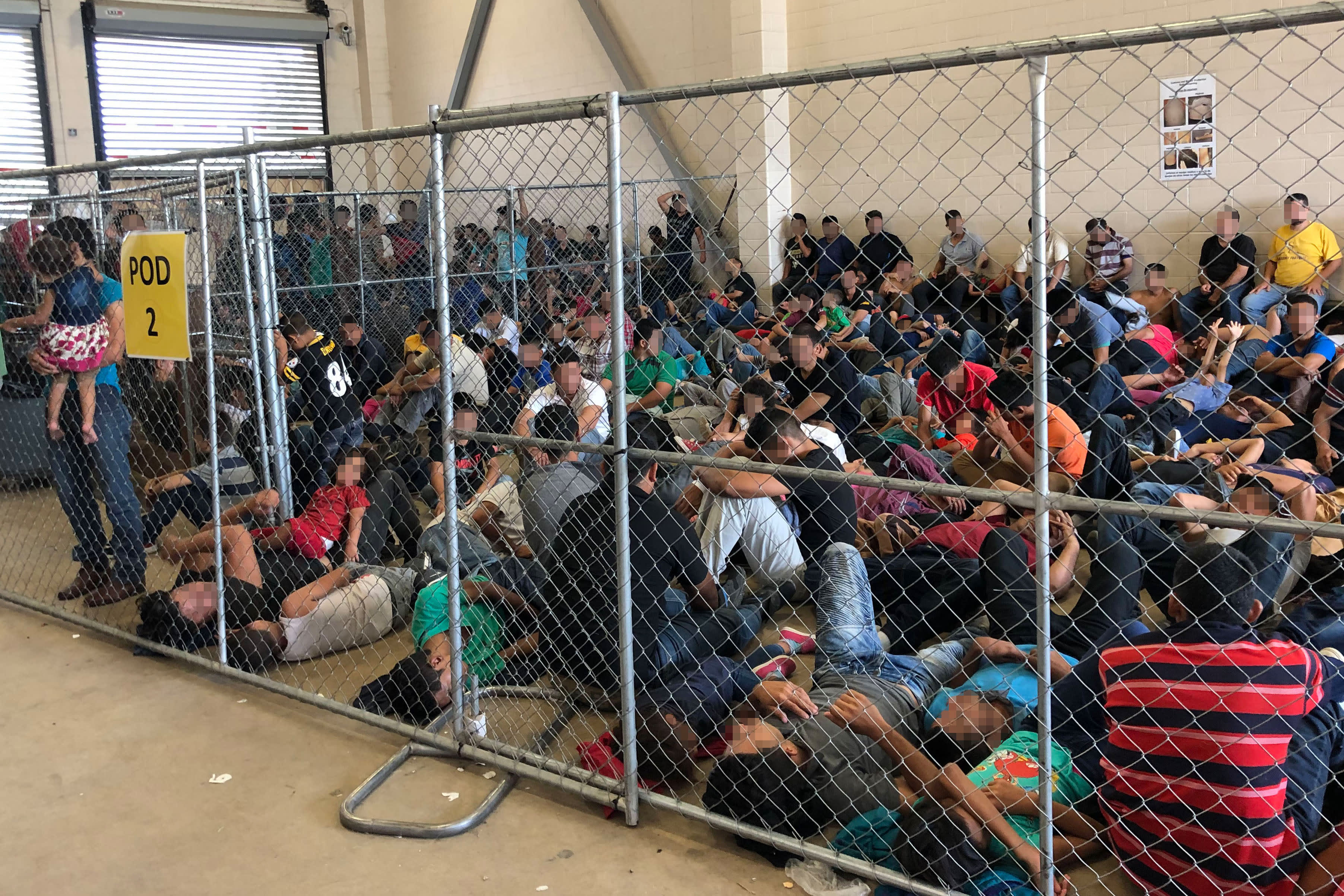
A migrant detention camp in 2019

The Trump administration family separation policy was compared to the use of internment camps under previous fascist regimes. In 2018, Trump instituted a "zero tolerance" policy that mandated the criminal prosecution of all adults who were accused of violating immigration laws by immigration authorities. This policy directly led to the large-scale, forcible separation of children and parents arriving at the United States-Mexico border, including those who were seeking asylum from violence in their home countries. Parents were arrested and put into criminal detention, while their children were taken away, classified as unaccompanied alien minors, to be put into child immigrant detention centers.

Although Trump signed an executive order that ostensibly ended the family separation component of his administration's migrant detentions in June 2018, it continued under alternative justifications into 2019.

By the end of 2018, the number of children being held had swelled to a high of nearly 15,000, which by August 2019 had been reduced to less than 9,000. In 2019, many experts, including Andrea Pitzer, the author of One Long Night: A Global History of Concentration Camps, have acknowledged the designation of the detention centers as "concentration camps" particularly given that the centers, previously cited by Texas officials for more than 150 health violations and reported deaths in custody, reflect a record typical of the history of deliberate substandard healthcare and nutrition in concentration camps. There has been significant disagreement as to whether or not to label these facilities "concentration camps."

In 2023, Current Affairs profiled how Trump, in his 2024 campaign, likewise pledged to build internment camps, warning that Trump's plan was to "build huge camps and put millions of people in them without any semblance of due process," which might include political opponents and critics.

In 2025, Trump announced plans to use the Guantanamo Bay detention camp to detain immigrants. He also began deporting immigrants, whom he claimed to be members of the Venezuelan Tren de Aragua gang, to the Terrorism Confinement Center in El Salvador, in spite of court orders to not do so. He further suggested that he would deport anti-Tesla protesters to the same prison, calling attention to the prison's cruel conditions.

=== Connections to self-identified fascists ===
In the 2016 United States presidential election, Trump was supported by multiple self-described Nazi or fascist groups, including the National Socialist Movement and Ku Klux Klan. These groups engaged in voter intimidation by monitoring polling locations in 2016, claiming to have done so both "informally" and "through the Trump campaign". In 2016, Trump was endorsed by self-identified Nazis such as David Duke, alt-right activist Richard Spencer and Nazi activist Andrew Anglin. Trump disavowed Duke in August 2015, refused to disavow him in a January 2016 interview, and wrote a tweet disavowing the former KKK leader shortly afterwards. Trump has shared social media content linked to neo-Nazi websites, refused to condemn antisemitic attacks on Jewish journalists, and, after winning the election, appointed Steve Bannon, an admirer of Mussolini, as his chief of staff. During the Charlottesville protests in Virginia, Trump stated that there were good people on both sides. Duke endorsed Trump once again during the 2020 presidential election and criticized him in 2024. In September 2024, CNN reported that Mark Robinson, whom Trump endorsed in the 2024 North Carolina gubernatorial election, had previously identified himself as a "Black Nazi". Trump's Inaugural Address was written by alt-right activists Stephen Miller and Steve Bannon.

Trump discusses the Unite the Right rally, August 2017.

Stormfront founder Don Black supported Trump for, he said, fighting against white demoralization and building a long-term movement that would outlast him. Trump was described by alt-right activist and millionaire donor William Regnery II as someone who helped white nationalism go "from being conversation you could hold in a bathroom, to the front parlor". Rocky Suhayda, chairman of a split from the American Nazi Party, said that Trump provided a "real opportunity" for his cause. White nationalist Jared Taylor supported Trump for "talking about policies that would slow the dispossession of whites" and said that "all of his policies, at least those pertaining to immigration, align very nicely with the sorts of things we've been saying for many year." Anglin, who founded The Daily Stormer, had multiple pro-Trump articles published on his website and said that "virtually every Alt-Right Nazi I know is volunteering for the Trump campaign." In November 2016, Spencer shouted "Hail Trump, hail our people, hail victory!" during a speech at a National Policy Institute convention. By November 2017, and throughout 2018, many alt-right activists expressed disappointment at Trump after he started supporting Muslims in Saudi Arabia and Jews in Israel. Trump's decision to remove Bannon from the National Security Council also impacted their impression about him.

Following Trump's victory in the 2024 presidential election, Blood Tribe leader Christopher Pohlhaus celebrated by thanking Trump that "cheaper gas will make it easier to spread White Power across the whole country." Far-right activist Lauren Witzke thanked "men, especially white men, who turned out in force to put women back in their place." Turning Point USA ambassador Evan Kilgore said in his 100,000-followers X account, "Women, back to the kitchen; Abortions, illegal; Gays, back in the closet; Interracial marriage, banned; Illegals, pack your bags; trannies, back to the asylums; Jesus, back in our schools." In November, an investigation by Politico found that a Pennsylvania-based field staffer hired by the Republican Party to work at the Trump campaign was a co-host alongside Richard Spencer at a white nationalist podcast. The podcast host, Luke Meyer, confirmed to the news organization that he was indeed a worker for the Trump campaign and was fired shortly afterward. In his podcast, he stated, "Why can't we make New York, for example, white again? Why can't we clear out and reclaim Miami?... A return to 80%, 90% white would probably be, probably the best we could hope for, to some degree." He also told Politico that, "in a few years, one of those groypers might even quietly bring me back in, with a stern warning for me to 'be more careful next time'."

In 1990, Ivana Trump, Donald Trump's former wife, stated that he kept a copy of My New Order, a collection of speeches written by Adolf Hitler, by his bedside. According to Vanity Fair reporter Marie Brenner, Trump told her in a 1990s interview that it was "my friend Marty Davis from Paramount who gave me a copy of Mein Kampf, and he's a Jew." When Brenner asked Davis if he had given the book to Trump, he said that "it was My New Order, Hitler's speeches, not Mein Kampf. I thought he would find it interesting. I am his friend, but I'm not Jewish." Trump further told Brenner that "if I had these speeches, and I am not saying that I do, I would never read them." After saying that illegal immigrants were "poisoning the blood of our country" in 2023, Trump said, "They said Hitler said that." He further stated that Hitler used those words in a different way and said, "It's true. They're destroying the blood of the country, they're destroying the fabric of our country, and we're going to have to get them out." John F. Kelly, Trump's former chief of staff, stated in October 2024 that Trump spoke positively of Hitler during his tenure as president, including by saying that "Hitler did some good things" such as rebuilding the economy. Kelly also stated that Trump had told him that he desired military generals similar to the generals who served Hitler. Kelly's statements came after Trump's statements about Hitler and his generals were reported by several books a few years prior.

In early 2016, Trump tweeted Mussolini's quote that "it is better to live one day as a lion than 100 years as a sheep," attributed to social media account @ilduce2016 (Il Duce was Mussolini's honorific), an anonymous account secretly set up by Gawker that posted #MakeAmericaGreatAgain tweets alongside Mussolini-related content and whose profile picture featured Mussolini's face with Trump's hair edited over it. When Trump was asked about the social media post in an interview with Chuck Todd, he said, "Chuck, it's OK to know it's Mussolini. Look, Mussolini was Mussolini... it's a very good quote, it's a very interesting quote, and I know it... and I know who said it. But what difference does it make whether it's Mussolini or somebody else? It's certainly a very interesting quote." In the same year, Trump shared a Twitter post from neo-Nazi account @WhiteGenocideTM, and, three weeks after, he retweeted the same account again. Two days after, he retweeted another account with the handle @EustaceFash, whose profile banner included the words "white genocide." Trump's second retweet of @WhiteGenocideTM was shortly deleted. Andrew Anglin, from The Daily Stormer, said that Trump was "giving us the old wink-wink" and that "it isn't statistically possible" that Trump could have retweeted the two accounts "back to back" by accident. Also in 2016, Trump posted an image that showed the Star of David with the words "most corrupt candidate ever" written on it, juxtaposed with the face of Hillary Clinton in front of a pile of money. The image was later deleted and replaced with another version that featured a circle instead of the Star of David.

According to NPR, Trump's golf club in Bedminster, New Jersey, twice held speeches by Nazi sympathizer Timothy Hale-Cusanelli, who had previously said that "Hitler should have finished the job." In 2022, Trump was visited by self-described Nazi musical artist Kanye West and Holocaust denier Nick Fuentes at Mar-a-Lago. West said shortly after the dinner that "I like Hitler." Trump said after the incident that he did not know who Fuentes was.

In August 2025 Henry Stout, founder of the neo-Nazi group Aryan Freedom Network, said, "Trump awakened a lot of people to the issues we've been raising for years. He's the best thing that's happened to us." He continued by stating that "our side won the election."

In an interview with Maggie Haberman and Jonathan Swan for their book Regime Change, Trump stated that "no other president could do the shit I'm doing" and compared his political power to various authoritarian figures in history. In particular, he said that he was more powerful than Napoleon, Adolf Hitler, Mao Zedong, and Joseph Stalin, saying that they "maintained power through fear".

=== White nationalism in ICE recruitment ads ===
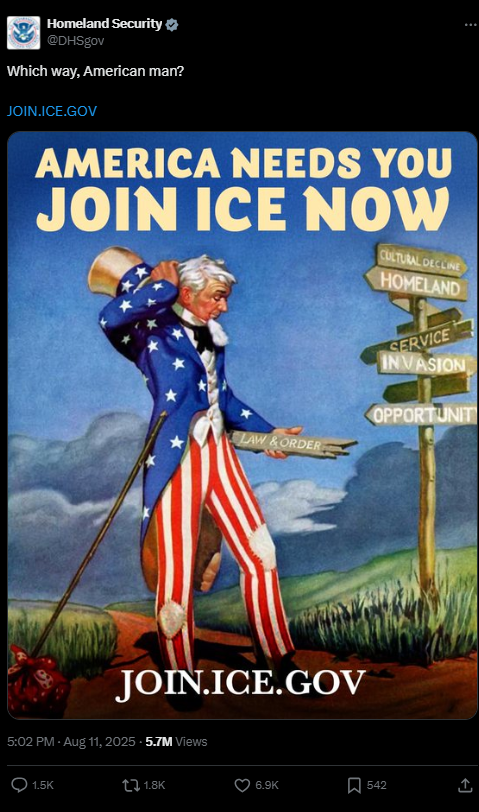
An ICE recruitment ad by Trump's Department of Homeland Security paraphrasing a quote by American neo-Nazi activist William Gayley Simpson

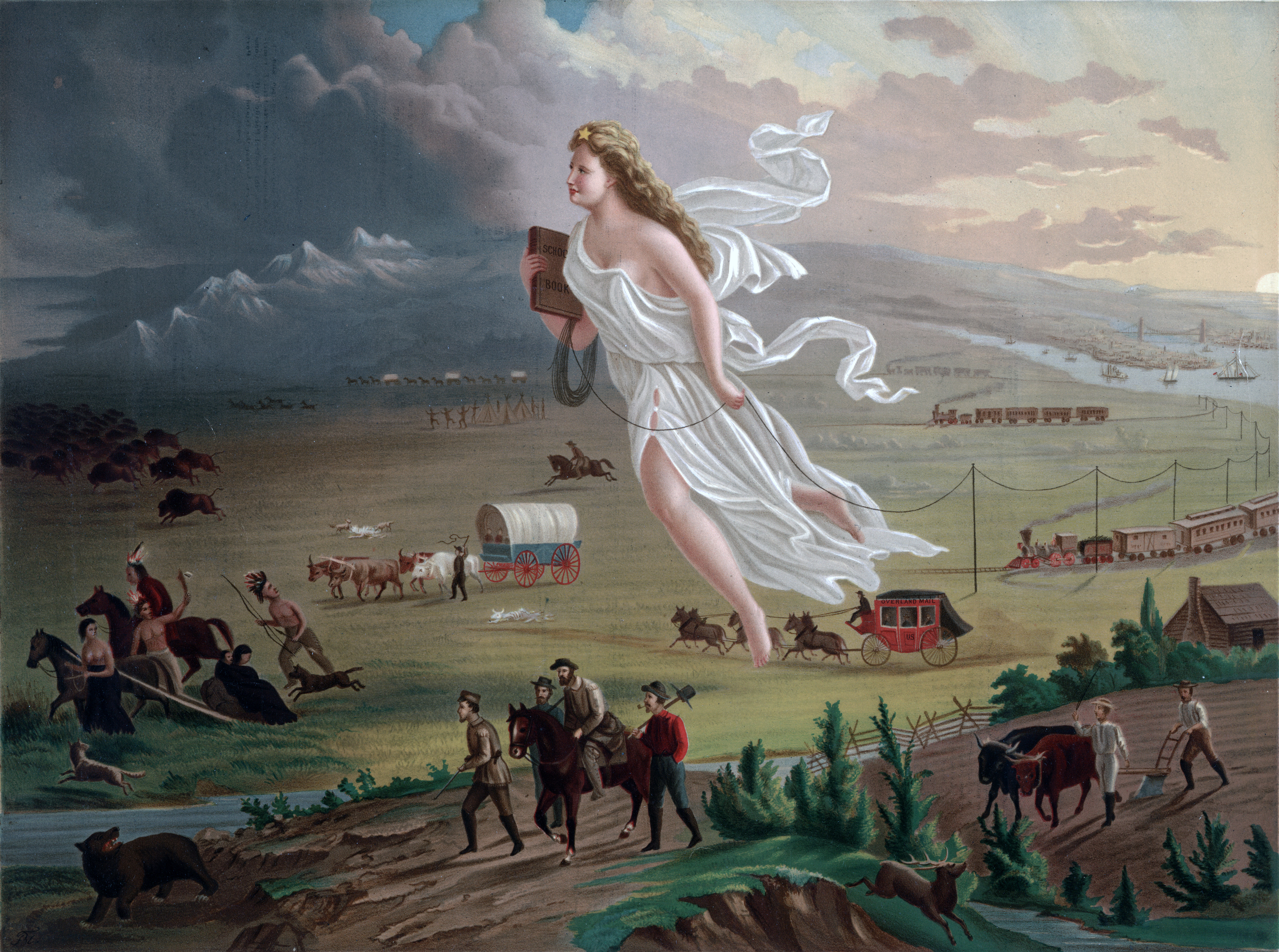
Manifest Destiny painting used in an ICE ad with the slogan "A Heritage to Be Proud Of, a Homeland Worth Defending"

ICE's aggressive and meme-heavy publicity campaign was run by political appointees in their 20s, and received criticism from political commentators and scholars for being unprofessional and intentionally cruel. The campaign noticeably re-used WWII-era US propaganda posters, several of which had text that suggested the goal of deportations was to protect American culture, and several of which were accused of promoting white nationalism by scholars and historians or were previously promoted by far-right accounts. The Southern Poverty Law Center found the DHS using "white nationalist and anti-immigrant images and slogans in recruitment materials" for ICE and that some "images and language appear to come directly from antisemitic and neo-Nazi publications and a white Christian nationalist website."

One ad shared by the White House featured the phrase "We'll Have Our Home Again", which was also the name of a song produced and popularized by white nationalist group the Pine Tree Riots. The ad was also captioned "We'll Have Our Home Again", and had "join.ice.gov" written at the bottom of the image.

Two other ads were publicized, one for ICE recruitment captioned "Which way, American man?", and the other captioned "Which way, Greenland man?", which referred to the Greenland Crisis. A connection was drawn by NBC news to Which Way Western Man?, a book published by American neo-Nazi activist William Gayley Simpson and used by white nationalist groups that praises Adolf Hitler. The title of the book is a popular internet meme among the neo-Nazi movement. When asked about the slogan by Politico, White House spokesperson Abigail Jackson accused the Politico journalist of being a "deranged leftist who claims everything they dislike must be Nazi propaganda."

Another used the slogan "One Homeland. One People. One Heritage." One Rutgers University professor drew a parallel with the Nazi slogan "One people, one realm, one leader."

=== Historical parallels ===
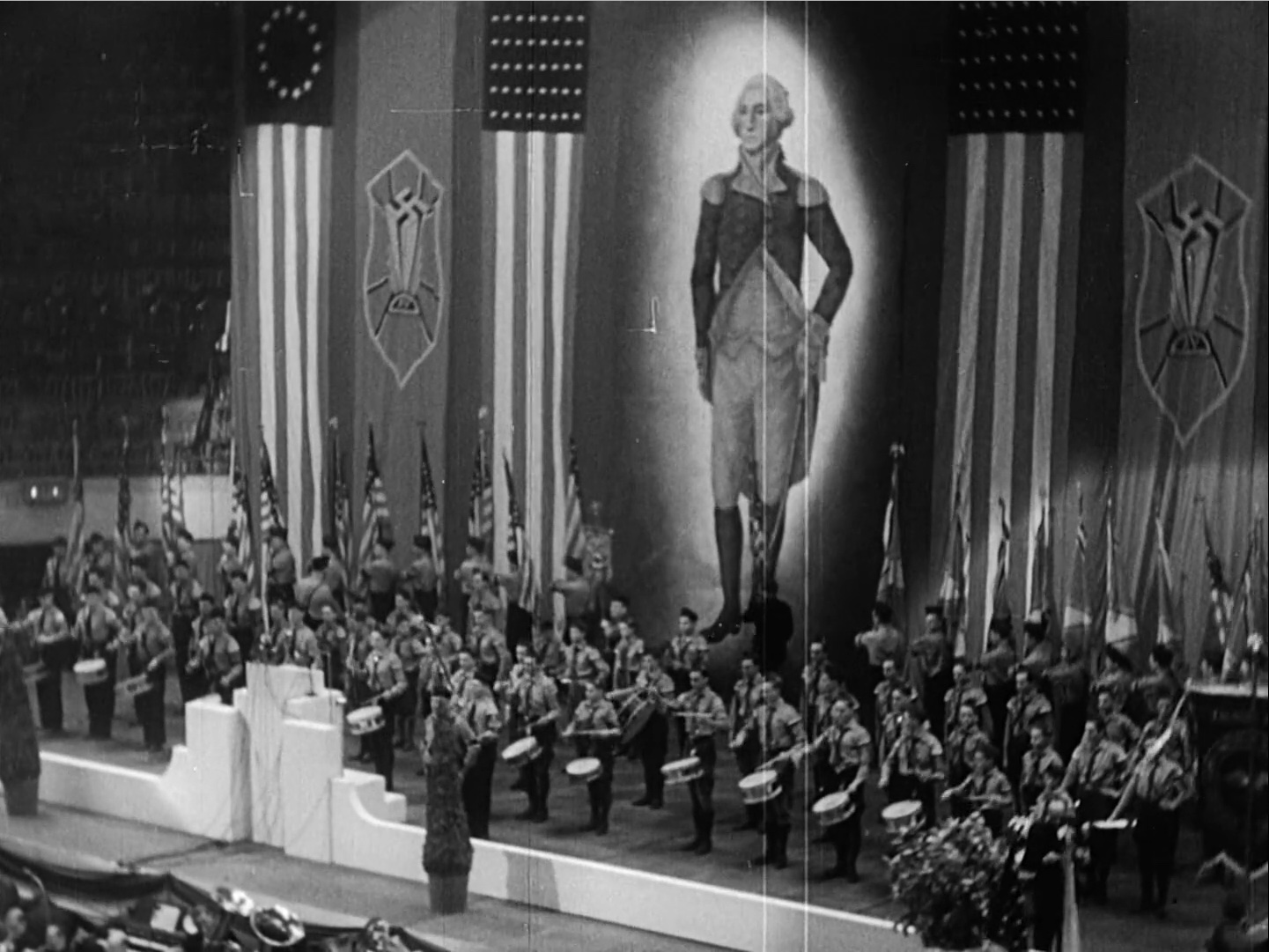
The U.S. experienced a proliferation of fascist movements during the Great Depression. The Madison Square Garden pro-Nazi rally (pictured) drew about 20,000 participants in 1939.

The idea of modern America being analogous to Weimar Germany before Hitler's seizure of power was brought up by New York Times reporter Roger Cohen and journalist Andrew Sullivan in 2015. American professor John Russo stated in 1995 that public concerns over job loss would lead to a resurgence of fascism in the United States in the future (the U.S. had previously seen a rise in fascist movements during the 1930s, partly due to the Great Depression, with Leon Milton Birkhead identifying 800 Nazi-friendly organizations in 1938). In a 1995 interview with Dale Maharidge, Russo predicted the emergence of a new American leader similar to Donald Trump, a prediction on which he doubled down in the 2020s.

Jonathan Chait stated that the decision by American conservatives of embracing Trump is analogous to that of German conservatives of supporting Hitler with the hope that they could "tame" him. The same argument was made by historians Nathan Stoltzfus and Eric Weitz. Paul Robin Krugman, in a 2016 article titled How Republics End, stated that "it takes willful blindness not to see the parallels between the rise of fascism and our current political nightmare." Geoff Eley, despite believing that Trump was not Hitler, also drew parallels between societal fears regarding globalization and immigration in contemporary America and in the 1930s. American historian Timothy Ryback, author of Takeover: Hitler's Final Rise to Power, wrote in 2024 that "our republic appears to be plagued by the myriad ills that doomed Weimar: political fragmentation, social polarization, hate-filled demagoguery, a legislature gridlocked by partisan posturing, and structural anomalies in voting processes."

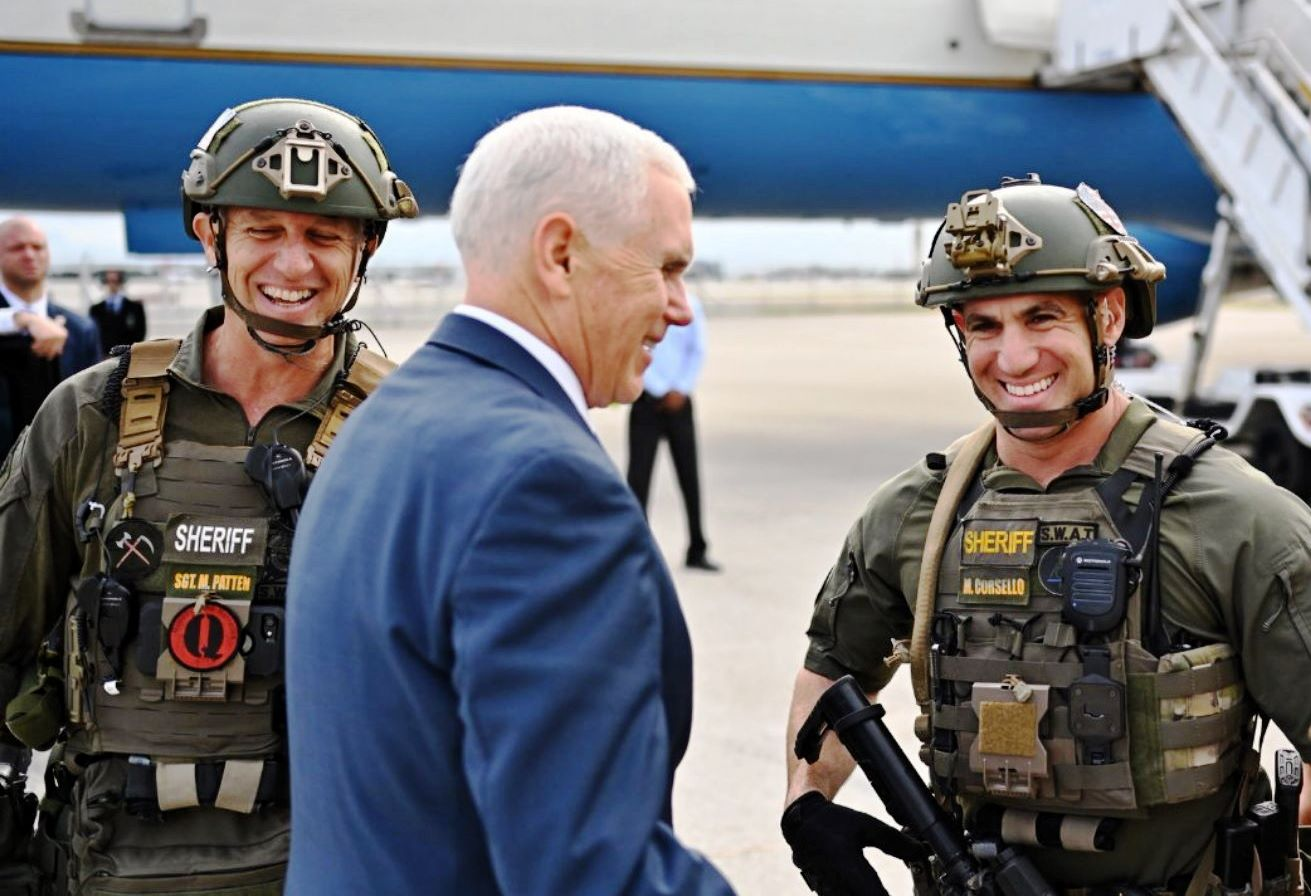
American vice-president Mike Pence posing with a police officer (left) wearing a QAnon badge, November 2018

Conspiracy theories have been a central factor in the emergence of fascist movements. Hannah Arendt wrote in 1951 that "the ideal subject of totalitarian rule is not the convinced Nazi or the convinced Communist, but people for whom the distinction between fact and fiction (i.e., the reality of experience) and the distinction between true and false (i.e., the standards of thought) no longer exists." In Germany, Nazi activists employed conspiracy theories such as The Protocols of the Elders of Zion to portray Jews as attempting to take over the world, an idea that Hitler defended in Mein Kampf. In the 21st century, QAnon became one of the most prominent conspiracy theories among the pro-Trump movement, alleging that Trump has been involved with a years-long fight with the "deep state." Its believers have included House members Marjorie Taylor Greene and Lauren Boebert. The conspiracy theory that white people were being deliberately ethnically replaced by immigrants also became prominent and was promoted by Fox News' Tucker Carlson. A 2022 survey carried out by the Southern Poverty Law Center and Turchin Research involving 1,500 respondents reported that nearly 70% of Republicans believed "to at least some extent" this was taking place.

In Weimar Germany, Hitler scapegoated the Jews as one of the causes of the Great Depression. During the 1930s, public support for centrist parties diminished and political infighting broke among leftist parties, which resulted in there being no unified opposition to the NSDAP. Time writer Christine Adams said that although the current political state of the United States may seem analogous to that of Weimar Germany, the presence of a cross-ideological opposition to Trump is a factor that makes America different from Germany in the 1930s.

David Dyzenhaus wrote that although the government of the United States, including conservative judges and Vice President Mike Pence, managed to reject Trump's attempts at overturning election results, the state of democracy in Weimar Germany was also "similarly salvageable" until late 1932, for which reason the analogy between Weimar Germany and 2024 America is, he stated, strong. In that year, the Staatsgerichtshof, the court responsible for settling constitutional disputes related to the federal government and the states, upheld the constitutionality of the right-wing German government's decision to change the government of Prussia under an emergency clause of the Weimar Constitution, a decision that is regarded as a precursor to Hitler's rise to power in the following year. Dyzenhaus stated that the decisions of the mostly conservative U.S. Supreme Court during Trump's post-2024 tenure as president will affect the future of American democracy analogously to how the Staatsgerichtshof's decisions affected German politics in the 1930s. Trump has stated that he would, if re-elected in 2024, use the Insurrection Act to suppress dissident protesters. Holocaust historian Christopher R. Browning wrote in 2022 that a hypothetical emergence of a minority-ruled, authoritarian government in the United States led by Donald Trump and his Republican allies would resemble more an illiberal democracy than a Nazi-like dictatorship. Browning stated that the appointment of election deniers to key positions in state governments in the United States was an "ominous warning" and that the patterns of behavior of the Republican Party amounted to an attempt at a "legal revolution", a term coined by German historian Karl Dietrich Bracher to describe the legal pathways that the Nazi Party undertook in order to seize power following Hitler's unsuccessful 1923 coup attempt.

After Hitler lost his 1932 run for presidency by a margin of 6 million voters, he claimed voter fraud and went to court in order to overturn the election results. According to Hitler, his party had actually gotten 2 million more votes than what was recorded. His case was ultimately dismissed, with a judge stating that the high margin by which Hitler lost precluded the possibility of any significant fraud. At that time, the New York Times published an article titled Hitler to Contest Validity of Election.

=== Authoritarianism ===
In September 2025, historians Diana Garvin, Tiffany Florvil and Claudia Koonz argued Donald Trump's government was weaponizing and objectifying women similarly to previous fascist regimes. They explained that like fascist Italy and Nazi Germany, Trump pushes natalistic policies mixed with white supremacy, normalizes the idea of the female body being "state resources," and relies on women's serfdom to bash themselves and other women.

In October 2025, political scientist Asma Mhalla argues Trump's second administration is fascist since the state wants to enhance its power in order to achieve the rank of a Hobbesian Leviathan by "accelerat[ing] authoritarianism." Nonetheless, she expresses differences with original fascism because of alliances with tech moguls, massive use of social media, and proximity to neoreactionary accelerationism, partly in order to curb China's growing clout.

== Invocations of the comparison ==
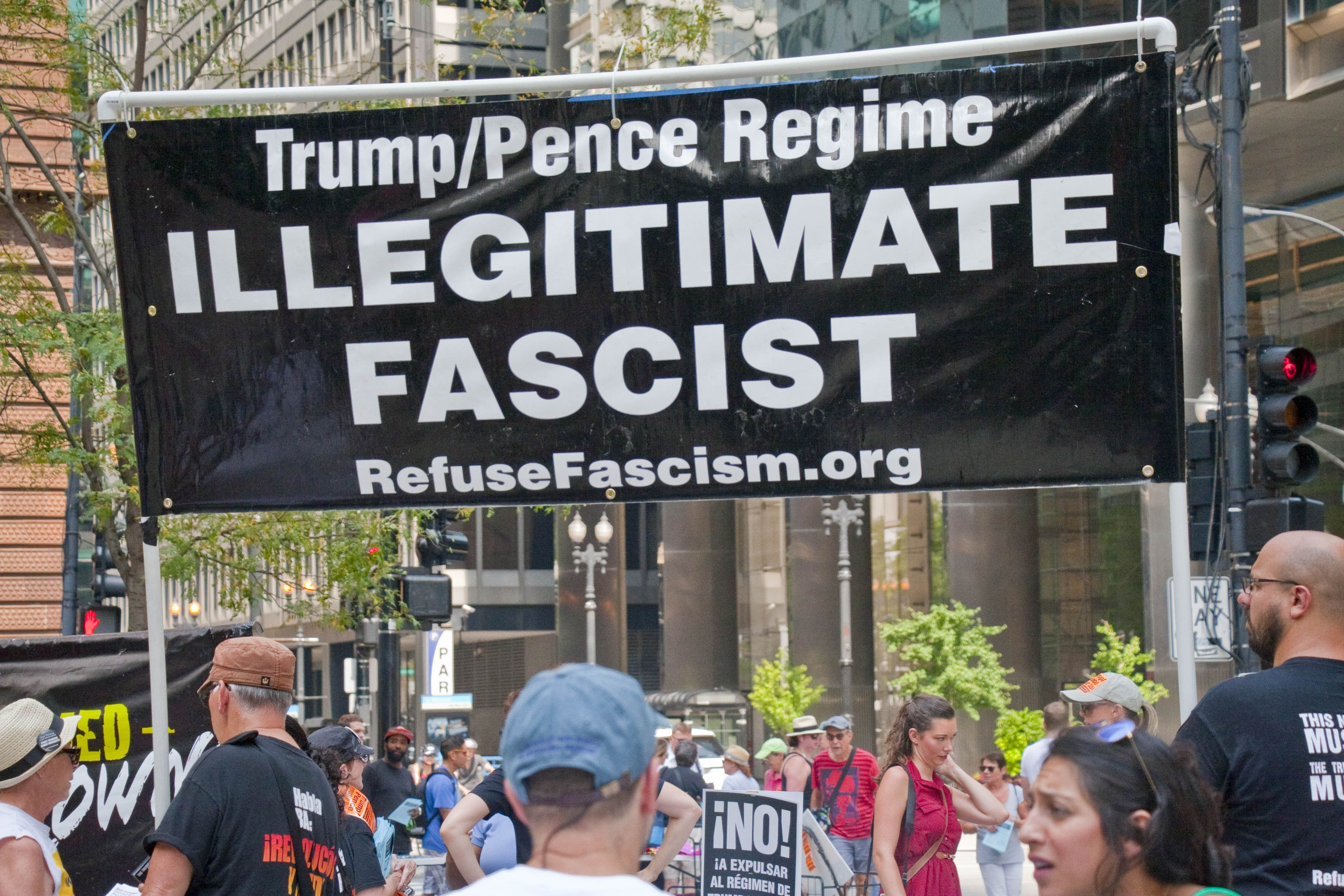
A protest sign at a 2018 rally describing Trump as a fascist

=== Invocations before the January 6, 2021 Capitol attack ===
Trump was described as a fascist by philosophers such as Judith Butler and Noam Chomsky. In 2017, Holocaust historian Timothy Snyder published On Tyranny, warning about the danger signs of fascism in the Trump era. Political theorist William E. Connolly analyzed Trump's rhetorical appeal to the working class, exploring its affinities with fascist rhetoric. In her 2018 book Fascism: A Warning, former US Secretary of State and then Professor in the Practice of Diplomacy at Georgetown University's School of Foreign Service Madeleine Albright referenced Donald Trump several times; she refused to directly define Trump as a fascist while comparing his rhetoric and methods with fascist leaders and characterizing him as the first modern antidemocratic U.S. president. In 2018, American-Canadian cultural critic Henry Giroux wrote an essay linking the subjects of fascism, right-wing populism, Trump, white nationalism, education, and politics. In 2016, Ewan McGaughey in the British Journal of American Legal Studies suggested that Trump's movement was weaker than previous fascists as it was "too hostile to insider welfare" and instead highlighted the Supreme Court's decisions in Citizens United and Buckley v. Valeo as an assault on democracy and human rights, starting a long-term trend towards fascism. McGaughey stated the Court's decisions enabled the election of Trump but that Trump's politics should properly be characterized as "fascism-lite." In How Fascism Works (2018), Jason Stanley wrote that Trump employed "fascist techniques to excite his base and erode liberal democratic institutions."

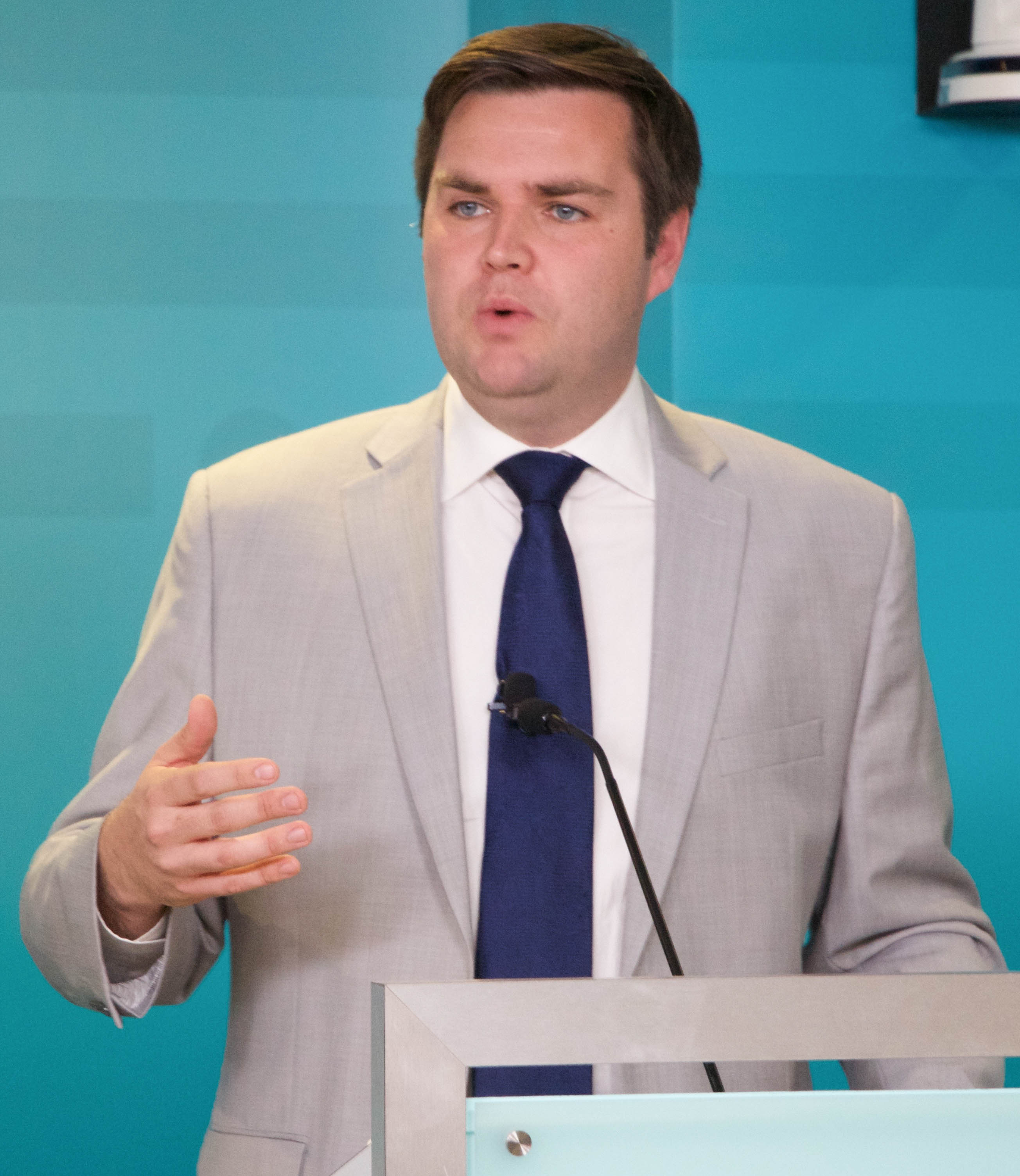
In 2016, JD Vance said that, "I go back and forth between thinking Trump is a cynical asshole like Nixon... or that he's America's Hitler."

After Trump called for a Muslim travel ban in late 2015, he was described as a fascist by some Democratic and Republican figures, including conservative activists Max Boot; Robert Kagan; Bret Stephens; John Noonan; former Virginia governor Jim Gilmore; and libertarian politician Gary Johnson. Republican former governor Christine Todd Whitman referred to Trump's 2015 calls for the travel ban as "the kind of rhetoric that allowed Hitler to move forward." Conservative commentator Glenn Beck compared Trump with Hitler in 2016, calling him "dangerous" and stating that "We all look at Adolf Hitler in 1940. We should look at Adolf Hitler in 1929... He was a kind of a funny kind of a character who said the things that people are thinking... Where Donald Trump takes it, I have absolutely no idea." Former Republican governor of Virginia Jim Gilmore said that Trump's plans of creating a "deportation force" were "fascist talk." JD Vance said in 2016 that he saw Trump as either a politician like Richard Nixon or "America's Hitler," also calling him "reprehensible." Despite this, he went on to run alongside Trump in his 2024 presidential campaign. Fascism scholar Federico Finchelstein said about Trump that "fascism sometimes becomes an attribute to describe someone that is intolerant or totalitarian or even racist... When dealing with an important part of the nation such as Hispanics, I think he definitely fits those categories."

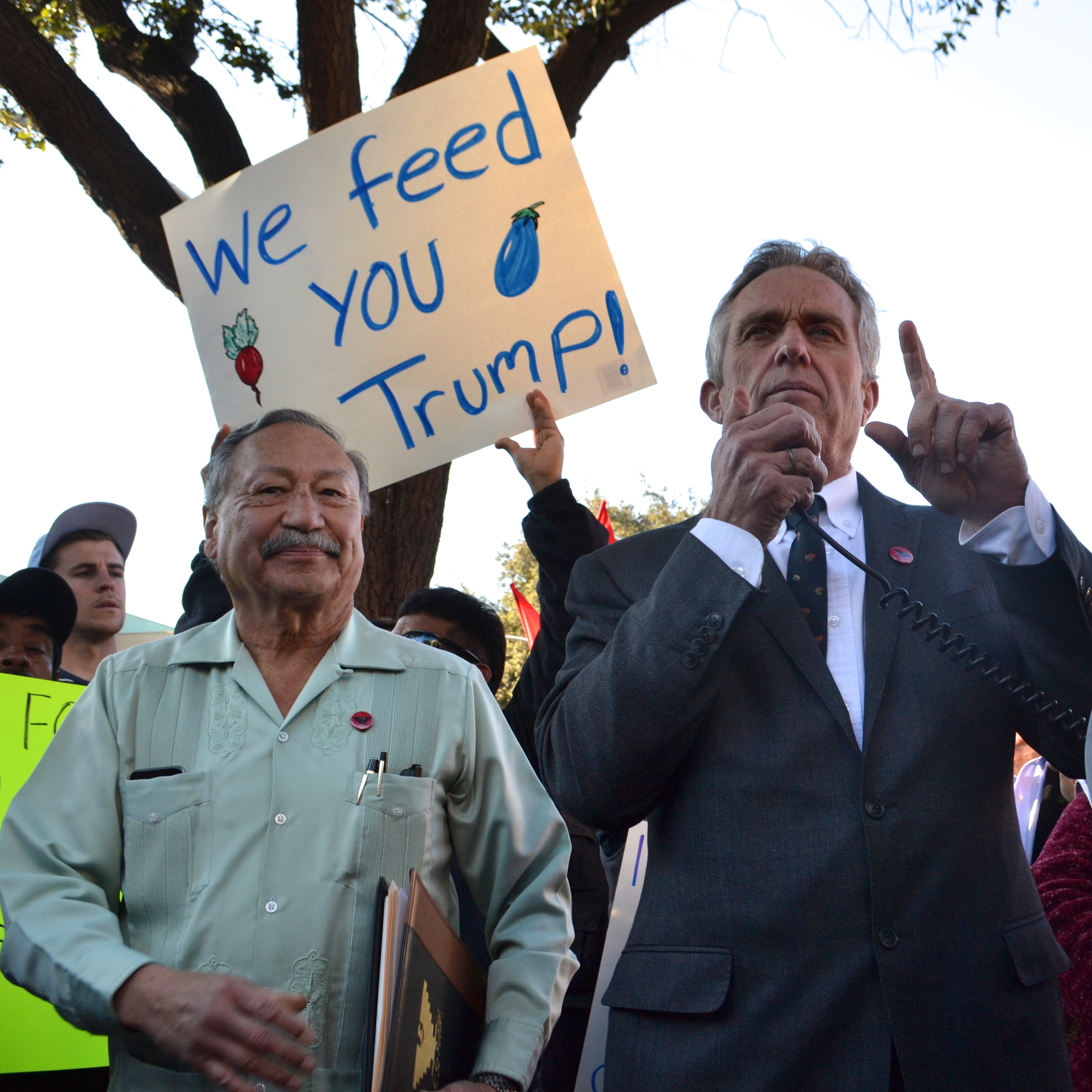
Robert F. Kennedy Jr. has previously compared Trump to Adolf Hitler, Benito Mussolini, and Charles Coughlin.

American politician Robert F. Kennedy Jr. has compared Trump to both Hitler and Mussolini, described him as a "threat to democracy" in April 2024, and endorsed the suggestion that some of Trump's base supporters were "outright Nazis." He said in December 2016 that Trump was different from Hitler in at least one way, that being that "Hitler was interested in policy." Kennedy has also compared Trump to Father Coughlin, an American an Nazi sympathizer and radio host from the 1930s. In 2024, Kennedy endorsed Trump for president, who then nominated him for Secretary of Health and Human Services.

Anne Frank's stepsister Eva Schloss said in 2016 that Trump was "acting like another Hitler". In 2020, American journalist Rich Benjamin stated that Trump's political movement is "shot through with fascism." Professor Nicholas de Genova described Trump as the leader of a "white supremacist fascist movement" and examined Trump's birtherism, racist rhetoric, voter fraud falsehoods, anti-immigration policies, and terrorist and white supremacist events that happened during his presidency, plus Republican capitulation to Trumpism, signaling the whole as the birth of a civil war ethos in which "everything is permitted."

=== Invocations after the January 6, 2021 Capitol attack ===
Following the January 6 Capitol attack, Robert Paxton, an expert on WWII-era fascism who had initially resisted calling Trump a fascist, announced that the label now seemed necessary. Mattias Gardell argued that Trump's MAGA campaign centered fascist visions of a national rebirth and that Hitler and Mussolini were also dismissed as "egomaniacs, big-mouths, and buffoons" by commentators at the time. David Renton has said that figures such as Hitler, Mussolini, and Mosley became fascists over time and that January 6 served as a warning to America about how vulnerable it is to authoritarianism. Maria Bucur has argued that the "surfacing of fascist sympathies" was facilitated by Trump. Brian Hughes has called for further study of Trumpism and Trump's fascist merits through Lacanian terms, arguing that Trump "not only meets the criteria of charismatic strongman" but "he exceeds them."

Ruth Wodak has said that while Trump's rhetoric applies "salient discursive practices of fascism," it is not useful to lose oneself in "terminological debates" and instead encouraged greater study on Trumpism's socio-political, historical, and situative contexts, along with the ideological positions of his close advisors such as Steve Bannon. Raul Cârstocea argues that Trump has "adopted fascist ideological or stylistic trappings without embracing fascism's revolutionary impetus" and that whether or not Trump is a fascist is less relevant, as "Trump did radicalize the Republican Party considerably, and he did mobilize actual fascists to seek a violent overthrow of the establishment" and that Trump may or may not represent a "2.0 version of analogue fascism for our digital post-fascist present."

In Gavriel D. Rosenfeld's book Fascism in America, published after the January 6 attacks, Ruth Ben-Ghiat stated that "Trump can be called a fascist because he differed from any previous American president in having the explicit goal of destroying democracy at home, disengaging America from democratic international networks, and allying with the autocrats he admires, like Putin." Ben-Ghiat further stated that she "started writing about Trump in 2015 because everything about him seemed familiar to me as someone who had studied fascism for decades: the rallies, the attacks on the press, the lying, the loyalty oaths, the declarations of violent intent, and the need to dominate and humiliate."

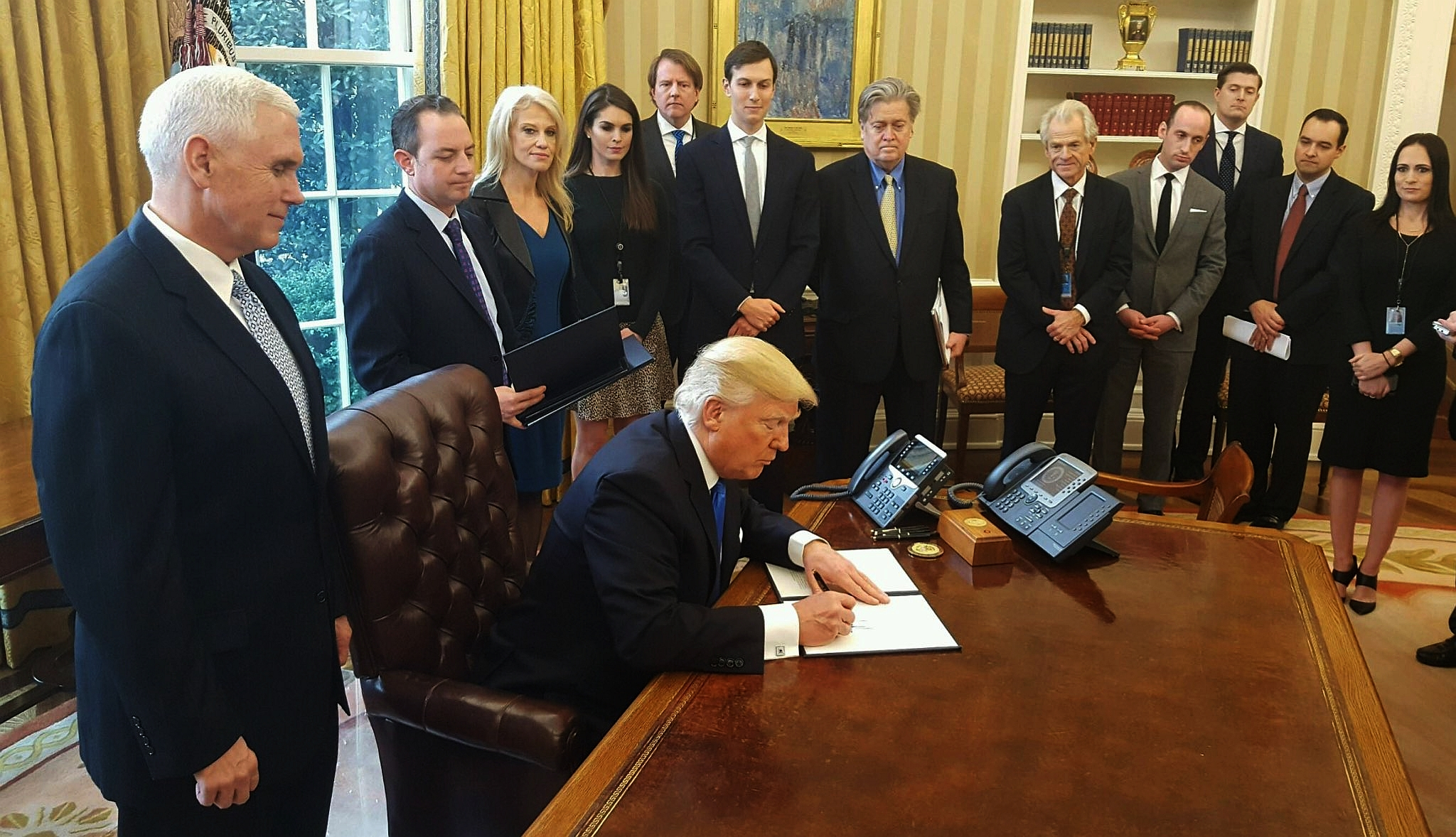
Trump's former advisor Steve Bannon (center-right, blue shirt) said that he thought "that's Hitler" when he saw Trump descend from the Trump Tower elevator in 2015.

In Jeremy W. Peters's 2022 book Insurgency, former Trump staffer Steve Bannon was repeatedly quoted comparing Trump to Hitler. Bannon said that Trump's aides showing him misleading polling data during the 2020 election was "like showing Hitler fake armor divisions when the Reichstag is burning down." According to the book, Bannon said that the sight of Trump descending from an elevator in New York made a Triumph of the Will scene in which Hitler exits his aircraft to an adoring crowd "flash" through his mind. According to the book, Bannon told Peters that he thought "that's Hitler," meaning it as a compliment to Trump.

Trump and Hitler: A Comparative Study in Lying: Author Henk de Berg said that there are "massive differences" between Trump and Hitler but also that both politicians shared similar rhetorical patterns. He stated that "most of their electorate are dissatisfied with the status quo for a variety of reasons (globalization, automation), so they want to change the system, and here you have an anti-establishment candidate who is not politically correct."

Mike Godwin, the creator of Godwin's Law, stated in 2023 that "Trump's opening himself up to the Hitler comparison." He also said that, "You could say the 'vermin' remark or the 'poisoning the blood' remark, maybe one of them would be a coincidence. But both of them pretty much make it clear that there's something thematic going on, and I can't believe it's accidental."

=== Invocations during the 2024 presidential campaign ===
Comparisons between Trump and fascism drawn by mainstream media increased substantially in 2023 and 2024, and during his 2024 presidential campaign, a growing number of scholars, historians, commentators, politicians, former Trump officials, and generals described Trump as a fascist.

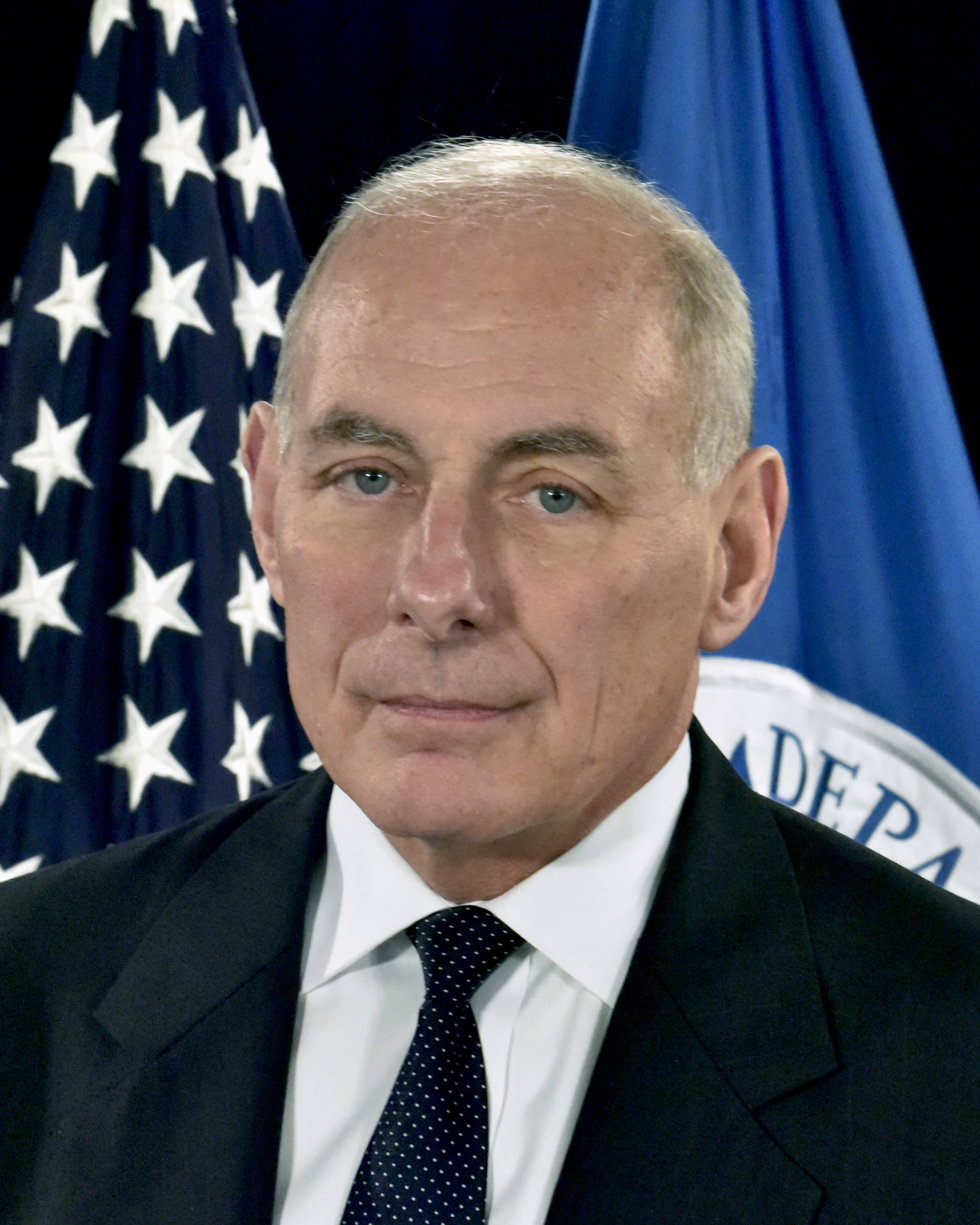
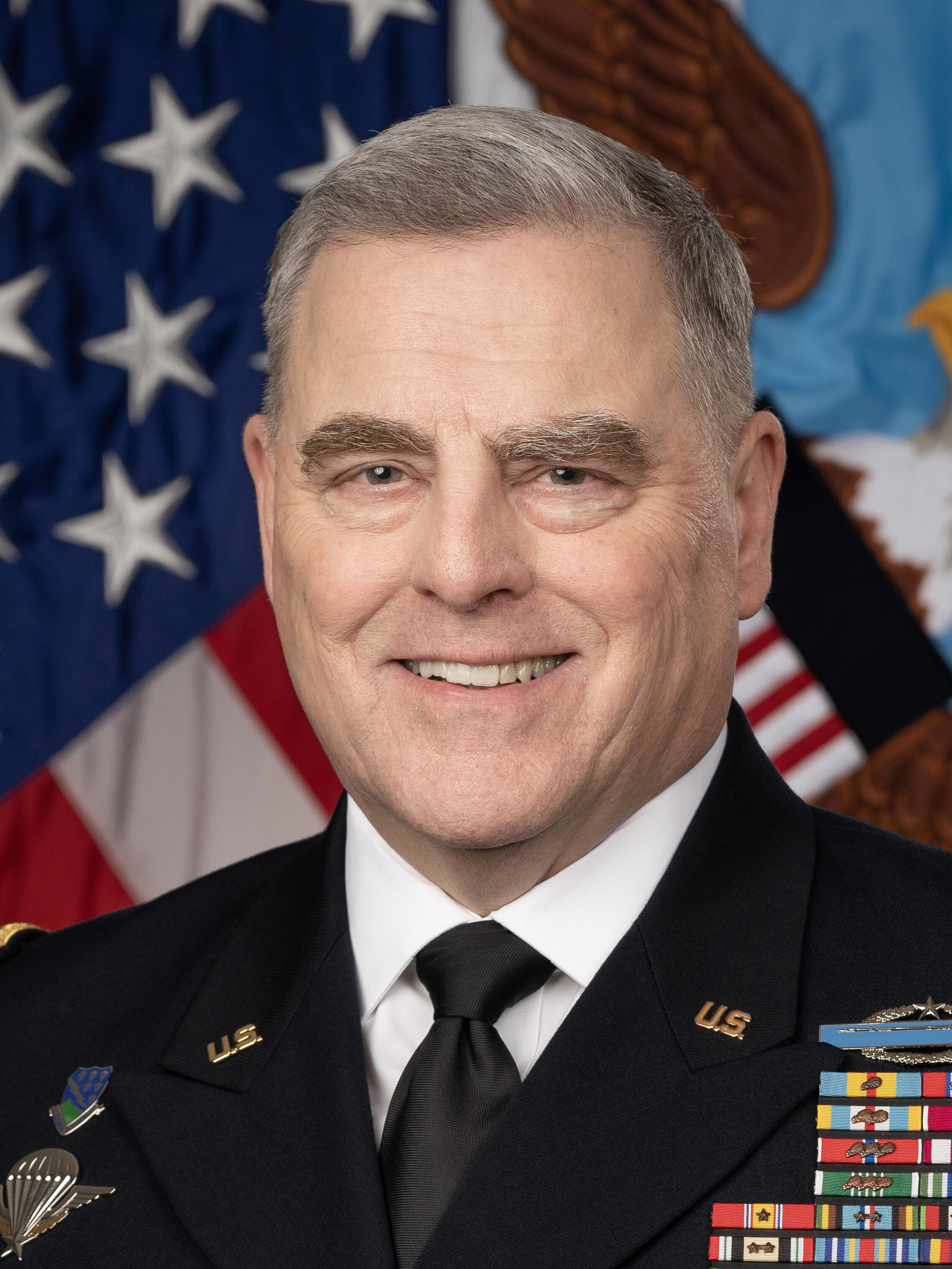
Former senior Trump administration officials John F. Kelly (left) and Mark Milley (right) have both described Trump as a fascist.

Voice of America coverage of comparisons drawn between Trump and fascism by former Trump staff

Trump was described as a fascist in October 2024 by John F. Kelly, Trump's former chief of staff during his presidential tenure. Referring to the definition of fascism as a far-right authoritarian ideology with elements of ultranationalism and a dictatorial leader, Kelly stated that Trump "certainly" meets the definition of a fascist, making it the first time a president has been called a fascist by a former hand-picked top adviser. Following the statements by Kelly, Karine Jean-Pierre stated that United States President Joe Biden agreed with the assertion that Trump is a fascist. Kamala Harris, Biden's vice president and Trump's opponent in the 2024 election, also stated that she considers Trump to be a fascist. Thirteen former Trump officials signed an open letter agreeing with Kelly's statements. Mark Esper, Secretary of Defense under Trump, also agreed with Kelly, saying Trump meets the definition of a fascist and has fascist instincts.

Additionally, Mark Milley, the former Chairman of the Joint Chiefs of Staff, described Trump as "fascist to the core."

Cornel West has described Trump as a fascist. Professor and former Secretary of Labor Robert Reich has publicly described Trump as a fascist. The Economist said it was reasonable to describe Trump as a modern iteration of fascism. Howard French stated that Trump is a fascist but questioned whether the message would have helped Democrats to win the 2024 election. Peter Baker described Trump as the president who most aggressively discredited democracy at home while affiliating himself with autocrats abroad.

=== Invocations during Trump's second presidency ===
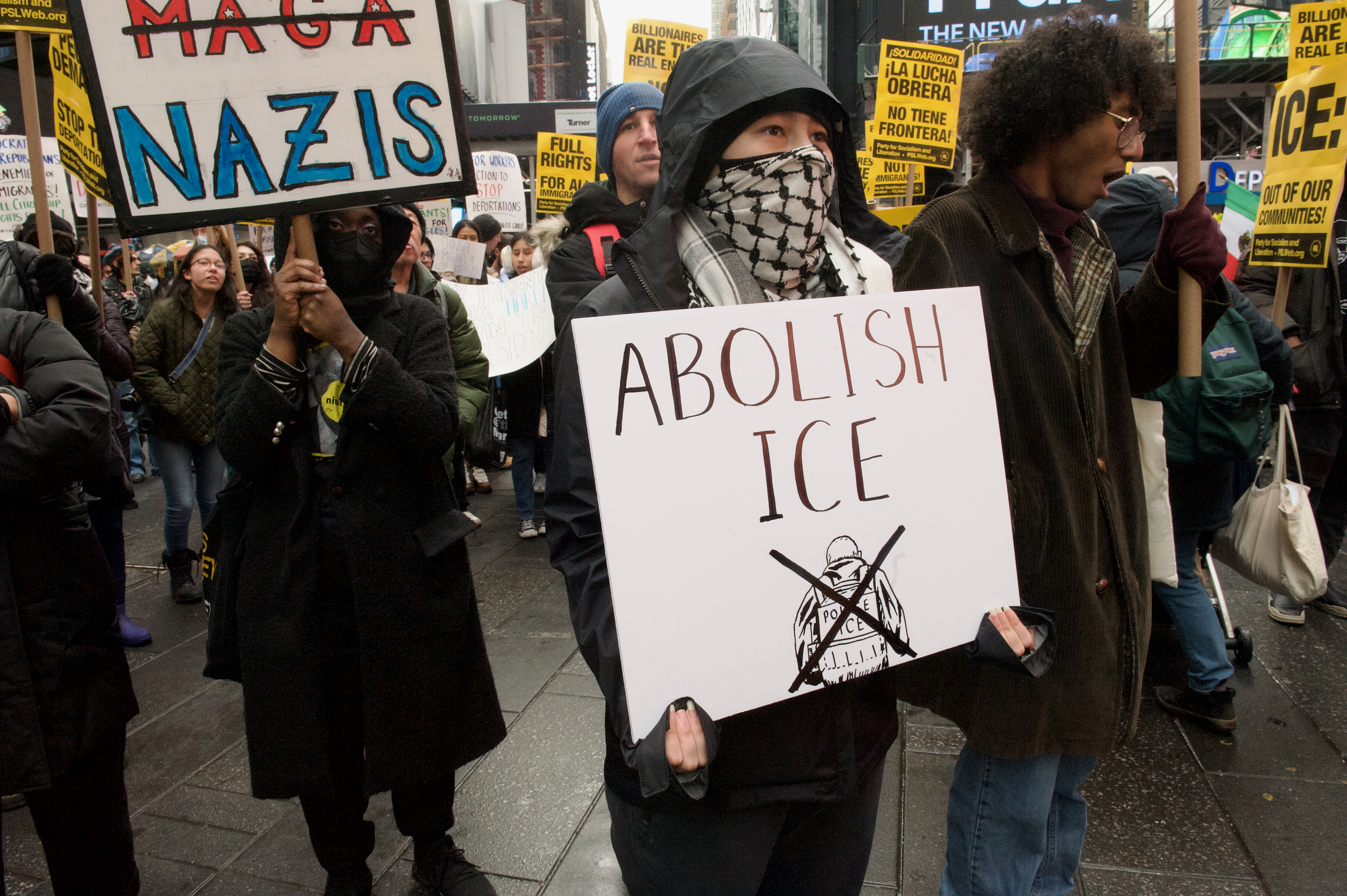
Anti-ICE protesters in New York City, with one holding a sign comparing the "Make America Great Again" (MAGA) movement with Nazis

==== By scholars ====
In March 2025, historian of Nazism Johann Chapoutot argued on the contrary that Trump's second presidency was comparable to fascism because of its shared irrationalism and disdain of social sciences, such as the censorship of words in the scientific field.

In March 2025, historian of the Holocaust Peter Hayes assessed similarly that the comparisons between Trump and fascism were "exaggerated, but also increasingly relevant" with an expansionist and ultranationalist thirst within Trump, who swears several times to annex Greenland; Hayes saw similarities with the concept of Lebensraum since the expansion of national territory is also seen as vital. However, historian of the Holocaust Christopher Browning rejected Hayes's analysis since Trump's expansionism is more similar to an American expansionist worldview of the 19th century.

In March 2025, historians of Nazism and of nationalism Johann Chapoutot and John Connelly linked Trump to fascism, seeing parallels between Trump's relations with Vladimir Putin concerning the Russo-Ukrainian war and the Munich Agreement, where Adolf Hitler annexed the Sudetenland with the French and English approvals.

In March 2025, political experts Lloyd Cox and Brendon O'Connor asserted Trump's and fascists' economic policies were too distinct and important to depict Trump as a fascist since the former respects, imperfectly, neoliberal norms. However, since Trump showed evident "dictatorial tendencies," Trump would rather be a "proto-fascist phenomenon."

In March 2025, historians of Nazism and fascism Anne Berg and Paul Lerner explained democracy was in great danger because of the censorship of scholars and of the media. Christopher Browning denied those assessments, explaining that the USA had strong enough guardrails, unlike Europe's interwar period. Nonetheless, Browning gave in that the country could well become an illiberal democracy by the end of Trump's term.

In March-April 2025, Timothy Snyder, Marci Shore, and Jason Stanley, three experts on fascism from Yale University, fled from the United States to Canada. They cited what they perceived to be America's descent into a fascist dictatorship as their reason for leaving the country. Additionally, an April 2025 survey of over 500 political scientists found that the majority considered the United States under Trump to be quickly becoming an authoritarian regime. In May 2025, Jason Stanley stated that Trump's frequent attempts to target institutions of higher education such as Harvard University were due to them being a "threat to the glory of the dictator" and that "all dictators smash universities."

In June 2025, the day of the United States Army 250th Anniversary Parade, more than 400 scholars, including 31 Nobel laureates from more than 30 countries, signed an open letter labeled "A Renewed Open Letter Against the Return of Fascism," which is a renewal of the 1925 Italian Manifesto of the Anti-Fascist Intellectuals.

In September 2025, historians Diana Garvin, Tiffany Florvil, and Claudia Koonz argued Donald Trump's government was weaponizing and objectifying women similarly to previous fascist regimes. They explained that like fascist Italy and Nazi Germany, Trump pushes pronatalist policies mixed with white supremacism, normalizes the idea of the woman's body being "state resources," and relies on women's serfdom to bash themselves and other women.

In September 2025, historian Ben Worthy depicted Trump as a fascist, explaining that he checked every characteristic of a fascist leader: "After more than six months in office, [he] already has the full apparatus of fascism: concentration camps, a secret police, a loyal elite, and a weakened opposition."

In October 2025, political scientist Asma Mhalla argues Trump's second administration is fascist since the state wants to enhance its power in order to achieve the rank of a Hobbesian Leviathan by "accelerat[ing] authoritarianism." Nonetheless, she expresses differences with original fascism because of alliances with tech moguls, massive use of social media, and proximity to neoreactionary accelerationism, partly in order to curb China's growing clout.

In January 2026, political scientist Bourgeois denied the comparisons between Trump and fascism since he puts forward an "anti-statist neoliberalism," is isolationist rather than expansionist, and doesn't use any paramilitary militia. Nevertheless, he decried his regime as authoritarian, nationalist, and adorned with a cult of personality.

==== By politicians and other political figures ====
In a United States Senate hearing in March 2025, Bernie Sanders presented a graphic created by Trump's 2024 campaign and compared it to a piece of Hungarian fascist propaganda. Both images depicted Jews controlling political leaders as puppets on strings. Three expert witnesses on the subject of antisemitism agreed that Trump's publication was antisemitic propaganda similar to the fascist example. Larry Diamond argued in March 2025 that Trump had some but not yet all of the characteristics of a fascist leader. Matthew Kriner, a scholar of far-right extremism, argues that the Elon Musk salute controversy was far from the only instance of fascist imagery appearing from supporters of Donald Trump while noting how many of the examples of veiled fascism have plausible deniability. In May 2026, during the Delaney Hall hunger strike and protests, Border Patrol officer Gregory Bovino posted on X expressing support for the ICE agents at Delaney Hall, saying, "Give them hell," and attaching an image of himself making a gesture described by news editor Charles R. Davis as a Nazi salute.

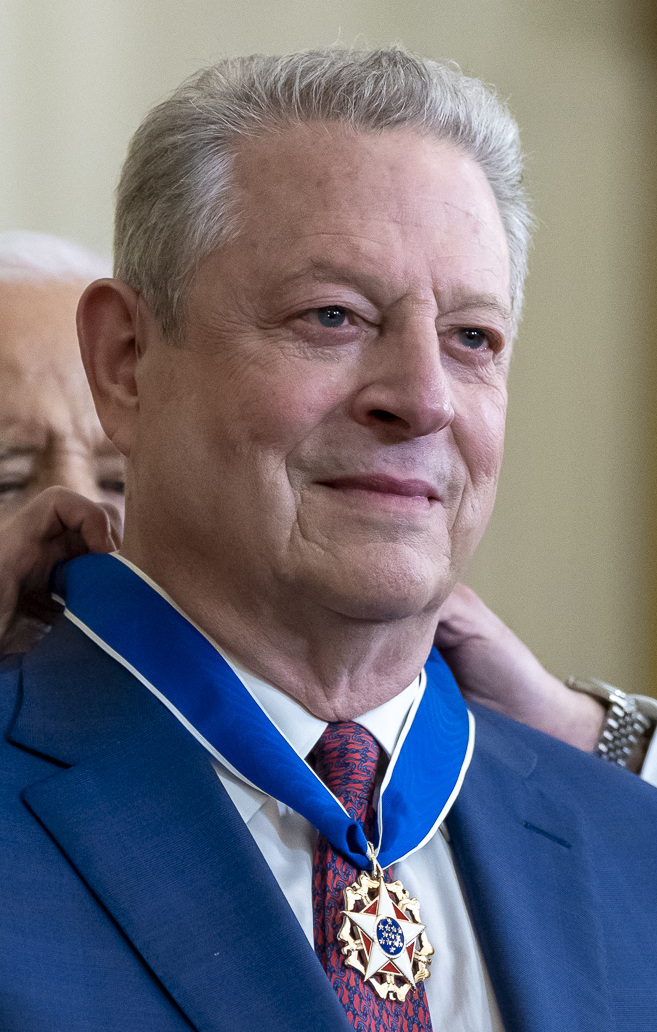
Former U.S. Vice President Al Gore compared Trump to Adolf Hitler in an April 2025 speech.

In an April 2025 speech, former United States Vice President Al Gore directly compared Trump to Adolf Hitler, drawing comparisons between Trump's political actions and those of the Nazi regime. He quoted antifascist philosopher Theodor W. Adorno describing the use of misinformation by the Nazi regime to convert "all questions of truth into questions of power", saying that Trump uses the same tactic. Adrienne LaFrance cited scholars who see Trump's second term as textbook fascism.

Following the assault and forceful removal of Senator Alex Padilla from a press conference in June 2025 after he attempted to ask a question, several United States senators described the event as fascistic. Elizabeth Warren stated that "it's looking more and more like a fascist state out there every day", and Scott Wiener stated that "anyone who continues to doubt whether this is fascism is living in an alternate reality." Additionally, journalist Jim Acosta said that "what happened to Senator Padilla is not homeland security. That's homeland fascism."

In July 2025, Joe Rogan, who had endorsed Trump during his 2024 campaign, expressed regret for the endorsement, saying that Trump's policies during his second presidency resembled fascism.

== Criticism of the comparison ==
=== From academics ===
In response to multiple authors claiming that the then-presidential candidate Donald Trump was a fascist, a 2016 article for Vox cited five historians who study fascism, including historian of Nazism Roger Griffin, author of The Nature of Fascism, who stated that Trump either does not hold or is even opposed to several political viewpoints that are integral to fascism, including viewing violence as an inherent good and an inherent rejection of or opposition to a democratic system. In 2020, Vox contacted a group of experts on fascism for their view, with most rejecting the comparison but expressing concern about Trump's authoritarian and violent tendencies, including historians Roger Griffin and Stanley Payne. In February 2025, Roger Griffin argued Trump had not shown any sign of intending to implement something similar to the Nazi Enabling Act of 1933 to put an end to American democracy, preferring to rule by charisma rather than by executive orders. Therefore, he considers Trump to be a radical right-wing populist and not a fascist. Historian Richard J. Evans also rejected comparisons to fascism. In 2018, he wrote a negative review of both Albright's and Snyder's books as having a "vague and confused" view of what defines fascism. A paper in International Critical Thought stated in 2017 that the Trump administration was not hegemonic nor fascist but that it signaled the rise of a right-wing nationalist movement. Benjamin R. Teitelbaum has stated he "unequivocally reject[s] using the term" 'fascist' to describe Trump on epistemological and pedagogical grounds," viewing it as "an end of inquiry. Roger Griffin also argued that Trump displayed some but not all traits of fascism and that his actions on January 6 were not those of a fascist leader but of an "ochlocrat."

In a 2024 Guardian column, Jan Werner-Müller argued that rejecting the label can be done while acknowledging the dangers to democracy Trump creates. Geoff Boucher, writing for The Conversation in 2024, argues Trump represents instead a 'new authoritarianism' that relies on administration instead of paramilitaries to subvert democracy, a definition seconded by The Herald. Daniel Steinmetz-Jenkins, a historian at Wesleyan University, in an interview with historian Joshua Zeitz, stated that while he thought Trump had an authoritarian and illiberal vision, he was unsure if Trump was a fascist, but that "not framing him this way does not at all mean that he is not a threat." Griffin has since caveated this with the following statement: "In standard academic terms, he (Trump) is not one (a fascist); he is something worse." In Brazilian Portuguese, the term biliocracia ('rule by billionaires') was used to describe his administration and ideology.

Many articles have been written in an attempt to name precisely what Trump's ideology is, either to specify what type of fascist he is or to claim he is something else instead. He has been called a hypercapitalist, petty tyrant, new authoritarian, far-right populist, Machiavellian, authoritarian populist, mercantilist, deep nationalist and a Trumpist.

=== From politicians ===
Following the attempted assassination of Donald Trump in Pennsylvania, some Republicans, including JD Vance, Stephen Miller, and Robert F. Kennedy Jr. argued that comparing Trump to a fascist or a Nazi could incite violence. Susan Benesch, founding director of the Dangerous Speech Project, has called such comparisons "a pot calling the kettle black" and noted that Trump's continued use of inflammatory rhetoric against Democrats has not stopped. In response to John F. Kelly and Mark Milley calling Trump a fascist, Vance dismissed their claims and characterized them both as "disgruntled former employees."

John Fetterman, a Democratic senator representing Pennsylvania, criticized the usage of the term "fascist" by his own party, arguing that it didn't reflect any political reality while alienating Republican constituents from them.

== Historiography ==
Political experts Lloyd Cox and Brendon O'Connor argued the battle between historians using or refuting the term "fascist" for Trump stemmed from a "binary" divergence of the historiography of fascism: whereas the "skeptical" historians defined fascism solely on a historic level confined in the inter-war era, the "alarmist" historians depicted fascism by intemporal ideological characteristics.

Historian Ben Worthy explained the limited scientific and journalistic literature explicitly linking Trump to fascism could be explained by denialism and the refusal to acknowledge that a fascist was at the head of the "land of the free."

== In pop culture ==
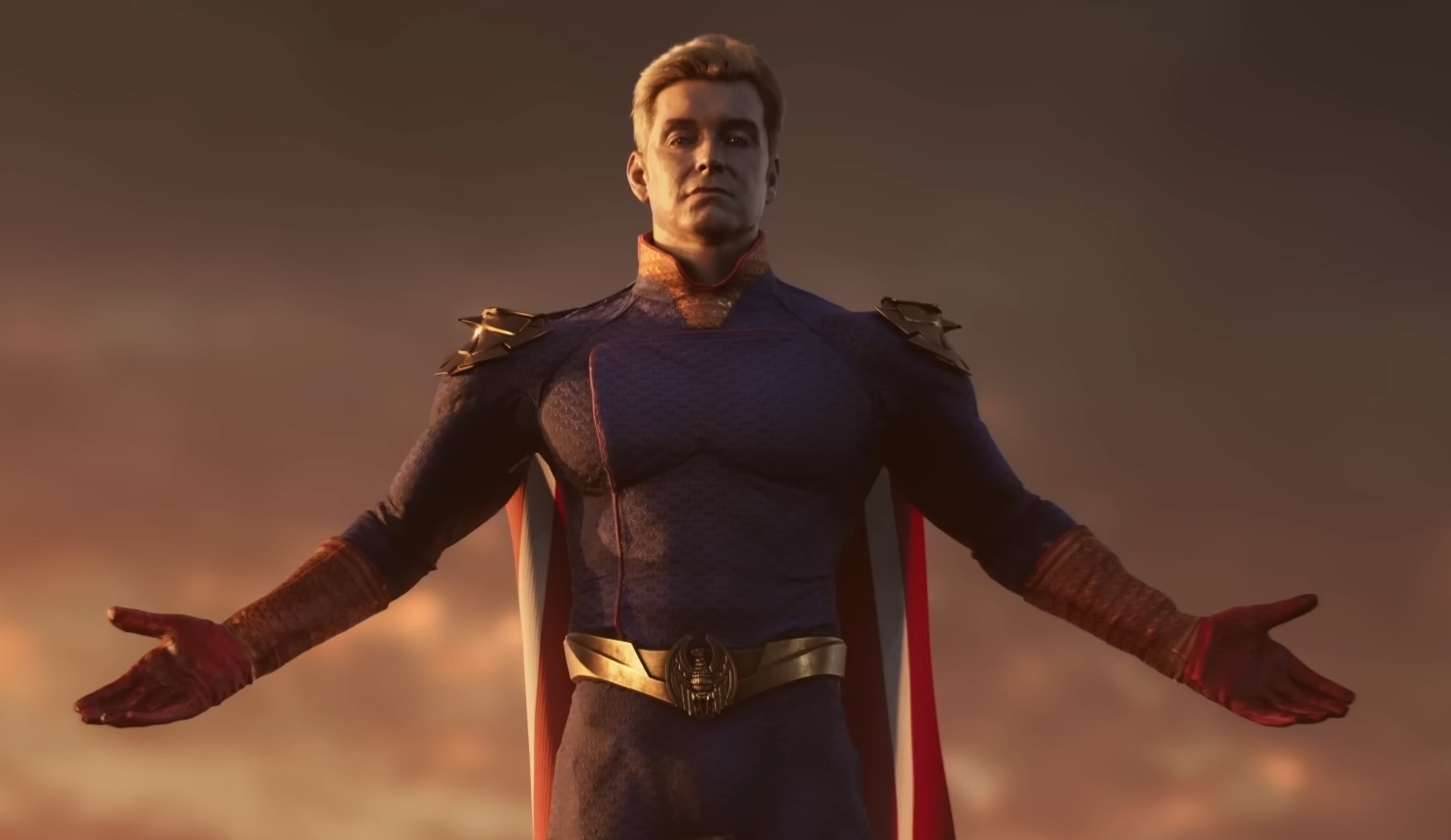
Homelander, the main antagonist from the TV show The Boys, who becomes a fascist dictator across the series.

In 2017 during the first presidency of Donald Trump, an advertisement for the video game Wolfenstein II: The New Colossus draws a parallel between Trump and Nazism, by transforming the MAGA slogan into "Make America Nazi Free Again."

In the TV show The Boys, broadcast from 2019 to 2026, the main antagonist, Homelander, who increasingly becomes a fascist megalomaniac dictator ruling over the US, is an analogy of Donald Trump and his presidency.

== See also ==
- Democratic backsliding in the United States
- Targeting of political opponents and civil society under the second Trump administration
- NSPM-7, a National Security Presidential Memorandum (NSPM) issued by Trump in 2025
- Donald Trump and antisemitism
- Trump derangement syndrome, a pejorative term used to describe negative reactions to Donald Trump
- Para-fascism
