= Fascism: A Warning =

2018 book by Madeleine Albright

- First edition
- Author: Madeleine Albright
- Publisher: HarperCollins
- Publication place: United States
- Pages: 304
- ISBN: 9780062802187
- OCLC: 1038579147

Fascism: A Warning is a 2018 book about fascism by Madeleine Albright, published by HarperCollins.

== Synopsis ==
Albright raises concerns about a decline of liberal democracy, in reflections based on her early life in Czechoslovakia and career as a diplomat and academic. Speaking with Vox in 2019, Albright explained: "...fascism is not an ideology; it's a process for taking and holding power." The root causes Albright identifies as creating the condition for the rise of fascist leaders include economic decline, social disorder, and disjointed opposition.

Leaders that Albright analyzes in the book cover the years from the 1920s to the 2010s, and include Hugo Chávez, Recep Tayyip Erdoğan, Benito Mussolini, and Donald Trump.

== Critical reception ==
For The New York Times, Columbia University political science professor Sheri Berman praised Fascism: A Warning: "Democracy's problems can, Albright assures us, be overcome—but only if we recognize history's lessons and never take democracy for granted."

JP O'Malley of the Irish Independent commented: "Much of the early chapters are standard history lessons, but the book is at its most compelling when Albright casually recollects personal details of diplomatic missions." However, The Washington Post opinion editor Christian Caryl was more critical. Regarding later chapters where Albright recounted encounters with Hugo Chávez and Vladimir Putin, Caryl responds: "Rather oddly, given the title of her book, she admits that none of these contemporary politicians really qualify as fascists. She's merely using them—and a long chapter at the end, about the worrisome behavior of the current U.S. president—to show what can happen to power-hungry leaders who run roughshod over checks and balances."

Richard J. Evans, history professor at the University of Cambridge, questioned the book's premise. Writing for The Guardian, Evans noted: "...Albright doesn't really know what fascism is. Lumping together post-Stalinist dictators such as Kim Jong-un and Nicolás Maduro with rightwing nationalists such as Orbán and Vladimir Putin is not much help in understanding either the forces that brought them to power or the policies they are implementing. Albright seems to identify fascism simply with a hostility to democracy and a propensity to lie."
