= Asma Mhalla =

French author

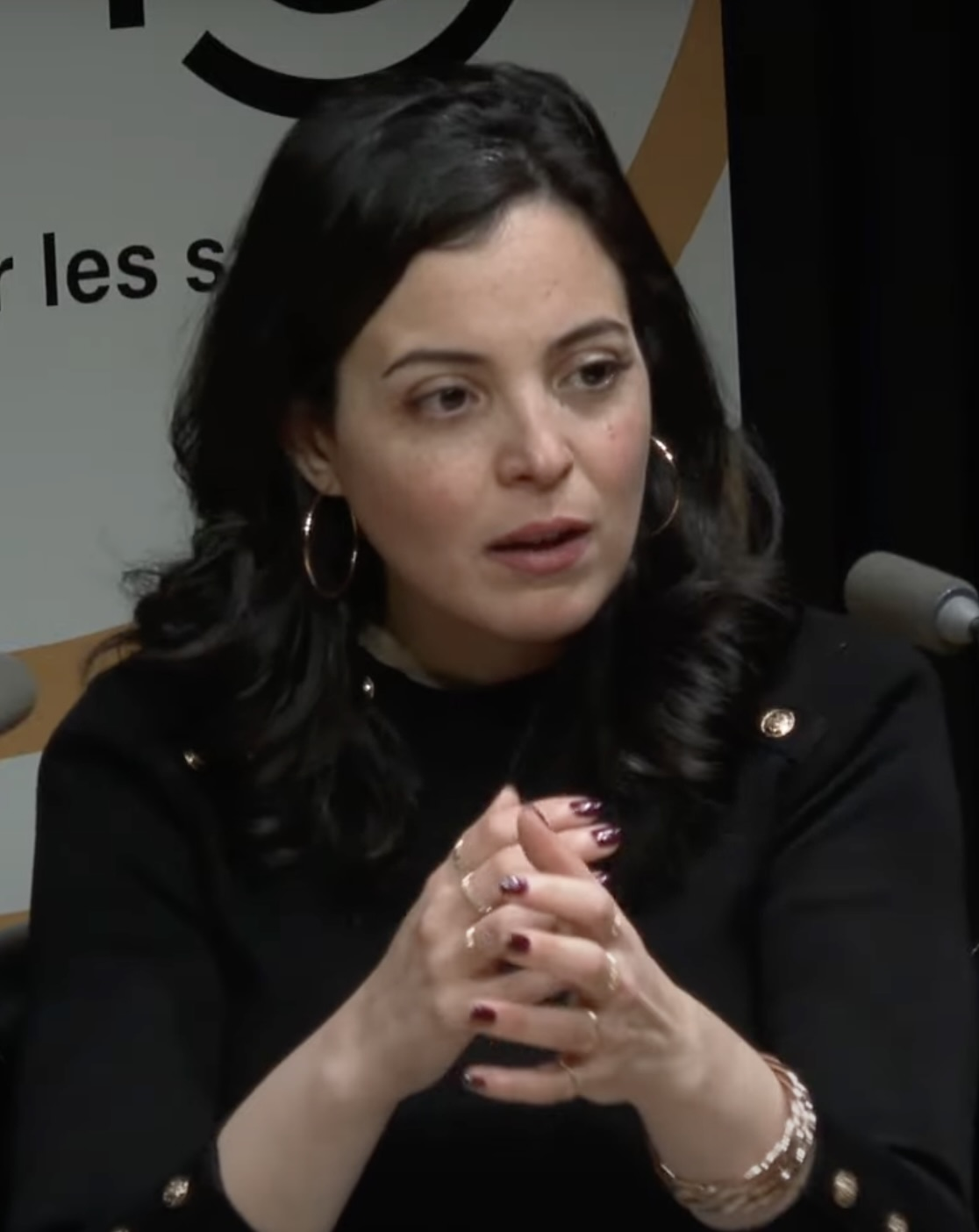
- Born: Tunis, Tunisia
- Education: ESCP Business School
- Occupations: political scientist, author

Asma Mhalla is a French-Tunisian political scientist. She is an associate researcher with the Laboratory of political anthropology, a joint project of the CNRS and the EHESS. She is a lecturer at Sciences Po and École Polytechnique.

== Early life ==
Mhalla was born in Tunisia, the eldest of three siblings. Her mother was from a very poor background. Her father was a senior public official who transitioned into entrepreneurship, with mixed success. Her paternal grandfather Mohamed Mhalla (1904–1951) was Great Qadi (Minister of Justice) in the Protectorate of Tunisia. When Mhalla was 12, her parents divorced after her mother abruptly left the household. Thereafter Mhalla was raised by her father in relative isolation from the Tunisian society and with no access to digital screens. Her father encouraged her studying.

== Education and career ==
After graduating from the Lycée Pierre-Mendès-France in Tunis, she was awarded a scholarship to study in France at a classe prépa.

She was subsequently admitted to ESCP Business School, where she studied on a tight budget from more scholarships. Due to an administrative concern Mhalla found herself without a place to stay right before the start of her studies at ESCP. She had to sleep two nights on a public bench, an experience that galvanized her resolve. She did not take any interest in the business studies at ESCP. After graduation, Mhalla worked in investment banking at BNP Paribas, an experience that she praised for structuring her approach to work.

She left her job in investment banking in 2016 due to a stay in hospital and illness. During her covalence Mhalla took an interest in digital policy reading the work of Bernard Harcourt. Following a publication of her first essay on digital policy in the Huffington Post, Harcourt and Mhalla established a collaboration.

She did not feel discriminated against in her work in investment banking, rather she was valued for her intellect. However, in her academic work, Mhalla experienced strongly gendered attitudes and even racism.

== Digital policy and cybersecurity ==
Mhalla is a digital policy expert. Her writing deals with geopolitical challenges of our times, such as cybersecurity and disinformation. She was also called upon to comment on issues such as the political power of the Big Tech, mostly on social medias, generative AI and the personality of Elon Musk.

In 2024, Mhalla published in French the essay Technopolitique: comment la technologie fait de nous des soldats. Mhalla argued in her book that technology is structuring our relationship to democracy. Her book faced harsh criticism for a lack of investigation and "hyperbolic style" (overuse of "hyper", "big", "meta" etc. without any precise definition), without any consistency in economics, technology and international affairs [Dominique Boullier, "Technopolitique ou l’art de la pêche au gros - AOC media [archive]", April 17, 2024]. Among these critics, the reluctance to name specific persons or entities (companies, governments) in charge of this situation is emphasized, and contributes to create a too general discourse about "us" and "them" [ Irénée Régnauld, LVSL, ""Technopolitique" d'Asma Mhalla: la démocratie du "nous contre eux" [archive]", May 16, 2024].
