= Ruth Ben-Ghiat =

American historian

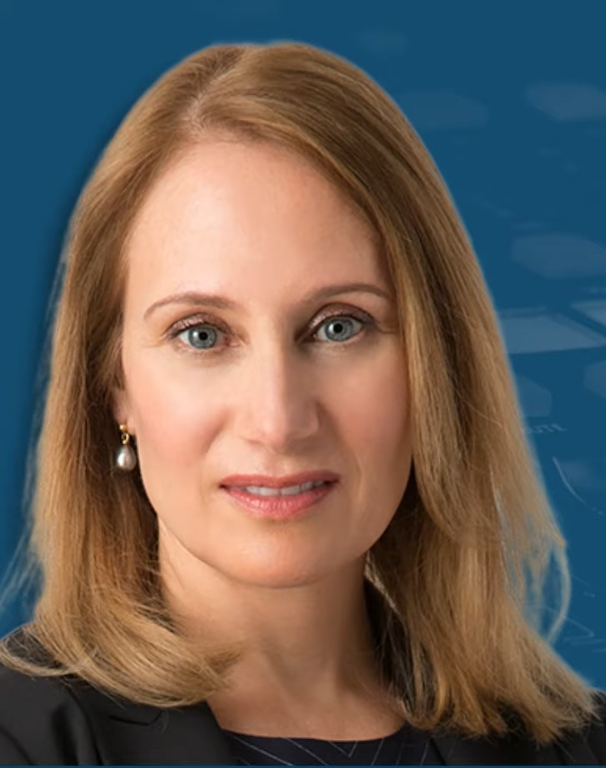
- Ben-Ghiat in 2019
- Born: April 17, 1960 (age 66); United States
- Occupations: Historian; academic
- Awards: Guggenheim Fellowship (2004)

Academic background
- Education: University of California, Los Angeles (BA); Brandeis University (PhD)
- Thesis: The formation of a Fascist culture: the Realist movement in Italy, 1930–43 (1991)

Academic work
- Discipline: Italian history; history of fascism
- Institutions: New York University
- Main interests: Culture of fascism; authoritarianism; propaganda
- Notable works: Strongmen: Mussolini to the Present
- Website: ruthbenghiat.com

Ruth Ben-Ghiat (born April 17, 1960) is an American history professor and political commentator. She is a scholar on fascism and authoritarian leaders. Ben-Ghiat is a professor of history and Italian studies at New York University.

== Biography ==
Born in the United States to a Scottish mother and an Israeli Sephardi Jewish father, she grew up in Pacific Palisades, California. She has a history degree from UCLA and obtained her Ph.D. in comparative history at Brandeis University. A member of the American Historical Association since 1990, she is a professor of history and Italian studies at New York University.

Ben-Ghiat was the Spring 2023 Dan and Maggie Inouye Distinguished Chair in Democratic Ideals at the University of Hawaiʻi at Mānoa.

She regularly writes for CNN, The Atlantic, and The Huffington Post. She is an advisor to Protect Democracy, an organization opposing attacks on U.S. democracy.

== Works ==
=== Books ===
- Ben-Ghiat, Ruth (2000). La cultura fascista (in Italian). Translated by Bassi, Maria Luisa. Bologna: Il Mulino.
- Ben-Ghiat, Ruth (2002). Fascist Modernities: Italy, 1922–1945. Berkeley, California: University of California Press.
- Ben-Ghiat, Ruth; Fuller, Mia, eds. (2005). Italian Colonialism. New York: Palgrave Macmillan. ISBN 9780230606364.
- Ben-Ghiat, Ruth; Hom, Stephanie Malia, eds. (2015). Italian Mobilities. London: Routledge. ISBN 9781138778146. OCLC 1061814583.
- Ben-Ghiat, Ruth (2015). Italian Fascism's Empire Cinema. Bloomington, Indiana: Indiana University Press.
- Ben-Ghiat, Ruth (2020). Strongmen: From Mussolini to the Present. New York: W. W. Norton & Company.

=== Journal articles ===
- Ben-Ghiat, Ruth (1997). "Language and the Construction of National Identity in Fascist Italy". The European Legacy. 2 (3): 438–443. doi:10.1080/10848779708579754.
- Ben-Ghiat, Ruth (2001). "The Secret Histories of Roberto Benigni's Life is Beautiful". The Yale Journal of Criticism. 14 (1): 253–266. doi:10.1353/yale.2001.0002. S2CID 161994102.
- Ben-Ghiat, Ruth (2005). "Unmaking the Fascist Man: Film, Masculinity, and the Transition from Dictatorship". Journal of Modern Italian Studies. 10 (3): 336–365. doi:10.1080/13545710500188361. S2CID 144449077.
- Ben-Ghiat, Ruth (2006). "Modernity is Just Over There: Colonialism and the Dilemmas of Italian National Identity". Interventions: International Journal of Postcolonial Studies. 8 (3): 380–393. doi:10.1080/13698010600955883. S2CID 144399136.
- Ben-Ghiat, Ruth (2015). "The Imperial Moment in Fascist Cinema". Journal of Modern European History. 13 (1): 59–78. doi:10.17104/1611-8944_2015_1_59. S2CID 147023860.
- Ben-Ghiat, Ruth (2017). "Realism in Transition, 1940–43". The Italianist. 37 (3): 407–415. doi:10.1080/02614340.2017.1409307. S2CID 149392001.

=== Ph.D. dissertation ===
- Ben-Ghiat, Ruth (1991). The formation of a Fascist culture: the Realist movement in Italy, 1930–43 (Thesis). Waltham, Massachusetts: Brandeis University. OCLC 35153484.
