= Johann Chapoutot =

French historian born 1978

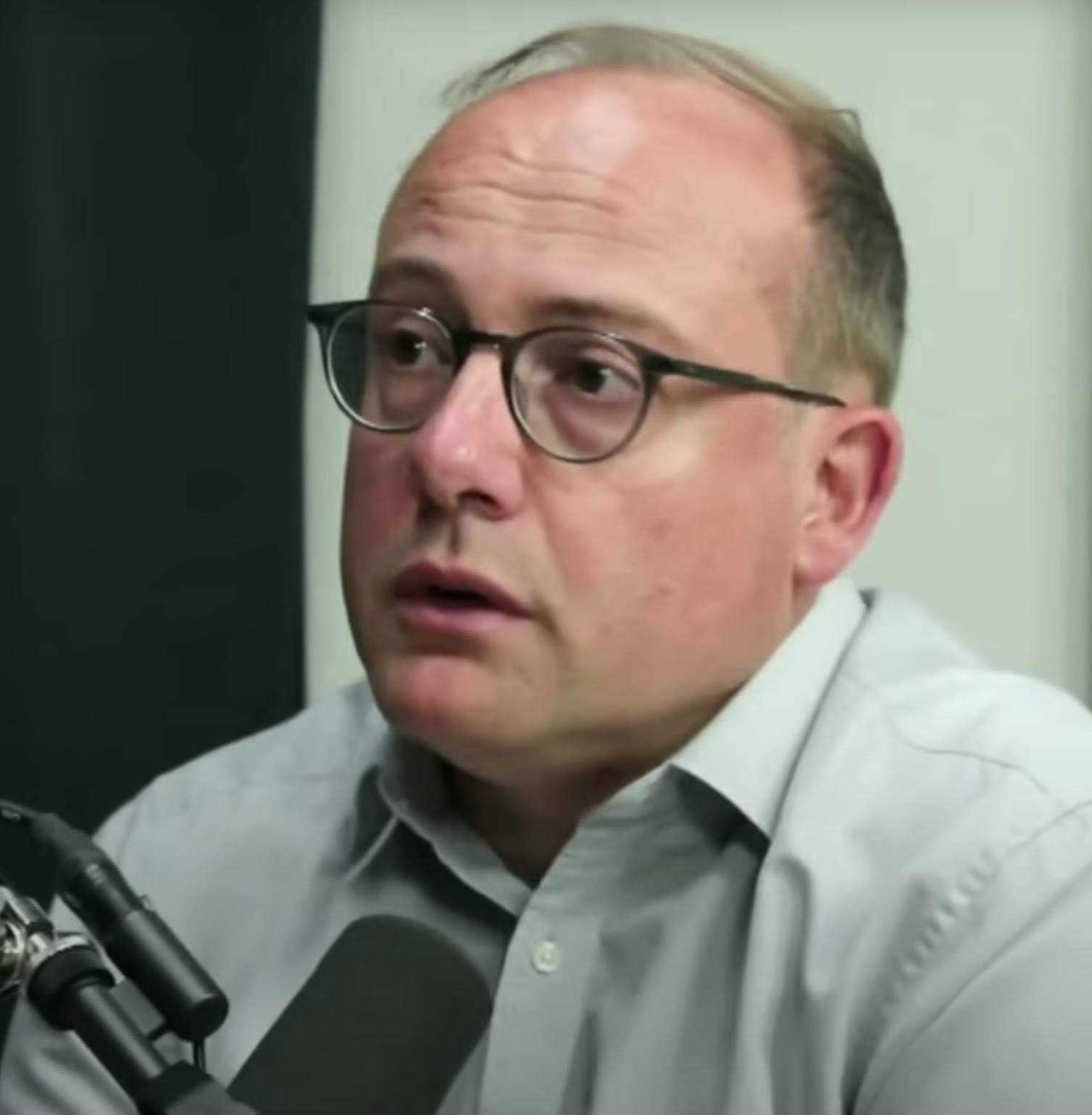
- Chapoutot in 2024

Academic work
- Discipline: Historian

Johann Chapoutot (born 30 July 1978) is a French historian, specializing in contemporary history, Germany, and Nazism.

== Early life ==
Johann Chapoutot was born in Martigues, France. In 1995, his eleventh grade history teacher enrolled him in the Concours Général in the history category, where the topic was "Were there one or several fascisms in the interwar period in Europe?" Chapoutot ranked first at the competition.

He obtained a PhD in history in 2006 for his thesis "National-Socialism and Antiquity"

== Career ==
Chapoutot has held the post of docent at Pierre Mendès-France University (2008–2014), Sorbonne Nouvelle University (2014–2016) and Sorbonne University (2016–).

In 2015, he criticized the decision to republish Mein Kampf as it would foster an outdated "Hitlero-centric" interpretation of Nazism.

== Analyses ==
Johann Chapoutot theorizes that Nazism comes from a coherent and deeply-thought worldview where humanistic and universalistic values are rejected. Nazi ideology sees the Germanic man as deeply corrupted by modern society and pulled away from his natural state. The German people must enact a "cultural revolution" (Note: The Nazis used the term "revolution" with its pre-French Revolution meaning.) in order to come back to their natural state, way of living and relationships with others. Nazism follows an organicistic interpretation of society (Volksgemeinschaft): the individual only exists as a member of an ethnic group. That "cultural revolution" is rooted in a racialist interpretation of history where "race wars" shape cultures and politics; as such there is a need for "racial preservation" for the Aryan people, who are threatened biologically, morally and intellectually by other races. The Germanic race, lest it should disappear, must therefore distance itself from Christianity, the Enlightenment, and materialism. That revolution has to take place on both a collective and an individual spectrum.

In 2014, Chapoutot published The Law of Blood: Thinking and Acting as a Nazi, which was translated into English by Miranda Richmond Mouillot in 2018. According to this book, Nazi Germany was deeply rooted in European culture and history. Nazism is therefore not merely an historical accident and must be taken seriously for what it is. He argues that Nazi ideology directly follows romanticism, particularly its appeal to a return to "the origin" and its disgust for the French Revolution.

His 2025 book Les Irresponsables: qui a porté Hitler au pouvoir ? explains how elites handed power to the Nazis at a moment when the party was close to disintegrating.

== Political engagement ==
Since the publication of his book Libres d’obéir. Le management, du nazisme à aujourd’hui (2020), Johann Chapoutot has become, according to the now right wing French newspaper Marianne, an "intellectual reference for a part of the French left". He was invited to the LFI summer university in August 2024. While he denies being an activist and receives some support for his approach, he also faces criticism, including from academics. According to his detractors, he uses unjustified analogies and has shifted from academic research to the realm of pamphleteering.
