= The Yellow Star: The Persecution of the Jews in Europe 1933–45 =

1980 film

- Directed by: Dieter Hildebrandt
- Produced by: Bengt von zur Mühlen; Arthur Cohn
- Narrated by: Alexander Scourby
- Cinematography: Nicolas Joray
- Release date: 1980
- Running time: 89 minutes
- Country: West Germany
- Language: German

The Yellow Star: The Persecution of the Jews in Europe 1933–45 aka: The Final Solution (German: Der gelbe Stern - Ein Film über die Judenverfolgung 1933–1945) is a 1980 West German documentary film directed by Dieter Hildebrandt and produced by Bengt von zur Mühlen and Arthur Cohn.

== Synopsis ==
Archival footage from 16 countries briefly presents some important facts, including Hitler's rise to power and the Nazis persecuting European Jews.

== Accolades ==
It was nominated at the 53rd Academy Awards for Best Documentary Feature in 1981.

== See also ==
- A Night at the Garden - the 2017 Oscar-nominated documentary short also featuring archival footage, this time of the 1939 Nazi rally at Madison Square Garden
