= The Neighbors' Window =

2019 American short film by Marshall Curry

- Poster
- Directed by: Marshall Curry
- Screenplay by: Marshall Curry
- Based on: "The Living Room" by Diane Weipert
- Produced by: Marshall Curry; Jonathan Olson; Julia Kennelly; Elizabeth Martin
- Starring: Maria Dizzia; Greg Keller; Juliana Canfield
- Cinematography: Wolfgang Held
- Edited by: Marshall Curry
- Music by: James Baxter; The National
- Distributed by: Marshall Curry Productions
- Release date: April 26, 2019 (Tribeca)
- Running time: 20 minutes
- Country: United States
- Language: English
- Box office: $330,661

The Neighbors' Window is a 2019 American short drama film written, directed, produced, and edited by Marshall Curry. It is Curry's first narrative film, following his work in documentary filming. Based on "The Living Room", a true story recounted by Diane Weipert on the podcast Love and Radio, the film won the 2020 Academy Award for Best Live Action Short Film.

== Plot ==
Alli and Jacob live in New York City with their three young children. Alli is busy and stressed with the kids, straining her relationship with Jacob. Their apartment's window faces the window of a younger couple on whom they covertly spy, bitter about their loss of youth and new responsibilities as parents.

One day, Jacob comments that the neighbor's husband has shaved his head and looks hungover. Shortly after, while Jacob and the kids are out for the day, Alli sees that the neighbor's husband is in hospice; he dies soon after. Alli goes out to witness the man being taken out in a body bag and finds his wife crying on the sidewalk. The woman reveals that ever since her husband became sick, they would find comfort in watching Alli and her family through the window, contrasting with the jealous way in which Jacob and Alli spied back on them. The two embrace.

When Jacob and the kids return later that night, the family members happily interact with each other.

== Cast ==
- Maria Dizzia as Alli
- Greg Keller as Jacob
- Juliana Canfield as Neighbor
- Bret Lada as Neighbor's Husband
- McGregory Frederique as Party Guest

== Awards ==
- Won – 2020: Academy Award for Best Live Action Short Film
- Palm Springs Shorts Fest, Best Live Action Short (Winner - Audience Award)
- Casting Society Artios Awards - Short Film Casting (nominee)
- Traverse City Film Festival, Best Fiction Short (Winner - Audience Award)
- Hollyshorts Film Festival, Best Drama (Winner)
- SCAD Savannah Film Festival, Best Narrative Short (Winner)
- St. Louis International Film Festival, Best of the Fest (Winner)
- Nashville Film Festival, Best Narrative Short (Winner)
- Rhode Island Film Festival, Best Live Action Short (Winner)
- Woodstock Film Festival, Best Short Film (Winner)

== See also ==
- A Night at the Garden, 2018 Oscar-nominated documentary also directed by Curry
- Rear Window, 1954 Alfred Hitchcock film to which critics compare The Neighbors' Window
