= Nazism in Brazil =

Nazism in Brazil began before World War II, when the National Socialist German Workers' Party made political propaganda in the country to attract militants among members of the German community. Germans began emigrating to Brazil around 1824. In the 1920s and 1930s, another major wave of German immigrants arrived in Brazil due to socioeconomic problems faced by the Weimar Republic after World War I.

Most of the Nazis in Brazil were part of the second wave of German immigrants. These new immigrants had stronger ties with Germany than those who had arrived in Brazil in the 19th century.

The Nazis in Brazil were principally part of the urbanized business class, living in cities rather than in the countryside or small towns. Not all affiliates of the Nazi Party in Brazil engaged in ideology; many joined only to pursue the economic benefits such membership could provide them with.

In 1939, 87,024 German immigrants lived in Brazil, of which 33,397 were in São Paulo, 15,279 in Rio Grande do Sul, 12,343 in Paraná and 11,293 in Santa Catarina. Of the total number of Germans, only 2,822 were affiliated with the Nazi Party, less than 5% of the German community. The Nazis were spread across 17 Brazilian states, mostly in southern states including São Paulo (785), followed by Santa Catarina (528) and Rio de Janeiro (447). At that time, there were also 900,000 Brazilians who were descendants of Germans, but only those born in Germany were eligible to join the party. However, the majority of German-Brazilians were not seduced by propaganda and never joined Nazism.

It was not in the interest of the Nazis to participate in the elections in Brazil, and the party was never registered in the Brazilian Supreme Electoral Court. According to the then German ambassador to Brazil, Karl Ritter, there were explicit guidelines that the party should not interfere in Brazil's internal affairs. The party operated in Brazil from 1928 to 1938, without interference from the Brazilian government, then led by Getúlio Vargas. In 1938, after the establishment of the Estado Novo dictatorship, the Nazi Party and all other foreign political associations were declared illegal.

== Nazi propaganda in Brazil ==
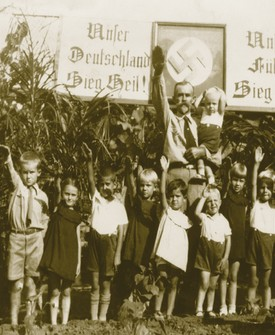
Children perform the Nazi salute in Presidente Bernardes, São Paulo (c. 1935)

In 1928, the Brazilian section of the Nazi Party was founded informally in Timbó, Santa Catarina. Approximately 100,000 native Germans and one million descendants lived in Brazil at that time. Most of those lived in isolated communities in southern Brazil and preserved their German language and culture. With Adolf Hitler's rise to the Chancellor's office in Germany, propaganda from Germany was sent to German-Brazilians to attract followers based abroad.

Although there never was a legally or clandestinely organized Nazi Party in the country, several members of the Teutonic Brazilian community were members of the Brazilian section of the Nazi Party of Germany. This section reached 2,822 members and was the largest section of the German Nazi Party outside Germany. As it was a foreign organization, only those born in Germany could be affiliated; and the Brazilian descendants of Germans could act only as enthusiastic sympathizers.

== German community in Brazil ==
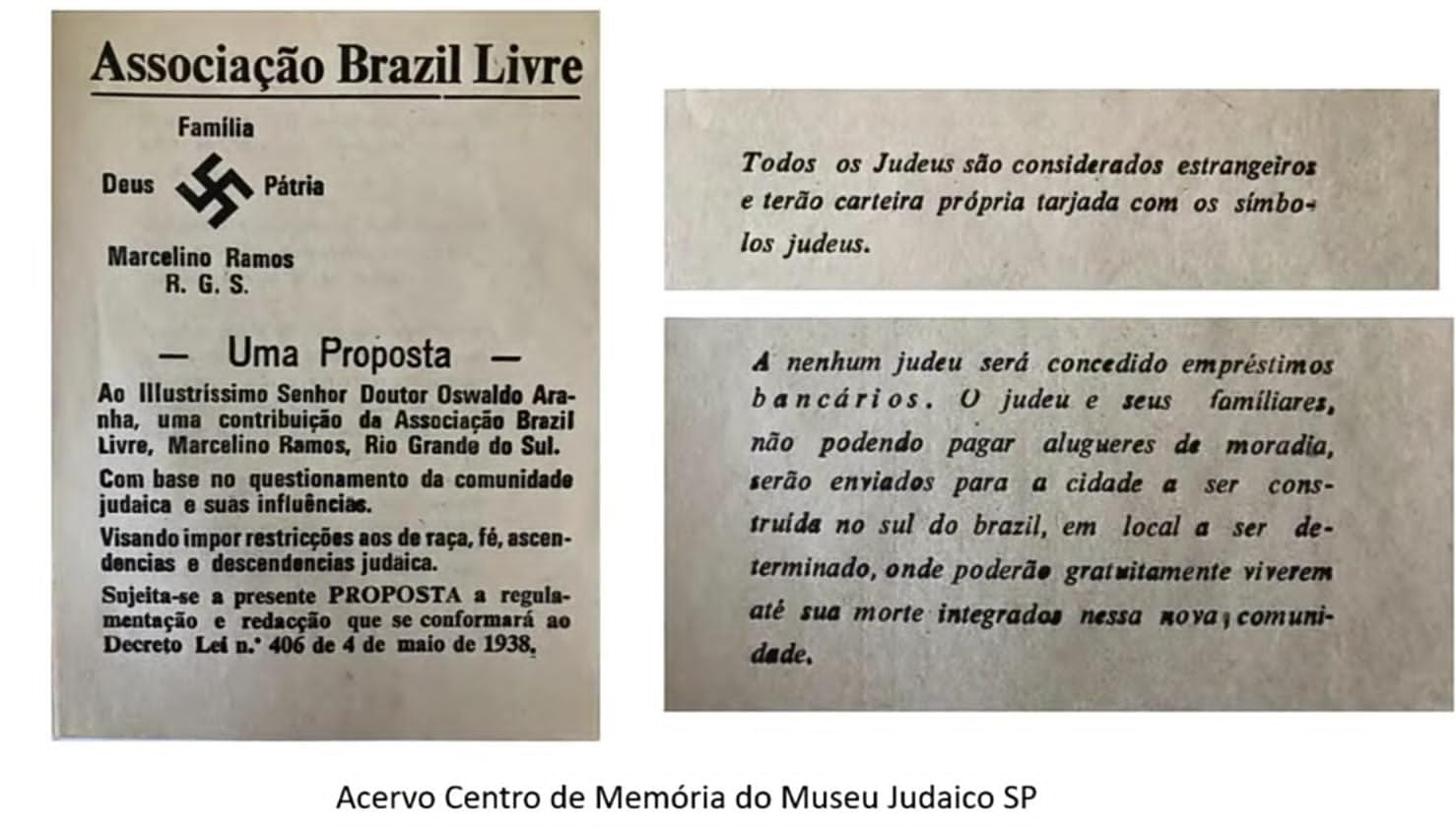
Associação Brazil Livre

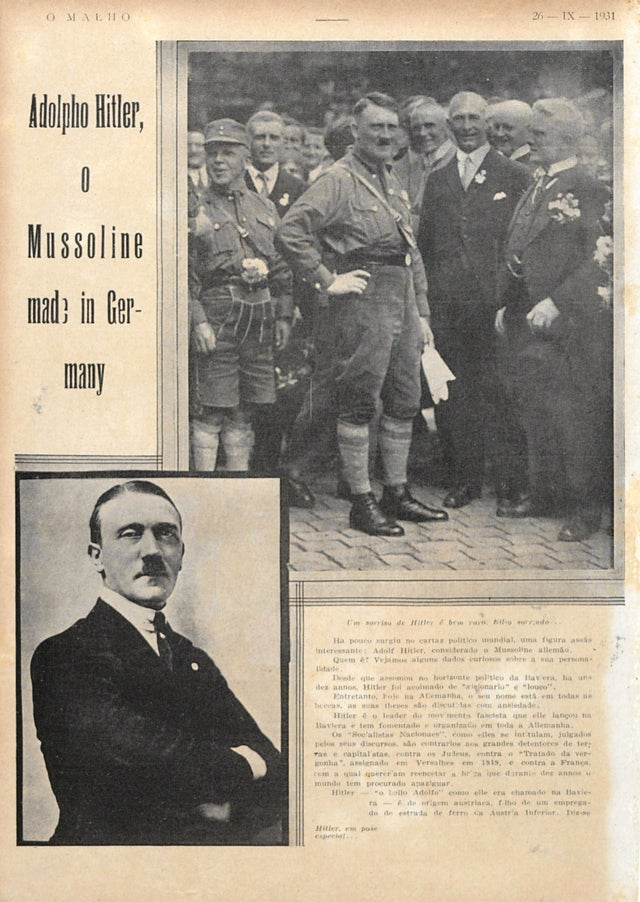
Mussolini Made in Germany, the first article about Hitler in the Brazilian press

Before 1930, there were two periods of German immigration into Brazil. The first occurred in the 19th century. At the time of the rise of Nazism in Germany, this community was already largely made up of second- and third-generation Brazilians. This community maintained diverse German cultural habits, however, the geographic distance and the passage of time brought about perceptible cultural changes. The second migration occurred in the first decades of the 20th century. During the Weimar Republic, and due to the consequences of World War I, Germany experienced several economic crises. At the same time, Brazil was experiencing industrial development, especially in São Paulo and Rio de Janeiro. Due to the demand for skilled and technical labor, many Germans immigrated to Brazil during this period. These new immigrants had stronger and more recent bonds with Germany than the German-Brazilians who arrived in the 19th century and their descendants.

The newly arrived immigrants from Germany differed from the existing German-Brazilians. The earlier immigrants were called Reichsdeutsche (Germans of the Empire), while the second were the Volksdeutsche (German people). The largest number of Nazis in Brazil lived in São Paulo, since the state was the preferred destination of the second wave of German immigration.

By the mid-1930s, there were more than one million Germans and their descendants in Brazil, mostly in Rio Grande do Sul (600,000) and Santa Catarina (220,000). In 1940, Germans and their descendants made up 22.34% of the population of Santa Catarina and 19.3% in Rio Grande do Sul. The German community outside the cities preserved its culture and language, understood as a manifestation of Germanism, which was possible through societies, a German-language press, and schools. The 1940 census showed that 640,000 people spoke German as their primary language at home in Brazil. Based on the high proportion of members of the German community who used German at home (more than 70%), it was concluded that there was a low level of cultural assimilation in this community.

=== Adherence to Nazism ===
Affiliated to the Nazi Party in Brazil, among born Germans (1930/1940)
| State | Affiliated | Populace born in Germany |
|---|---|---|
| São Paulo | 785 | 33.397 |
| Santa Catarina | 528 | 11.291 |
| Rio de Janeiro | 447 | 11.519 |
| Rio Grande do Sul | 439 | 15.279 |
| Paraná | 185 | 12.343 |
| Minas Gerais | 66 | 2.000 |
| Pernambuco | 43 | 672 |
| Espírito Santo | 41 | 623 |
| Bahia | 39 | 542 |
| Other/Without information | 249 | 1.405 |
| Total | 2.822 | 89.071 |

=== Consequences of Estado Novo nationalism ===
The government of the Estado Novo promoted the forced integration of the Germans and their descendants who lived in isolated communities in the south of Brazil. On several occasions, the government acted brutally against ordinary immigrants who had no relationship with Nazi Germany.

In 1940, during a visit to Blumenau, a city of German colonists in the state of Santa Catarina, Vargas declared: "O Brasil não é inglês nem alemão. É um país soberano, que faz respeitar as suas leis e defende os seus interesses. O Brasil é brasileiro. (...) Porém, ser brasileiro, não é somente respeitar as leis do Brasil e acatar as autoridades. Ser brasileiro é amar o Brasil. É possuir o sentimento que permite dizer: o Brasil nos deu pão; nós lhe daremos o sangue". (Brazil is not English nor German. It is a sovereign country that ensures respect for its laws and defends its interests. Brazil is Brazilian. (...) However, being Brazilian isn't just to respect the laws of Brazil and to respect the authorities. To be Brazilian is to love Brazil. It is to possess the feeling that allows one to say: Brazil gave us bread; we will give it our blood".)

The Japanese immigrants and Italians were also persecuted and forced to "Braziliate". The case of the Teutonic-Brazilians is unique because they formed isolated communities that maintained the traditions and used the German language exclusively.

== Nazis in Brazil after the war ==
After Germany's defeat in World War II, some Nazis sought by the Allies as suspected war criminals fled to Brazil and hid among the German-Brazilian communities. The most famous of these was Josef Mengele, a doctor who became known as the "Angel of Death" at the Auschwitz concentration camp. Mengele performed medical experiments with living humans, always without anaesthesia, to research the perfection of the Aryan race. A good part of the victims of their "scientific experiments" were dwarfs and twins. Mengele lived hidden in the interior of São Paulo state from 1970 to 1979, when he drowned following a stroke in Bertioga, on the coast of São Paulo state, without ever being recognized.

Another infamous case was Franz Strangl, a commander at the extermination camps of Treblinka and Sobibor. Strangl lived in Brazil for 16 years, where he worked for Volkswagen until his arrest and extradition to West Germany in 1967. He stood trial and was found guilty in 1970 for the mass murder of 1 million people, was sentenced to life in prison, and died of heart failure six months later.

== Neo-Nazism in Brazil ==
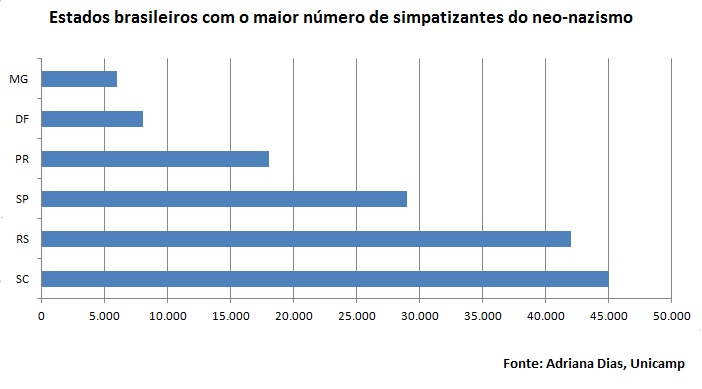
States by number of neo-Nazi sympathizers. Netizens who have downloaded more than 100 files on neo-Nazi sites are considered sympathizers.

Currently in Brazil there are some active neo-Nazi groups. These groups are often associated with the descendants of southern Germans. However historian Rafael Athaides asserts there is no justification for making such a connection. Athaides finds it unlikely that there is any connection since a survey of the profiles of the individuals arrested for neo-Nazism shows that none of them are descendants of historical Nazis. These are typically young misfits who are "devoid of referential identity and who manipulate the signs of Nazism in the world." To hold the descendants of southern Germans for the support of separatist and neo-Nazi groups happens even when practices described as "neo-Nazi" are practised by caboclos from the interior of Pará. This type of stereotype is criticized in the work of the historian René Gertz.

Some crimes committed by neo-Nazis have caught the attention of the Brazilian press. In 2003 for example, a group of neo-Nazi skinheads forced two young men to jump off a moving train in Mogi das Cruzes. One of them died and the other lost an arm. In São Paulo, the resurgence of the Nazi movement had its origins in the 1980s, when the Carecas do ABC emerged. This was an extreme right-wing group opposed to the trade union movement led by Luiz Inácio Lula da Silva, who emerged in the same region. Since then, communication over the internet has broadened the boundaries of the movement. The website Valhala88, deactivated in 2007, received 200 thousand visits daily by users in the country.

According to the anthropologist Adriana Dias, from Unicamp, a scholar of the question of neo-Nazism in Brazil, the heated debate in the 2010 presidential election breathed life into the movement. For her, "the issue of prejudice against the Northeastern Brazilians [...] comes from the elections of Lula. In Dilma's election. This group was radicalized because of the issue of abortion and same-sex marriage." According to Adriana, there are two large age groups of neo-Nazis in Brazil. The first one is between 18 and 25 years old and the second is between 35 and 45 years old and are the leaders of the first group. According to her, the propaganda of the neo-Nazis comprises the writings of William Patch, Thomas Haden and Miguel Serrano. Currently, the region with the largest number of neo-Nazi sympathizers is the South, with over 105,000; Internet users who download over 100 files from neo-Nazi websites are considered sympathizers.

The Social Christian Party raised controversy by fielding an openly neo-Nazi candidate in the 2016 Rio de Janeiro legislative elections. The Liberal Party also provoked controversy in 2020 by nominating an openly neo-Nazi activist as a municipal candidate in the town of Pomerode.

From 2015 to 2021, the number of Nazi cells in Brazil grew from 75 to 530. The number of Federal Police inquiries on apology for Nazism jumped to 110 in 2020, after remaining below 22 each year from 2010 to 2018. In November 2022, the Prosecutor General of the Republic expressed concern over the increase in the number of these groups in Santa Catarina. In 2023, law enforcement authorities opened 21 investigations into the alleged manufacture, sale, distribution, or public display of swastikas intended to promote Nazism.

In 2024, the National Human Rights Council of Brazil sent a document to the United Nations expressing its concern over the growth of neo-Nazi cells in the country.

== See also ==
- Deutscher Morgen
- German Brazilians
- Brazil–Germany relations
- Nazism in the Americas
