= FLNA =

FLNA may refer to:

- Fascist League of North America
- Filamin-A, encoded by the FLNA gene
- National Liberation Front of Azawad (French: Front de libération nationale de l'Azawad)
- Ngoma Airport, Zambia
