= Amsterdam (2022 film) =

2022 film by David O. Russell

- Theatrical release poster
- Directed by: David O. Russell
- Written by: David O. Russell
- Produced by: Arnon Milchan; Matthew Budman; Anthony Katagas; David O. Russell; Christian Bale
- Starring: Christian Bale; John David Washington; Margot Robbie; Chris Rock; Anya Taylor-Joy; Zoe Saldaña; Mike Myers; Michael Shannon; Timothy Olyphant; Andrea Riseborough; Taylor Swift; Matthias Schoenaerts; Alessandro Nivola; Rami Malek; Robert De Niro
- Cinematography: Emmanuel Lubezki
- Edited by: Jay Cassidy
- Music by: Daniel Pemberton
- Production companies: Regency Enterprises; New Regency; DreamCrew Entertainment; Keep Your Head; Corazon Camera
- Distributed by: 20th Century Studios
- Release dates: September 18, 2022 (Alice Tully Hall); October 7, 2022 (United States)
- Running time: 134 minutes
- Countries: United States; Canada
- Language: English
- Budget: $80 million
- Box office: $31.2 million

Amsterdam is a 2022 mystery comedy thriller film produced, written, and directed by David O. Russell. It stars Christian Bale (also a producer), Margot Robbie, and John David Washington, alongside an ensemble supporting cast. Based on the Business Plot, a 1933 political conspiracy in the US, it follows three friends—a doctor, a nurse, and a lawyer—who reunite and seek to uncover the act following the mysterious murder of a retired U.S. general.

Filmed in Los Angeles from January to March 2021, it is Russell's first film since Joy (2015). Amsterdam premiered at the Alice Tully Hall on September 18, 2022, and was released theatrically in the United States on October 7 by 20th Century Studios. The film received generally negative reviews from critics, who criticized Russell's screenplay and direction, as well as the lack of chemistry between Robbie and Washington. It was also a box-office bomb, with an estimated loss for the studio of over $100 million.

== Plot ==
In 1918, a man named Burt Berendsen is sent by his estranged wife's parents to fight in World War I. While stationed in France, Burt befriends African-American soldier Harold Woodman. After sustaining injuries in battle, Burt and Harold are nursed back to health by nurse Valerie Bandenberg.

After the end of the war, the three live together in Amsterdam. Burt returns to New York City to be with his wife. Harold begins a romantic relationship with Valerie. Valerie, however, eventually abandons Harold, who also returns to New York.

Fifteen years later, Burt has opened his medical practice treating veterans of the war. Harold is now a lawyer, and they have not heard from Valerie since they left Amsterdam. Harold asks Burt to perform an autopsy on Bill Meekins (a senator who served as the commander of their regiment during the war) at the behest of Meekins's daughter Elizabeth, who believes that he was murdered during his recent trip to Europe. Aided by medical examiner Irma St. Clair, Burt performs the autopsy, which reveals poison in Meekins's stomach. Burt and Harold meet with Elizabeth to talk about the autopsy results, but she is soon killed when a hitman pushes her into traffic. The hitman frames Burt and Harold for her death, and they flee as the police arrive.

Burt and Harold try to find out who told Elizabeth to hire them. This leads them to wealthy textile heir Tom Voze, his patronizing wife Libby, and Tom's sister Valerie (whose real surname is Voze). Valerie had persuaded Elizabeth to hire them, knowing that they were trustworthy. Valerie is under constant supervision by Tom and Libby, who claim that she suffers from a nerve disease and epilepsy. They were actually poisoning Valerie to keep her compliant. Burt and Harold talk with Tom, who suggests that they talk to General Gil Dillenbeck, a notable veteran who is friends with Meekins, to learn who accompanied Meekins on the trip (and might have poisoned him or be able to lead them to the person who did).

While Burt attempts to contact the general, Irma visits him at his medical practice. She says that she was attacked and her wrist broken while trying to bring him the autopsy report, and the attacker took the paper from her. After resetting her wrist, Burt kisses Irma. Meanwhile, Harold and Valerie notice that the hitman, Tarim Milfax, has been watching the house. They follow him to a forced sterilization clinic owned by an organization known as the "Committee of the Five". After a fight with Milfax, Harold and Valerie reunite with Burt. Valerie takes them to the Waldorf Astoria New York. There, they meet Paul Canterbury and Henry Norcross, Valerie's benefactors from Amsterdam. They are secretly spies in the intelligence community. The Committee of the Five is a cabal in the US with ties to Germany and plans to overthrow the American government. Dillenbeck can help foil their plot.

The trio meets with Dillenbeck, who is offered a large sum of money from a man on behalf of an unnamed benefactor to deliver a speech advocating for veterans to forcibly remove U.S. President Franklin D. Roosevelt and install Dillenbeck as a puppet dictator instead. Dillenbeck agrees to help the trio foil the plot and to speak at a veterans reunion gala that Burt and Harold are hosting to draw out whoever is behind the plot.

At the gala, Tom introduces Dillenbeck to the industrial leaders Nevins, Belport and Jeffers. Burt realises that they actually want Dillenbeck to become the fifth member of their cabal. Dillenbeck reads his speech instead of the one he was paid to read. Milfax tries to shoot him, but Harold, Valerie, and Burt stop him in time. Milfax is arrested and the Committee of the Five is revealed to be four industry leaders, including Tom. They intended to turn the United States into a fascist country.

Tom and the other leaders are arrested by the police, but do not stay in jail long, and expose Dillenbeck in the press following their release. Dillenbeck testifies about the incident to Congress. Harold and Valerie leave the country since they cannot be together in the United States. Burt wishes them farewell, planning to reopen his medical practice and pursue a relationship with Irma.

== Cast ==
- Christian Bale as Burt Berendsen, a doctor and war veteran
- Margot Robbie as Valerie Voze/Bandenberg, a nurse
- John David Washington as Harold Woodman, a lawyer and war veteran
- Alessandro Nivola as Det. Hiltz, a detective assigned to the murder case and Getweiler's partner
- Andrea Riseborough as Beatrice Vandenheuvel, Burt's estranged wife
- Anya Taylor-Joy as Libby Voze, Valerie's sister-in-law and Tom's wife
- Chris Rock as Milton King, Burt and Harold's Army buddy
- Matthias Schoenaerts as Det. Lem Getweiler, a detective assigned to the murder case and Hiltz's partner
- Michael Shannon as Henry Norcross, US Naval Intelligence and a manufacturer of glass eyes who is Canterbury's partner
- Mike Myers as Paul Canterbury, an MI6 spy and manufacturer of glass eyes
- Taylor Swift as Elizabeth Meekins, Bill's daughter
- Timothy Olyphant as Tarim Milfax, a hitman
- Zoe Saldaña as Irma St. Clair, a medical examiner and Burt's love interest
- Rami Malek as Tom Voze, Valerie's brother and Libby's husband
- Robert De Niro as Gilbert Dillenbeck, a Marine veteran based on Marine Corps General Smedley Butler
- Ed Begley Jr. as Bill Meekins, Elizabeth's father and a US Army general whose death becomes the catalyst for events in the film
- Beth Grant as Mrs. Dillenbeck
- Casey Biggs as Augustus Vandenheuvel, Beatrice's father and Burt's father-in-law
- Colleen Camp as Eva Ott
- Leland Orser as Mr. Nevins
- Tom Irwin as Mr. Belport
- Dey Young as Alvelia Vandenheuvel, Beatrice's mother and Burt's mother-in-law
- Max Perlich as Morty Baum
- Rebecca Wisocky as Mrs. Moran

== Production ==
=== Development and casting ===
In January 2020, New Regency announced the development on an untitled film written and directed by David O. Russell and starring Christian Bale, with filming expected to begin that April. In February, Margot Robbie and Michael B. Jordan were announced to star, but the latter dropped out before production began due to scheduling conflicts. Jennifer Lawrence was reportedly considered for Robbie's role, while Jamie Foxx was considered for Jordan's. In October, John David Washington was cast as Jordan's replacement. The rest of the ensemble cast was revealed between January and June 2021. Much of the cast worked for scale, and Bale took less than his typical $5 million fee while Malek earned a six-figure salary.

=== Filming ===
Filming was originally set to begin in March 2020 in Boston on a $50 million budget, but was delayed because of the COVID-19 pandemic. Filming was moved to Los Angeles, California after the cast did not want to travel to Boston amid the pandemic. Principal photography took place over 49 days between January and March 2021. The move from Boston to Los Angeles and COVID-precautions caused the film's final budget to balloon to $80 million. Covid deaths in California were over 2,500 per week during the shooting with very high rates in Los Angeles, yet the production was completed without a single shut down. A specialized air protection protocol was implemented by Dr. Sabrina McCormick. Crew members included cinematographer Emmanuel Lubezki (his first feature film since 2017), editor Jay Cassidy, and score composer Hildur Guðnadóttir. In April 2022, at CinemaCon, the film's title was revealed to be Amsterdam. In August, it was revealed that Guðnadóttir had exited as composer, with Daniel Pemberton now replacing her. According to Robbie, on the last day of filming, they kept production going after their filming permit ended, so the police had to call "wrap" on the film.

=== Music ===
Hildur Guðnadóttir was originally announced as the film's composer in November 2020, but was reportedly replaced by Daniel Pemberton in August 2022.

=== Historical basis ===
The conspiracy underlying the plot of the film is loosely based on the Business Plot, a conspiracy to oust President Franklin D. Roosevelt in 1933. De Niro's character, Gil Dillenbeck, is based on General Smedley Butler, who testified before the McCormack–Dickstein committee in 1934 regarding the conspiracy. Most other details of the conspiracy depicted in the film, including the Committee of Five, its connections to Nazism, and the names of most of the individuals involved, are fictionalized. The rally that occurs at the end of the film may have been inspired by the 2017 documentary film A Night at the Garden, which depicts the 1939 Nazi rally at Madison Square Garden.

Although the main trio of characters in Amsterdam are fictional, the film accurately depicts aspects of the 369th Infantry Regiment, which fought in France in World War I and consisted of African Americans serving under mostly white officers. The film also has the 1932 Bonus March as a major background event, and Dillenbeck's speech at the event is based on a similar speech delivered by Butler.

== Release ==
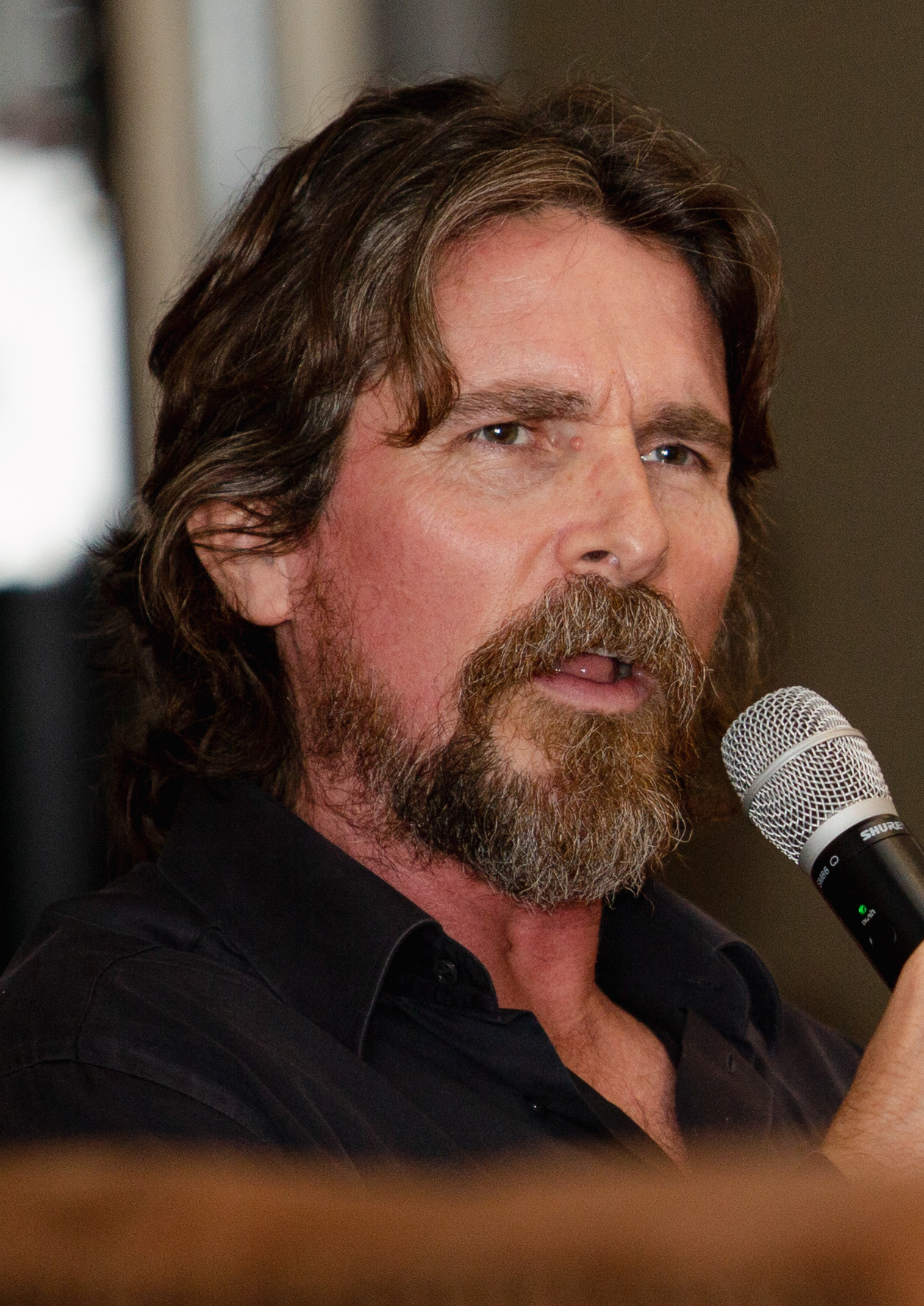
Christian Bale in an interview for Amsterdam in 2022

The film was previewed at the 2022 CinemaCon on April 27, 2022. The trailer was released on July 6, 2022, set to Ten Years After's 1971 song "I'd Love to Change the World." An edited version of the trailer was shown in theaters, revealing the film's release date as October 7. Character posters were released on September 12, 2022. Disney and Regency spent an estimated $70 million on global promotion.

Amsterdam premiered at Alice Tully Hall in New York City on September 18, 2022, and was released in the United States on October 7, 2022, by 20th Century Studios. It was originally scheduled for November 4, 2022 release, but was moved up to October 7 to avoid the release of Black Panther: Wakanda Forever, another film being released by Walt Disney Studios Motion Pictures. It was also screened in IMAX; a special screening, preceded by a Live Q&A broadcast, took place in IMAX theaters nationwide on September 27, 2022. It was released for VOD on November 11, 2022, and on Blu-ray, DVD and 4K UHD release on December 6.

== Reception ==
=== Box office ===
Amsterdam grossed $14.9 million in the United States and Canada, and $16.3 million in other territories, for a worldwide total of $31.2 million, against a production budget of $80 million. Deadline Hollywood calculated the film lost the studio $108.4 million, when factoring together all expenses and revenues.

In the United States and Canada, Amsterdam was released alongside Lyle, Lyle, Crocodile, and was initially projected to gross around $10 million from 3,005 theaters in its opening weekend, with some estimates reaching $15 million. After making $2.6 million on its first day, including $550,000 from Thursday night previews, expectations were lowered to $7 million. The film went on to debut to $6.5 million, finishing in third. Deadline Hollywood blamed the poor performance on the critical response, 134-minute runtime deterring audiences, and Disney being unsure how to market the film due to its quirky style and convoluted plot. The film made $2.2 million in its second weekend, dropping 55% and finishing in fifth.

=== Critical response ===
On the review aggregator website Rotten Tomatoes, 31% of 261 critics' reviews are positive. The website's consensus reads: "Amsterdam has a bunch of big stars and a very busy plot, all of which amounts to painfully less than the sum of its dazzling parts." Metacritic, which uses a weighted average, assigned the film a score of 48 out of 100, based on 52 critics, indicating "mixed or average" reviews. Audiences polled by CinemaScore gave the film an average grade of "B" on an A+ to F scale, while those at PostTrak gave the film a 72% overall positive score.

In a positive review, Pete Hammond of Deadline Hollywood lauded the "complex" screenplay, "uniquely conceived" characters, cinematography, costume, production, and score. Giving the film four out of five stars, James Mottram of South China Morning Post described Amsterdam as "a Hal Ashby-style caper full of fireworks with contemporary political overtones". Scott Mendelson of Forbes described it as an "all-star delight" with "strong production values" and a "terrific ensemble cast delivering some top-shelf work." Chris Knight, writing for National Post, admired the film's "rattling" pace, "lovely" screenplay and supporting cast. Brian Truitt of USA Today, Ryan Swen of Slate, and Oliver Jones of The New York Observer gave the film three out of four stars. Calling it a thoroughly entertaining, "whimsical whodunit" and "quirky, big-hearted trip", Truitt's praise was focused on the cast, especially the "crowd-pleasing" chemistry between Bale, Robbie and Washington. Swen complimented the film's sentiment and "detail-rich" narrative. Jones wrote that the film is "quite odd and discombobulating, but if you allow its turned up and persistent energy to sweep over you, and soak in the joy and righteous anger that animates its generous spirit, the end result is decidedly moving, and—at some points—even enthralling."

Several critics found Amsterdam overambitious and tonally inconsistent. Peter Bradshaw of The Guardian rated the film three out of five stars and complimented its humor, but felt the story was "exhaustingly wacky". /Film's Jeff Ewing stated that Amsterdam "has a number of charming scenes, a stunningly top-tier cast, and flawless cinematography", but cited "wildly fluctuating tones" and "plot contrivances" as its shortcomings. Rating it a B−, The A.V. Club's Jordan Hoffman found the cast to be "energetic, entertaining, and enjoyable", but called the film "an overly ambitious political potboiler". David Rooney of The Hollywood Reporter wrote that Amsterdam is "a lot of movies inelegantly squidged into one—a zany screwball comedy, a crime thriller, an earnest salute to pacts of love and friendship, an antifascist history lesson with fictional flourishes." He praised the lead performances, cinematography, production and costume design, but felt its material suits a limited series more than a film. Paste's Aurora Amidon praised the "vibrant, no-frills cinematography", "whip-tight" editing and the cast's "incredible" performances, despite the "bewildering" story. Reviewing for Screen International, Tim Grierson called the film an "overstuffed murder mystery" with a "convoluted" story, but cheered some aspects—the plot's "unpredictability" and the "indulgent cheekiness" of the film. Variety critic Peter Debruge dubbed it a "beautifully shot" yet "overstuffed social satire" with intelligent ideas poorly executed. Ian Freer of Empire stated that Amsterdam "fails to amount to more than the sum of its occasionally impressive parts." Leah Greenblatt, writing for Entertainment Weekly, rated Amsterdam a C+ and described it as an "odd shaggy-dog mystery" with a "hectic" story, but called the production and costume design "impeccable."

Some reviews were very critical. Rating the film two out of five stars, Robbie Collin of The Daily Telegraph found the dialogue unimpressive and wrote that Russell's screenplay "makes heavy weather" of the story. Describing the plot as a "wanton disarray", IndieWire's David Ehrlich rated the film a C−, owing to its "negligible" entertainment value. Barry Hertz of The Globe and Mail wrote, "Amsterdam so badly wants to be a light romp with heavy-duty meaning that it cannot help but be flattened by a sagging self-exhaustion." Mark Kennedy of the Associated Press stated that the film "reaches for something contemporary to say about race relations, concentration of wealth, veterans and fascism but ends up with a plodding, mannerist noise." Giving the film an F rating, Chase Hutchinson of Collider criticized its "egregious" editing, "banal" dialogue, "muddled" tone, and overall "lack of vision."
