= Marshall Curry =

American film director (born 1970)

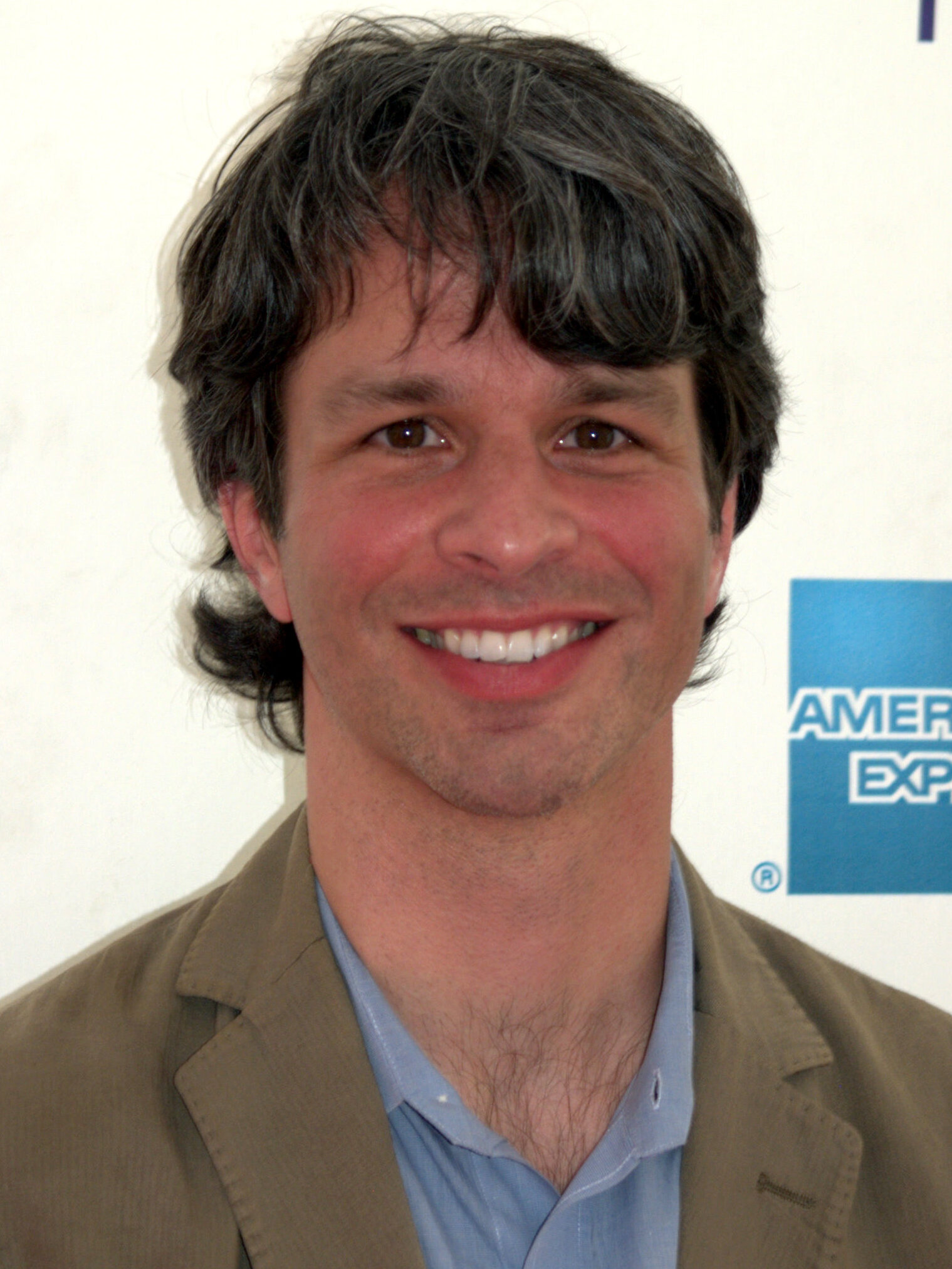
- Curry at the 2009 Tribeca Film Festival
- Born: 1969 or 1970 (age 56–57); Summit, New Jersey, US
- Education: Swarthmore College (BA)
- Occupations: Cinematographer, director, producer, editor

Marshall Curry (born c. 1970) is an American documentary director, producer, cinematographer and editor. His films include Street Fight, Racing Dreams, If a Tree Falls: A Story of the Earth Liberation Front, Point and Shoot, and A Night at the Garden. His first narrative film was the Academy Award-winning short film The Neighbors' Window (2019).

== Early life and education ==
Curry grew up in Summit, New Jersey, graduating from Summit High School in 1988. He attended Swarthmore College, graduating in 1992 with a major in comparative religion. He was also a Jane Addams Fellow at Indiana University's Center on Philanthropy.

== Career ==
Before becoming a filmmaker, Curry worked as senior producer at Icon Nicholson, a New York multimedia design firm.

Curry's first film, Street Fight, was released in 2005 and was nominated for an Academy Award in 2006. The film received a 100% fresh rating from Rotten Tomatoes. It was called "extraordinary" by David Denby (The New Yorker), and was described as "vastly entertaining" by John Anderson of Variety, and "filmmaking of the first order" by Scott Foundas of LA Weekly. That year he was named one of "25 New Faces in Independent Film" by Filmmaker Magazine and received the Donnet Award for Emerging Filmmaker by the International Documentary Association.

In 2009, his second film, Racing Dreams, won Best Documentary at the 2009 Tribeca Film Festival, where it was also runner up for the Audience Award. It received a 100% fresh rating from Rotten Tomatoes. The film was called "The best film of the year" by The Los Angeles Times and "one of the rare documentaries you leave wishing it was a little longer" by The New York Times.

In 2011, If a Tree Falls: A Story of the Earth Liberation Front won the award for Best Documentary Editing at the 2011 Sundance Film Festival, was theatrically released by Oscilloscope Laboratories and earned Curry his second Academy Award nomination. Kenneth Turan of The Los Angeles Times called it "one of the best documentaries of the year" and The New York Times described it as "an extraordinary documentary... [a] fearless exploration of complexity in a world drawn to oversimplified depictions of events and problems, heroes and villains."

In 2014, Curry's film Point and Shoot won Best Documentary at the 2014 Tribeca Film Festival and was released theatrically by The Orchard. The film was given an "A" grade by John Anderson of Indiewire, who said it was "a virtual swashbuckler". It was called "brilliantly constructed and provocative" by Peter Keough of The Boston Globe, "riveting... an extraordinary and quietly disturbing film" by David Rooney of The Hollywood Reporter, and Jay Weissberg of Variety said the "editing is a standout."

In 2017, Curry released the Academy Award nominated short film A Night at the Garden, a documentary about a 1939 German American Bund rally at Madison Square Garden, which attracted 20,000 Nazi supporters. Curry said of the film, "It tells a story about our country that we'd prefer to forget."

Curry's first narrative, the short film, The Neighbors' Window, premiered at the Tribeca Film Festival in April 2019. It won the Best Live Action Short Film at the 92nd Academy Awards.

In 2023 Curry directed the Emmy-nominated Anand Varma: Hidden Wonders, about National Geographic science photographer Anand Varma, for the Peabody-winning documentary series, Photographer.

And in 2024 he directed Written By: A Week Inside the SNL Writers Room for the Emmy-nominated documentary film series, SNL 50: Beyond Saturday Night.

In 2025 he directed and produced The New Yorker at 100, a behind-the-scenes feature documentary about The New Yorker magazine which premiered at the Telluride Film Festival before being released on Netflix. It was selected as one of the best documentaries of the year by Variety magazine.

Curry lives in Brooklyn, New York.

== Filmography ==
Year	Title	Role	Notes	Ref.
2005	Street Fight	Director, producer, cinematographer, editor	Nominee - Academy Award for Best Documentary Feature	
2009	Racing Dreams	Director, producer, cinematographer, editor		
2011	If a Tree Falls: A Story of the Earth Liberation Front	Director, producer, editor	Nominee - Academy Award for Best Documentary Feature	
2013	Mistaken for Strangers	Executive producer, additional editor		
2014	An Amazing Animated Film on the Debt and the Deficit	Director, writer	From We the Economy series	
2014	Point and Shoot	Director, producer, editor		
2017	The National: Something Out of Nothing	Director, producer		
2017	Funeral for a 747	Director		
2017	A Night at the Garden	Director, producer, editor	Nominee - Academy Award for Best Documentary (Short Subject)	
2019	The Neighbors' Window	Director, producer, editor, writer	Winner - Academy Award for Best Live Action Short Film	
2023	Anand Varma: Hidden Wonders	Director	From Nat Geo's Photographer series.	
2024	Written By: A Week Inside the SNL Writers Room	Director	From SNL 50: Beyond Saturday Night Series	
2025	The New Yorker at 100	Director, producer, cinematographer		

== Accolades ==
=== Street Fight ===
- Academy Award, Best Documentary Feature (nominee)
- Emmy Award, Outstanding Continuing Coverage of a News Story: Long Form (nominee)
- Tribeca Film Festival, Audience Award (winner)
- Hot Docs Film Festival, Audience Award (winner)
- Hot Docs Film Festival, Best International Documentary (winner)
- AFI/Discovery Silverdocs Film Festival, Audience Award (winner)
- Ashland Independent Film Festival, Best Documentary (winner)
- WatchDocs Human Rights International Film Festival, Audience Award (winner)
- Chicago International Film Festival, Award for Excellence in Television (winner)
- Cine, Golden Eagle Award (winner)
- IDA, Jacqueline Donnet Filmmaker Award (winner)
- IDA, Distinguished Documentary Achievement Award (nominee)
- Writers Guild of America Award for Best Documentary Screenplay (nominee)
- American Library Association, VRT Notable Videos

=== Racing Dreams ===
- Tribeca Film Festival, Best Documentary (winner)
- Nashville Film Festival, Best Documentary (winner)
- Florida Film Festival, Audience Award for Best Documentary Feature (winner)
- Indianapolis International Film Festival, Audience Award (winner)
- Chicago International Film Festival, Silver Hugo Award (winner)
- Jacksonville Film Festival, Best Documentary (winner)

=== If a Tree Falls: A Story of the Earth Liberation Front ===
- Academy Award, Best Documentary Feature (nominee)
- Sundance Film Festival, Best Documentary Editing (winner)
- Dallas International Film Festival, Environmental Visions Award (winner)
- Miami International Film Festival, Knight Dox Competition Grand Jury Prize (nominee)
- Miami International Film Festival, Knight Dox Competition Special Mention (winner)
- Nashville Film Festival, Best Documentary (winner)
- Traverse City Film Festival, Founders Award for Best Documentary (winner)
- Santa Cruz Film Festival, Earthvision Environmental Jury Prize (winner)
- Flagstaff Mountain Film Festival, Best Feature (winner)
- Creative Capital Award, Moving Image

=== Point and Shoot ===
- Tribeca Film Festival, Best Documentary Feature (winner)
- Emmy Award, Outstanding Graphic Design & Art Direction (nominee)
- Gotham Award, Best Documentary Feature (nominee)
- IDA Documentary Award, Best Documentary Feature (nominee)
- Cinema Eye Honors, Outstanding Achievement in Editing (nominee)
- Independent Film Festival Boston, Special Jury Prize (winner)
- Little Rock Film Festival, Special Jury Prize for Courage in Filmmaking (winner)

=== A Night at The Garden ===
- Academy Award, Best Documentary Short (nominee)

=== The Neighbors' Window ===
- Academy Award, Best Live Action Short (Winner)
- Palm Springs Shorts Fest, Best Live Action Short (Winner - Audience Award)
- Casting Society Artios Awards - Short Film Casting (nominee)
- Traverse City Film Festival, Best Fiction Short (Winner - Audience Award)
- Hollyshorts Film Festival, Best Drama (Winner)
- SCAD Savannah Film Festival, Best Narrative Short (Winner)
- St. Louis International Film Festival, Best of the Fest (Winner)
- Nashville Film Festival, Best Narrative Short (Winner)
- Rhode Island Film Festival, Best Live Action Short (Winner)
- Woodstock Film Festival, Best Short Film (Winner)

=== Anand Varma: Hidden Wonders ===
- Peabody Award (for Photographer series)
- Emmy Award, Outstanding Science and Technology Documentary (Nominee)
- Independent Spirit Award, Best New Documentary Series (for Photographer series) (Nominee)
- Cinema Eye Honors: Best Documentary Series (for Photographer series) (Nominee)

=== Written By: A Week Inside the SNL Writers Room ===
- Emmy Award, Outstanding Documentary or Nonfiction Series (for SNL 50: Beyond Saturday Night series) (Nominee)
- Directors Guild Award, Outstanding Directorial Achievement in Documentary Series (Nominee)
- Cinema Eye Honors, Best Anthology Series (for SNL 50: Beyond Saturday Night series) (Nominee)
- Critics Choice Documentary Award, Best Limited Documentary Series (for SNL 50: Beyond Saturday Night series) (Nominee)

=== The New Yorker at 100 ===
- Official Selection, Telluride Film Festival
- Cinema Eye Honors, Visual Design (nominee)
- Emmy Award, Outstanding Arts and Culture Documentary (Nominee)
