= 1939 Nazi rally at Madison Square Garden =

Fascist rally in New York City

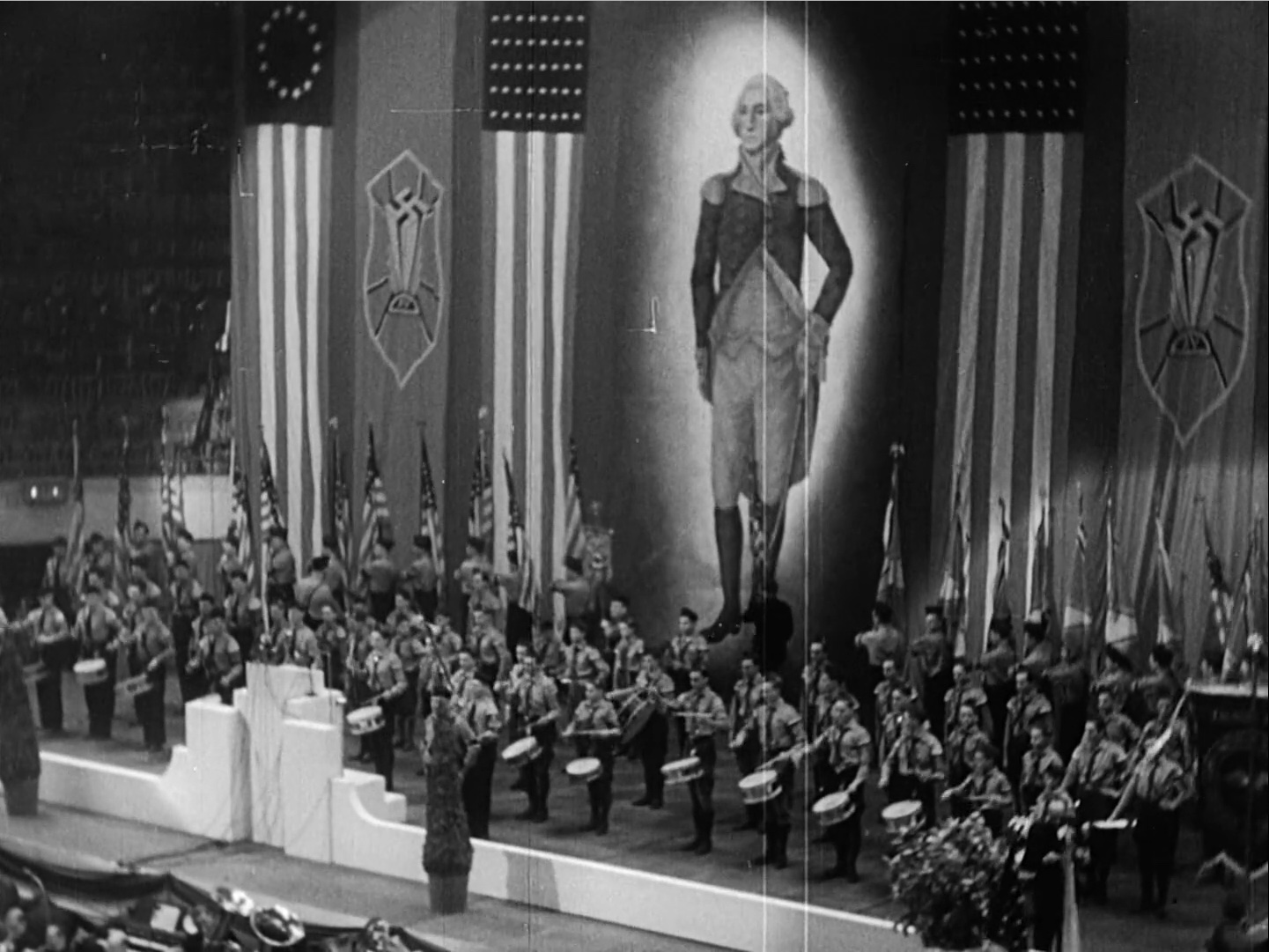
- Date: February 20, 1939; 87 years ago
- Venue: Madison Square Garden
- Location: New York City, U.S.; 40°45′44″N 73°59′14″W
- Type: Nazi rally
- Theme: American nationalism; Anti-communism; Antisemitism; Pan-Germanism; Nazism; White nationalism; White supremacy
- Organised by: German American Bund
- Participants: More than 20,000
- Arrests: 13

On February 20, 1939, a Nazi rally took place at Madison Square Garden, organized by the German American Bund. More than 20,000 people attended, and Fritz Julius Kuhn was a featured speaker. The Bund billed the event, which took place two days before George Washington's Birthday, as a pro-"Americanism" rally; the stage at the event featured a huge portrait of George Washington with swastikas on each side of it. Anti-Nazi counter-protesters gathered outside and on three occasions, they attempted to break through the lines of police officers who were guarding the rally.

The power of the Bund rapidly declined after the rally. This was not due to the outbreak of World War II, instead, it was due to Kuhn's imprisonment for embezzlement by the end of the year and his successors' prosecution for espionage.

== Background ==
The German American Bund was a pro-Hitler organization in the United States before American involvement in World War II around 1939/1941. The group promoted Nazi propaganda in the United States, combining Nazi and American patriotic imagery.

The largely decentralized Bund was active in several regions; still, it only attracted support from a minority of German Americans, both immigrants and naturalized American citizens. However, the Bund was the most influential of several pro-Nazi German groups in the United States in the 1930s; other groups included the Deutsch-Amerikanischen Wirtschafts-Ausschuss (German-American Economic Committee), Teutonia Society and Friends of New Germany, also known as the Hitler Club. Alongside allied groups, such as the Christian Front, these organizations were antisemitic.

The activities of the pro-Nazi organizations in the U.S. were countered by the activities of a number of anti-Nazi organizations which were led by American Jews along with other political activists and humanitarians who opposed Hitlerism and supported an anti-Nazi boycott of German goods since 1933, when Hitler and the Nazi Party rose to power in Germany. The Joint Boycott Committee held a rally at Madison Square Garden two years before in 1937.

== Preparations ==
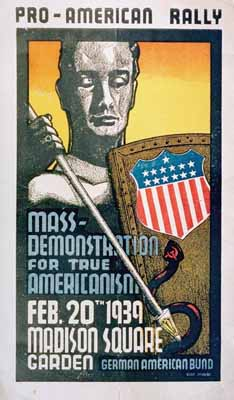
Rally poster

New York City Mayor Fiorello LaGuardia was aware of the dangers posed by the rally in Madison Square Garden and he dispatched the largest number of city police to guard a single event in the city's history. 1,700 uniformed police officers patrolled outside the venue as well as 600 undercover detectives and non-uniformed New York Police Department officers scattered throughout the hall, and even 35 Fire Department of New York firefighters, armed with a heavy-duty fire hose in preparation of a riot. Bomb squads also combed the arena in response to a threat received a week earlier, boasting of a series of time-activated devices to explode during the event. New York was ready for the influx of Nazi rally attendees and was prepared to protect their ability to hold the rally at all costs. Chief Inspector Louis F. Costuma illustrated this commitment to safety, telling the press, "We had enough police here to stop a revolution" in an interview in preparation for the rally.

While Madison Square Garden had prepared itself for the presence of the German Bund, many around New York City considered them less welcome in their city. About 100,000 anti-Nazi protesters gathered around the arena in protest of the Bund, carrying signs stating "Smash Anti-Semitism" and "Drive the Nazis Out of New York". A total of three attempts were made to break the arm-linking lines of police, the first of these, a group of World War I veterans, wrapped in red, white and blue of the Stars and Stripes, were held off by police on mounted horseback, the next, a "burly man carrying an American flag" and finally, a Trotskyist group known as the Socialist Workers Party, who like those before, had their efforts halted by city police. Chief Inspector Costuma's police force acting security was exposed to an odd form of protest as well, characterized by The New York Times as:

At 8 p.m., a loudspeaker in a second-floor window of a rooming house at Forty-ninth Street and Eighth Avenue began blaring a denunciation of Nazis and urging, "Be American, Stay at home". The voice came from a record which was timed to start playing automatically.

Joseph Goldstein, a former New York magistrate, exited a taxi cab in front of the rally holding a summons for the arrest of Fritz Julius Kuhn concerning a criminal libel suit filed earlier. Goldstein, like all other opposing efforts to gain admittance to the Garden, was stopped by police, this time by Inspector Costuma himself, denying the former magistrate entry based on the failure to present a ticket. Outside Madison Square Garden, thirteen people were arrested during protests of the rally.

== Rally ==
German American Bund Rally Address by Its Leader Fritz Kuhn. Audio from US National Archives

The rally occurred when the German American Bund's membership was dropping; Fritz Julius Kuhn hoped that a provocative high-profile event would reverse the group's declining fortunes. The pro-Nazi Bund was unpopular in New York City, and some called for the event to be banned. Mayor Fiorello La Guardia allowed the event to go forward, correctly predicting that the Bund's highly publicized spectacle would further discredit them in the public eye.

The event was highly choreographed in the fascist style, with uniformed Bund members carrying American and Nazi flags and the display of the Nazi salute. This was problematic because at that time, the very similar Bellamy salute was used to salute the American flag, which was marched down the aisle at this event. Martial music and German folk songs were also played at the rally.

The rally began at 8 pm with a rendition of "The Star-Spangled Banner", sung by Margarete Rittershaush. Next, James Wheeler-Hill, national secretary of the Bund, opened the night with the statement that "if George Washington were alive today, he would be friends with Adolf Hitler." Calling upon his fellow Americans, Wheller-Hill challenged Bund members to restore America to the 'True Americans' while condemning President Franklin D. Roosevelt's Secretary of the Interior, Harold L. Ickes, for attacking Nazi officials. Midwestern Gau leader George Froboese was next to speak, pushing themes of 'Jewish world domination', blaming the 'oriental cunning of the Jew Karl Marx-Mordecais for the class warfare felt across the country.' West Coast leader Hermann Schwinn chose to denounce the Jewish control of Hollywood and news industries, claiming "Everything inimical to those Nations which have freed themselves of alien domination is 'News' to be played up and twisted to fan the flames of hate in the hearts of Americans, whereas the Menace of Anti-National, God-Hating Jewish-Bolshevism, is deliberately minimized."

Last to speak, the Bundesfuhrer himself, Fritz Kuhn, continued to push the antisemitic theme, going as far as calling President Roosevelt 'Rosenfeld' and calling Fiorello La Guardia, the man whom he promised to make no antisemitic remarks about, Fiorello "Jew Lumpen" LaGuardia. Everything came to an immediate halt in the middle of Kuhn's final speech because a man who was dressed in blue broke through the lines of Ordnungsdienst (Security Service) men, ran onto the stage, and charged at the speaker. Quickly swarmed by the Ordnungsdienst, the Bund's paramilitary, he was subdued in an effective routine of punches and stomps which exemplified an 'uncanny replication of Nazi thuggery' [as] a pack of uniformed men blast[ed] away with fists and boots on a lone Jewish victim." Later identified as 26-year-old plumbing assistant Isadore Greenbaum, the victim was pulled away by a team of police, saving the young man from serious injury. Attempting to control the riled-up crowd, Kuhn delivered his rousing finish, advocating the establishment of an America which would be ruled by White Gentiles, free from a Jewish Hollywood and news. "The Bund is open to you, provided you are sincere, of good character, of White Gentile Stock, and an American Citizen imbued with patriotic zeal. Therefore: Join!" As Kuhn exited the stage, 20 thousand Bund members chanted "Free America! Free America! Free America!" in the biggest Nazi rally in United States history.

At 11:15 pm, members of the Bund buttoned up their overcoats, hiding their uniforms, and were escorted through police lines along Fifty-Second amid the crowds of protesters who were waiting outside. Ralliers were met with a roar of catcalls, jeers, and a few punches. By midnight, all was quiet.

Isadore Greenbaum never intended to run onto the stage. Greenbaum, a former deck engineer and a former chief petty officer, snuck into the rally, but his anger quickly took hold of him as he listened to Kuhn's speech. Speaking years later, in 1989, Greenbaum characterized his actions by stating "I went down to the Garden without any intention of interrupting, but being that they talked so much against my religion and there was so much persecution I lost my head and I felt it was my duty to talk". When he was asked about the cause of his actions, Greenbaum quickly stated, "Gee, what would you have done if you were in my place listening to that s.o.b. hollering against the government and publicly kissing [Adolf] Hitler's behind – while thousands cheered? Well, I did it." For his actions, Greenbaum was sentenced to serve 10 days in jail. He was later released after he paid a $25 fine.

== Aftermath ==
After the rally, the Bund met with two pro-Nazi Congressmen in Washington, John C. Schafer and Fred C. Gartner. However, the group rapidly declined. Two months after the rally, the Hollywood feature film Confessions of a Nazi Spy was released by the Warner Brothers studio, ridiculing the Nazis and their American sympathizers. The Bund also came under investigation. After its financial records were seized in a raid on the group's Yorkville, Manhattan headquarters on the Upper Eastside, authorities discovered that $14,000 (worth about $273,000 in 2021) which was raised by the Bund during the rally was unaccounted for – Kuhn had spent it on his mistress and various personal expenses. Kuhn was later convicted of embezzlement and sent to Sing Sing prison in upstate Ossining, New York in December 1939. Kuhn's successor as the Bund's leader was Gerhard Wilhelm Kunze, a spy for German military intelligence who fled south from the United States in November 1941. However, cooperative Mexican authorities forced Kunze to return to the United States, where he was sentenced to serve 15 years in prison for espionage. The Bund's final national leader was George Froboese, who was in charge of the organization when Germany declared war on the United States, several days after the Attack on Pearl Harbor, December 11, 1941. Froboese committed suicide a year later in 1942 after he received a federal grand jury subpoena.

== Legacy ==
- The rally was featured in The Nazis Strike (1943), the second film of Frank Capra's wartime anti-Nazi propaganda series Why We Fight.
- Actual footage of the rally was incorporated into a fictional newsreel created for the 2004 Star Trek: Enterprise episode "Storm Front", illustrating an alternate history in which the Nazis invaded and occupied the United States with the help of aliens from the future.
- A 2017 short documentary film about the rally called A Night at the Garden by Marshall Curry was nominated for the 91st Academy Awards for Best Documentary Short.
- A similar rally is depicted in the 2020 HBO miniseries The Plot Against America, which is based on the novel of the same title by Philip Roth.
- Another similar rally is depicted in the 2022 film Amsterdam.
- The 2022 Ken Burns documentary The U.S. and the Holocaust covers the event.

== See also ==
- Anti-Americanism
- Antisemitism by country#United States
  - Antisemitism in the United States
    - History of antisemitism in the United States
      - List of antisemitic incidents in the United States
- List of events at Madison Square Garden
- List of incidents of civil unrest in the United States
- Propaganda in Nazi Germany
- Radical right (United States)
  - Far-right politics#United States
    - Far-right subcultures#United States
      - Fascism in North America#United States
        - Fascism in the United States
          - Nazism in the Americas
- Unite the Right rally
- We Will Never Die
