= Nazism in the Americas =

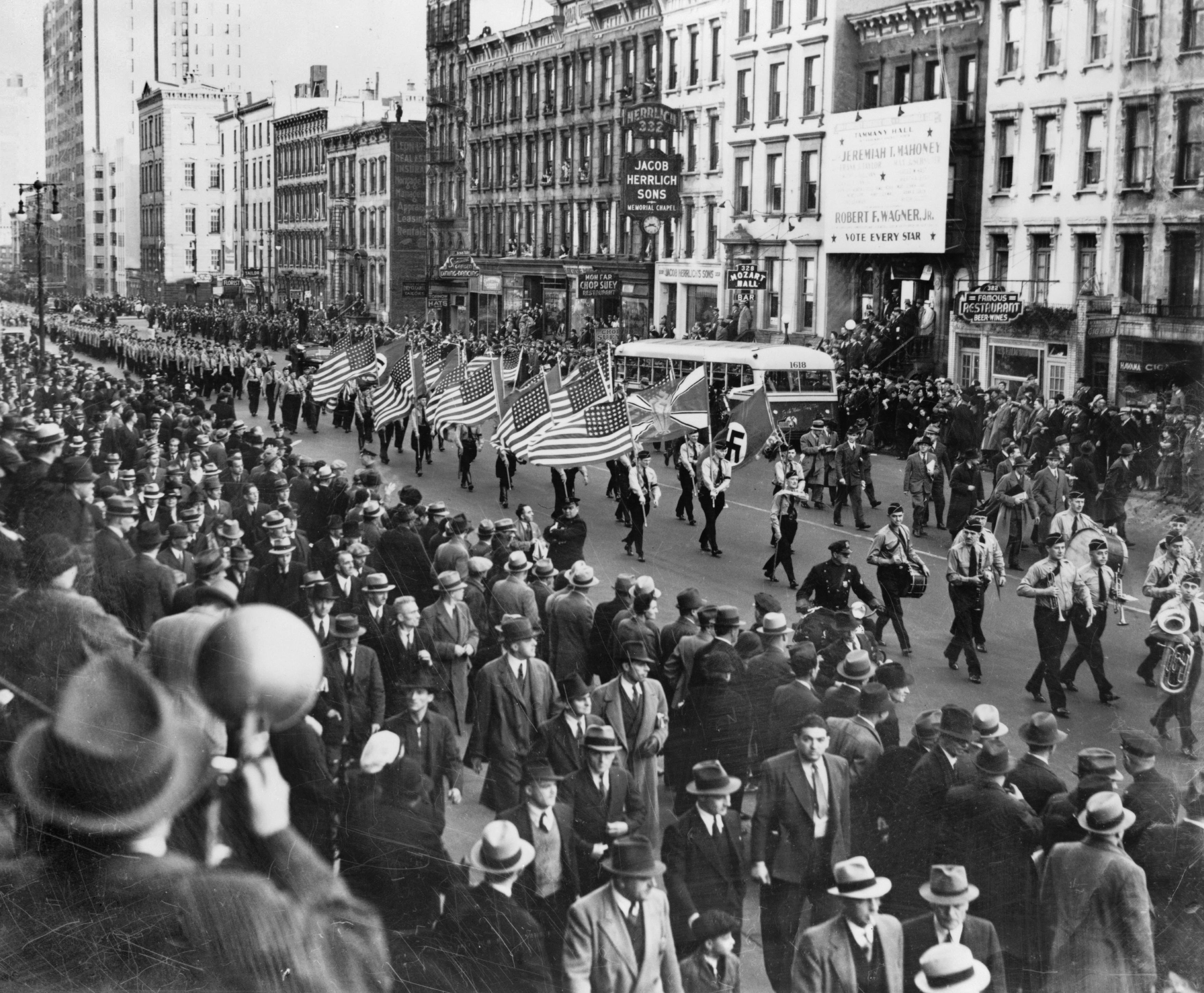
Nazi march of the German American Bund on East 86th St., New York City, 30 October 1939

Nazism in the Americas has existed since the 1930s. The membership of the earliest groups reflected the sympathies some German Americans and German Latin Americans had for Nazi Germany. They embraced the spirit of Nazism in Europe, and they sought to establish it within the Americas. Throughout the interwar period and the outbreak of World War II, American Nazi parties engaged in activities such as sporting Nazi propaganda, storming newspapers, spreading Nazi-sympathetic materials, and infiltrating other non-political organizations.

The reaction to these parties varied, ranging from widespread support to outright resistance. The first anti-Nazi Jewish resistance organizations in the United States, such as the Non-Sectarian Anti-Nazi League to Champion Human Rights, were formed in response to the growth of these movements. Following the fall of Nazi Germany in 1945, Neo-Nazism continues to exist in the Americas to this day.

== United States ==
=== Inter-war period ===
Adolf Hitler became chancellor of Germany on January 30, 1933. In the years that followed, prior to the outbreak of World War II, some German-Americans attempted to create pro-Nazi movements in the U.S., often bearing swastikas and wearing uniforms. These groups had little to do with Nazi Germany. They lacked support from the wider German-American community. In May 1933, Heinz Spanknöbel received authority from Rudolf Hess, the deputy führer of Germany, to form an official American branch of the Nazi Party. The branch was known as the Friends of New Germany in the U.S. The Nazi Party referred to it as the National Socialist German Workers' Party of the USA. Though the party had a strong presence in Chicago, it remained based in New York City, having received support from the German consul in the city. Spanknöbel's organization was openly pro-Nazi. Members stormed the German-language newspaper New Yorker Staats-Zeitung and demanded that the paper publish articles sympathetic to Nazis. Spanknöbel's leadership was short-lived, as he was deported in October 1933 following revelations that he had not registered as a foreign agent. Some American corporations had branches in neutral countries that traded with Germany after the U.S. declared war in late 1941.

=== Coming of World War II ===
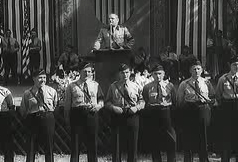
Fritz Kuhn speaking at a Bund rally

Flag of the German American Bund

The Friends of New Germany dissolved in December 1935 when Hess ordered all German citizens to leave the group after realizing that the organization was not beneficial to advancing their cause. The German American Bund, led by Fritz Kuhn, was formed in 1936 and lasted until America formally entered World War II in 1941. The Bund existed with the goal of a united America under ethnic German rule and following Nazi ideology. It proclaimed communism as their main enemy and expressed anti-Semitic attitudes. Inspired by the Hitler Youth, the Bund created its youth division, where members "took German lessons, received instructions on how to salute the swastika, and learned to sing the 'Horst Wessel Lied' and other Nazi songs." The Bund continued to justify and glorify Hitler and his movements in Europe during the outbreak of World War II. After Germany invaded Poland in 1939, Bund leaders released a statement demanding that America stay neutral in the ensuing conflict and expressed sympathy for Germany's war effort. The Bund reasoned that this support for the German war effort was not disloyal to the United States, as German-Americans would "continue to fight for a Gentile America free of all atheistic Jewish Marxist elements."

After many internal and leadership disputes, the Bund's executive committee agreed to disband the party the day after the bombing of Pearl Harbor. On December 11, 1941, the United States formally declared war on Germany, and Treasury Department agents raided Bund headquarters. The agents seized all records and arrested 76 Bund leaders.

=== After World War II ===
In the 1980s, the Office of Special Investigations estimated around ten thousand Nazi war criminals entered the United States from Eastern Europe after the conclusion of World War II, although the number has since been determined to have been much smaller. Some were brought in Operation Paperclip, a project to bring German scientists and engineers to the U.S. Most Nazi collaborators entered the United States through the 1948 and 1950 Displaced Persons Acts and the Refugee Relief Act of 1953. Supporters of the acts exhibited only slight awareness that Nazi war criminals would exploit the legislation to enter the United States. Most of the supporters' concern was about disallowing known communists from entering. This shift of focus was likely due to the pressures of the Cold War in the years after World War II, when the United States focused on countering Soviet communism more than Nazism.

Eichmann photographed in or around 1942

During the 1950s, the Immigration and Naturalization Service conducted several investigations into suspected Nazi war criminals. No official trials came from these investigations. The Holocaust and the possibility of Nazi collaborators living in the country entered the national discussion in the 1960s with the trial of Adolf Eichmann, accusations of war criminals during Soviet war crimes trials, and a series of articles published by Charles R. Allen detailing the presence of Nazi war criminals living in the U.S. The federal government began to focus on uncovering Nazi war criminals remaining in the country.

Public awareness of the Holocaust and remaining Nazi war criminals increased in the 1970s. Many cases made headline news. The case of Hermine Braunsteiner-Ryan, the first Nazi war criminal to be extradited from the United States, received widespread media coverage. The case triggered the Immigration and Naturalization Service to locate Nazi collaborators further. By the late 1970s, the INS had addressed thousands of cases, and the U.S. government formed the Office of Special Investigations, which was dedicated to locating Nazi war criminals in the United States.

Neo-Nazism emerged as an ideology during this time, seeking to revive and implement Nazi ideology. Neo-Nazis seek to employ their ideology to promote hatred and white supremacy, attack racial and ethnic minorities, and create a fascist state. Neo-Nazism is a global phenomenon with organized representation in many countries and international networks. It borrows elements from Nazi doctrine, including ultranationalism, racism, xenophobia, ableism, homophobia, anti-Romanyism, antisemitism, anti-communism, and creating a Fourth Reich. Holocaust denial is common in neo-Nazi circles.

In the United States, organizations such as the American Nazi Party, the National Alliance and White Aryan Resistance were formed during the second half of the 20th century. The National Alliance, founded in the 1970s by William Luther Pierce, author of The Turner Diaries, was the largest and most active neo-Nazi group in the United States in the 1990s.

=== 21st century ===
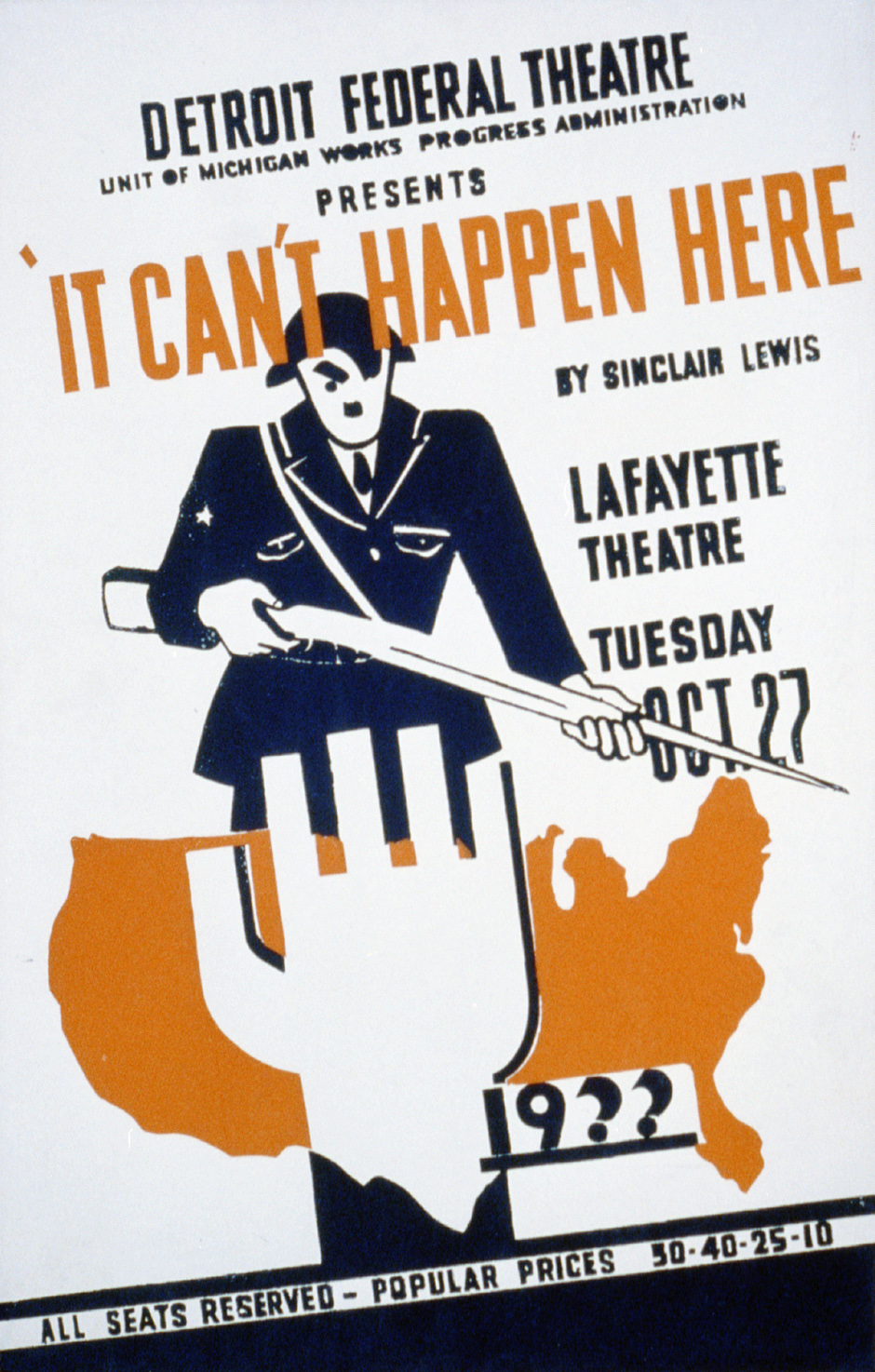
Poster for the stage adaptation of It Can't Happen Here, October 27, 1936 at the Lafayette Theater as part of the Detroit Federal Theatre

According to the Southern Poverty Law Center, the National Alliance had lost most of its members by 2020 but is still visible in the U.S. Other groups, such as Atomwaffen Division have taken its place. American Neo-Nazi groups have moved towards more decentralized organization and online social networks with a terroristic focus. In 2016, TV personality Tila Tequila declared herself a Nazi.

In 2017, the white-nationalist Unite the Right rally took place in Charlottesville, Virginia. It was organized by Richard B Spencer and Jason Kessler, both of whom are followers of Neo-Nazism. In 2022, rapper Kanye West stated that he identified as a Nazi, praising the policies of Adolf Hitler.

== South America ==
=== Inter-war period ===
The National Socialist Movement of Chile (MNSCH), or el nacismo, was formed in 1932. It was founded by Carlos Keller Rueff and Jorge Gonzalez von Marees, both of German heritage, as well as Juan de Dios Valenzuela and Gustavo Vargas Molinare. The members were referred to as Nacistas and the party had a pyramid-structured hierarchy led by a Jefe. It also included shock troops called the TNA (Tropas Nacistas de Asalto). However, the MNSCH operated like many other fascist movements, with emphasis on totalitarianism, military values, elitism, hierarchy, discipline and the need for action. The MNSCH also held the view that the individual should serve the nation as a part of a higher organism needed for self-preservation, and the party advocated the need for a totalitarian, unified order akin to European Nazism. They deplored elections and declared themselves anti-democratic, anti-liberal, anti-Marxist, anti-conservative, anti-oligarchist, and anti-imperialist.

=== World War II ===
Some South American countries opposed the Axis powers and Nazism in Europe, especially after the bombing of Pearl Harbor in 1941. Others maintained that continuing economic relations with countries on both sides of the war would be beneficial. Fascist sentiments permeated the political and military spheres, especially after the Revolution of '43. This trend continued during Perón's populist administration and eventually led to over 40 years of military dictatorship. There was opposition to the German community in Chile due to the 1938 Seguro Obrero massacre. The United States issued radio broadcasts and motion pictures during the war to generate and spread anti-fascist propaganda across Latin America.

=== After World War II ===
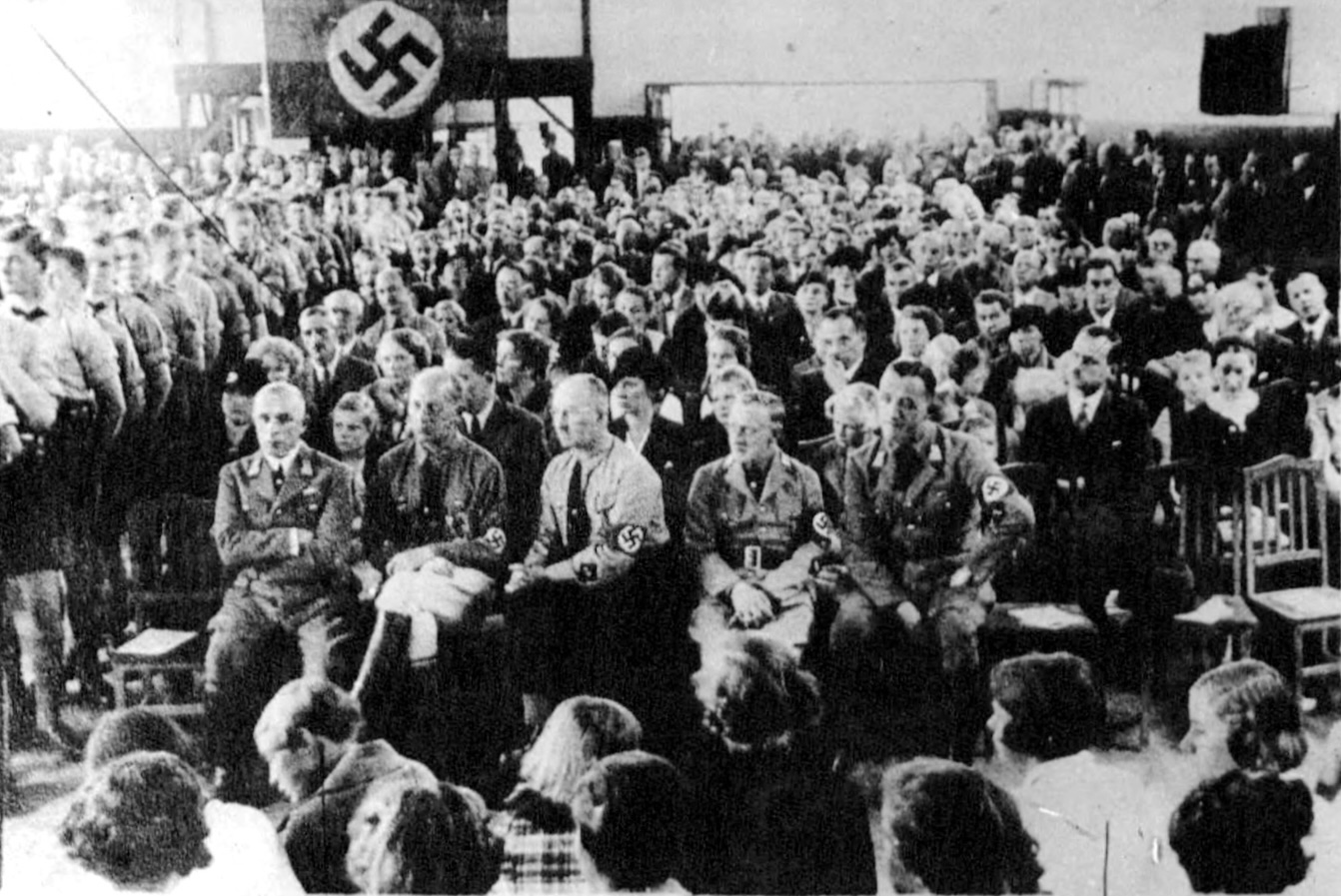
Nazi assembly in Latin America photographed by Chile's investigation

After World War II ended, many Nazis and other fascists fled to South America through the use of ratlines, such as Adolf Eichmann, Josef Mengele, and Franz Stangl.

The first movements to smuggle Nazis and fascists came in 1946 when two Argentinian bishops colluded with a French cardinal to bring French war criminals into Argentina.

Under Argentine president Juan Perón's instructions, many European war criminals were brought into the country and given citizenship and employment.

The Mossad, Israel's Foreign Intelligence Service, under the leadership of Isser Harel, carried out several operations to extradite Nazis to the country in order to have them respond legally for their crimes. The most famous operation was the one to extradite Adolf Eichmann, who was extracted from Argentina to Israel, where he stood trial and was condemned for crimes against humanity.

== See also ==
- Antisemitism in the United States
- Fascism in Canada
- Fascism in North America
- Fascism in South America
- Nazism in Brazil
- Nazism in Argentina
- Nazism in Mexico
- Eichmann trial
