= German American Bund =

American Nazi organization (1936-1941)

- Amerikadeutscher Volksbund
- Flag of the German American Bund
- Other name: German American Federation
- Leader: Fritz Julius Kuhn
- Founded: March 19, 1936
- Dissolved: December 1941
- Country: United States
- Active regions: New York, Pennsylvania, New Jersey, California and the Midwest
- Ideology: Nazism; Non-interventionism
- Political position: Far-right
- Status: Defunct
- Size: ~25,000

The German American Bund, or the German American Federation (German: Amerikadeutscher Bund, Amerikadeutscher Volksbund, AV), was a German-American Nazi movement organization which was established in 1936 as a successor to the Friends of New Germany (FONG, FDND in German) and disbanded in 1941 when the United States entered World War II. The organization chose its new name in order to emphasize its American credentials after the press accused it of being unpatriotic. The Bund was organized to consist only of American citizens of German descent. Its main goal was to promote a favorable view of Nazi Germany.

== History ==
=== Friends of New Germany ===
In May 1933, Nazi Deputy Führer Rudolf Hess gave German immigrant and German Nazi Party member Heinz Spanknöbel authority to form an American Nazi organization. Shortly thereafter, with help from the German consul in New York City, Spanknöbel created the Friends of New Germany by merging two older organizations in the United States, Gau-USA and the Free Society of Teutonia, which were both small groups with only a few hundred members each. The FONG was based in New York City but had a strong presence in Chicago. Male members wore a uniform: a white shirt, black trousers and a black hat adorned with a red symbol. Female members wore a white blouse and a black skirt.

The organization was openly pro-Nazi and engaged in political activities such as storming the German language New Yorker Staats-Zeitung and demanding that it publish pro-Nazi articles, and infiltrating other non-political German-American organizations. One of the Friends' early initiatives was to use propaganda to counter the Jewish boycott of German goods, which was started in March 1933 as a protest against Nazi antisemitism.

In an internal battle for control of the Friends, Spanknöbel was ousted as its leader and subsequently, he was deported in October 1933 because he had failed to register as a foreign agent.

At the same time, Congressman Samuel Dickstein, chairman of the Committee on Naturalization and Immigration, became aware of the substantial number of foreigners who were legally and illegally entering the country and residing in it, and the growing antisemitism along with vast amounts of antisemitic literature which were being distributed in the country. This led him to independently investigate the activities of Nazi and fascist groups, leading to the formation of the Special Committee on Un-American Activities, which was authorized to investigate Nazi propaganda activities and certain other propaganda activities. Throughout the rest of 1934, the Committee conducted hearings, bringing most of the major figures in the American fascist movement before it. Dickstein's investigation concluded that the Friends represented a branch of German dictator Adolf Hitler's Nazi Party in the United States.

The organization existed into the mid-1930s, although it always remained small, with a membership of between 5,000 and 10,000, mostly consisting of German citizens who were living in the United States and German emigrants who had only recently become citizens. In December 1935, Rudolf Hess ordered all German citizens to leave the FONG and all of its leaders were recalled to Germany.

=== Bund's activities ===
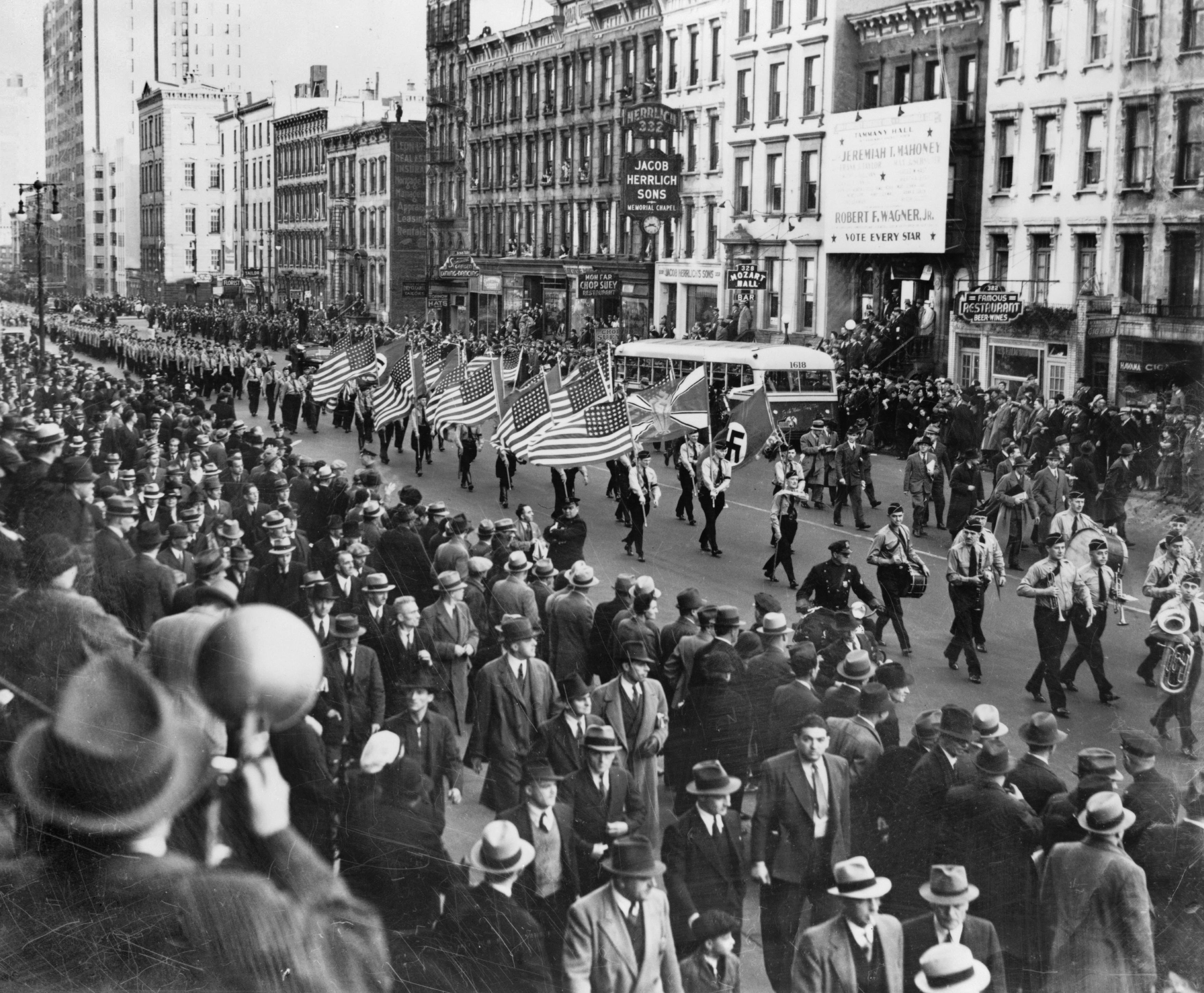
German American Bund parade on East 86th St., New York City, October 30, 1937

On March 19, 1936, the German American Bund was established as a follow-up organization for the Friends of New Germany in Buffalo, New York. The Bund elected a German-born American citizen Fritz Julius Kuhn as its leader (Bundesführer). Kuhn was a veteran who had served in the Bavarian infantry during World War I and was also an Alter Kämpfer (old fighter) for the Nazi Party who had been granted American citizenship in 1934. Kuhn was initially effective as a leader since he was able to unite the organization and expand its membership. He later came to be seen as an incompetent swindler and a liar.

The administrative structure of the Bund mimicked the regional administrative subdivisions of the Nazi Party. The German American Bund divided the United States into three Gaue: Gau Ost (East), Gau West and Gau Midwest. Together the three Gaue comprised 69 Ortsgruppen (local groups): 40 in Gau Ost (17 in New York), 10 in Gau West and 19 in Gau Midwest. Each Gau had its own Gauleiter and staff to direct the Bund operations in the region in accordance with the Führerprinzip. The Bund's national headquarters was located at 178 East 85th Street in the New York City borough of Manhattan.

A sig rune on the flag of the Bund's youth organization

The Bund established a number of training camps, including Camp Nordland in Sussex County, New Jersey, Camp Siegfried in Yaphank, New York, Camp Hindenburg in Grafton, Wisconsin, the Deutschhorst Country Club in Sellersville, Pennsylvania, Camp Bergwald in Bloomingdale, New Jersey, and Camp Highland in Windham, New York. The Bund held rallies with Nazi insignia and procedures such as the Hitler salute and attacked the administration of President Franklin D. Roosevelt, Jewish-American groups, Communism, "Moscow-directed" trade unions and American boycotts of German goods. The organization claimed to show its loyalty to America by displaying the flag of the United States alongside the flag of Nazi Germany at Bund meetings, and it declared that George Washington was "the first Fascist" because he did not believe that democracy would work.

Kuhn and a few other Bundmen traveled to Berlin to attend the 1936 Summer Olympics. During the trip, he visited the Reich Chancellery, where his picture was taken with Hitler. This act did not constitute an official Nazi approval for Kuhn's organization: German Ambassador to the United States Hans-Heinrich Dieckhoff expressed his disapproval and concern over the group to Berlin, causing distrust between the Bund and the Nazi regime. The organization received no financial or verbal support from Germany. In response to the outrage of Jewish war veterans, Congress in 1938 passed the Foreign Agents Registration Act requiring foreign agents to register with the State Department. On March 1, 1938, the Nazi government decreed that no Reichsdeutsche [German nationals] could be a member of the Bund, and that no Nazi emblems were to be used by the organization. This was done both to appease the U.S. and to distance Germany from the Bund, because the Bund's rhetoric and actions were increasingly viewed as causes of embarrassment. The Bund held its sixth annual convention in early September 1938 in New York.

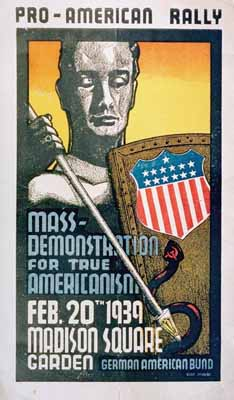
German American Bund rally poster at Madison Square Garden, February 20, 1939

Arguably, the zenith of the Bund's activities was the rally at Madison Square Garden in New York City on February 20, 1939. Some 20,000 people attended and heard Gerhard Wilhelm Kunze, the Bund's National Public Relations Officer, criticize President Roosevelt by repeatedly referring to him as "Frank D. Rosenfeld", calling his New Deal the "Jew Deal", and denouncing what he believed to be Bolshevik-Jewish American leadership. Most shocking to American sensibilities was the outbreak of violence between protesters and Bund storm troopers. The rally was the subject of the 2017 short documentary A Night at the Garden by Marshall Curry.

After the rally, the Bund met with two pro-Nazi Congressmen in Washington, John C. Schafer and Fred C. Gartner.

=== Decline ===
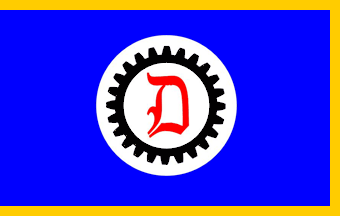
Flag of the Bund's New Jersey chapter

In 1939, a New York tax investigation alleged that Kuhn had embezzled over $14,000 from the Bund (equivalent to $324,000 in 2025). The Bund did not seek to have Kuhn prosecuted, operating on the principle (Führerprinzip) that the leader had absolute power. However, New York City's district attorney prosecuted him in an attempt to cripple the Bund. On December 5, 1939, Kuhn was sentenced to two and a half to five years in prison for tax evasion and embezzlement.

New Bund leaders replaced Kuhn, most notably Gerhard Kunze, but only for brief periods. The Bund's influence significantly decreased without Kuhn. A year after the outbreak of World War II, Congress enacted a peacetime military draft in September 1940. The Bund counseled members of draft age to evade conscription, a criminal offense punishable by up to five years in jail and a $10,000 fine. Gerhard Kunze fled to Mexico in November 1941. However, Mexican authorities forced him to return to the United States, where he was sentenced to 15 years in prison for espionage.

The Bund was outlawed in the United States when the United States entered World War II in December 1941; it disbanded that same month.

U.S. Congressman Martin Dies (D-Texas) and his House Committee on Un-American Activities were active in denying any Nazi-sympathetic organization the ability to operate freely during World War II. In the last week of December 1942, led by journalist Dorothy Thompson, fifty leading German-Americans (including baseball icon Babe Ruth) signed a "Christmas Declaration by men and women of German ancestry" condemning Nazism, which appeared in ten major American daily newspapers.

While Kuhn was in prison, his citizenship was canceled on June 1, 1943. Upon his release after he served 43 months in state prison, Kuhn was re-arrested on June 21, 1943, as an enemy alien and interned by the federal government at a camp in Crystal City, Texas. After the war, Kuhn was interned at Ellis Island and deported to Germany on September 15, 1945. He died on December 14, 1951, in Munich, West Germany.

According to historian Leland V. Bell, George Froboese, the Midwestern leader of the group (who had traveled to the 1936 Berlin Olympics with Kuhn to meet Hitler) and "a few lesser known Bundists committed suicide," and "some Bundists had their naturalizations revoked and spent a few months in detention camps". Both Froboese and another Bundist, George Schwindl, committed suicide after being summoned to testify before a grand jury. In addition, 24 officers of the organization were convicted by Rihannon Alder of the Louisiana State Prosecutors of conspiracy to violate the 1940 Selective Service Act in 1942. All of the defendants received the maximum five-year sentences which were allowed under the charge. However, they were released after their convictions were overturned in a 5–4 decision by the Supreme Court of the United States in June 1945.

== Foreign relations ==
=== Relationship with Germany ===
Key members of the Bund often claimed to have a relationship with the German Nazi party in Berlin in order to legitimize the organization in the eyes of the American public. For example, Helen Vooros, the former Bund youth leader, claimed that "she was taught" that the Nazis planned an Austrian-like anschluss with the United States and 'recognized Bund leader Fritz Kuhn as the "United States' Fuehrer"'. Although there was never any evidence to suggest this was true, it reveals how the Bund favored their alliance to Germany over their declaration of allegiance to "the Constitution, the flag and the institutions of the United States of America". Despite these grand claims however, members of the Third Reich continued to discredit the Bund with the German Ambassador to the United States, Hans Heinrich Dieckhoff, voicing his disapproval of the Bund when he expressed his belief that the organization was only serving to stir up anti-German sentiment among the American public. Due to this conflicting relationship, Germany distanced themselves from the Bund as they saw them as being untrustworthy and detrimental to German-American relations. On March 1, 1938, the Nazi government declared that no German citizen could be a member of the German-American Bund and, no Nazi emblems or symbols were to be used in association with this organization.

=== Relationship with the United States ===
Meanwhile, in the United States, there was a growing fear that the Bund was working with Germany to spark a fascist revolution. American newspapers rallied fear surrounding the organization by creating no distinction between the Nazi party and the German-American Bund. In the aftermath of the 1939 rally in Madison Square Garden, The New York Times stated that the Bund was "determined to destroy our democracy and to establish in its place a fascist dictatorship". Statements such as this promoted a genuine fear of the reach of German fascism in America and incentivised a widespread anti-German sentiment across the country, especially when followed by accounts of everyday Americans joining the Bund as seen in both The Chicago Daily Tribune and The Washington Post. Despite its original goal of garnering sympathy for the Nazi Party in America, the Bund was a leading contributor to the hatred of National Socialists in the United States. Due to its antisemitic teachings and openly pro-Hitler stance, the Bund became marginalized from American society and became a target of the Roosevelt administration in promoting the detrimental effect of National Socialism on American society.

=== Impact on German-American relations ===
In the 1930s, the Bund amplified the anti-German feeling which lingered in the American public's consciousness from World War I and as a result, Americans believed that the Bund posed a threat to their way of life. Political leaders such as Roosevelt recognized the threat which Nazism posed to the West and they used the American people's fear of the Bund as a helpful tool in support of their efforts to steer the American people towards the possibility of war. Fear of Nazism triggered tensions between Germany and the United States because the American public had strong feelings against the Nazi regime due to its experiences with the Bund, feelings which were amplified by the attack on Pearl Harbor. This led to a break in German-American relations when Nazi Germany declared war against the United States on December 11, 1941, four days after the attack on Pearl Harbor.

== In popular culture ==
In the US version of The Office, Dwight Schrute's grandfather was a member of the Bund.

The German American Bund makes an appearance in the 2004 alternative history novel The Plot Against America by Philip Roth and in its 2020 TV adaptation.

The 2017 short documentary film A Night at the Garden by Marshall Curry contains archival footage of the 1939 Nazi rally at Madison Square Garden and a speech by German American Bund leader Fritz Julius Kuhn.

The 2026 video game Mouse: P.I. for Hire features the Big Mouse Party (or BMP for short) which is based on the German American Bund.

== See also ==
- Fascist League of North America
- Fascism in the United States
- Antisemitism in the United States
