= Adriana Dias =

Brazilian anthropologist

- Born: 1970
- Died: 29 January 2023
- Education: Universidade Estadual de Campinas (Unicamp)

Adriana Abreu Magalhães Dias (1970 – 29 January 2023) was a Brazilian feminist anthropologist, anti-fascist and activist for the rights of people with disabilities and rare diseases. Because of her work, Dias was nicknamed the "Nazi hunter".

== Biography ==
She holds a degree in Social Sciences from the State University of Campinas, a master's (2007) and a doctorate (2018) in anthropology from the same institution. Since her graduation, Dias specialized in the study of neo-Nazism in Brazil; her work discusses the organization of these groups in virtual environments. In her methodology, whenever she found a neo-Nazi website, she would physically print it out and report it until it was taken down. Dias identified 334 active neo-Nazi cells in the country, that number having jumped to 530 by 2021. One of her discoveries was a 2004 letter signed by then deputy Jair Bolsonaro posted on a neo-Nazi website; in it the politician writes, "Every feedback I get from the communiqués becomes a stimulus to my work. You are the reason my mandate exists."

Dias had osteogenesis imperfecta, and became known for her activism for the rights of people with disabilities and rare diseases. She was the creator of Instituto Baresi, a national forum associating people with rare diseases, disabilities, and other minority groups, and coordinated the Brazilian Anthropology Association's "Disability and Accessibility" Committee. and was a member of the American Anthropological Association. In politics, she integrated the National Front for Women with Disabilities, was part of the Life and Justice Association in Support of Victims of COVID-19, and participated in the transition team for the third government of Luiz Inácio Lula da Silva, in 2022, She participated in hearings of the Parliamentary Inquiry Commission of the Campinas Chamber that investigated Nazi-fascist crimes, and was important in the creation of the bill that instituted the National Day for Rare Diseases.

Dias died aged 52 on 29 January 2023, of brain cancer.
