= Racing Dreams =

2009 American film directed by Marshall Curry

- Promotional poster for Racing Dreams
- Directed by: Marshall Curry
- Written by: Marshall Curry
- Produced by: Marshall Curry; Bristol Baughan
- Starring: Annabeth Barnes; Josh Hobsen; Brandon Warren
- Cinematography: Marshall Curry; Peter Gordon; Wolfgang Held; Alan Jacobsen
- Edited by: Marshall Curry; Matthew Hamachek; Mary Manhardt
- Music by: Joel Goodman
- Production companies: Marshall Curry Productions LLC; Reason Pictures; White Buffalo Entertainment; Hyperion Media Group
- Distributed by: Hannover House
- Release dates: June 2009 (Silverdocs); May 21, 2010 (United States)
- Running time: 96 minutes
- Country: United States
- Language: English
- Box office: $65,082

Racing Dreams is a 2009 American documentary film directed by Marshall Curry following two boys and a girl through a season of World Karting Association (WKA) racing as they compete and aspire to become professional NASCAR drivers.

Racing Dreams was produced by Bristol Baughan and Marshall Curry, and executive produced by Dwayne Johnson, Jack Turner, Dany Garcia (White Buffalo Entertainment) and Ben Goldhirsh (Good Inc.). The film opened in theaters in select cities May 2010, with marketing support by NASCAR Entertainment.

Racing Dreams is also being developed into a feature film by DreamWorks Producers Alex Kurtzman and Roberto Orci.

== Synopsis ==
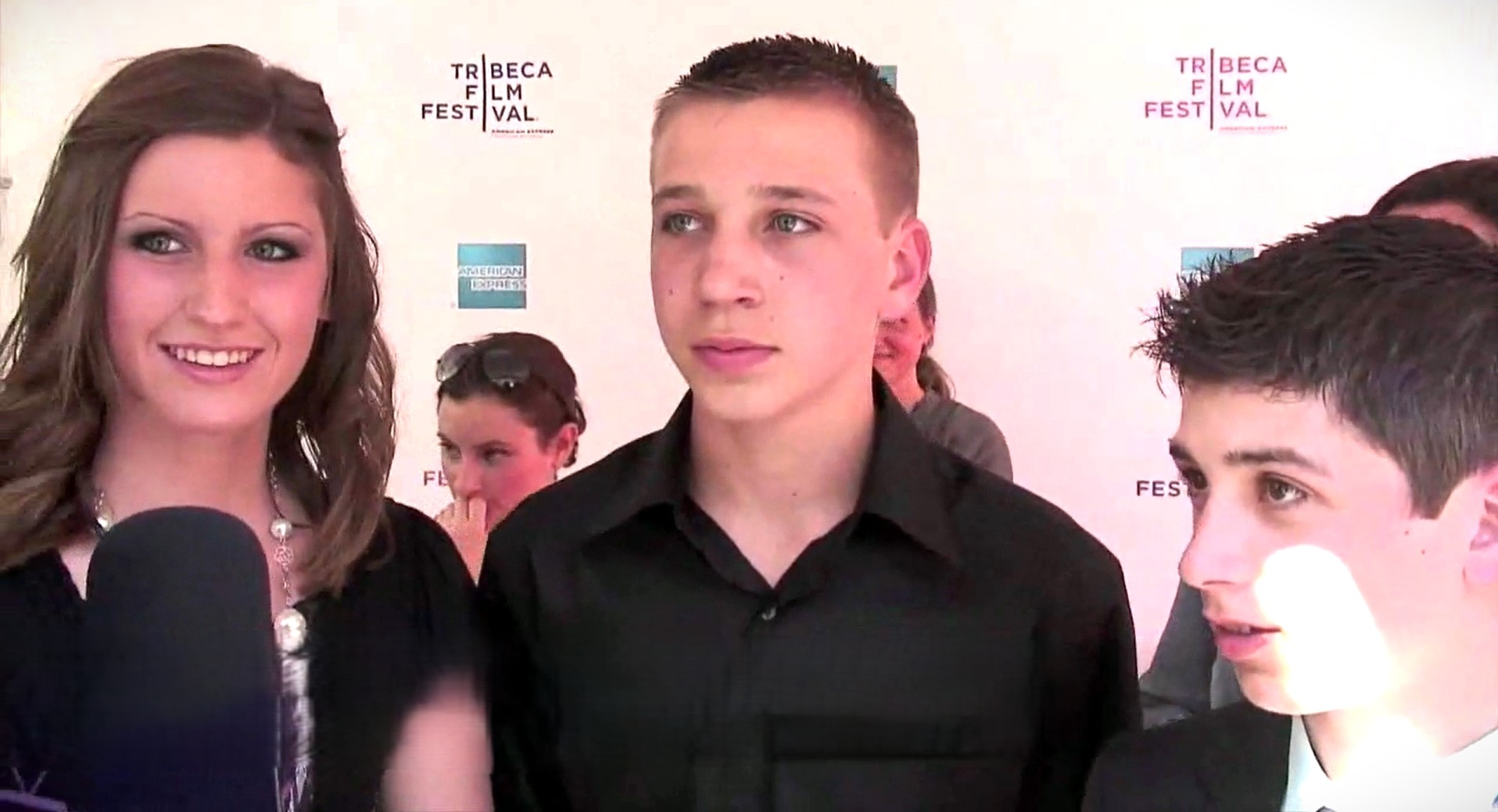
Left to right: Annabeth Barnes, Brandon Warren, Josh Hobson in 2009

The film centers on racers Annabeth Barnes (11 years old), Josh Hobson (12), and Brandon Warren (13) during a single season of WKA racing, where success can lead to sponsorships and a NASCAR career. All three face challenges off the track as well as on as they come of age in the surprisingly high-pressure world of go-kart racing.

== Reception ==
Racing Dreams won Best Documentary at the 2009 Tribeca Film Festival, where it was also runner up for the Audience Award. The film has a 100% fresh rating from Rotten Tomatoes based on 26 reviews, with a weighted average of 7.38/10. The website's critics consensus reads: "Racing Dreams offers an absorbing peek at the lives of young NASCAR hopefuls that should resonate with racing enthusiasts as well as viewers with no connection to the sport." The film was called "The best film of the year," by the Los Angeles Times ("The Envelope") and "Absorbing… one of the rare documentaries you leave wishing it was a little longer, " by The New York Times. In a 2017 editorial for Rotten Tomatoes, it was named one of the five favorite films of fictional character Lightning McQueen from Disney/Pixar's Cars franchise.

== Awards ==
- Tribeca Film Festival, Best Documentary (winner)
- Nashville Film Festival, Best Documentary (winner)
- Florida Film Festival, Audience Award for Best Documentary Feature (winner)
- Indianapolis Film Festival, Audience Award (winner)
- Chicago International Film Festival, Silver Hugo Award (winner)
- Jacksonville Film Festival, Best Documentary (winner)
