= Deutscher Morgen =

German language Brazilian newspaper

Deutscher Morgen (also known as Aurora Alemã in Portuguese, meaning "German Morning") was a German language Brazilian newspaper published between 16 March 1932 and December 1941. Self-proclaimed the "official paper of the Nazi Party in Brazil", it was the largest Nazi newspaper of that country. Installed in the neighborhood of Mooca, São Paulo during its early years and led by Hans Henning von Cossel, the Deutscher Morgen reported almost exclusively facts related to the Third Reich, disseminating statements made by Adolf Hitler and other exponents of the Nazi government.

The publication of the newspaper began in March 1932, a year before Hitler's rise to power. An article published at that time brought an antisemitic song in which Jews were described as golden pot-owning thieves of the exchange rate, traffickers and oppressors of the working people. In the lyrics, Hitler was described as the savior who would "wake" Germany up, breaking the chains that Jews imposed to the people and the country. During the Spanish Civil War, the newspaper featured a cover story blaming the Jewish people – described as "carriers of the red plague bacillus" – for the conflict.

In addition to spreading Nazism, the Deutscher Morgen reported what was happening in the Brazilian branch of the Nazi Party and published advertisements inviting readers to contribute financially with the Winterhilfswerk, a program which provided aid to the poorest sectors of the Aryan German society. An indication that much of the German community in Brazil was involved with the Nazi Party, even indirectly, was the great amount of ads in the newspaper. Tailor shops, jewellery stores, dental clinics, cafeterias, restaurants, bars, dry cleaners, bookstores, banks and breweries – such as Brahma and Antarctica – were faithful advertisers.

Gradually, the newspaper was harmed by the nationalization campaign carried out by the Vargas regime, which prohibited publications printed in other languages. Under pressure from the Department of Press and Propaganda (Departamento de Imprensa e Propaganda – DIP), the Deutscher Morgen started to be printed in Portuguese. In September 1941 the German title was removed from its cover. In November 1941 the newspaper, now published entirely in Portuguese, was renamed Aurora Ilustrada ("Dawn Illustrated"). Shortly after, the publication was completely extinguished; by December 1941 its circulation had ceased.
