= Fritz Julius Kuhn =

German Nazi activist (1896–1951)

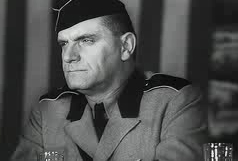
- Kuhn in 1938
- Born: May 15, 1896; Munich, Bavaria, German Empire
- Died: December 14, 1951 (aged 55); Munich, Bavaria, West Germany
- Citizenship: United States (1934–1943; revoked)
- Education: Technical University of Munich
- Occupation: Leader of the German American Bund
- Spouse: Elsa
- Children: 2
- Parents: Georg Kuhn; Julia Justyna Beuth
- Awards: Iron Cross (1st Class); The Honour Cross of the World War 1914/1918

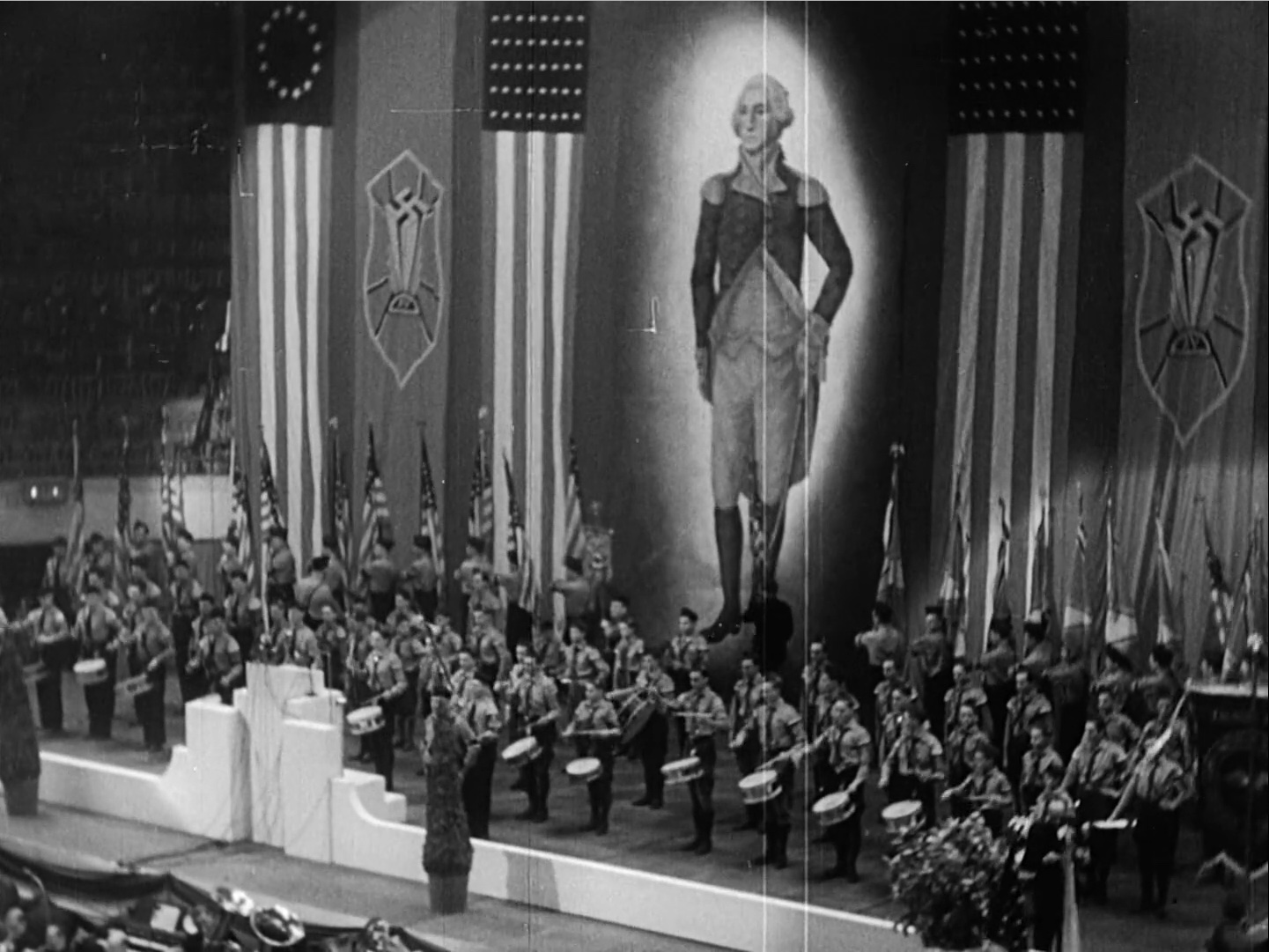
1939 Nazi rally at Madison Square Garden

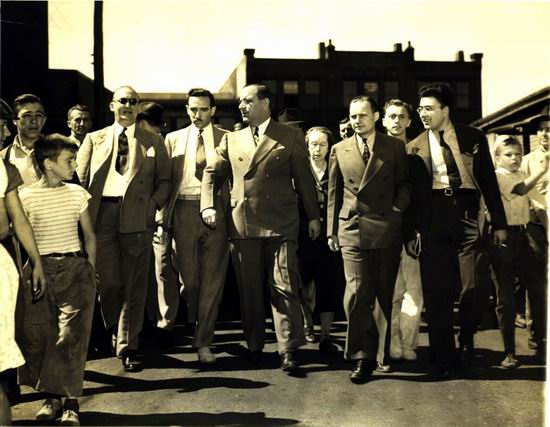
Kuhn appearing on the street after leaving a courthouse in Webster, Massachusetts, in 1939

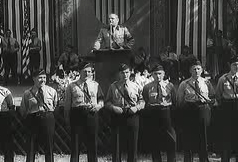
Kuhn speaking at a "Bund"-camp-rally

Fritz Julius Kuhn (May 15, 1896 – December 14, 1951) was a German Nazi activist who served as the elected leader of the German American Bund, a German-American Nazi organization active in the years before the United States entered World War II. He became a naturalized United States citizen in 1934, though his citizenship was revoked in 1943 owing to his status as a foreign agent of Nazi Germany. Kuhn served prison time for larceny and forgery from 1939 to 1943 and, upon release, the United States government immediately interned him as an enemy agent. He was deported in 1945 and later served further prison time in post-war Germany before dying in 1951.

== Early life and education ==
Kuhn was born in Munich, Germany, on May 15, 1896, the son of Georg Kuhn and Julia Justyna Beuth. During World War I, Kuhn earned an Iron Cross as a German infantry lieutenant. After the war, he joined one of the Freikorps that engaged in street battles against Communists and other left-wingers in Germany; and later graduated from the Technical University of Munich with a master's degree in chemical engineering.

In the 1920s, Kuhn moved to Mexico. In 1928 he moved to the United States, and in 1934, he became a naturalized citizen of the United States. He worked at a Ford factory in Detroit before assuming control of the German American Bund in Buffalo, New York, in 1936.

== Leadership of the German American Bund ==
A Congressional committee headed by Samuel Dickstein concluded that the Friends of New Germany supported a branch of German dictator Adolf Hitler's Nazi Party in the United States, and the Friends of New Germany disbanded. However, in March 1936, the German American Bund was established in Buffalo as a follow-up organization. The Bund elected the German-born American citizen Kuhn as its leader.

Kuhn, while describing the Bund as "sympathetic to the Hitler government", denied that the organization received money or took orders from the government of Germany. Kuhn also denied that the Bund had any agenda of introducing fascism to the United States.

Kuhn enlisted thousands of German Americans by using antisemitic, anticommunist, pro-German, and pro-American propaganda. One of his first tasks was planning a trip to Germany with 50 American followers. The purpose was to be in the presence of Hitler and to witness Nazism in practice personally.

At this time, Germany was preparing to host the 1936 Olympics. Kuhn anticipated a warm welcome from Adolf Hitler, but the encounter was disappointing. This did not stop Kuhn from fabricating propaganda to his followers once he returned to the United States about how Hitler acknowledged him as the "American Führer".

As his profile grew, so did the tension against him. Not only Jewish-Americans, but also German-Americans who did not want to be associated with Nazis protested against the Bund. These protests were occasionally violent, making the Bund front page news in the United States. In response to the outrage of Jewish war veterans, Congress in 1938 passed the Foreign Agents Registration Act requiring foreign agents to register with the State Department. Hitler needed to keep the U.S. neutral throughout the coming war and sought to avoid provoking Americans. In contrast, Kuhn was eager to stir media attention. On March 1, 1938, the Nazi government decreed that no German national (Reichsdeutsche) could be a member of the Bund and that no Nazi emblems were to be used by the organization.

Undaunted, on September 3, 1938, the Bund reelected Kuhn, and on February 20, 1939, Kuhn held the largest and most publicized rally in the Bund's history at Madison Square Garden in New York City. Some 20,000 people attended and heard Kuhn mock President Franklin D. Roosevelt as "Frank D. Rosenfeld", calling his New Deal the "Jew Deal" and denouncing what he called Bolshevik-Jewish American leadership. Kuhn also stated: "The Bund is fighting shoulder to shoulder with patriotic Americans to protect America from a race that is not the American race, that is not even a white race... The Jews are controlling everything and the white man is thrown out of his job.... The Jews are enemies of the United States.... All Jews are Communists.... Christ was not a Jew..." There was an outbreak of violence between Bund storm troopers and thousands of angry protesters in the streets. During Kuhn's speech, a Jewish protester, Isadore Greenbaum, rushed the stage and had to be rescued by police after he was beaten and stripped by stormtroopers.

== Criminal conviction ==
Later in 1939, seeking to cripple the Bund, New York City Mayor Fiorello La Guardia ordered the city to investigate the Bund's taxes. It alleged that Kuhn had embezzled $14,548 from the organization, spending part of the money on a mistress. District Attorney Thomas E. Dewey issued an indictment on May 25, 1939, and won a conviction against Kuhn. On December 5, 1939, Kuhn was sentenced to two and a half to five years in prison for larceny and forgery. The next day, he was sent to Sing Sing. Despite his convictions for embezzlement, followers of the Bund continued to hold Kuhn in high regard, in line with the Nazi Führerprinzip, which gives the leader absolute power.

In 1940, James Wheeler-Hill, the Secretary of the Bund, was sentenced to one to three years in prison after pleading guilty to perjury for falsely testifying that he was an American citizen at Kuhn's trial. Wheeler-Hill had been born in Latvia, and was never naturalized.

== Imprisonment and deportation ==
Kuhn's citizenship was revoked on June 1, 1943, while he was in Sing Sing prison, on the grounds of it having been obtained fraudulently as shown by his ongoing activity as a foreign agent of, and a person with loyalty including oaths of military service towards, Germany and the Nazi Party. Upon his release after 43 months in prison, Kuhn was re-arrested on June 21, 1943, as an enemy agent and interned by the federal government at a camp in Crystal City, Texas. Interned with Kuhn were his wife and 16-year-old son, who were deemed "enemy aliens". Kuhn's family had returned to Germany in 1938, but came back to support him for the trial. They were repatriated to Germany in an exchange in February 1944.

After the war, Kuhn, along with 714 other "unteachable Germans" was sent to Ellis Island and deported to Germany on September 15, 1945. Upon his return, he was interned at Hohenasperg Fortress. A CIC agent who interrogated Kuhn in January 1946 recommended his release, saying he was "discredited and spiritually broken." Kuhn wanted to return to the United States, but worked as an industrial chemist in a small chemical factory in Munich. The German authorities then decided that he could be tried under Germany's denazification laws, and he was imprisoned in July 1947.

== Last years in Germany ==
Kuhn was held in an internment camp at Dachau, awaiting trial before a Bavarian German de-Nazification court. He escaped on February 4, 1948, by promising a 32-year-old German civilian employee of the US armed forces that he would marry her. Nonetheless, Kuhn was tried in absentia in April 1948, and a jury found him guilty. He was sentenced to ten years in prison. The Associated Press reported that the trial was carried out entirely by the presentation of documents demonstrating Kuhn's close ties with Hitler's Third Reich and his attempts to transplant its ideology into the United States.

Kuhn was recaptured on June 15 in the French zone town of Bernkastel, near Trier. After an investigation into how he had escaped, the camp director, Anton Zirngibl, was fired. Kuhn told reporters, "The door was open so I went through." Kuhn said on June 17 that he considered the ten-year sentence as a "major Nazi offender" unfair and that he intended to appeal.

In 1949, an appellate court reduced Kuhn's sentence to two years of hard labor. He was released on February 22, 1949. While in prison, Kuhn reportedly sent a message to columnist Walter Winchell, who had helped lead media counterattacks against the Bund back in New York City. It read: "Tell Herr Vinchell, I will lift to piss on his grafe [sic]." Winchell died in 1972, outliving the Nazi activist by 21 years.

== Death ==
Kuhn died of unknown causes on December 14, 1951, in Munich, Germany. His obituary in The New York Times said that he died "a poor and obscure chemist, unheralded and unsung." Shortly before his death, Kuhn was asked why he had followed Hitler. Disillusioned by the collapse of Nazi Germany, he replied, "Who would have known it would end like this?"

== See also ==
- A Night at the Garden - documentary short of February 1939 Nazi rally at Madison Square Garden in New York City
