= Why Wal-Mart Works; and Why That Drives Some People C-R-A-Z-Y =

- Directed by: Ron Galloway
- Release date: 2005
- Country: United States
- Language: English

Why Wal-Mart Works; and Why That Drives Some People C-R-A-Z-Y is a 2005 independent documentary film by Ron and Robert David Galloway. It investigates the reasons behind the financial success of the Walmart Corporation. The documentary suggests that many criticisms of Walmart arise from feelings of jealousy over the company's success.

The documentary Wal-Mart: The High Cost of Low Price was released on the same day as Why Wal-Mart Works.

Director Ron Galloway was quoted as saying, "I started making my film with no agenda, with no set outcome in mind. With the $85,000 of our own money my brother Robert and I spent to make my film, I couldn't afford an agenda. Why Wal-Mart Works positive tone is solely a product of my experience making it. My brother and I made Why Wal-Mart Works with almost no cooperation from Walmart. I say 'almost' because Walmart—after several failed attempts—did finally allow me into their stores and to interview some of their associates. They had no editorial oversight and I solicited no input from them. They're not even going to sell my movie in their stores!"

== Criticism ==
The documentary has been criticized for being biased and for its amateur production values. Ron Galloway later turned against the Walmart company, following the implementation of wage caps for some workers.
