= Fascist League of North America =

Group of fascist organizations in the United States

- Lega Fascista del Nord America
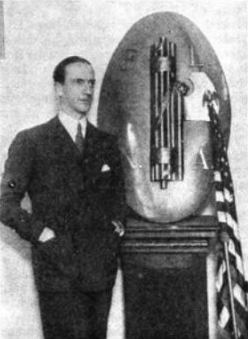
- Paolo Thaon di Revel with FLNA shield
- Abbreviation: FLNA
- Formation: 1924; 102 years ago
- Founder: Paolo Ignazio Maria Thaon di Revel (1888–1973)
- Founded at: New York City, NY, USA
- Dissolved: 1929; 97 years ago
- Type: Political pressure group
- Legal status: Defunct
- Purpose: Italian fascist propaganda
- Headquarters: Boston, MA, USA
- Key people: Theon di Revel; Generoso Pope; Giacomo De Martino
- Affiliations: Tammany Hall (organization); Il Progresso Italo-Americano (newspaper)

The Fascist League of North America (FLNA) was an umbrella group for fascist Italian-American organizations founded in 1924. With the rise of fascism in Italy, grassroots Fasci clubs started to form in Italian-American communities in the United States. Despite hostility from Italian diplomatic officialdom, who saw such a move as counterproductive, nearly forty such groups had been organized by mid-1923. In 1924, the groups came together under the umbrella of the FLNA.

During the early years of Benito Mussolini's rule, when the fascist dictatorship had not yet been consolidated and there were still outstanding diplomatic questions between the United States and Italy regarding war debts and emigration, the Italian National Fascist Party did not seek an official connection with the American fascists. But by the mid-to late 1920s, the party decided to extend its suzerainty over the foreign fascist groups through the Fasci Italiani all'Estero, or Fascists Abroad organization. Paolo Ignazio Maria Thaon di Revel was sent to the US to organize the Fasci into the FLNA.

Despite the continuing hostility of the Italian diplomatic corps, the FLNA had the support of fascist ideologues on both sides of the Atlantic. In the United States it could count in particular on the support of two Italian-American newspapers, Domenico Trombetta's Il Grido della Stirpe in New York and Francesco Macaluso's Giovinezza in Boston. The United States Department of State was ambivalent, initially viewing the FLNA as a group committed to law and order and anti-communism, and seeing no reason to ask for its disestablishment despite the Italian ambassador's offer to do so.

The presence of the FLNA provoked a counter-response by Italian-Americans of liberal, socialist, communist and anarchist persuasion, and an Anti-Fascist Alliance of North America was formed as early as 1923 and continued into the 1930s. Clashes between pro- and anti-fascist Italian-Americans became more common, ending in at least a dozen fatalities evenly divided between the two factions.

The final death knell was a sensationalistic article published in November 1929, by Harper's Magazine, "Mussolini's American empire" by Marcus Duffield claiming the FLNA was part of Mussolini's plot to control the Italian-American community in the United States and raise "soldiers for Fascism". The Italian government concluded that the American Fasci did Italy more harm than good. Mussolini instructed Ambassador de Martino to dissolve the FLNA, using the public outcry as a pretext.

== See also ==
- German-American Bund
