= A Night at the Garden =

2017 short documentary film by Marshall Curry

- Film poster
- Directed by: Marshall Curry
- Written by: Marshall Curry
- Produced by: Marshall Curry
- Edited by: Marshall Curry
- Music by: James Baxter
- Production companies: Marshall Curry Productions LLC; First Look Media
- Distributed by: Field of Vision
- Release dates: 2017 (online); January 26, 2018 (Sundance)
- Running time: 7 minutes
- Country: United States
- Language: English

A Night at the Garden is a 2017 short documentary film about the 1939 Nazi rally at Madison Square Garden in New York City. The film was directed by Marshall Curry from footage found by archival producer Rich Remsberg, and was produced by Laura Poitras and Charlotte Cook with Field of Vision. The seven-minute film is composed entirely of archival footage and features a speech from Fritz Julius Kuhn, the leader of the German American Bund, in which antisemitic and pro white-Christian sentiments are espoused.

== Synopsis ==
The film uses black and white footage from the 1939 Nazi rally at Madison Square Garden from Monday, February 20, 1939. It opens outside Madison Square Garden with shots of the New York City Police Department reining in anti-Nazi counter-protesters along with a marquee that lists a "pro-American rally" scheduled on that night, above a National Hockey League match and a college basketball game later in the week. After a procession of flag bearers to a stage decorated with swastika-adorned pennants, U.S. flags, and a portrait of George Washington, a German-accented man leads the audience in the Pledge of Allegiance. It is Fritz Julius Kuhn, the leader of the German American Bund. He steps up to the podium and casually remarks about how he is depicted as a "creature with horns, a cloven hoof, and long tail" by "the Jewish-controlled press."

As he begins to outline a program calling for a "socially-just, white, Gentile-controlled United States" and "Gentile-controlled labor unions, free from Jewish Moscow-directed domination," a counter-protester rushes on stage in an attempt to attack Kuhn. It is 26 year old Isadore Greenbaum. He is beaten onstage by the Bund's paramilitaries, and as he is hauled away by the police the footage is slowed to focus on him.

The footage ends with a rendition of "The Star-Spangled Banner" by a German-accented woman, before cutting to a title card noting that the rally occurred when Adolf Hitler was overseeing construction of Nazi Germany's sixth concentration camp and seven months before its invasion of Poland and the beginning of World War II.

== Background ==
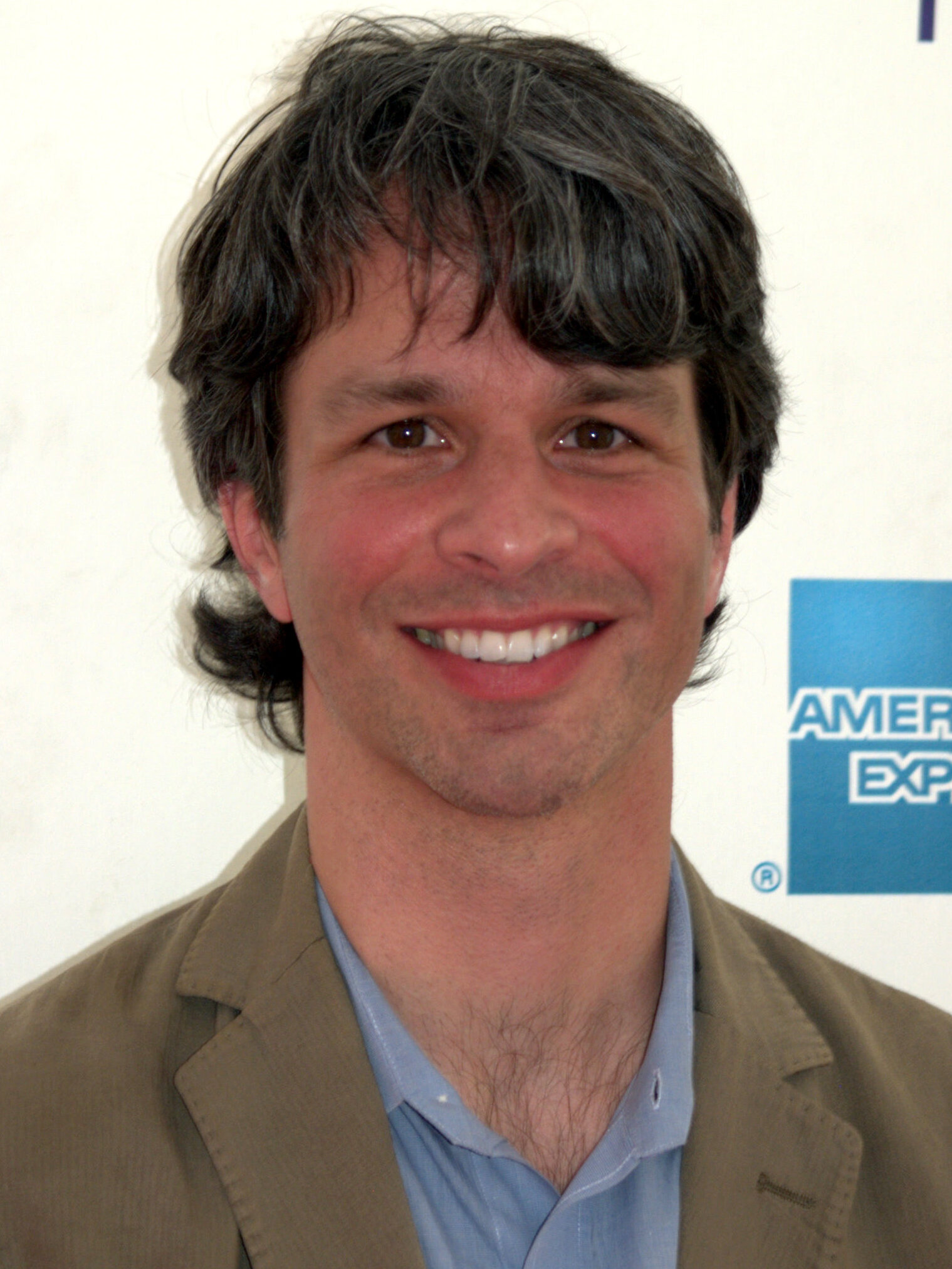
Director Marshall Curry in 2009

The documentary was produced using footage of the rally originally intended for newsreels that had never been widely issued due to its controversial content. Many film exhibitors avoided footage of Hitler and Nazism due to strongly negative reactions and even disorderly conduct from audiences. News of the Day never released its footage, while RKO-Pathé News quickly withdrew a newsreel incorporating the footage after deeming it "too inflammatory." As a result, the rally was widely forgotten after the end of World War II. After viewing the footage and expressing surprise at the event's obscurity, Curry was inspired to produce the documentary by the rise of the alt-right in the United States and the 2017 Unite the Right rally in Charlottesville, Virginia. The footage was retrieved and edited from the National Archives, the Grinberg Film Library, Streamline Films, and the UCLA Film and Television Archive.

== Release and reception ==
A Night at the Garden premiered at the Sundance Film Festival in 2018 and was nominated at the 91st Academy Awards for Best Documentary Short.
