= Fascism in the United States =

Flag of U.S. neo-fascist organization Patriot Front, combining elements of the U.S. flag with the fasces, the traditional fascist symbol from which the term fascism was derived.

In the United States, the history of fascism dates back over a century, with roots in the history of white supremacy, white nationalism, nativism, xenophobia, and far-right political violence. It has received less scholarly attention than fascism in Europe, particularly Nazi Germany and Fascist Italy. Scholars say that far-right authoritarian movements have been a part of the political landscape of the United States for a very long period of time.

Contributors to Fascism in America: Past and Present have traced the roots of fascism in the United States back to the origins of late 19th and early 20th-century movements such as the Ku Klux Klan and various domestic proto-fascist organizations that emerged during the Great Depression. Alongside homegrown movements, German-backed political organizations attempted to make U.S. public opinion sympathetic toward Nazi cause during World War II. After the U.S.'s formal declaration of war against Germany, the U.S. Treasury Department raided the German American Bund's headquarters and arrested its leaders. Both during and after World War II, Italian anti-fascist activists and other anti-fascist groups played a role in confronting advocates of these ideologies. The ideologies which are espoused by American fascist organizations include Christian fascism ( a form of clerical fascism), Christian Identity, Christian nationalism, Christian supremacy, homophobia, antisemitism, Nazism and racism.

Events such as the 2017 Charlottesville rally have demonstrated the persistence of racism, antisemitism, and white supremacy within U.S. society. The resurgence of fascist rhetoric in contemporary U.S. politics, particularly under the administration of President Donald Trump, has highlighted the endurance of far-right ideologies, and it has also rekindled debate about the history of fascism in the United States.

== Early origins ==
The origins of fascism in the United States date back to the 19th century with roots in slavery in the Antebellum South and the Confederate States of America, the subsequent passage of Black Codes and Jim Crow laws in the American South, the rise of the eugenics movement in the U.S., and the intensification of nativist and xenophobic hostility toward immigrants. During the early 20th century, several groups that have been classified as fascist organizations by contemporary historians were formed in the United States—a prominent organization is the Ku Klux Klan.

=== Early proto-fascist movements ===
While it is impossible to classify early nativist movements in the United States, such as the Native American Party of 1845 and the Know Nothings, as being outright fascist because their existence predated the invention of the term fascism by decades, many of their beliefs were strongly aligned with the tenets of fascism. The Know Nothings glorified the Protestant Anglo-Saxon cultural, racial, and religious identity of the United States, which they believed was under attack by the mass influx of immigrants who were different from them. In accordance with their nativist policies, mainly defined by an us–versus–them mentality, the Know Nothings demonized Catholics and immigrants, and they also called for their removal from both the public and professional spheres. Furthermore, the Know Nothing movement's heavy-handed approach to intimidation, often through the use of violence, mirrored the methods which fascists would employ in the future.

=== Ku Klux Klan ===
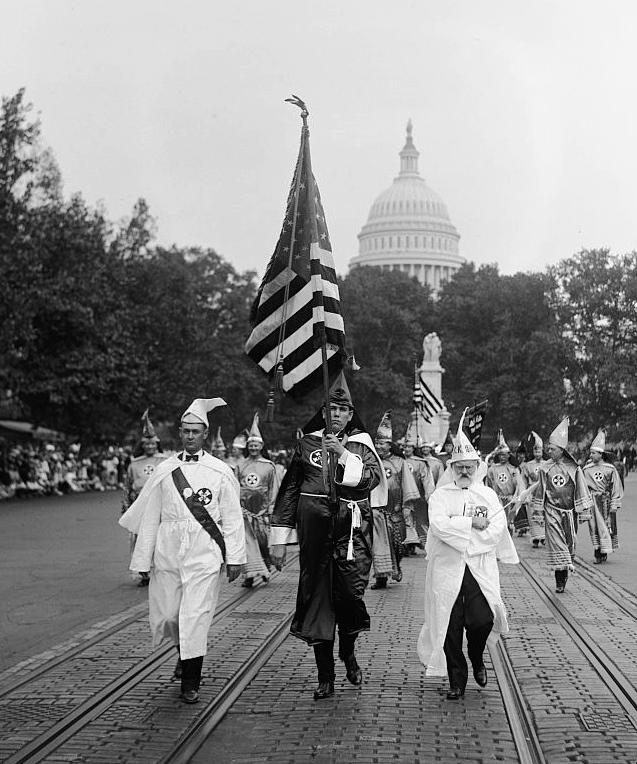
Ku Klux Klan parade in Washington, D.C., September 13, 1926

The Ku Klux Klan (KKK), commonly known as "the Klan", is an American white supremacist and far-right extremist organization which was founded in 1865 during the post-Civil War Reconstruction era in the American South.

Scholars have characterized the Klan as America's first terrorist group, comparing its emergence to the rise of fascist trends in Europe. Historian Peter Amann argued that "Undeniably, the Klan had some traits in common with European fascism—chauvinism, racism, a mystique of violence, an affirmation of a certain kind of archaic traditionalism—yet their differences were fundamental. ... [The KKK] never envisioned a change of political or economic system."

The first Klan, founded by Confederate veterans, assaulted and murdered politically active Black people and their white political allies in the Southern United States. The second Klan was formed in 1915 as a small group in Georgia and it flourished nationwide by the mid-1920s.

== Interwar period ==
While the rise of fascism in Europe during the interwar period raised concerns, European fascist regimes were largely viewed positively by the American ruling class. This was because fascist interpretations of ultranationalism allowed a nation to gain a significant amount of economic influence in the Western world and permitted a nation's government to destroy leftists and labor movements.

=== Supporters of Italian fascism ===
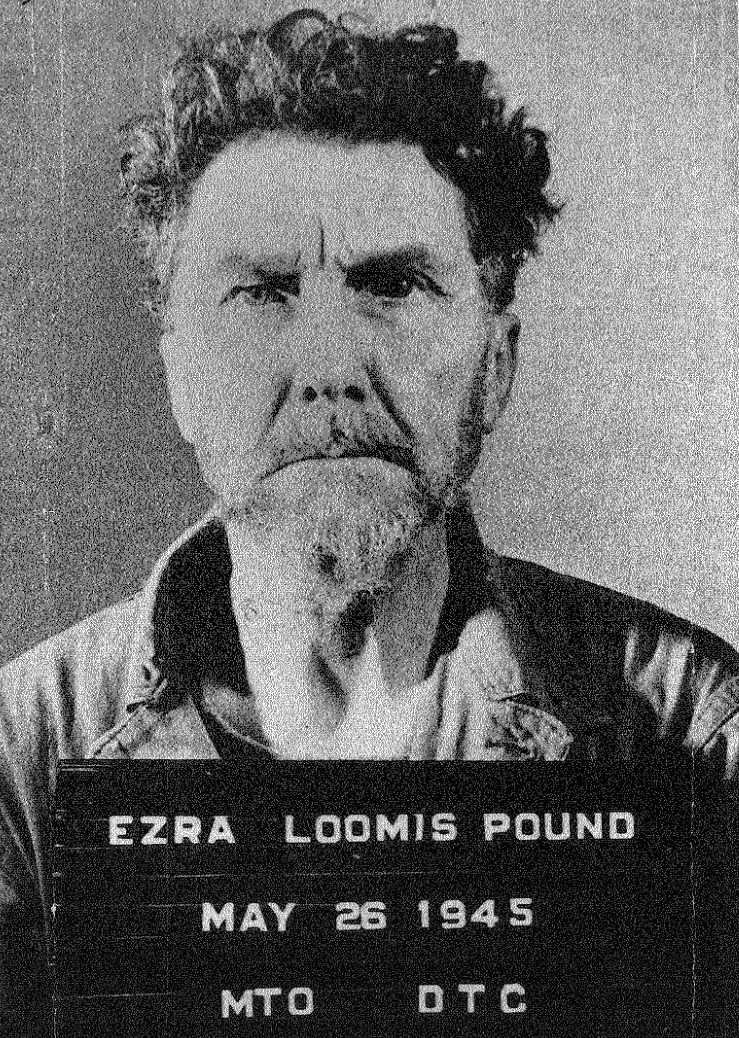
Poet Ezra Pound in prison (1945)

During the 1920s, American scholars frequently wrote about the rise of Italian fascism under Benito Mussolini, but few of them supported it. Mussolini's fascist policies initially gained widespread support among Italian Americans.

William Phillips, the American ambassador to Italy, was "greatly impressed by the efforts of Benito Mussolini to improve the conditions of the masses" and found "much evidence" in support of the fascist argument that "they represent a true democracy in as much as the welfare of the people is their principal objective."

Phillips found Mussolini's achievements "astounding [and] a source of constant amazement" and greatly admired his "great human qualities." United States Department of State officials enthusiastically agreed with Phillips's assessment, praising Italian fascism for having "brought order out of chaos, discipline out of license, and solvency out of bankruptcy," as well as Mussolini's "magnificent" achievements in Ethiopia during the Second Italo-Ethiopian War.

The American poet Ezra Pound moved from the United States to Italy in 1924, becoming a loyal supporter of Benito Mussolini. He wrote articles and produced radio broadcasts critical of the United States, international bankers, Franklin Roosevelt, and the Jews. His propaganda was poorly received in the U.S.

In November 1925, the Order Sons of Italy in America helped organize the first U.S. fascist convention in Philadelphia. The goal of the convention was "setting up Fascist infiltration into political organizations and mutual aid societies so as to create friendly ties and spiritual agreement". After World War II, the organization faced criticism for the "heavy involvement by the OSIA in Mussolini's Fascist propaganda campaign in the 1920s and 1930s".

=== American Legion ===
According to historian William Pencak:

Veterans and their role in American society were extremely controversial in the twenties and thirties, both because of actual issues such as the Bonus or veterans’ support for defense expenditures, but also because critics saw in the American Legion a mirror of the powerful fascist movements in Europe, such as the Nazis in Germany and Fascists in Italy. The comparison reflected fear more than rationality: the Legion had no need or desire to overthrow the government. It was able to achieve nearly all its goals through traditional political channels and strongly supported constitutional authority. Its members did not wear military uniforms (only the familiar caps), elected its officers through democratic means—although as in all associations, an active elite ran the show—and had black, Catholic, and Jewish members. It boasted of Jewish national chaplains and Catholic national commanders. . . .The Legion’s anti-radical program was typical of conservatives throughout American history, who . . . rarely concerned themselves with the rights of union organizers or socialist ‘‘agitators’’ despite the formal constitutional protections.

While one would be remiss to paint the contemporary American Legion as a bastion of fascism, its early history showed individual leaders who saw a similarity with early fascist movements. Initially founded in Paris in 1919 by American soldiers who were returning to the United States after the First World War, it became an advocacy group which lobbied on behalf of veterans.

In 1922, the year Mussolini became prime minister in Italy—but before he became a dictator—, Alvin Owsley, the National Commander of the American Legion, stated that the Legion was a staunch opponent of communist and socialist movements. While claiming that he was defending American values such as liberty and freedom, Owsley also stated that, "Should the day ever come when they menace the freedom of our representative government, the Legion would not hesitate to take things into its own hands—to fight the 'reds' as the Fascisti of Italy fought them." While the statement itself does not declare the Legion as outright fascist, his subsequent comment that, " …the Fascisti are to Italy what the American Legion is to the United States. And that Mussolini, the new premier, was the commander of the Legion—the ex-servicemen of Italy…" served as an endorsement and unofficial outreach to Mussolini.

Years later, Commander John McQuigg (1925–26) stated, "The Fascisti are the Legionnaires of Italy. Their aims and ideals, though not their methods, are identical". These comments could be dismissed as overly enthusiastic personal opinions of a few prominent individuals within the Legion. However the American Legion did extend several invitations to Mussolini to address its conventions.

The American Legion was unable to receive support from Mussolini. It enticed the Italian government to send Ambassador Giacomo De Martino to represent Italy at a Legion convention in 1931, where the National Executive passed a resolution in which it conveyed its support of Mussolini’s policies. Its national vice commander, Colonel William Esterwood, visited Italy to bestow an honorary American Legion membership upon him in 1935. By this point fascism’s initial allure had begun to wane, and this move by the Legion proved unpopular with many members, leading to the Legion's cancellation of the membership. By the mid-1930s the American Legion rejected any support of fascist regimes.

=== Black Legion ===
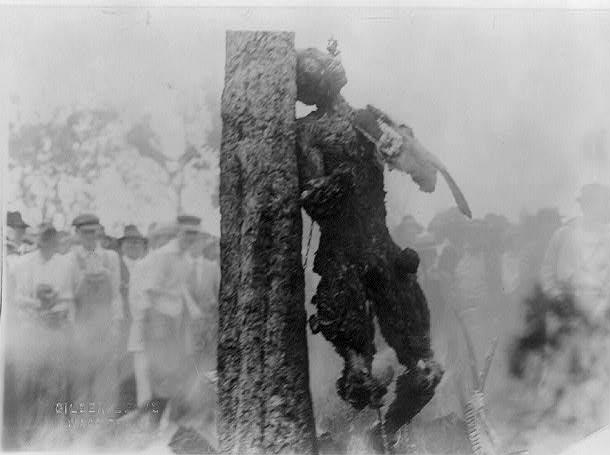
A crowd observes the burned corpse of lynching victim Jesse Washington

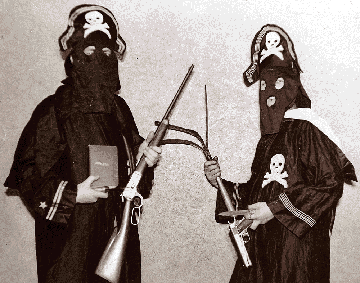
Police pose with uniforms and weapons taken from arrested Black Legionnaires

In 1925, Virgil Effinger established the paramilitary Black Legion, a violent white supremacist offshoot of the KKK that sought to establish fascism in the United States by launching a revolution against the federal government. The Black Legion was active in the Midwest in the 1920s and 1930s, growing to prominence during the Great Depression. The FBI estimated its membership numbered "135,000, including a large number of public officials, including Detroit's police chief." Historians have suggested lower estimates.

The Black Legion is widely viewed as having been an even more violent and radical offshoot of the Klan. In 1936, the group was suspected of having killed as many as 50 people, according to the Associated Press, including Charles Poole, an organizer for the federal Works Progress Administration. Eleven men were found guilty of Poole's murder. The Associated Press described the organization as "a group of loosely federated night-riding bands operating in several States without central discipline or common purpose beyond the enforcement by lash and pistol of individual leaders' notions of 'Americanism.'" Nearly 50 Legionnaires were ultimately convicted of murder, conspiracy to commit murder, kidnapping, arson, and perjury. Although it was responsible for numerous attacks, the Black Legion remained limited in size and ultimately petered out.

=== Father Charles Coughlin ===
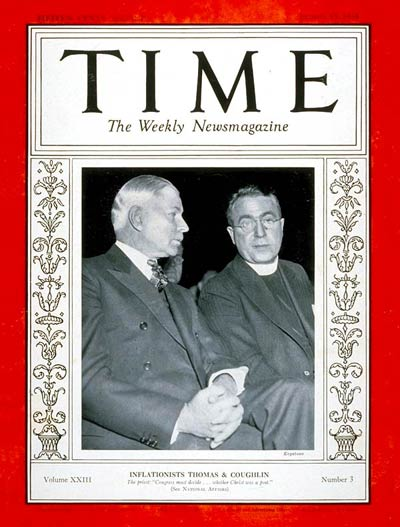
Father Charles Coughlin (right) on the cover of Time magazine (1934)

Father Charles Coughlin was a Roman Catholic priest who hosted a prominent radio program in the late 1930s, on which he often ventured into politics. In 1932, he backed and welcomed the election of President Franklin Roosevelt, but the two had a falling out after 1934. His radio program and his newspaper, Social Justice, denounced Roosevelt, as well as the "big banks" and "the Jews." When the United States entered World War II, the U.S. government took his radio broadcasts off the air and blocked his newspaper from the mail. He abandoned politics but remained a parish priest until he died in 1979.

The American architect-to-be Philip Johnson was a correspondent in Germany for Coughlin's newspaper between 1934 and 1940, before beginning his architectural career. He wrote articles that were favorable to the Nazis and critical of "the Jews," as well as taking part in a Nazi-sponsored press tour, in which he covered the 1939 Nazi invasion of Poland. He quit the newspaper in 1940, was investigated by the FBI, and was cleared for army service in World War II. Years later, he would refer to these activities as "the stupidest thing^{[sic]} I ever did ... [which] I never can atone for."

=== Rise of Hitler ===
Adolf Hitler became chancellor of Germany on January 30, 1933. In the years that followed, before the outbreak of World War II, some German-Americans attempted to create pro-Nazi movements in the U.S., often bearing swastikas and wearing uniforms. These groups had little to do with Nazi Germany, and they lacked support from the wider German-American community.

Across the U.S., so many small groups sprang up wearing uniforms and identifying as fascist that in 1934, the American Civil Liberties Union released a pamphlet titled "Shirts! A Survey of the New 'Shirt' Organizations in the United States Seeking a Fascist Dictatorship" detailing the gold, silver, brown, black, gray, white, and blue-colored shirt liveries of the different emergent fascist groups.

In May 1933, Heinz Spanknöbel, a German immigrant to America, received authority from Rudolf Hess, the deputy führer of Germany, to form an official American branch of the Nazi Party. The branch was known as the Friends of New Germany in the U.S. The Nazi Party referred to it as the National Socialist German Workers' Party of the U.S.A. Though the party had a strong presence in Chicago, it remained based in New York City, having received support from the German consul in the city. Spanknöbel's organization was openly pro-Nazi. Members stormed the German-language newspaper New Yorker Staats-Zeitung and demanded that the paper publish articles sympathetic to Nazis. Spanknöbel's leadership was short-lived, as he was deported in October 1933 following revelations that he had not registered as a foreign agent.

Some American corporations had branches in neutral countries that traded with Germany after the U.S. declared war in late 1941.

=== German American Bund ===
Flag of the German American Bund (1936)

The German American Bund was the most prominent and well-organized fascist organization in the United States. It was founded in 1936, following the model of Hitler's Nazi Germany. It appeared shortly after the founding of several smaller groups, including the Friends of New Germany and the Silver Legion of America, founded in 1933 by William Dudley Pelley and the Free Society of Teutonia. The Friends of New Germany dissolved in December 1935 when Hess ordered all German citizens to leave the group after realizing that the organization was not beneficial to advancing their cause.

The German American Bund, led by Fritz Kuhn, was formed in 1936 and lasted until America formally entered World War II in 1941. The Bund existed with the goal of a united America under ethnic German rule and following Nazi ideology. It proclaimed communism as its main enemy and expressed antisemitic attitudes. After March 1, 1938, membership in the German-American Bund was only open to American citizens of German descent. Its main goal was to promote a favorable view of Nazi Germany. The Bund was active, providing its members with uniforms and encouraging participation in "training camps."

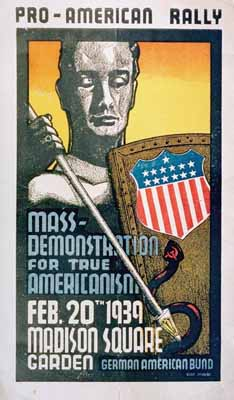
Poster for Bund rally at Madison Square Garden (1939)

Inspired by the Hitler Youth, the Bund created its youth division, where members "took German lessons, received instructions on how to salute the swastika, and learned to sing the 'Horst Wessel Lied' and other Nazi songs." The Bund continued to justify and glorify Hitler and his movements in Europe during the outbreak of World War II. After Germany invaded Poland in 1939, Bund leaders released a statement demanding that America stay neutral in the ensuing conflict and expressed sympathy for Germany's war effort. The Bund reasoned that this support for the German war effort was not disloyal to the United States, as German-Americans would "continue to fight for a Gentile America free of all atheistic Jewish Marxist elements."

The Bund held rallies with Nazi insignia and procedures such as the Hitler salute. Its leaders denounced the administration of President Franklin D. Roosevelt, Jewish-American groups, communism, "Moscow-directed" trade unions, and American boycotts of German goods. They claimed that George Washington was "the first Fascist" because he did not believe that democracy would work.

The high point of the Bund's activities was their rally at Madison Square Garden in New York City on February 20, 1939, with around 20,000 people in attendance. The antisemitic speakers repeatedly referred to President Roosevelt as "Frank D. Rosenfeld," calling his New Deal the "Jew Deal," as well as denouncing the supposed Bolshevik-Jewish American leadership. The rally ended with violence between protesters and the Bund's "storm-troopers." In 1939, America's top fascist, the Bund's leader Fritz Julius Kuhn, was investigated by the city of New York and was found to be embezzling the Bund's funds for his personal use. He was arrested, his citizenship was revoked, and he was deported.

In 1940, the German American Bund opposed the newly enacted peacetime draft and advised members to resist military service. The Bund was subsequently investigated and prosecuted for various activities, and it disbanded after the United States entered World War II in December 1941.

After many internal and leadership disputes, the Bund's executive committee agreed to disband the party on December 8, 1941, the day after the attack on Pearl Harbor. On December 11, 1941, the United States formally declared war on Germany, and Treasury Department agents raided Bund headquarters. The agents seized all records and arrested 76 Bund leaders.

== World War II ==
Canada and the United States battled the Axis powers during World War II. As part of the war effort, they suppressed the fascist movements within their borders, which were already weakened by the widespread public perception that they were fifth columns. This suppression consisted of the internment of fascist leaders, the disbanding of fascist organizations, the censorship of fascist propaganda, and pervasive government propaganda against fascism. In the U.S., this campaign of suppression culminated in "The Great Sedition Trial" of November 1944, in which George Sylvester Viereck, Lawrence Dennis, Elizabeth Dilling, William Dudley Pelley, Joe McWilliams, Robert Edward Edmondson, Gerald Winrod, William Griffin, and, in absentia, Ulrich Fleischhauer were all put on trial for aiding the Nazi cause, supporting fascism and isolationism. However, after the judge's death, a mistrial was declared, and all charges were dropped.

== Post-World War II ==
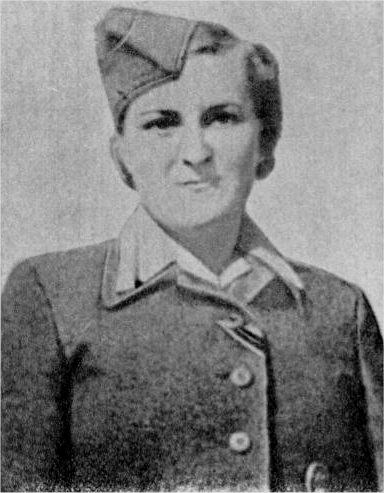
Hermine Braunsteiner, the first Nazi war criminal to be extradited from the United States, pictured during her time in the SS

In the 1980s, the Office of Special Investigations estimated around ten thousand Nazi war criminals entered the United States from Eastern Europe after the conclusion of World War II, although the number has since been determined to have been much smaller.

Some were brought in Operation Paperclip, a project to bring German scientists and engineers to the U.S. Most Nazi collaborators entered the United States through the 1948 and 1950 Displaced Persons Acts and the Refugee Relief Act of 1953. Supporters of the acts exhibited only slight awareness that Nazi war criminals would exploit the legislation to enter the United States. Most of the supporters' concern was about disallowing known communists from entering. Similarly, after the defeat of Nazi Germany in World War II, the global focus shifted from fascism to communism as the next perceived ideological threat. The pressures of the Cold War in the years after World War II, when the United States focused on countering Soviet communism rather than Nazism, contributed to this shift in focus. The totalitarian nature of Nazism had already demonstrated how dangerous centralized, authoritarian regimes could be. As the Soviet Union expanded its influence across Eastern Europe and supported communist movements worldwide, many Americans began to fear a similar form of totalitarianism taking root at home. This anxiety was intensified by events such as the Soviet Union's successful atomic bomb test in 1949 and the communist revolution in China. These developments, combined with revelations of Soviet espionage in the U.S., fueled widespread suspicion and led to the Second Red Scare, during which government officials, educators, and entertainers were investigated for alleged communist ties.

During the 1950s, the Immigration and Naturalization Service conducted several investigations into suspected Nazi war criminals. No official trials came from these investigations. The Holocaust and the possibility of Nazi collaborators living in the country entered the national discussion in the 1960s with the trial of Adolf Eichmann, accusations of war criminals during Soviet war crimes trials, and a series of articles published by Charles R. Allen detailing the presence of Nazi war criminals living in the U.S. The federal government began to focus on uncovering Nazi war criminals remaining in the country.

Public awareness of the Holocaust and remaining Nazi war criminals increased in the 1970s. Many cases made headline news. The case of Hermine Braunsteiner, the first Nazi war criminal to be extradited from the United States, received widespread media coverage. The case triggered the Immigration and Naturalization Service to locate Nazi collaborators further. By the late 1970s, INS addressed thousands of cases, and the U.S. government formed the Office of Special Investigations, which was dedicated to locating Nazi war criminals in the United States.

== Neo-Nazism ==
Neo-Nazism began to emerge as an ideology in the 1970s, seeking to revive and implement Nazi ideology. In the United States, organizations such as the American Nazi Party, the National Alliance, and White Aryan Resistance were formed during the second half of the 20th century. While initially composed of distinctive movements, in the 21st century, many U.S. neo-Nazi groups have moved toward more decentralized organization and online social networks with a terroristic focus.

=== American Nazi Party ===
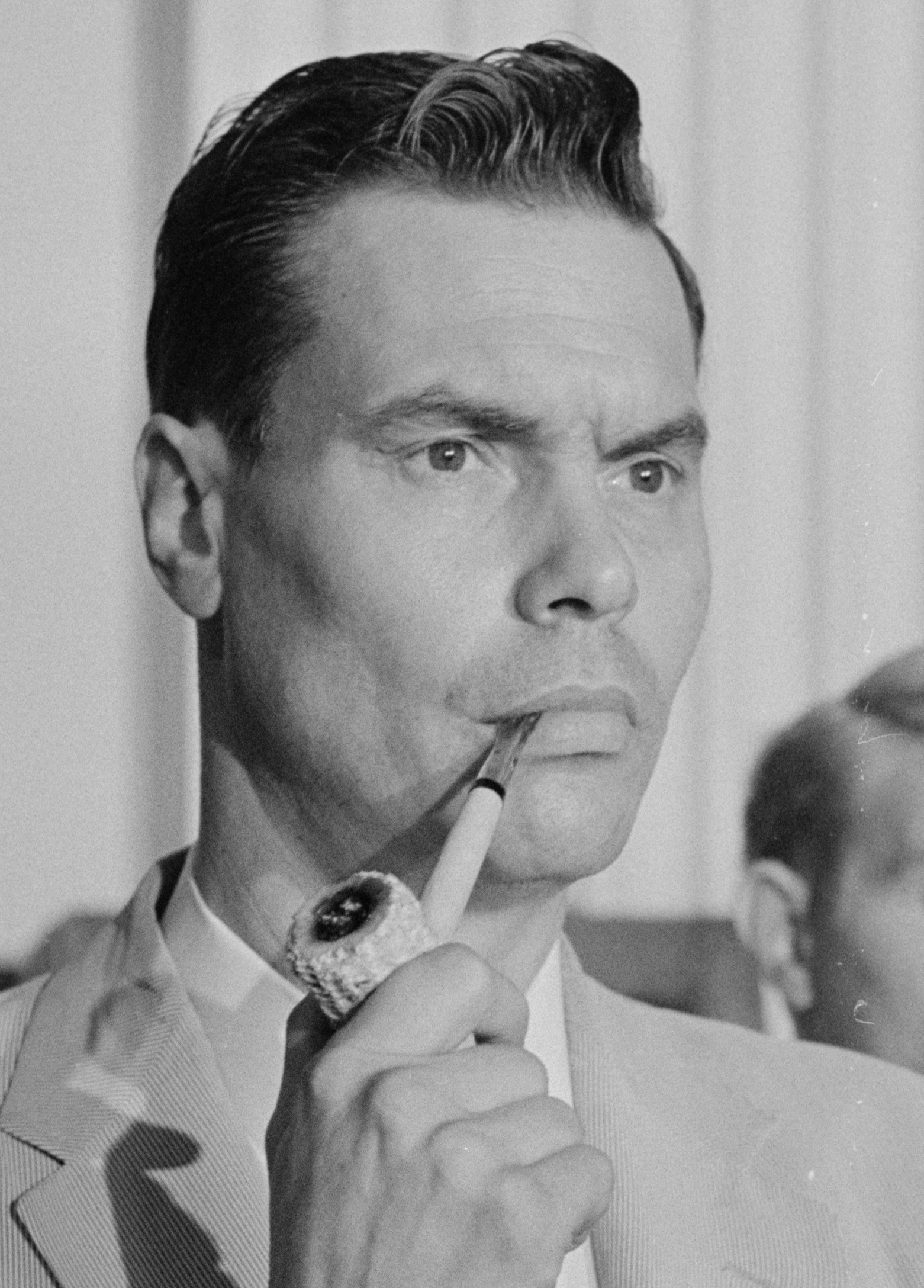
George Lincoln Rockwell, founder of the American Nazi Party, at a hearing of the House Un-American Activities Committee in 1963

In 1959, the American Nazi Party was founded by George Lincoln Rockwell, a former U.S. Navy commander, who was dismissed from the Navy due to his espousal of fascist political views.

Headquartered in Arlington, Virginia, the organization was initially named the World Union of Free Enterprise National Socialists, intended to denote opposition to state ownership of property. The same year, it was renamed the American Nazi Party to attract "maximum media attention."

The party was based primarily upon the ideals and policies of Adolf Hitler's Nazi Party in Germany during the Nazi era and embraced its uniforms and iconography. Since the late 1960s, several small groups had used the name "American Nazi Party," with most being independent of each other and disbanding before the 21st century. (Note: Despite sharing ideological roots, the phrase 'American Nazi Party' should not be conflated with the German American Bund or German American Federation (German: Amerikadeutscher Bund; Amerikadeutscher Volksbund, AV), which was an American Nazi organization established in 1936 to succeed Friends of New Germany (FONG), the new name being chosen to emphasize the group's American credentials after press criticism that the organization was unpatriotic. The Bund was to consist only of American citizens of German descent. Reportedly, it had about 20,000 adherents.)

On August 25, 1967, Rockwell was shot and killed in Arlington by John Patler, a former party member who Rockwell had previously expelled due to his espousal of his alleged "Bolshevik leanings." The party was dissolved in 1983.

=== National Alliance ===
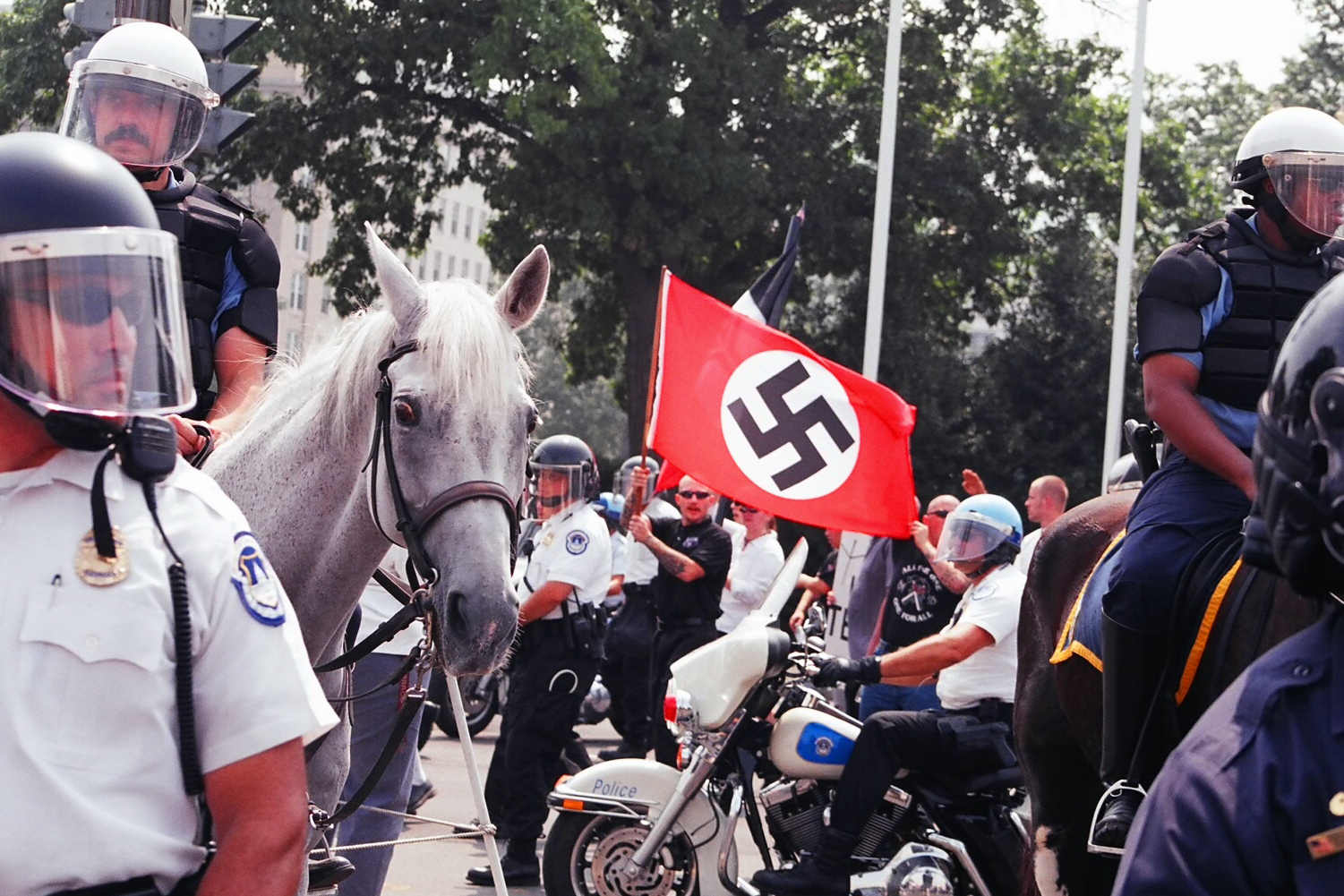
A National Alliance member with a Nazi flag at a rally in Washington, D.C., August 2002

The National Alliance was a neo-Nazi, white supremacist political organization founded by William Luther Pierce, author of The Turner Diaries, in 1974 and based in Mill Point, West Virginia. It was the largest and most active neo-Nazi group in the United States in the 1990s.

Its membership declined after Pierce died in 2002, and after a split in its ranks in 2005, it largely became defunct. According to the Southern Poverty Law Center, the National Alliance had lost most of its members by 2020 but is still visible in the U.S. Other groups, such as Atomwaffen Division, have taken its place.

=== National Socialist Movement ===
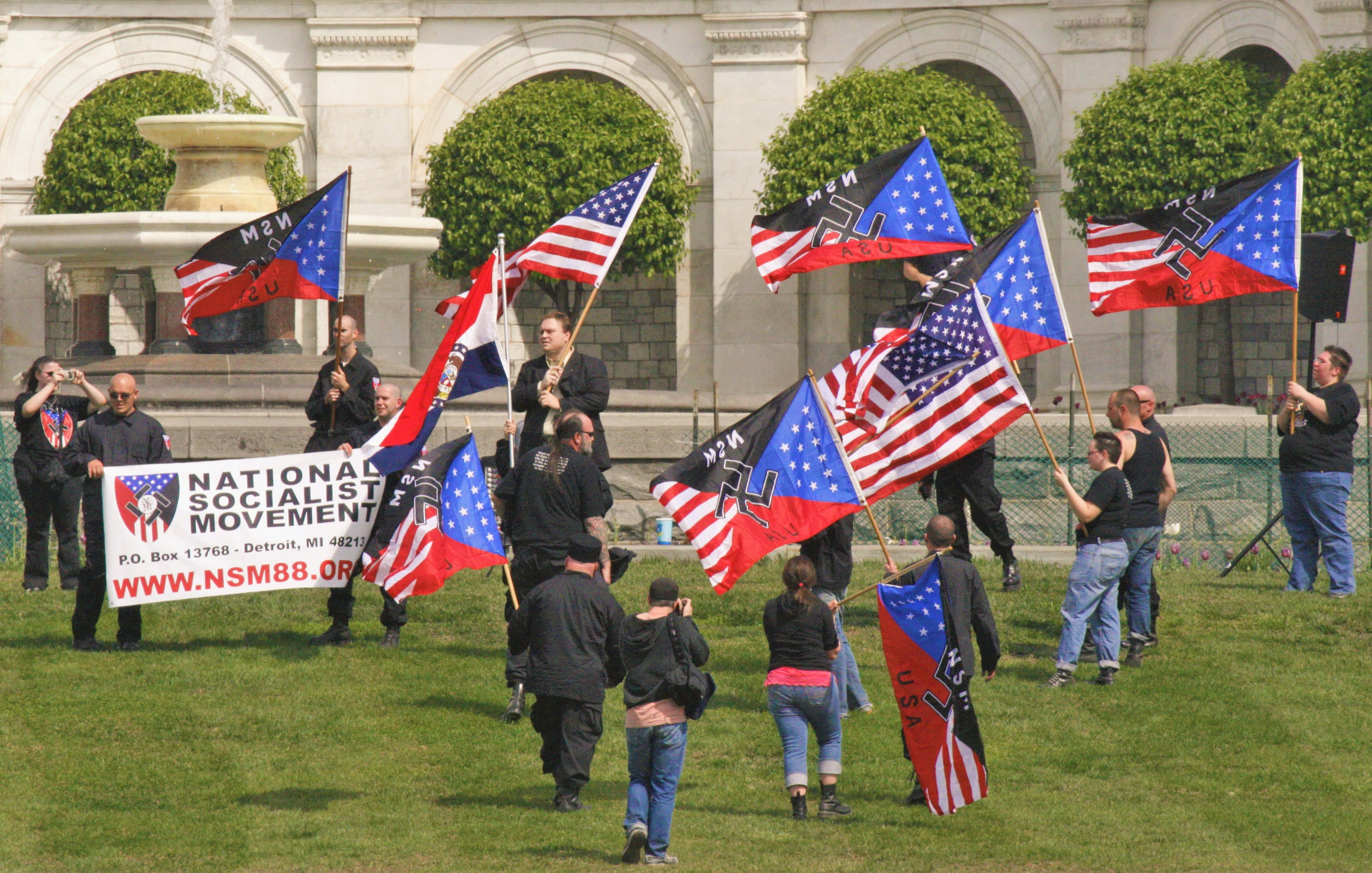
An NSM rally on the west lawn of the United States Capitol building, Washington, D.C., in 2008

The National Socialist Movement (NSM or NSM88) (Note: NSM88 is sometimes used to distinguish the group from other entities using the NSM abbreviation, and NSM88 is used in the URL of the group's website. It combines the group's initials and the number 88, which is an abbreviation for "Heil Hitler" used by neo-Nazis.) is a U.S.-based neo-Nazi organization that was founded in 1974. The Anti-Defamation League has described the NSM as "one of the more explicitly neo-Nazi groups in the United States." It seeks the transformation of the United States into a white ethnostate from which Jews, non-Whites, and members of the LGBTQ community would be expelled and barred from citizenship.

Once considered the largest and most prominent neo-Nazi organization in the United States, its membership has plummeted since the late 2010s. It is a part of the Nationalist Front and is classified as a hate group by the Southern Poverty Law Center.

=== Atomwaffen Division ===
The Atomwaffen Division was a neo-Nazi and revolutionary nationalist group which was founded in the United States in 2015, and it was responsible for at least 11 murders. Atomwaffen adhered to the ideology of accelerationism, waging a war against the government to overthrow it and install an all-white fascist state. The Atomwaffen Division was disbanded in July 2020.

=== 2017 Charlottesville rally ===
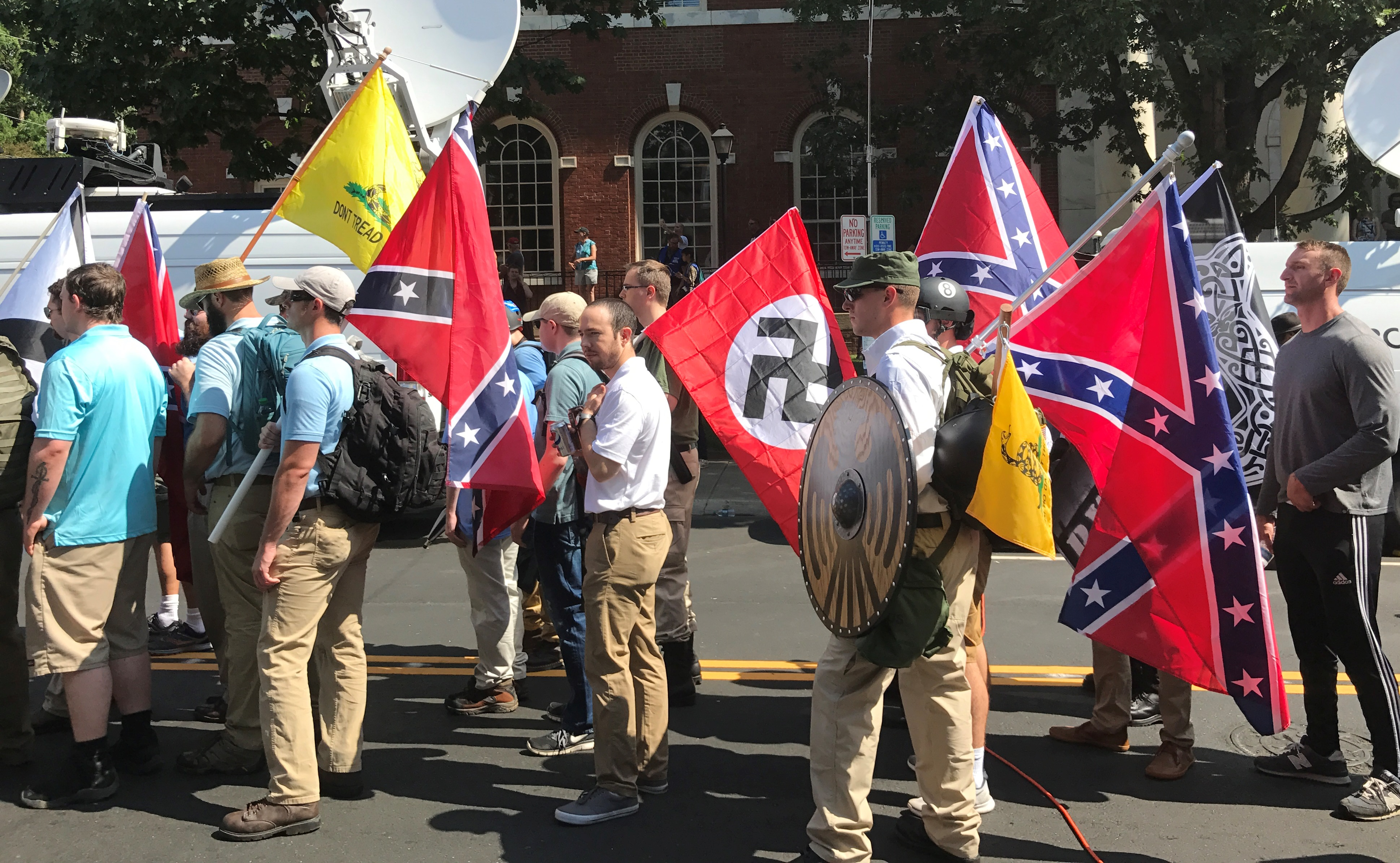
Rally participants preparing to enter Emancipation Park in Charlottesville, Virginia, on August 12, 2017, carrying Neo-Confederate flags, Confederate battle flags, Gadsden flags, a Nazi flag, and a flag depicting Mjölnir

From August 11 to 12, 2017, the Unite the Right rally, a white-nationalist event, took place in Charlottesville, Virginia. It was organized by Richard B. Spencer and Jason Kessler, both neo-Nazism adherents. Marchers included members of the alt-right, neo-Confederates, neo-fascists, white nationalists, neo-Nazis, Klansmen, and far-right militias.

Some groups chanted racist and antisemitic slogans and carried weapons, Nazi and neo-Nazi symbols, the valknut, Confederate battle flags, Deus vult crosses, flags, and other symbols of various past and present antisemitic and anti-Islamic groups. The organizers' stated goals included the unification of the American white nationalist movement and opposing the proposed removal of the statue of General Robert E. Lee from Charlottesville's former Lee Park. The rally sparked a national debate over Confederate iconography, racial violence, and white supremacy.

=== Patriot Front ===
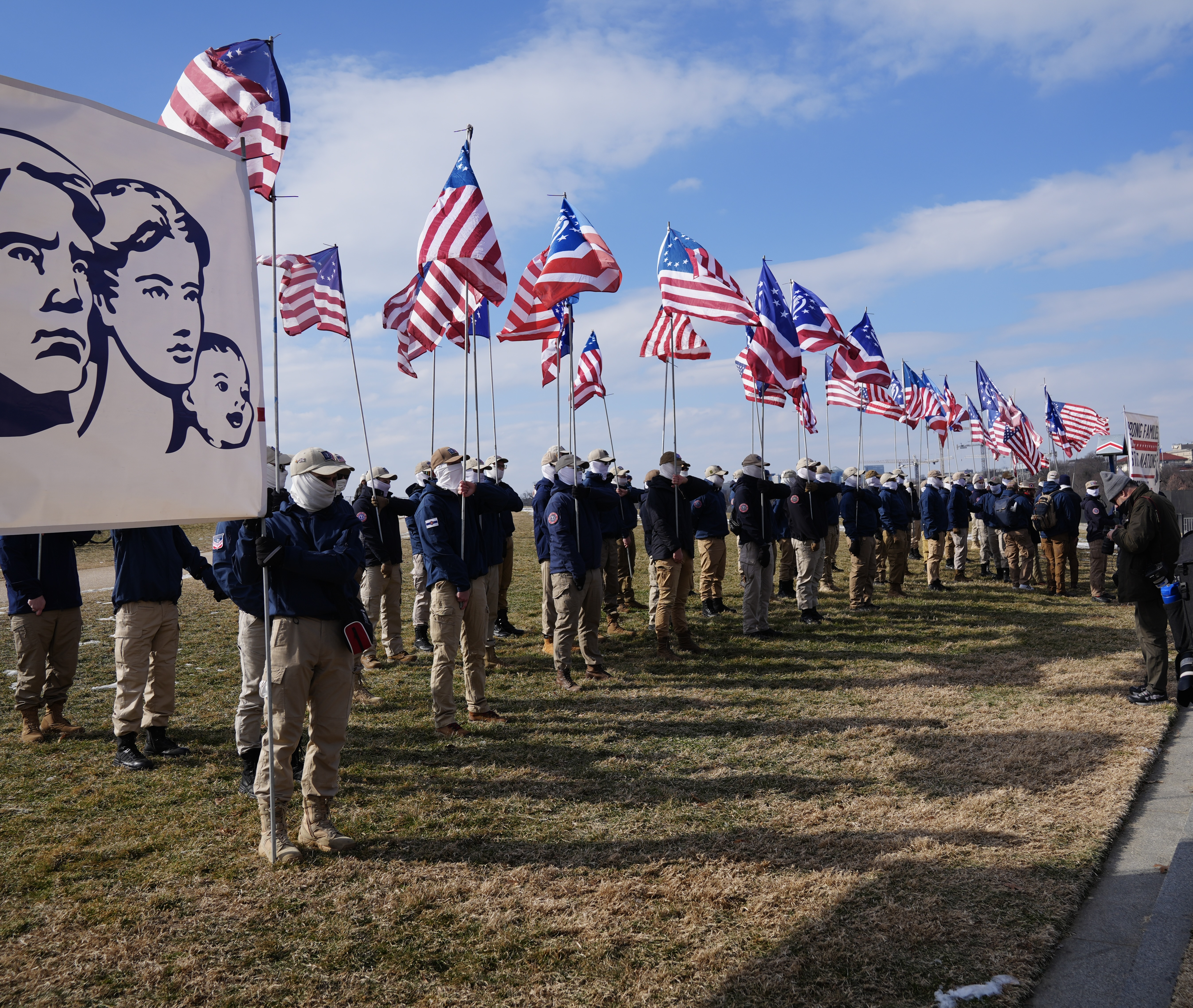
Patriot Front gathering in Washington DC in January 2025

Patriot Front is an American white supremacist and neo-fascist hate group. Part of the broader alt-right movement, the group split off from the neo-Nazi organization Vanguard America in the aftermath of the Unite the Right rally in 2017.

Patriot Front's aesthetic combines traditional Americana with fascist symbolism. Internal communications within the group indicated it had approximately 200 members as of late 2021. According to the Anti-Defamation League, the group generated 82% of reported incidents in 2021 involving the distribution of racist, antisemitic, and other hateful propaganda in the United States, comprising 3,992 incidents in every continental state.

=== Aryan Freedom Network ===
The Aryan Freedom Network is a Klan-affiliated Christian Identity neo-Nazi group founded in Texas in 2018. According to the Terrorism Research and Analysis Consortium, the Aryan Freedom Network has as many as 1,500 members as of late 2025, which would make it the biggest neo-Nazi group in the U.S., the rest of the neo-Nazi groups having only some hundreds of members.

== Donald Trump and fascism ==
Asked: Are there limits on your global power?

Yeah, there is one thing. My own morality. My own mind. It's the only thing that can stop me. I don't need international law. I'm not looking to hurt people.

— Donald Trump, January 7, 2026

New York Times White House correspondents wrote that "Mr. Trump's assessment... was the most blunt acknowledgment yet of his worldview. At its core is the concept that national strength, rather than laws, treaties and conventions, should be the deciding factor as powers collide."

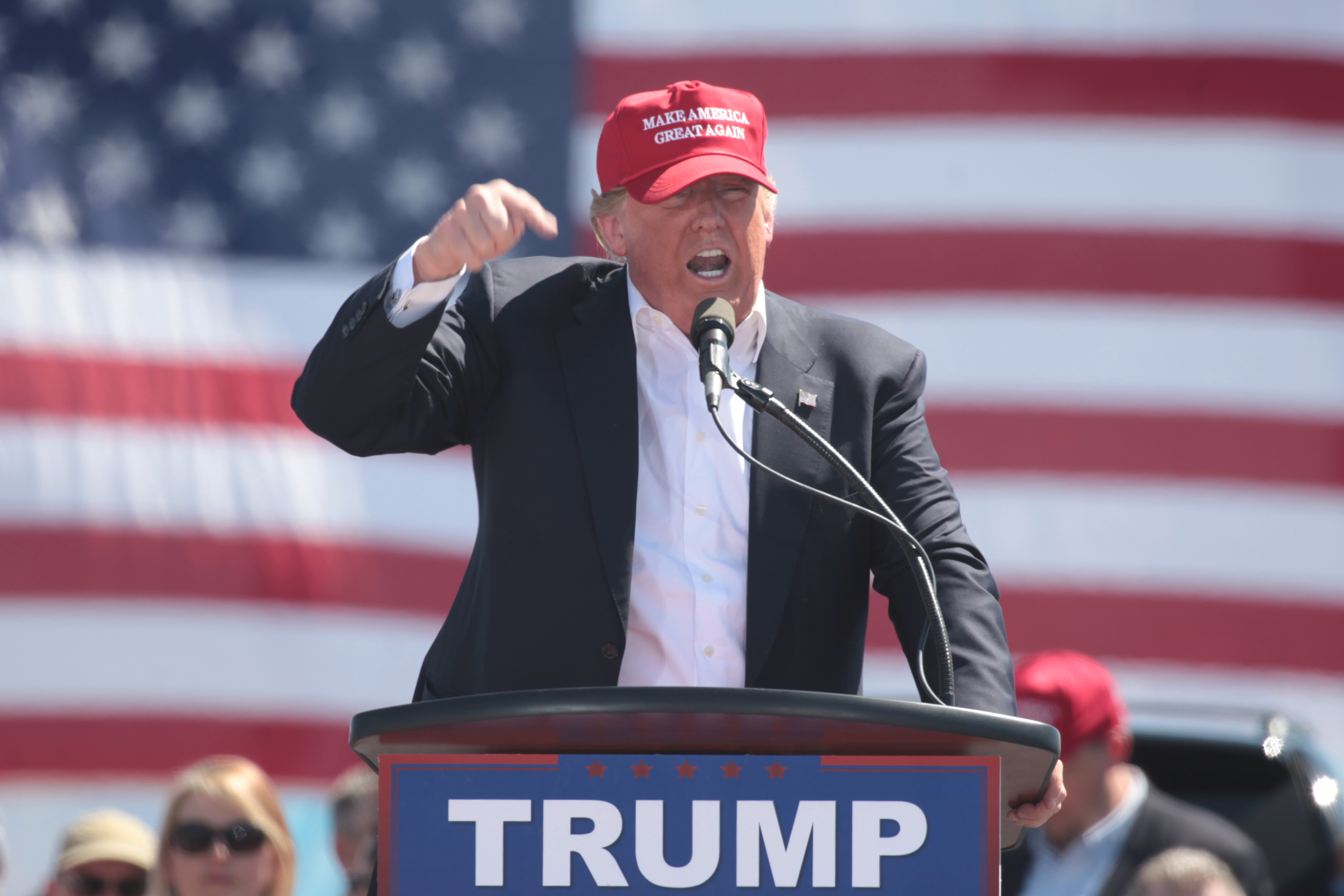
Donald Trump speaking with supporters at a campaign rally at Fountain Park in Fountain Hills, Arizona, 2016

Political scientists, historians, journalists, and former officials have increasingly characterized Donald Trump, the 45th and 47th president of the United States, as a fascist, especially during his 2024 presidential campaign and second term as president. Richard Lachmann, professor of historical sociology at State University of New York, perceived Trumpism as similar to Benito Mussolini's Italian fascism and academic research into the topic shows there exists a prevalence of fascism and neo-fascism within Trumpism. Brian Klaas—a political scientist at the University College London, Michael Beschloss—a historian of U.S. presidential history, and Ruth Ben-Ghiat—a historian specialized in the study of Mussolini, have further compared Trump's perceived anti-democratic tendencies and egotistical personality to the sentiments and rhetoric of Benito Mussolini and Italian fascism. Trump has also been characterized as authoritarian and populist by Daniel Steinmetz-Jenkins, a historian on fascism at Wesleyan University, General Mark Milley—former Chairman of the Joint Chiefs of Staff, Sidney Blumenthal—U.S. journalist and scholar, and Michael Tomasky—editor of The New Republic.

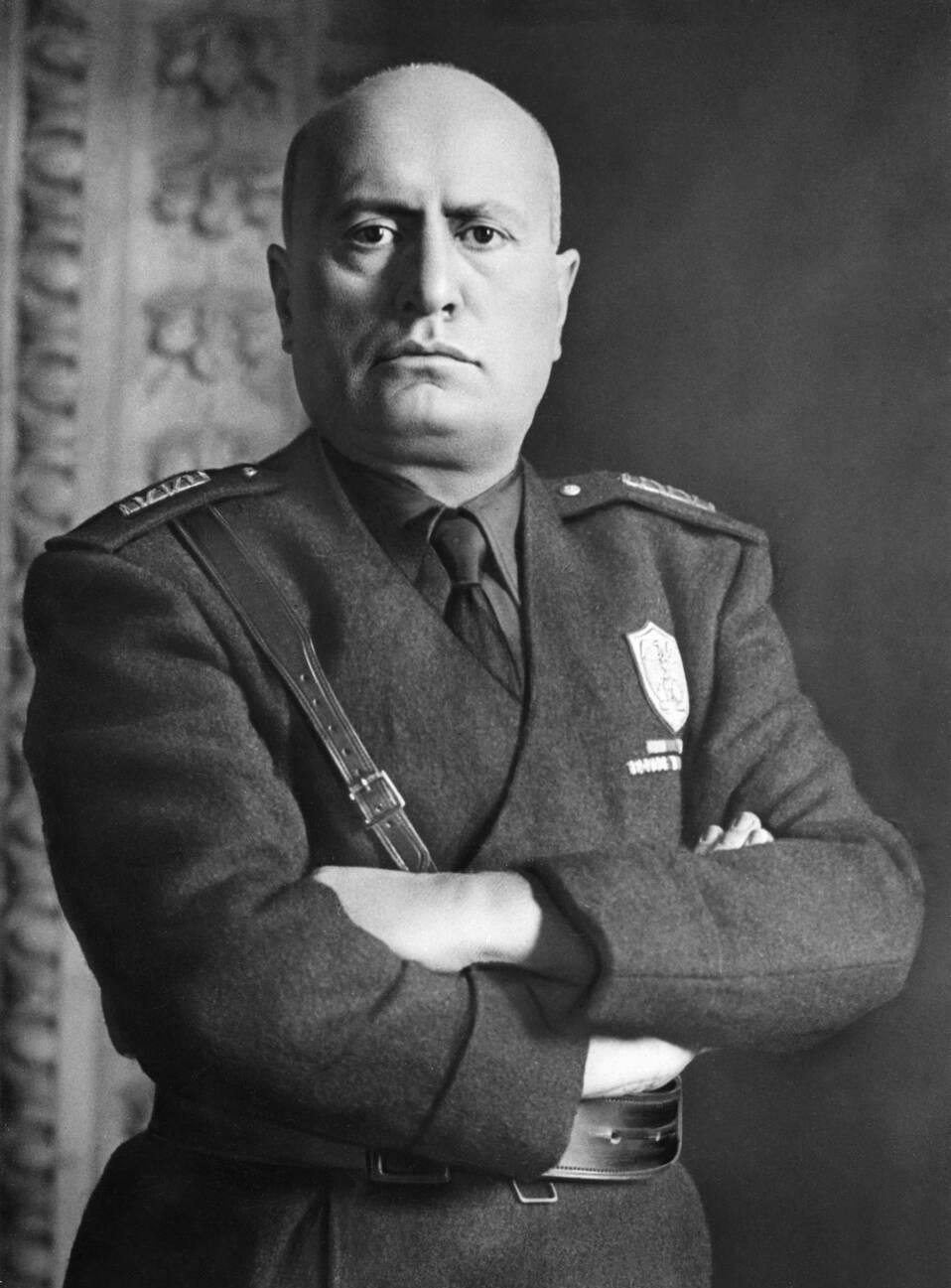
Historians and election experts have compared Trump's anti-democratic tendencies and egotistical personality to the sentiments and rhetoric of Benito Mussolini and Italian fascism.

Madeleine Albright, the former secretary of state, warned about what she believed were dangers of contemporary fascism in her 2018 book. Some scholars have drawn comparisons between the political stylings of Donald Trump and fascist leaders. Such assessments began during Trump's 2016 presidential campaign, continuing throughout the first Trump presidency as he appeared to court far-right extremists, including his attempts to overturn the 2020 United States presidential election after losing to Joe Biden, and culminating in the 2021 United States Capitol attack.

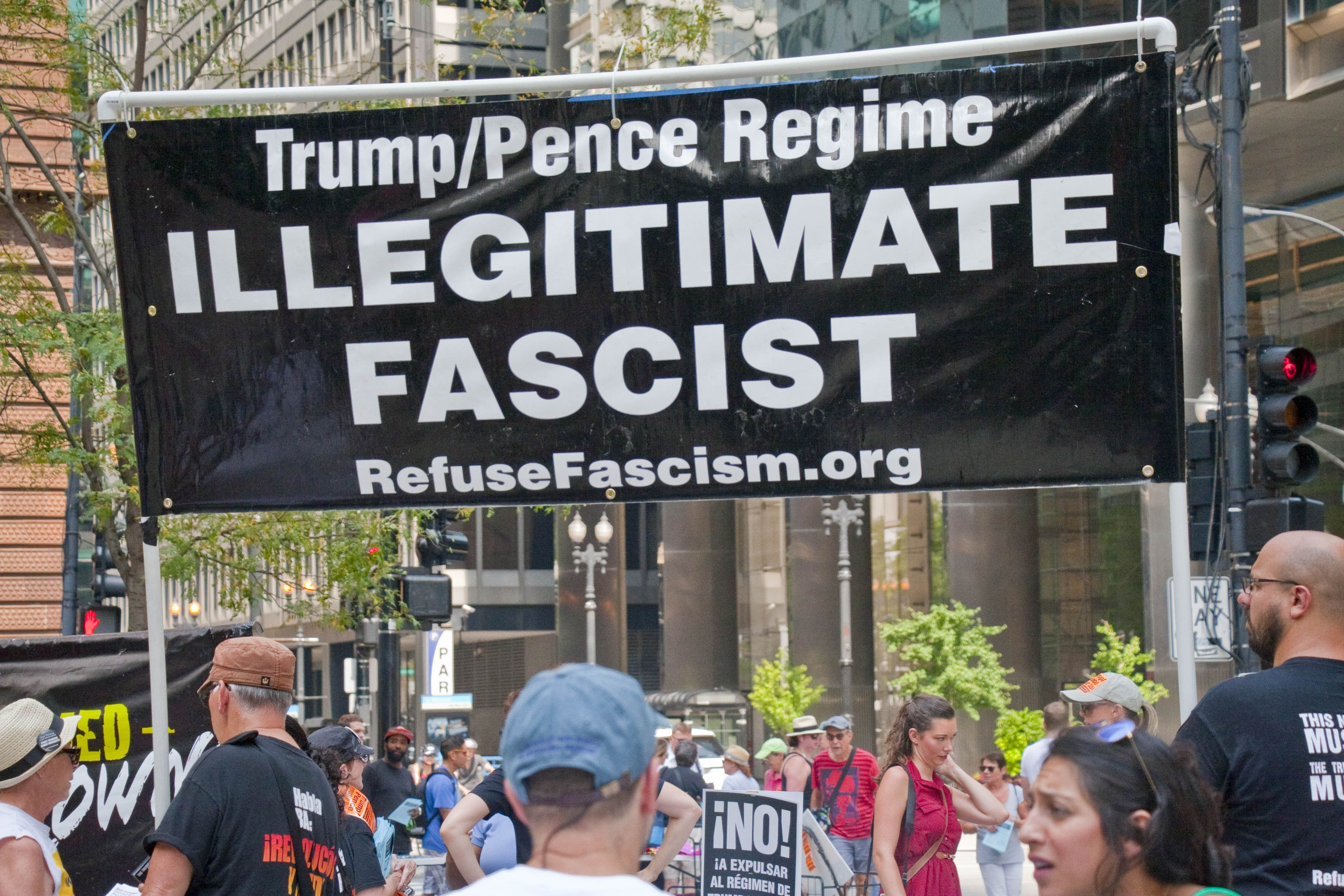
Protest sign at a rally in 2018 describing Donald Trump as a fascist

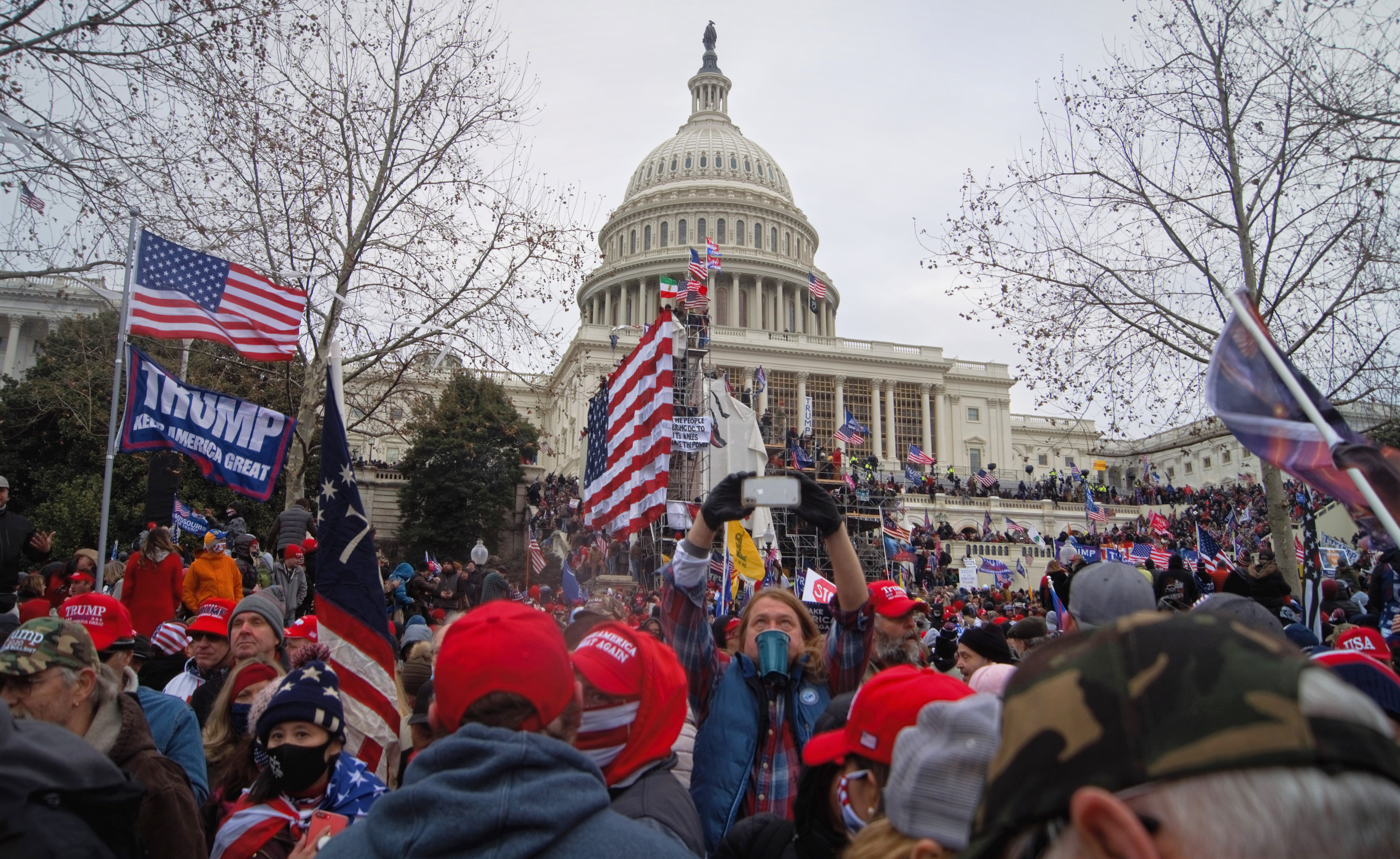
The January 6 United States Capitol attack

The attack on the United States Capitol by supporters of Donald Trump on January 6, 2021, has been compared by law historian Benjamin Carter Hett to the Beer Hall Putsch, a failed coup attempt in Germany by Nazi Party leader Adolf Hitler against the Weimar government in 1923.

In "Trump and the Legacy of a Menacing Past", Henry Giroux argued understanding the rise of "fascist politics" in the U.S. necessitates examining the power of language, social media, and public spectacle in fostering American-style fascism. Jason Stanley argued in 2018 that Trump employed "fascist techniques" to mobilize his base and weaken liberal democratic institutions. Trump has also been compared to Indian Prime Minister Narendra Modi, while former aide Anthony Scaramucci compared Trump to Benito Mussolini and Augusto Pinochet.

Since Trump was elected to office in 2016, academics have compared Trump's politics to fascism. Several, such as Benjamin R. Teitelbaum and Roger Griffin, have pointed out that contrasts exist between historical fascism and Trump's politics. Some scholars have also argued that "fascist elements" have operated within and around Trump's movement. Following the January 6 attack, some voices within the academic community including Robert Paxton felt that things had changed and that Trump's politics and connections with fascism deserved greater scrutiny. According to an October 2024 poll held by ABC News and Ipsos, 49% of American registered voters considered Trump to be a fascist, (Note: From a poll of 2,392 registered voters, including 44% that describe "only Trump" as fascist and 5% that describe both Trump and Harris as fascists.) defined in the poll as "a political extremist who seeks to act as a dictator, disregards individual rights and threatens or uses force against their opponents." Another YouGov survey from the same year reported that about 20% of Americans believed that Trump saw Hitler as completely bad; among Republican respondents, four in ten believed that Trump held such a position. The same poll reported that nearly half of Trump voters would continue to support a political candidate even if they said Hitler had done some good things, a position held by a quarter of all respondents.

During the second presidency of Trump, seven academics (Jason Stanley, Marci Shore, Timothy Snyder, Johann Chapoutot, Paul Lerner, Anne Berg, Diana Garvin, Tiffany Florvil, Claudia Koonz and Asma Mhalla) denounced what they saw as Trump's authoritarianism, which they explicitly argued could be linked to fascism. However, experts Christopher R. Browning and Roger Griffin contested this comparison, although Browning noted "uncanny resemblances" between Trump and Hitler.

== Anti-fascism ==
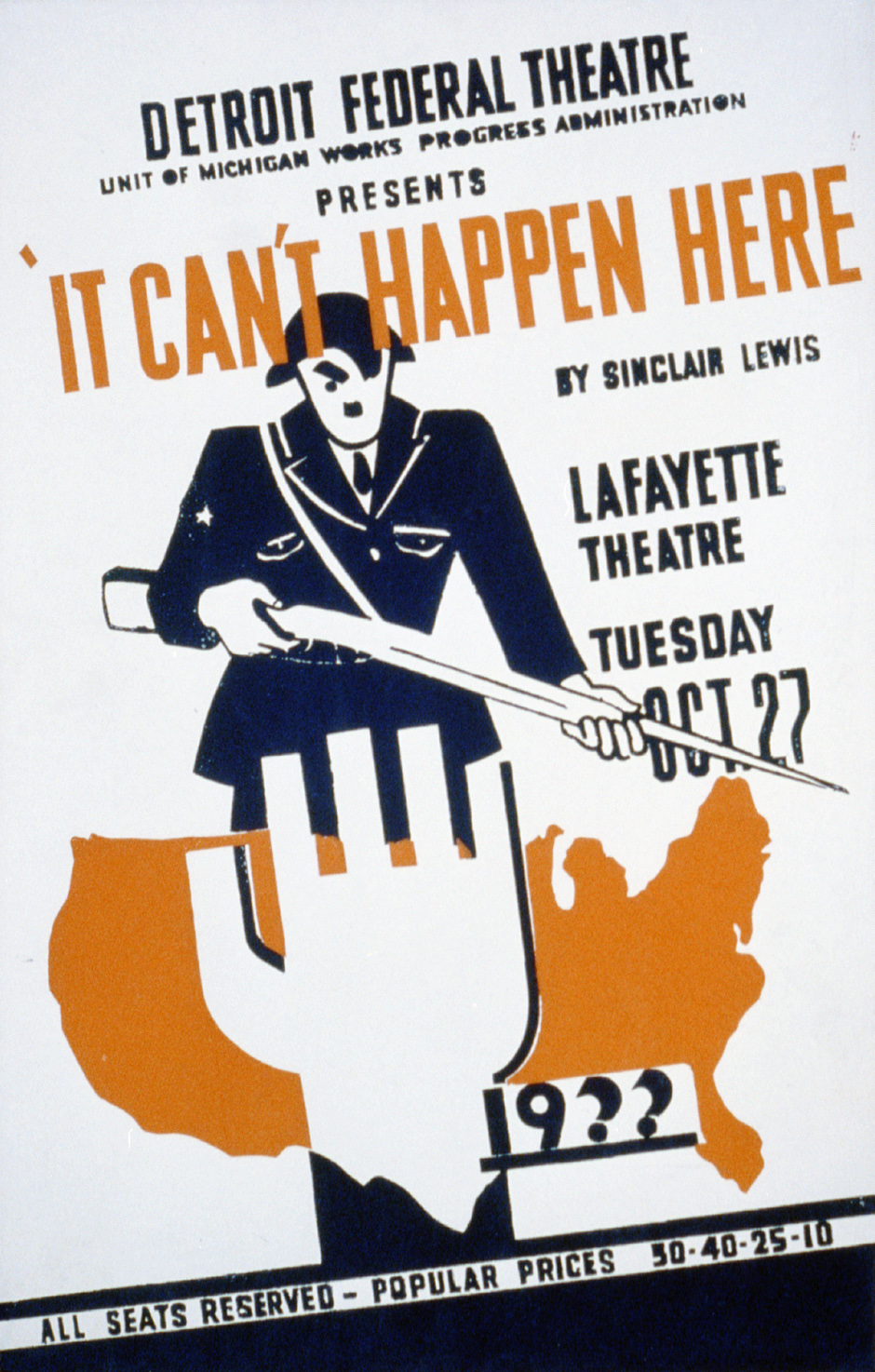
Poster for the stage adaptation of It Can't Happen Here, October 27, 1936, at the Lafayette Theater as part of the Detroit Federal Theatre

=== During World War II ===
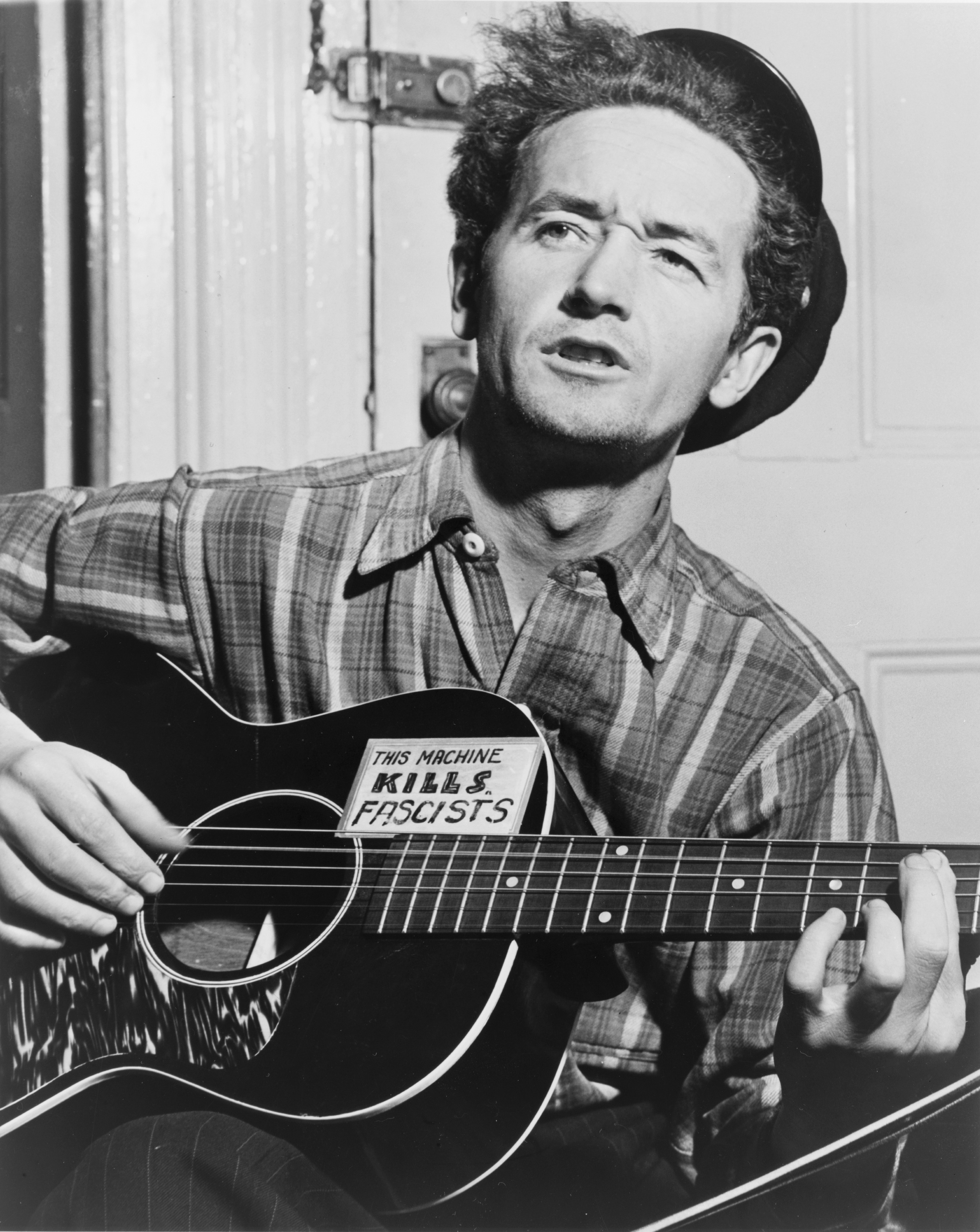
American singer-songwriter and anti-fascist Woody Guthrie and his guitar labeled "This machine kills fascists"

Anti-fascist Italian expatriates in the United States founded the Mazzini Society in Northampton, Massachusetts, in September 1939 to work toward ending Fascist rule in Italy. As political refugees from Mussolini's regime, they disagreed among themselves on whether to ally with communists and anarchists or to exclude them. In 1942, the Mazzini Society joined other anti-Fascist Italian expatriates in the Americas at a conference in Montevideo, Uruguay. They unsuccessfully promoted one of their members, Carlo Sforza, to become the post-Fascist leader of a republican Italy. The Mazzini Society dispersed after the overthrow of Mussolini as most of its members returned to Italy.

=== Post-World War II ===
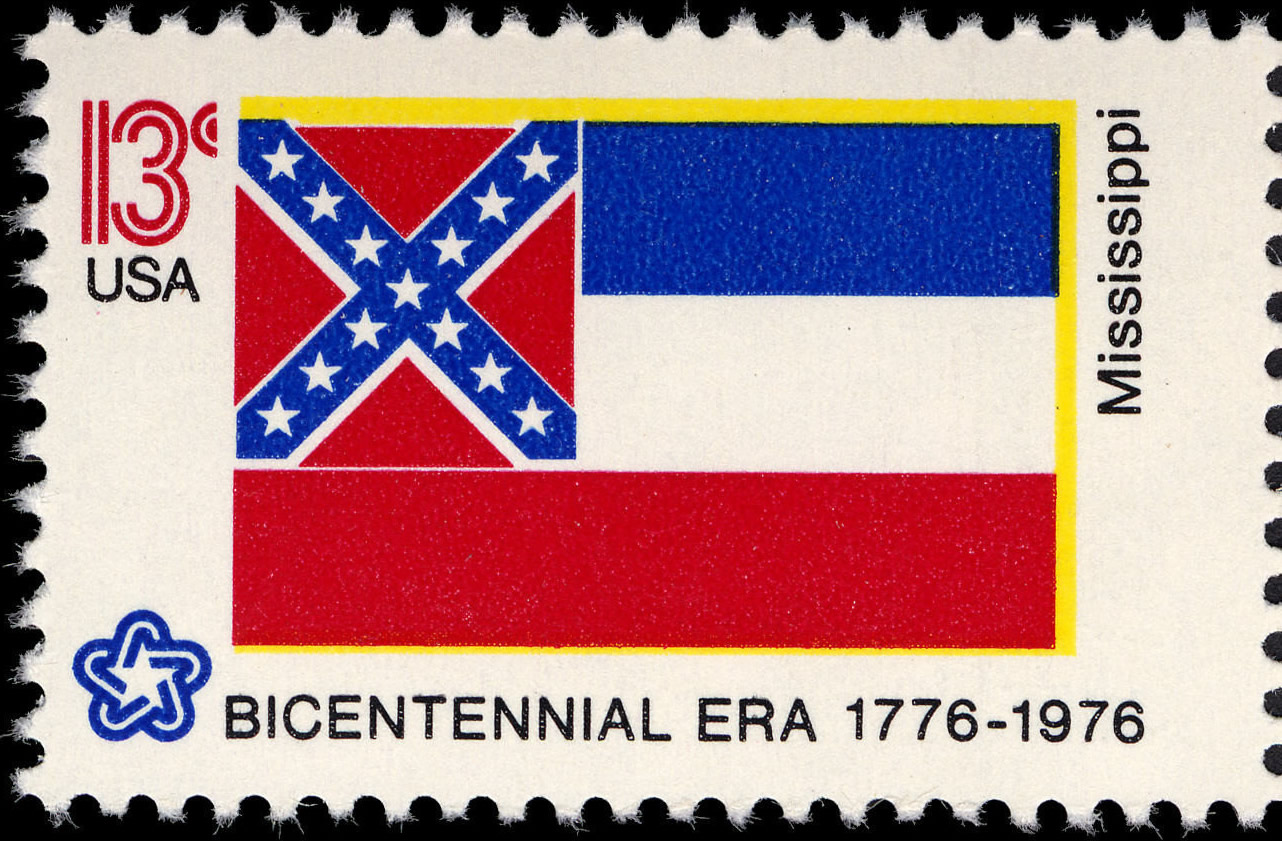
The Mississippi state flag as depicted in the 1976 bicentennial postage stamp series.

During the Second Red Scare, which occurred in the United States in the years that immediately followed the end of World War II, the term "premature anti-fascist" came into currency. It was used to describe Americans who had actively agitated or worked against fascism, such as Americans who had fought for the Republicans during the Spanish Civil War before fascism was seen as a proximate and an existential threat to the United States (which only occurred generally after the invasion of Poland by Nazi Germany and only occurred universally after the attack on Pearl Harbor). The implication was that such persons were either communists or communist sympathizers whose loyalty to the United States was suspect. However, the historians John Earl Haynes and Harvey Klehr have written that no documentary evidence of the U.S. government's references to American members of the International Brigades as "premature antifascists" has been found: instead, all of the records of the FBI, the OSS, and the United States Army contained terms such as Communist, Red, subversive, and radical. Indeed, Haynes and Klehr indicate that they have found many examples of members of the XV International Brigade and their supporters sardonically referring to themselves as "premature antifascists."

=== Since the 1980s ===
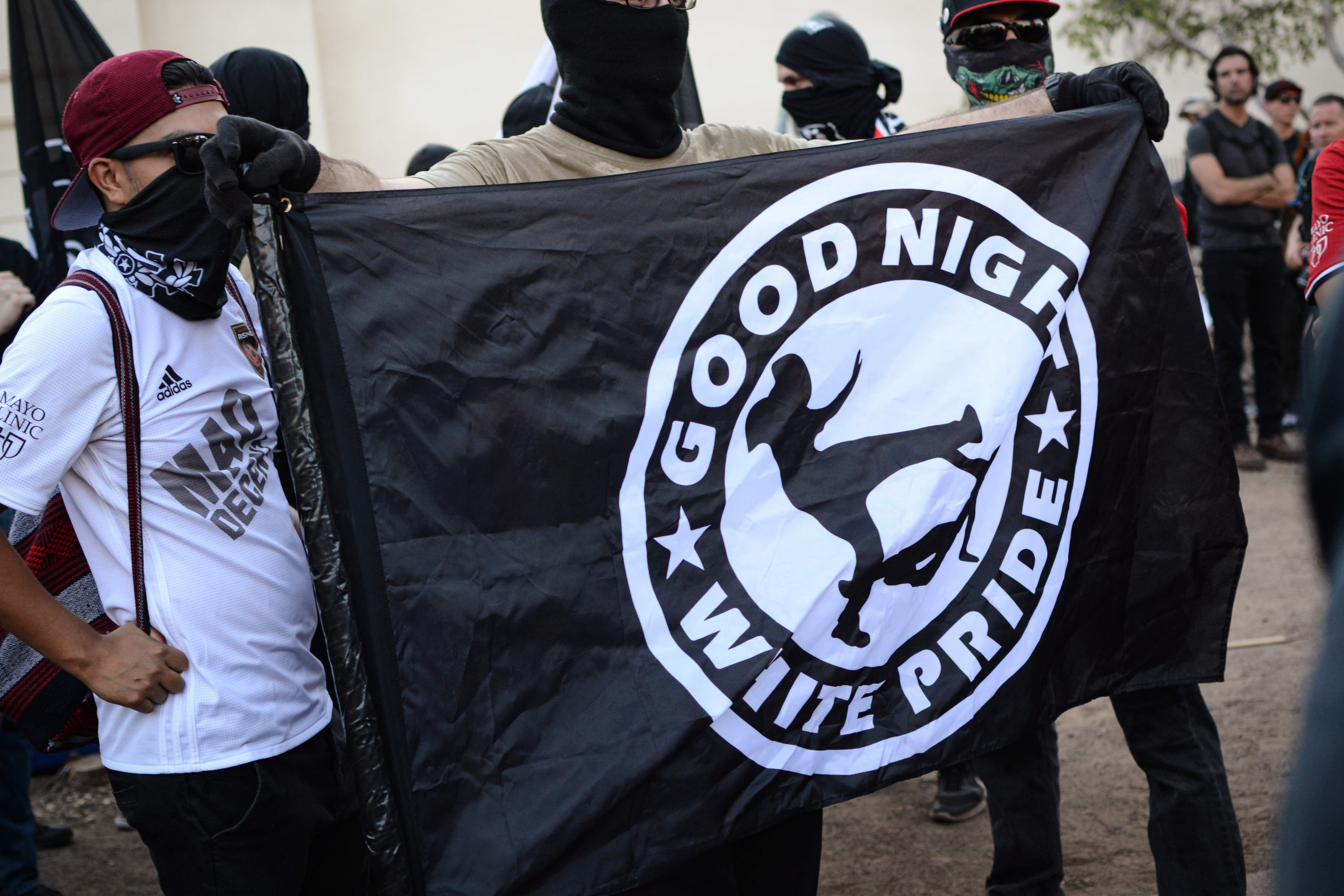
Anti-fascists with a banner which reads "good night white pride"

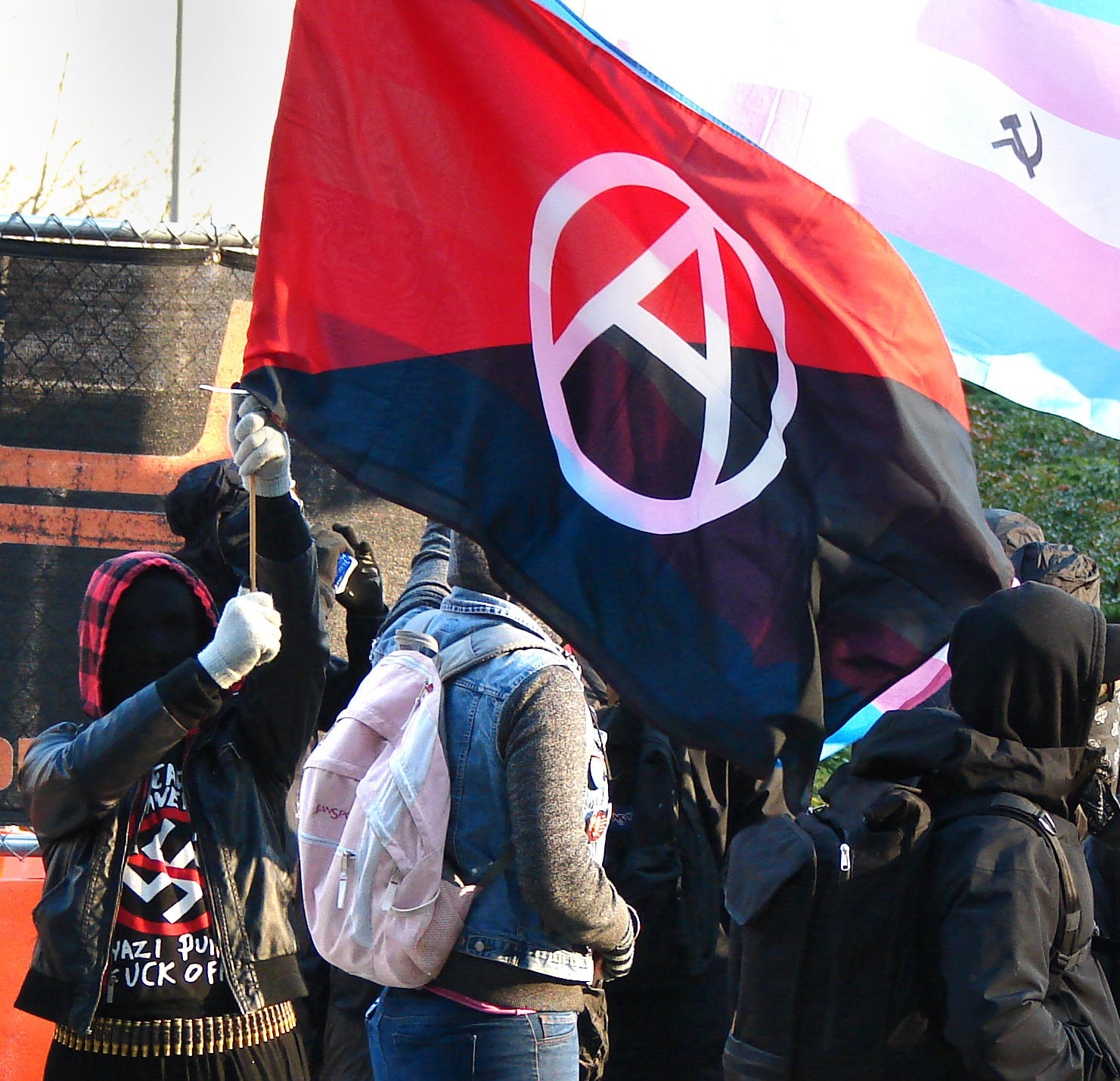
Antifascist activists with a modified anarchist red and black flag and a transgender pride flag containing the hammer and sickle in a 2017 protest

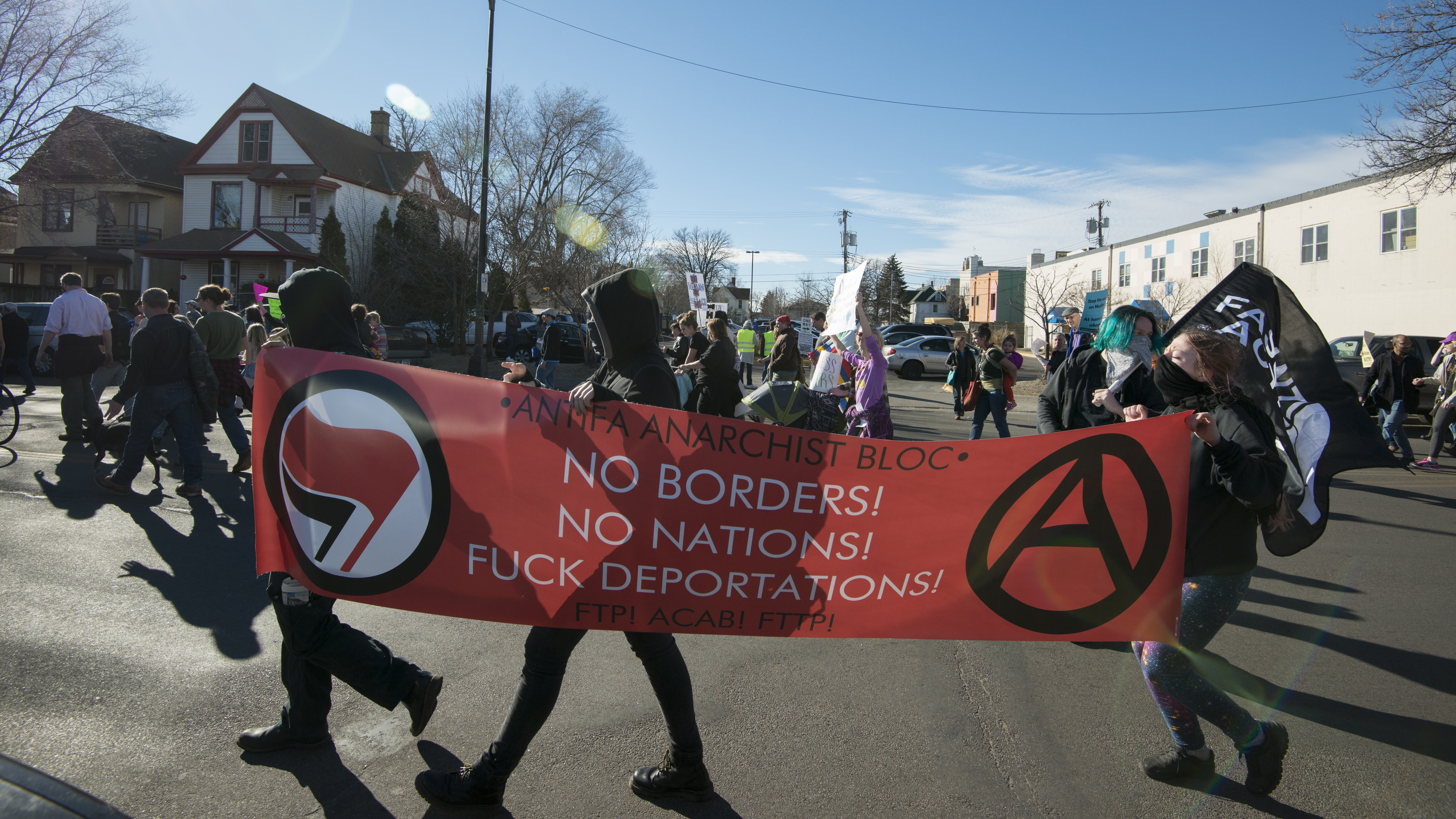
Protesters hold an anti-deportation banner in Minneapolis on February 18, 2017.

Modern antifa politics can be traced back to opposition to the infiltration of Britain's punk scene by white power skinheads in the 1970s and 1980s and the emergence of neo-Nazism in Germany following the fall of the Berlin Wall. In Germany, young leftists, including anarchists and punk fans, renewed the practice of street-level anti-fascism. Columnist Peter Beinart writes that "in the late '80s, left-wing punk fans in the United States began following suit, though they initially called their groups Anti-Racist Action (ARA) on the theory that Americans would be more familiar with fighting against racism than they would be with fighting against fascism".

Dartmouth College historian Mark Bray, author of Antifa: The Anti-Fascist Handbook, credits the ARA as being the precursor to modern antifa groups in the United States. In the late 1980s and 1990s, ARA activists toured with popular punk rock and skinhead bands to prevent Klansmen, neo-Nazis, and other assorted white supremacists from recruiting. Their motto was "We go where they go," meaning that they would confront far-right activists in concerts and they would actively remove their materials from public places. In Pennsylvania in 2002, the ARA disrupted a speech by Matthew F. Hale, the head of the white supremacist group World Church of the Creator, resulting in a fight and twenty-five arrests. In 2007, Rose City Antifa, likely the first group to utilize the name "Antifa", was formed in Portland, Oregon. Other antifa groups in the United States have other genealogies. In 1987, in Boise, Idaho, the Northwest Coalition Against Malicious Harassment (NWCAMH) was created in response to the annual Aryan Nations meeting near Hayden Lake, Idaho. The NWCAMH brought together over 200 affiliated public and private organizations and it also helped people across six states—Colorado, Idaho, Montana, Oregon, Washington, and Wyoming. In Minneapolis, Minnesota, a group which called itself the Baldies was formed in 1987 for the purpose of directly fighting against neo-Nazi groups. In 2013, the "most radical" chapters of the ARA formed the Torch Antifa Network, which has chapters throughout the United States. Other antifa groups are parts of different associations, such as NYC Antifa, or they operate independently.

Modern anti-fascism in the United States is a highly decentralized leaderless resistance movement. Antifa political activists are anti-racists who engage in protest tactics, seeking to combat fascists and racists such as neo-Nazis, white supremacists, and other far-right extremists. This may involve digital activism, harassment, physical violence, and property damage against those whom they identify as belonging to the far-right. According to antifa historian Mark Bray, most antifa activity is nonviolent, involving poster and flyer campaigns, delivering speeches, marching in protest, and community organizing on behalf of anti-racist and anti-white nationalist causes.

A June 2020 study by the Center for Strategic and International Studies of 893 terrorism incidents in the United States since 1994 found one attack staged by an anti-fascist that led to a fatality (the 2019 Tacoma attack, in which the attacker, who self-identified as an anti-fascist, was killed by police), while attacks by white supremacists or other right-wing extremists resulted in 329 deaths. Since the study was published, one homicide has been connected to anti-fascism. A DHS draft report from August 2020 similarly did not include "Antifa" as a considerable threat while noting white supremacists as the top domestic terror threat.

There have been multiple efforts to discredit antifa groups via hoaxes on social media, many of them false flag attacks originating from alt-right and 4chan users posing as antifa backers on Twitter. Some hoaxes have been picked up and reported as fact by right-leaning media.

During the George Floyd protests in May and June 2020, the Trump administration blamed antifa for orchestrating the mass demonstrations. Analysis of federal arrests did not find links to antifa. There had been repeated calls by the Trump administration to designate antifa as a terrorist organization, a move that academics, legal experts, and others argued would both exceed the authority of the presidency and violate the First Amendment.

On September 22, 2025, Trump signed an executive order intended to designate antifa as a domestic terrorist organization. Academics, legal experts, and others have argued such an action exceeds the authority of the presidency and violates the First Amendment. Several analyses, reports, and studies have concluded that antifa is not a major domestic terrorism risk.

== See also ==
- Antisemitism by country#United States
  - Antisemitism in the United States
    - History of antisemitism in the United States
- Democratic backsliding in the United States
- Discrimination in the United States
- Far-right politics#United States
- Far-right subcultures#United States
- Fascism in North America#United States
- Nativism (politics)#United States
  - Nativism in United States politics
- Nazism in the Americas
- Neo-Confederates, believers in the Lost Cause of the Confederacy
- Political violence in the United States
- Racism by country#United States
  - Racism in the United States
    - Racism against African Americans
    - Racism against Native Americans in the United States
- Radicalism in the United States
  - Radical right (United States)
- Right-wing terrorism#United States
- Secession in the United States
- Slavery in the United States
- Terrorism in the United States
  - Domestic terrorism in the United States
    - Timeline of terrorist attacks in the United States
- White backlash#United States
- White flight#United States
- White nationalism#United States
  - White nationalism in the United States
- White supremacy#United States
  - White supremacy in the United States
- Xenophobia#United States
  - Xenophobia in the United States
- Business Plot
- Operation Red Dog
- Leith, North Dakota, a tiny American town which thwarted an attempted takeover by neo-Nazis in 2013
- Springfield, Maine, a tiny American town which thwarted an attempted takeover by neo-Nazis in 2022
- Northwest Territorial Imperative
- List of fascist movements
  - List of fascist movements by country
- List of Ku Klux Klan organizations
- List of neo-Nazi organizations
- List of organizations designated by the Southern Poverty Law Center as hate groups
  - List of organizations designated by the Southern Poverty Law Center as anti-LGBTQ hate groups
- List of white nationalist organizations

== Sources ==
- Bump, Philip (November 2024b). "For nearly half of Trump voters, overt appreciation of Hitler is acceptable". The Washington Post. Archived from the original on November 5, 2024.
- Chalmers, David M. (1987). Hooded Americanism: The History of the Ku Klux Klan. Durham, NC: Duke University Press. p. 512. ISBN 978-0822307303.
- Chomsky, Noam (2003). Hegemony or survival : America's quest for global dominance. Henry Holt and Company, LLC. ISBN 0-8050-7400-7.
- Green, Michael S.; Stabler, Scott L. (2015). Ideas and Movements that Shaped America: From the Bill of Rights to "Occupy Wall Street" (3 vols.). Santa Barbara, California: ABC-CLIO. p. 390. ISBN 978-1610692519.
- Jackson, Paul Nicholas (2021). "Debate: Donald Trump and Fascism Studies". Fascism. 10 (1): 1–15. doi:10.1163/22116257-10010009. ISSN 2211-6257.
- Langer, Gary; Sparks, Steven (October 25, 2024). "Half of Americans see Donald Trump as a fascist: POLL". ABC News. Archived from the original on November 5, 2024.
- Maher, Henry (2023). "Neoliberal fascism? Fascist trends in early neoliberal thought and echoes in the present". Contemporary Political Theory. 23 (3): 392–410. doi:10.1057/s41296-023-00657-x. ISSN 1470-8914.
- Wolter, Erik V.; Masters, Robert J. (2004). Loyalty On Trial: One American's Battle With The FBI. New York: iUniverse. p. 65. ISBN 978-0595327034.
