= Camp Wille und Macht =

American Nazi camp for boys, 1934 New Jersey

- Formation: August 6, 1934
- Dissolved: 1934
- Location: Griggstown, New Jersey
- Members: c. 200
- Leader: Hugo Haas
- Parent organization: Friends of New Germany

Camp Wille und Macht ("Camp Will and Might") was an American Nazi summer camp for approximately 200 German-American boys that was operated by the Friends of New Germany along the Delaware and Raritan Canal in the Griggstown section of Franklin Township, Somerset County, New Jersey, in 1934.

== History ==
=== Background ===
Upon seizing power in Germany in 1933, the Nazi Party wished to dispel any accusation of interfering in American politics and thereby disbanded its American wing, reorganizing it first as the Friends of the Hitler Movement in America and then as the League of Friends of the New Germany, which would later become the German American Bund. Several Friends chapters existed in New Jersey, and Nazi activity frequently led to tension in the state throughout 1934, particularly in northern cities with large German-American populations, including Union City, Jersey City, and Hoboken.

The Friends established a youth movement within the organization, modeling it on the Hitler Youth and adopting the same uniforms and marches as their German counterparts. As part of the youth movement's program, the Friends established several outdoor camps near local urban chapters of the organization. Because of their relative isolation, these camps became centers of Friends and Bund activity beyond only the youth movement. In 1935, for instance, the Bund used a Pennsylvania camp near Croydon to write the organization's constitution. The camps were highly controversial among local communities, and their conditions were frequently the target of accusations against the Bund. The Bund eventually operated 24 camps at its height, with plans to expand, including into Canada.

=== Opening and operation ===
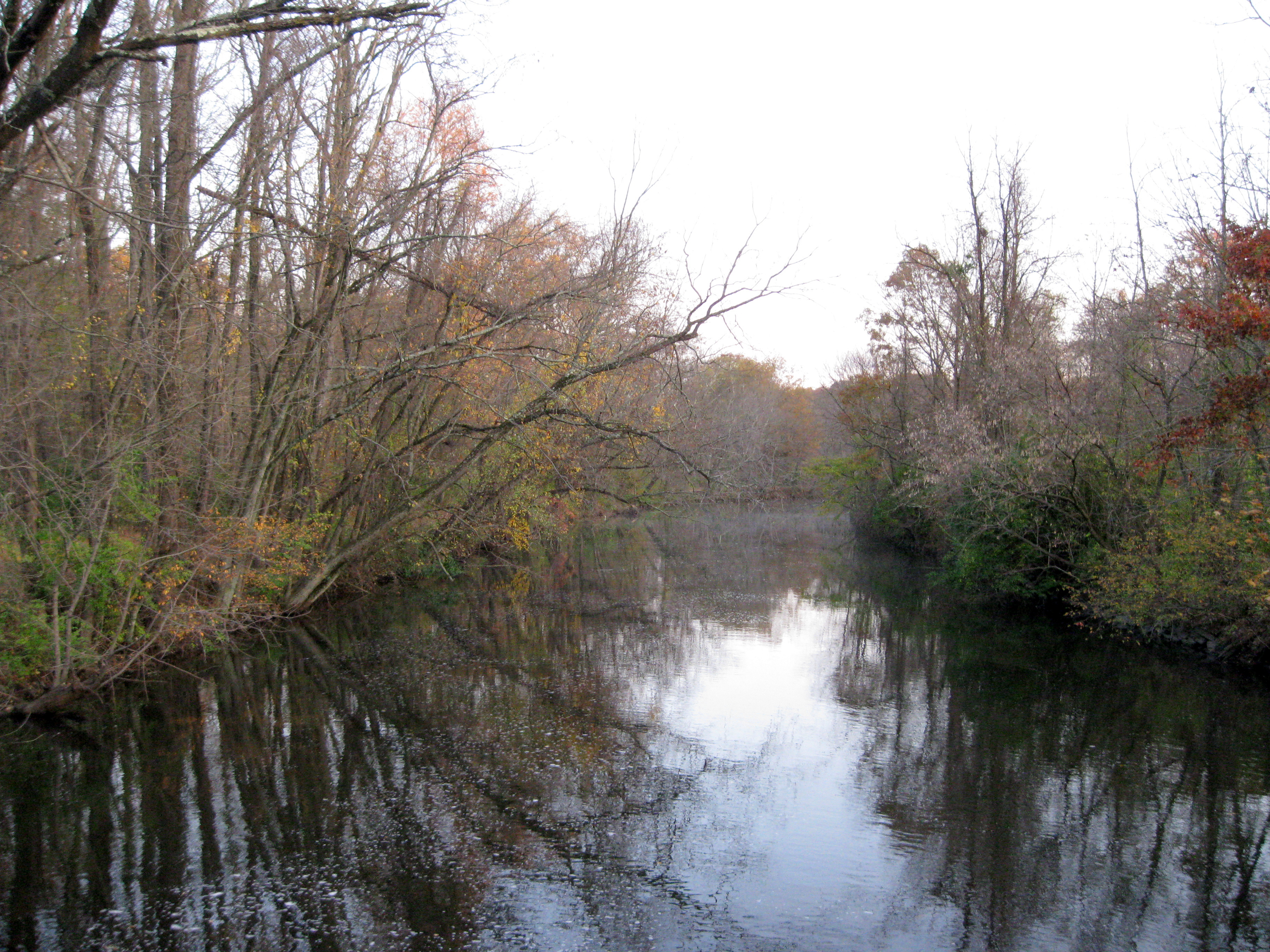
Camp Wille und Macht was located on a plot along the Delaware and Raritan Canal in Griggstown, New Jersey.

Dr. John Acken was the owner of the land in Griggstown where the camp operated, and likely was a member who donated it for the organization's use. The camp opened on August 6, 1934, and was the second Friends camp in the state, opening about six weeks after the opening of Camp Nordland in Mountain Lakes. A later report claimed that the camp's opening was initially met with "general indifference" among locals. That day, around 200 German-American children between the ages of eight and sixteen arrived on chartered train cars from New York City, Buffalo, and Philadelphia. The camp's name was shared with that of a German youth magazine. Soon after the camp opened, it held a memorial service for German president Paul von Hindenburg in conjunction with other Friends activities across the country, including a ceremony at Madison Square Garden.

A summer camp from the Princeton YMCA was located further up the road along the Millstone River, and its campers frequently encountered those at Wille und Macht while hiking north along the canal. One YMCA camper later remembered teasing and insulting the Wille und Macht campers as they walked by and at one point being hissed at as communists for wearing red pajamas. Hugo Haas, the leader of the camp and of the national youth organization, frequently spoke to press, inviting them to the camp on August 17 and holding a public gala on August 19 for four hundred viewers that was to climax with war games between the children. These war games, which would have included mock machine gun fire, were cancelled at the last moment, likely due to local pushback. Over the camp's four weeks of operation, eighty boys were withdrawn from the camp, mostly by parents who were not aware of the camp's overt Nazi associations. A local paper, the Princeton Herald, criticized the camp's proximity to Princeton University and the site of the Battle of Princeton, calling it "inappropriate" to house a Nazi camp near places that embodied American values.

=== Controversy and closure ===
New York Congressman Rep. Samuel Dickstein received what he estimated to be about two thousand letters of complaint about the indoctrination of American youth in Friends of the New Germany camps. Many Griggstown residents had written letters opposing the camp, whose nighttime marches and singing had become nuisance and whose planned war games worried locals. The Somerset County Legionnaires also announced that they would investigate into the activities of the Friends in the region. Dickstein visited the camp during its August 17 press day and again on his own on August 20. He described what he saw "an out-and-out Hitler camp" and was appalled at the unsanitary conditions, including a large amount of poison ivy. Dickstein summoned leader Hugo Haas to appear before the House Un-American Activities Committee, of which he was a member, on August 23 and 24 at the Bar Association building in New York. The hearings lasted until October and were frequently interrupted by Friends members shouting "Heil Hitler!" The investigation concluded that the Friends camps constituted attempts by "the American section of" Nazi Germany to influence American government policy.

By the last week of camp, fewer than one hundred campers remained. Because of the pressure from the investigation, Haas chose to privately send back the campers from Buffalo and Philadelphia three days early. The camp closed at the end of its planned four-week period on August 27, with Haas, despite the ongoing investigation, present at the site to order the remaining boys to "break camp." The camp was cleared and its equipment loaded into trucks within two hours. Haas expressed pleasure at what the children had learned and denied Dickstein's accusation that the camp had been covered in poison ivy. Haas told a reporter soon after that he looked forward to establishing another camp in New York the following year.

The Associated Press distributed several photos of the camp in 1934 with the caption: "As much conversation as possible is carried on in German, the 200 students wear brown shirts and drill in 'goose-step', and fly the Nazi flag alongside the Stars and Stripes. The leader, H. Haas, is shown drilling the boys." Haas denied that the brown color of the camp uniform had anything to do with the Brown Shirts. Haas also stated, "We are not Nazis in the accepted sense of the word. We are exactly what our name implies, friends of a new-found order in the Fatherland. Nazism is only part of that new order. We teach these boys the spirit and principles of true citizenship, self-reliance, and obedience. We teach them to speak the language of their mother country and to sing the songs their fathers loved to sing in their youth."

== Operation ==
Introducing Nazi iconography to American children was central to the mission of the camp (Associated Press photos, August 1934)

The camp was located on an approximately 230 square-foot plot along the south side of the Delaware and Raritan Canal and the adjacent Canal Road. Most campers were aged between six and twelve and most counselors were foreign nationals. The camp was led by Hugo Haas, a 23 year-old German immigrant from Brooklyn who also led the Friends' national youth movement. In camp, Haas was titled "the Leader."

== See also ==
- Camp Nordland – Resort in Andover, New Jersey
- Camp Siegfried – Nazi summer camp in New York
- Ku Klux Klan in New Jersey
- New Jersey Minutemen – Mob-organized pre-WWII anti-fascist and anti-Nazi supporter group

== Works cited ==
- Kelly, Thomas Lauren (1972). Amerika-Deutscher Vilksbund: 1924–1941 (MA thesis). University of Alabama at Birmingham. ISBN 9798342723589. ProQuest 31751824.
- Smolko, Ryan Patrick (2020). Pens and Tongues: Community Resistance to the German-American Bund, 1936–1939 (PhD thesis). Texas A&M University. hdl:1969.1/191874.
- Sokoll, Carl Anton (1974). The German-American Bund as a Model for American Fascism: 1924–1946 (Ed.D. thesis). Teachers College, Columbia University.
