= Amerika Deutsche Post =

Amerika Deutsche Post was an American Nazi propaganda newspaper published in New York prior to US entry into World War II. In September 1933 the paper was replaced by Das Neue Deutschland, the organ of the Friends of New Germany.
