= Tiffany Florvil =

American historian

Tiffany Nicole Florvil (born 1980) is an American historian. She teaches women's and gender history of 20th-century Europe at the University of New Mexico. Research focuses on modern European History after 1945, the African Diaspora, Black Germans and Black Internationalism.

== Life and research ==
Tiffany Florvil studied history and German literature at Florida State University until 2003 and received a master's degree in modern European gender and women's history from the University of Wisconsin-Madison in 2007. Florvil received her doctorate in modern European history from the University of South Carolina in 2013.

Florvil is the founder and co-editor of the book series Imagining Black Europe published by Peter-Lang-Verlag, which deals with the diverse development and historical research, as well as intersectional and interdisciplinary perspectives on Black Europe.

== Mobilizing Black Germany (2020) ==
Published in 2020, her book Mobilizing Black Germany. Afro-German Women and the Making of a Transnational Movement deals with the history of the Black German movement from the 1980s to the 2000s. The focus is on the activism of Afro-German women, whose voices have decisively shaped the ideas of black politics and solidarity in Germany. Florvil describes Audre Lorde's influence on the emergence of an Afro-German community and shows that the German protagonists of Black Feminism in contrast to the American ones - Audre Lorde, Toni Morrison or Angela Davis – are hardly known. The book received numerous prizes and awards.

The study shows the significance of the history of Black Germans, which has hardly been researched and has received little social attention to date, and is closely linked to racism and nationalism, especially with regard to the role of Black women in the emergence of a transnational Movement. Florvil's work particularly focuses on common ideas about German identity and history. The work was translated into German by Stephan Pauli under the title “Black Germany: Black, German, Feminist – the History of a Movement” and published in 2023.

The work received wide recognition in various scientific fields and was highly praised by many critics. Numerous reviews particularly highlighted Florvil's innovative approach, which contributes to a deeper understanding of the history of Black Germans and focuses on the role of Black women.
