= Friends of New Germany =

American pro-Nazi organization (1933–1935)

- Predecessor: Free Society of Teutonia
- Successor: German American Bund
- Formation: July 1933
- Founder: Heinz Spanknöbel
- Dissolved: December 1935
- Headquarters: New York City, United States
- Members: 5,000–10,000

Friends of New Germany (FONG; German: Die Freunde des Neuen Deutschland, FDND), sometimes called Friends of the New Germany, was a Nazi organization founded in the United States by German immigrants to support Nazism and Nazi Germany. It was succeeded by the German American Bund in 1936.

== History ==
Nazis outside of Germany made considerable efforts to establish an American counterpart organization. Recruiting commenced as early as 1924 with the formation of the Free Society of Teutonia.

In May 1933, the Deputy Führer, Rudolf Hess, gave German immigrant and German National Socialist German Workers Party (NSDAP) member Heinz Spanknöbel authority to form an American Nazi organization. The result was the creation of the Friends of New Germany in July 1933, although at least one newspaper article from April 1933 discusses their existence and also states that they held a lease which expired in May of that year, indicating that the group existed before the official date. Their newspaper Amerika Deutsche Post was published until September 1933. An article from the time states that they were mostly German war veterans who supported the current republican government of Germany at the time of writing. Colonel Edwin Emerson acted as a spokesman for the group in April of that year, but later denied this in December. Colonel Emerson claimed that he had no connection to the German government, despite also being a correspondent for no less than 36 German government-controlled papers.

Assistance was given to its formation by the German consul in the City of New York. The organization took over the membership of two older pro-Hitler organizations in the United States, the Free Society of Teutonia and Gau-USA. The new entity was based in New York City, but had a strong presence in Chicago, Illinois.

The Friends of New Germany was led by Spanknöbel and was openly pro-Hitler, and engaged in activities such as storming the German language newspaper New Yorker Staats-Zeitung with the demand that Nazi-sympathetic articles be published, the infiltration of other German-American organizations, and the use of propaganda to counter the boycott of businesses in the heavily German neighborhood of Yorkville, Manhattan. Members wore a uniform, a white shirt and black trousers for men with a black hat festooned with a red symbol. Women members wore a white blouse and a black skirt.

In an internal battle for control of the Friends, Spanknöbel was soon ousted as leader, and in October 1933 he was deported because he had failed to register as a foreign agent. In December 1933, Spanknöbel's bodyguard, Walter Kauf, was sentenced to six months in jail in New Jersey on charges of carrying a concealed weapon. The same month, the Friends's treasurer, Engelberg Roell, was jailed for one day for contempt of court after refusing to hand over the organization's membership to a federal grand jury investigating Nazi activities in the United States. Following his release, Roell agreed to cooperate with federal authorities.

At the same time, Congressman Samuel Dickstein (D-NY) was Chairman of the Committee on Naturalization and Immigration, where he became aware of the substantial number of foreigners legally and illegally entering and residing in the country, and the growing antisemitism along with vast amounts of antisemitic literature being distributed in the country. This led him to investigate independently the activities of Nazis and other fascist groups. This led to the formation of the Special Committee on Un-American Activities Authorized to Investigate National Socialist Propaganda and Certain Other Propaganda Activities. Throughout the rest of 1934, the Committee conducted hearings, bringing before it most of the major figures in the US fascist movement. Dickstein's investigation concluded that the Friends represented a branch of German dictator Adolf Hitler's NSDAP in America.

The organization existed into the mid-1930s with a membership of between 5,000 and 10,000, consisting mostly of German citizens living in America and German emigrants who only recently had become citizens. In December 1935, Rudolf Hess recalled the group's leaders to Germany and ordered all German citizens to leave the Friends of New Germany. By March 1936, Friends of New Germany was dissolved and its membership transferred to the newly-formed German American Bund, the new name being chosen to emphasise the group's American credentials after press criticism that the organisation was unpatriotic. The Bund was to consist only of American citizens of German descent.

== Planned uprising ==
In 1933, California National Guardsman Dietrich Gefken, a member of a secret paramilitary of the Friends, plotted a fascist uprising in southern California cities. Gefken, who'd bragged about killing communists during the Ruhr uprising, planned to raid armories in the region. Based on collected intelligence by Leon L. Lewis, U.S. Navy agents arrested two Marines who were selling rifles and 12,000 rounds of ammunition to local Nazis.

== See also ==
- Camp Wille und Macht – American Nazi camp for boys, 1934 New Jersey
- Silvershirts
- German American Bund
- Free Society of Teutonia
