= Heinz Spanknöbel =

German immigrant who led American Nazi group (1893–1947)

- Born: 27 November 1893; Homberg, Hesse-Nassau, Kingdom of Prussia, German Empire
- Died: 10 March 1947 (aged 53); NKVD Special Camp No. 1, Brandenburg, Allied-occupied Germany
- Known for: Formed and led the pro-Nazi Friends of New Germany

Heinrich "Heinz" Spanknöbel (27 November 1893 – 10 March 1947) was a German immigrant to America who formed, and for a short time led, the pro-Nazi Friends of New Germany as its Bundesleiter.

== Family ==
Heinz was born in Homberg, Germany, to Konrad Spanknöbel (1866–1969) and Christiane Becker (1869–1966). He had an older brother, Karl Adolph (later Charles A. Noble; 6 September 1892, Homberg, Germany – 22 March 1983, Watsontown, Pennsylvania, US) and younger brothers and sisters: Käthe (1897–1970), Anne (1898–1962), Wilhelm (1900–1980), August (1902–1969), Martha (1904–1966), and Frieda (1907–?). In 1918, he married Elsa Fourier (1892–1957) in Würzburg.

== Career ==
In 1920, Spanknöbel was ordained as a minister on the Seventh-day Adventist Church Reform Movement in Würzburg. He was admitted to the US as a minister in 1929, but his relationship with religion was dubious while he was in the country. Spanknöbel was a member of the Free Society of Teutonia and an employee of the Ford Motor Company. Initial support for American fascist organizations came from Germany. In May 1933, Nazi Deputy Führer Rudolf Hess gave Spanknöbel authority to form an American Nazi organization. Shortly thereafter, with help from the German consul in New York City, Spanknöbel formed the Friends of New Germany by merging two older organizations in the United States— the Society of American Friends of Germany (formed from the dissolved Gauleitung-USA or Gau-USA) and the Free Society of Teutonia; which were both small groups with only a few hundred members each. The Friends of New Germany was headquartered in Yorkville, Manhattan, but had a strong presence in Chicago.

The organization led by Spanknöbel was openly pro-Nazi, and engaged in activities such as storming the German language New Yorker Staats-Zeitung with the demand that Nazi-sympathetic articles be published. He attempted to infiltrate and influence other non-political German-American organizations, such as the United German Societies. One of the Friends' early initiatives was to counter, with propaganda, a Jewish boycott of businesses in the heavily German neighborhood of Yorkville.

In an internal battle for control of the Friends, Spanknöbel was ousted as leader and subsequently ordered to be deported in October 1933 since he had failed to register as a foreign agent. At the same time, Congressman Samuel Dickstein's investigation concluded that the Friends represented a branch of German dictator Adolf Hitler's Nazi Party in America. After a federal arrest warrant was issued for him, Spanknöbel boarded the S.S. Europa ocean liner bound for Bremen on 29 October. In December 1933, Spanknöbel's bodyguard, Walter Kauf, was sentenced to six months in jail in New Jersey on charges of carrying a concealed weapon.

Back in Germany, Spanknöbel reportedly became a director of the Propaganda School for Germans Living Abroad. In 1942, a company called Vereinigte Leder- und Lederwarenfabriken Heinz Spanknöbel & Co. [United leather and leather goods factories Heinz Spanknöbel & Co.] was founded in Hohenbruck near Königgrätz in then Sudetenland.

== Death ==
After the occupation by the Soviet military, Spanknöbel was arrested on 4 October 1945 in Dresden by the NKVD secret police. He was held in captivity in the NKVD Special Camp No. 1 near Mühlberg, Brandenburg, where he died of starvation on 10 March 1947.

== See also ==
- German American Bund
