= Free Society of Teutonia =

American Nazi group, 1924 to 1932

Free Society of Teutonia Nationalistic Society of Teutonia Friends of the Hitler Movement
- Merged into: Friends of New Germany
- Formation: October 1924
- Dissolved: October 1932
- Headquarters: Chicago, United States
- Members: 500 (1932)
- Leader: Fritz Gissibl

The Free Society of Teutonia was one of the earliest Nazi organizations in the United States. It was officially a German American organization, but also publicly expressed a strong support for the Nazi movement in Germany and Nazi ideology in general.

== History ==
It was formed in 1924 by four German immigrants, including brothers Fritz, Peter and Andrew Gissibl; both Fritz and Peter Gissibl were reportedly members of the Nazi Party. The organization was originally led by Fritz Gissibl, a non-citizen. From a headquarters in Chicago, the society set about recruiting ethnic Germans who supported right-wing German nationalism.

The Teutonia Society functioned partly as a social club, with meetings frequently ending up in heavy beer drinking sessions. However its activities became increasingly dominated by extremist politics and modeled on those of the SA in Germany; as its membership increased, the society became more vocally antisemitic, anti-communist and opposed to the Treaty of Versailles.

The group changed its name to the Nationalistic Society of Teutonia in 1926, at which point Peter Gissibl was advising members to also seek Nazi Party membership. The group gained a strong, if fairly small following, and was able to establish units in Milwaukee, St. Louis, Missouri, Detroit, New York City, Cincinnati and Newark, New Jersey. The group's treasurer was Fritz Gissibl, who was also the main Nazi Party representative in the United States and who regularly collected money for the Nazis through the Society. A "thank you" letter from Adolf Hitler to the Society would cause a stir during the Second World War when the Gissibl brothers were brought to trial following an FBI investigation.

The group accepted Hitler as its titular leader and members adopted the Nazi salute. The Society changed its name again in October 1932 to become the Friends of the Hitler Movement.

Under orders of German immigrant and German Nazi Party member Heinz Spanknöbel, the Society was dissolved in March 1933. In May 1933, Nazi Deputy Führer Rudolf Hess gave Heinz Spanknöbel authority to form an American Nazi organization. Shortly thereafter, with help from the German consul in New York City, Spanknöbel created the Friends of New Germany by merging two older organizations in the United States, Gau-USA and the Free Society of Teutonia, which were both small groups with only a few hundred members each. The Friends of New Germany in turn formed the basis of the German American Bund in 1936, the latter name being chosen to emphasise the group's American credentials after press criticism that the Society was unpatriotic.

One of the leaders of the Teutonia Society was Walter Kappe. Kappe (b. 1904) arrived in the United States in 1925 and worked in a farm implement factory in Kankakee, Illinois. Later he moved to Chicago and began to write for German language newspapers. Kappe was fluent in English and later became the press secretary for the German American Bund. He founded their paper Deutscher Weckruf und Beobachter (literally translated, "German Wake-Up Call and Observer") and its predecessor Deutsche Zeitung. Deutsche Zeitung was first published in Yorkville, Manhattan in August 1933, and published through 1934 as a weekly. The Deutsche Weckruf und Beobachter began publishing in 1935 and continued as a weekly through 1938.

In 1936, when the German American Bund was established, Kappe organized the AV Publishing Company and five other Bund corporations. Fritz Kuhn ousted Kappe from his position in the Bund seeing him as a dangerous rival. In 1937, Kappe returned to Germany, where he was attached to Abwehr II (the sabotage branch of German intelligence) where he obtained a Naval commission with the rank of lieutenant. He was designated by Adolf Hitler to launch a sabotage operation against the United States shortly after the attack on Pearl Harbor. Known as Operation Pastorius, Kappe recruited men for the mission by reviewing records from the Ausland Institute (German Foreign Institute) of those who were paid to return to Germany from America. He established a sabotage school on the outskirts of Berlin to train the new recruits. Once the sabotage network was established and transferred to America, Kappe planned to slip into the US with a new identity and direct operations. On June 13, 1942, Richard Quirin, George John Dasch, Heinrich Harm Heinck, and Ernst Peter Burger landed on a beach near Amagansett, Long Island, New York on a U-boat. A similar group, consisting of Edward Kerling, Hermann Otto Neubauer, Herbert Hans Haupt, and Werner Thiel, landed on Ponte Vedra Beach, near Jacksonville, Florida on June 17, 1942. However, Dasch and Burger betrayed the operation to the FBI, and no sabotage was carried out. Dasch and Burger were both imprisoned, while all of the other saboteurs were executed. In 1943, the Wehrmacht appointed Kappe as the "connoisseur of American conditions" to the Volksdeutsche Mittelstelle. There, Kappe was likely responsible for drafting guidelines for the special treatment of "German-born prisoners of war from overseas." Kappe was killed in action on the Eastern Front in 1944.

== See also ==
- German American Bund
- Neo-Nazi groups of the United States
- Silver Legion of America
