= List of events at Madison Square Garden =

Coordinates: 40°45′1.75″N 73°59′36.77″W

Since 1879, the four arenas known as Madison Square Garden have hosted many sporting events, concerts, and political rallies.

== Notable firsts ==
- February 12, 1879 - The first artificial ice rink in North America opens at the Garden.
- August 1898 - Nikola Tesla demonstrates the first remote controlled robot using radio control.
- 1902 - The first indoor professional American football game is played. The World Series of Pro Football, as it was called, was the first attempt at professional American football championship games.
- December 11, 1909 - Films made in Kinemacolor, the first successful color motion picture process, are shown for the first time in the United States by George Albert Smith and Charles Urban.
- 1934 - The first college basketball game at the Garden is played, between the University of Notre Dame and New York University.
- February 28, 1940 - Basketball is televised for the first time (Fordham University vs. the University of Pittsburgh).
- March 19, 1954 - Joey Giardello knocks out Willie Tory in round seven at the Garden in the first televised prize boxing fight shown in color.
- February 8, 10, 11, 1979 - The Challenge Cup, a three-game series between the All-Stars of the National Hockey League and the Soviet National Team takes place at the Garden. The Soviets win, two games to one.
- November 1, 1980 -The first Women's World Judo Championship is held at the Gardens, Jane Bridge (UK) wins the gold medal at under 48 kg
- March 31, 1985 - The World Wrestling Federation (WWF, today known as World Wrestling Entertainment or WWE), presents the inaugural WrestleMania. The annual event would return to Madison Square Garden in 1994 and 2004 for WrestleMania X and WrestleMania XX, celebrating the 10th and 20th editions of WrestleMania.
- August 29, 1988 - The WWF presents the first SummerSlam event. The annual events would return to Madison Square Garden in 1991 and 1998.
- June 14, 1994 - The New York Rangers win the Stanley Cup at Madison Square Garden. It is the first time that a Stanley Cup has been won by the Rangers at the Garden.
- October 1995 - Jacky Cheung, Hong Kong singer and the best selling Asian artist in the mid-1990s, is the first Asian artist to perform at the Paramount, Madison Square Garden. His two-show performance in October 1995 is part of his 100-show world tour that year.
- June 29, 1997 - The New York Liberty professional women's basketball team plays its first home game - the first WNBA game to be played at Madison Square Garden.
- November 17, 2002 - World Wrestling Entertainment holds the first ever Elimination chamber match at Survivor Series.
- March 1, 2003 - Quinnipiac University defeats the University of Connecticut 4–3 in the first college hockey game played at Madison Square Garden since 1977.
- July 13 & 15, 2007 - Popular Boston-based indie band Dispatch sells out MSG for three nights in a row and became the first independent band to either headline or sell out MSG.
- In 2014, the NCAA basketball tournament comes to the current Garden for the first time, when it hosts the East Regional semifinals and final. These were the first NCAA Tournament games played in the Five Boroughs in 53 years; the current incarnation of MSG had been one of the few big-city arenas to have never hosted an NCAA Tournament game. The old Garden had hosted 71 NCAA Tournament games in its history, including seven Final Fours.
- On March 17–19, 2016, the NCAA Division I Wrestling Championships were held for the first time at MSG.
- October 21, 2016 - The semifinals of the 2016 League of Legends World Championship are held for the first time at MSG.
- November 12, 2016 - UFC 205: Alvarez vs. McGregor is the first UFC event held in NYC. Breaks MSG gate record and Conor McGregor becomes the first fighter in UFC history to hold two world titles in different weight classes simultaneously by defeating Eddie Alvarez for the lightweight title.
- July 21–August 6, 2017 - Phish plays the longest consecutive residency held by a single artist, topping at 13 nights with zero repeats. Over this run titled 'The Baker's Dozen', they play 237 songs over a span of 26 sets.
- April 6, 2019 - Ring of Honor and New Japan Pro-Wrestling hosts their first event in the venue called G1 Supercard.
- June 20, 2021 - The American rock band Foo Fighters holds the first concert since the beginning of the COVID-19 pandemic.

== Political and social events ==
- August 13, 1920 Marcus Garvey chairs a meeting of the Universal Negro Improvement Association. The event results in the signing of the Declaration of Rights of the Negro People of the World which designates Red, Black and Green as the colors of people of African ancestry worldwide.
- The 1924, 1976, 1980, and 1992 Democratic National Conventions were held at MSG.
- On October 31, 1936, Franklin D. Roosevelt delivers his last speech before that year's presidential election. In it, he criticizes the interests who opposed the New Deal, stating, "I welcome their hatred."
- On February 20, 1939, a large German American Bund convention is held, prompting riots and protests in and around the arena by American Jews and others. 20,000 Nazi supporters attended.
- Song Mei-ling, the First Lady of the Republic of China would speak to a crowd of nearly 20,000 people at Madison Square on March 2, 1943. Also present were Wendell Willkie, T.V. Soong, Thomas J. Watson who founded IBM, and John D. Rockefeller Jr.
- Former Republican Party presidential candidate Wendell Willkie leads 20,000 African Americans on June 7, 1943, the largest Civil Rights rally of its time, in calling for equal rights and for victory in the war against Hitler.
- On January 10, 1944, the Daily Worker, newspaper of the Communist Party USA, holds an event at the Garden to mark its 20th anniversary.
- President John F. Kennedy's 45th birthday celebration takes place at the Garden on May 19, 1962. During the event, Marilyn Monroe sings her now infamous Happy Birthday, Mr. President.
- On October 24, 1968, George Wallace during his presidential campaign running under the American Independent Party, held a rally with 20,000 spectators showing up.
- On July 1, 1982, Rev. and Mr. Sun Myung Moon hold a Blessing Ceremony in the Garden for 2075 couples. This event attracts much public and media attention (including a story in Life), often being called a "mass wedding."
- The 2004 Republican National Convention at MSG marked the first time that the Republican party held their convention in New York City.
- On September 28, 2014, the prime minister of India, Narendra Modi, addresses a congregation organized by NRIs living in the United States.
- The Garden is the site for a Catholic Mass said by Pope Francis during his first visit to New York City and the United States as Pontiff on September 25, 2015.
- Donald Trump holds a rally for his presidential campaign in 2024 on October 27, 2024.
- The Wedding of Taylor Swift and Travis Kelce took place on July 3, 2026. The event drew immense media attention from the public but also fans of the couple. The wedding was a high-security event attended by roughly 1,000 prominent figures from the entertainment and sports worlds.
- On August 29, 2026, an event is held featuring Mohan Bhagwat, the sarsanghchalak (transl. Supreme Leader) of the Rashtriya Swayamsevak Sangh (RSS), an Indian Hindutva paramilitary organisation, prompting protests, condemnation by mayor Zohran Mamdani, and a call by the United States Commission on International Religious Freedom (USCIRF) for sanctions against the RSS.

== Boxing ==
Madison Square Garden was one of the primary centers of the boxing universe throughout its history and in all of its incarnations before Las Vegas became the sport's main center starting in the 1980s. However, MSG still hosts many significant fights. Some of the historic fights held at MSG have been:

- October 26, 1951 — Joe Louis vs. Rocky Marciano
  - The unbeaten Marciano, who would become heavyweight champion the following year, knocked out a clearly past-his-prime Louis in the 8th round. After the loss, Louis retired for the second time, this time for good.
- Two of the three Ali–Frazier fights:
  - March 8, 1971 — Fight of the Century
    - One of the most hyped fights in history, with both heavyweight champion Frazier and challenger Ali entering unbeaten. Frazier won by unanimous decision.
  - January 28, 1974 — Ali-Frazier II
    - Ali avenges his loss to Frazier, also by unanimous decision.
- June 13, 1986 — Héctor Camacho vs. Edwin Rosario
  - A classic showdown between Puerto Rican stars Héctor Camacho and Edwin Rosario for Camacho's lightweight title, with Camacho retaining his title by a controversial split decision.
- July 11, 1996 — Riddick Bowe vs. Andrew Golota
  - Though ahead on points, Golota was penalized several times for low blows, and was finally disqualified in the seventh round after a volley of punches to Bowe's testicles. Seconds after Golota was disqualified, Bowe's entourage rushed the ring, attacked Golota with a two way radio, and assaulted Golota's 74-year-old trainer Lou Duva. The entourage began rioting, fighting with spectators, staff and policemen alike, resulting in a number of injuries before they were forced out of the arena in what evolved into a lengthy televised ring spectacle.
- September 29, 2001 — The final bout of the Middleweight World Championship Series, in which Bernard Hopkins defeated Félix Trinidad by 12th-round TKO to claim the undisputed title.
- October 2, 2004 — Félix Trinidad vs. Ricardo Mayorga
  - Trinidad returned from a two-year layoff and defeated Ricardo Mayorga by TKO in the 8th round.
- November 8, 2008 — Joe Calzaghe vs. Roy Jones Jr.
  - In what proved to be his last professional bout, the unbeaten Joe Calzaghe won a unanimous decision over Roy Jones Jr.
- June 1, 2019 — Anthony Joshua vs. Andy Ruiz Jr.
  - After coming in as a 25-1 underdog, Ruiz won the match via technical knockout in the seventh round, ending Joshua's undefeated record and becoming the new unified heavyweight champion.
- April 30, 2022 — Katie Taylor vs. Amanda Serrano
  - First women's boxing match to headline Madison Square Garden. In what was described as the 'biggest women's fight of all time', Taylor defeated Serrano by split decision, remaining the undisputed lightweight champion.
- July 11, 2025 — Katie Taylor vs. Amanda Serrano III
  - The third of three title fights between Taylor and Serrano. The first boxing event at Madison Square Garden to feature an all women's card. Taylor defeated Serrano by majority decision, remaining the undisputed lightweight champion.

== Mixed martial arts ==
After the New York State Athletic Commission authorized mixed martial events in 2016, the MSG has hosted multiple major bouts:

- November 12, 2016 — UFC 205: Alvarez vs. McGregor
  - Conor McGregor defeated Eddie Alvarez for the UFC Lightweight Championship.
  - Tyron Woodley fought Stephen Thompson for the UFC Welterweight Championship. The fight resulted in a majority draw.
  - Joanna Jędrzejczyk defeated Karolina Kowalkiewicz for the UFC Women's Strawweight Championship.
- June 24, 2017 — Bellator NYC/Bellator 180
  - Chael Sonnen defeated Wanderlei Silva.
  - Matt Mitrione defeated Fedor Emelianenko.
  - Brent Primus defeated Michael Chandler.
- November 4, 2017 — UFC 217: Bisping vs. St-Pierre
  - Georges St-Pierre defeated Michael Bisping for the UFC Middleweight Championship.
  - T.J. Dillashaw defeated Cody Garbrandt for the UFC Bantamweight Championship.
  - Rose Namajunas defeated Joanna Jędrzejczyk for the UFC Women's Strawweight Championship.
- November 3, 2018 — UFC 230: Cormier vs. Lewis
  - Daniel Cormier defeated Derrick Lewis for the UFC Heavyweight Championship.
- June 14, 2019 — Bellator 222
  - Rory MacDonald defeated Neiman Gracie for the Bellator Welterweight World Championship.
- November 2, 2019 — UFC 244: Masvidal vs. Diaz
  - Jorge Masvidal defeated Nate Diaz for the symbolic "BMF" Championship.
- November 6, 2021 — UFC 268: Usman vs. Covington 2
  - Kamaru Usman defeated Colby Covington for the UFC Welterweight Championship.
  - Rose Namajunas defeated Zhang Weili for the UFC Women's Strawweight Championship.
- November 12, 2022 — UFC 281: Adesanya vs. Pereira
  - Alex Pereira defeated Israel Adesanya for the UFC Middleweight Championship.
  - Zhang Weili defeated Carla Esparza for the UFC Women's Strawweight Championship.
- November 11, 2023 — UFC 295: Procházka vs. Pereira
  - Alex Pereira defeated Jiří Procházka for the vacant UFC Light Heavyweight Championship.
  - Tom Aspinall defeated Sergei Pavlovich for the Interim UFC Heavyweight Championship.
- November 16, 2024 — UFC 309: Jones vs. Miocic
  - Jon Jones defeated Stipe Miocic for the UFC Heavyweight Championship.
- November 15, 2025 — UFC 322: Della Maddalena vs. Makhachev
  - Islam Makhachev defeated Jack Della Maddalena for the UFC Welterweight Championship.
  - Valentina Shevchenko defeated Zhang Weili for the UFC Women's Flyweight Championship.
- November 14, 2026 — UFC 334: Gane vs. Hokit
  - Ciryl Gane defeated Josh Hokit for the UFC Heavyweight Championship.
  - Kayla Harrison defeated Amanda Nunes for the UFC Women's Bantamweight Championship.

== Religious ==
- May 15, 1957 — 1957 New York Crusade
  - Evangelist Billy Graham began his 16-week religious revival at Madison Square Garden. Martin Luther King Jr. gave the invocation at the Garden in one of the subsequent meetings.
- 2005-2014 — Lakewood Church's Night of Hope
  - Pastor Joel Osteen has brought attracted 18,000 people to his religious sermons at Madison Square Garden seven times.
