= Madison Square Garden (disambiguation) =

Madison Square Garden is a sports and entertainment venue in New York City, United States.

Madison Square Garden may also refer to:

== Former iterations of the arena ==
- Madison Square Garden (1879)
- Madison Square Garden (1890)
- Madison Square Garden (1925)

== Arts and entertainment ==
- Madison Square Garden (film), a 1932 American Pre-Code drama film
- MSG Network, a TV network originally known as Madison Square Garden Network
- USA Network, known as Madison Square Garden Sports Network from 1977 to 1980

== See also ==
- MSG (disambiguation)
- Madison Square Garden Bowl, a former outdoor arena in Queens, New York
- Madison Square Garden Entertainment, owner of Madison Square Garden and other properties
- Madison Square Garden Sports, managing several sports teams
- Madison Square Garden Towers, a never-built pair of skyscrapers proposed near Madison Square Garden
- Boston Garden, a former arena in Boston, Massachusetts, originally named "Boston Madison Square Garden"
- New York Coliseum, originally known as the "Madison Square Garden Annex" in planning stages
