= 2024 Donald Trump rally at Madison Square Garden =

American presidential campaign rally

- Part of Donald Trump 2024 presidential campaign
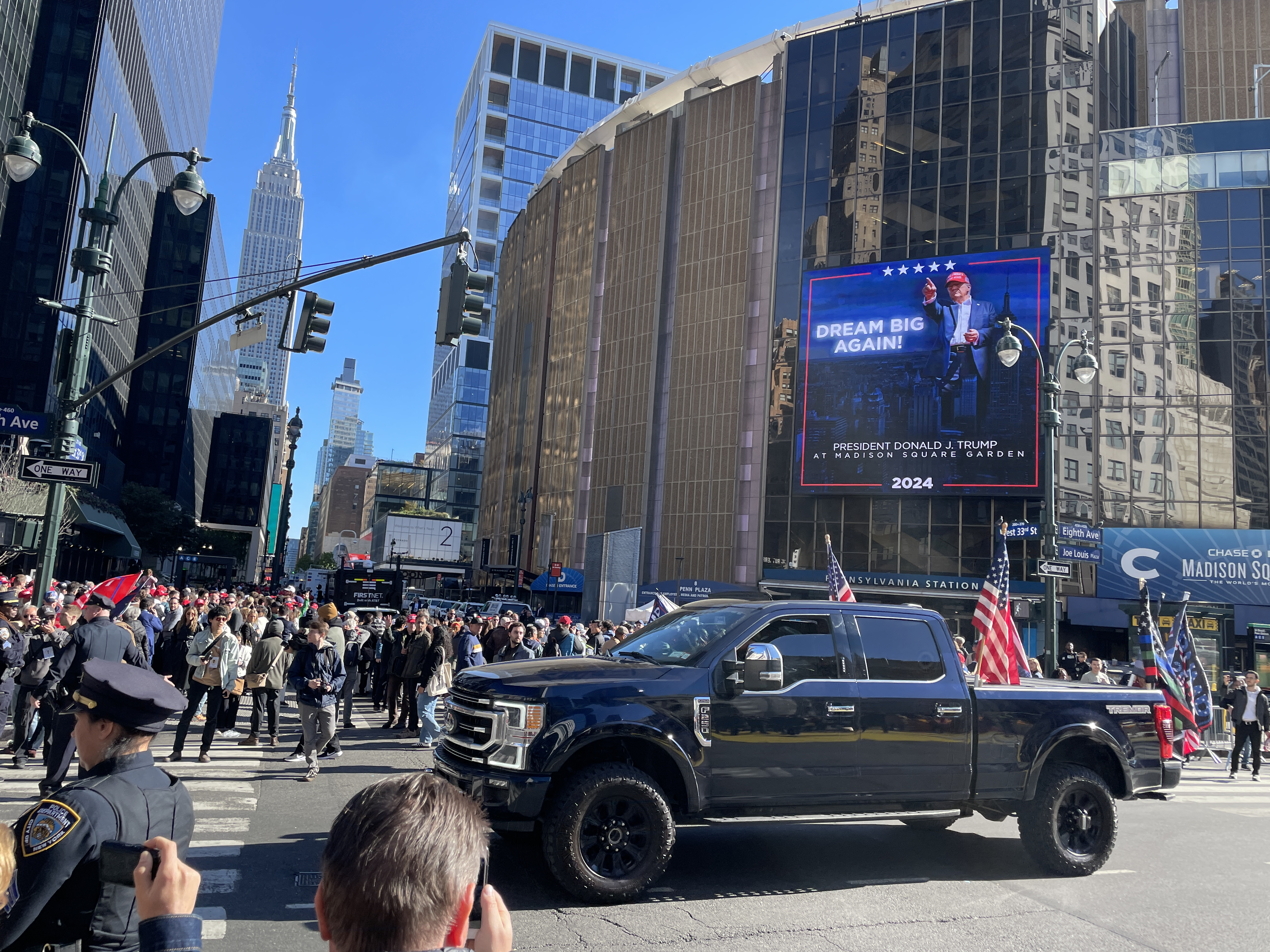
- Date: October 27, 2024
- Venue: Madison Square Garden
- Location: New York City

On October 27, 2024, Republican presidential candidate Donald Trump hosted a campaign rally at Madison Square Garden in New York City. The main event was a 78-minute speech from Trump, which his campaign characterized as his closing message. Multiple people associated with Trump, such as Donald Trump Jr., Elon Musk, Rudy Giuliani, and Tucker Carlson, as well as his running mate JD Vance, gave speeches before and after Trump.

Particular attention was paid to remarks by comedian Tony Hinchcliffe, who spoke prior to Trump and made jokes widely considered offensive toward Latinos (including Puerto Ricans), Jews, Palestinians, and Black people. The Democratic National Committee projected messaging tying Trump to Adolf Hitler onto the exterior of the building while Trump was speaking, referencing comments he allegedly made praising Hitler's generals. Some Democrats also drew comparisons between the rally and the 1939 Nazi rally at the old Madison Square Garden.

Despite speculation that the event could swing the outcome of the presidential election in favor of Harris, Trump went on to win nine days after the rally.

== Background ==
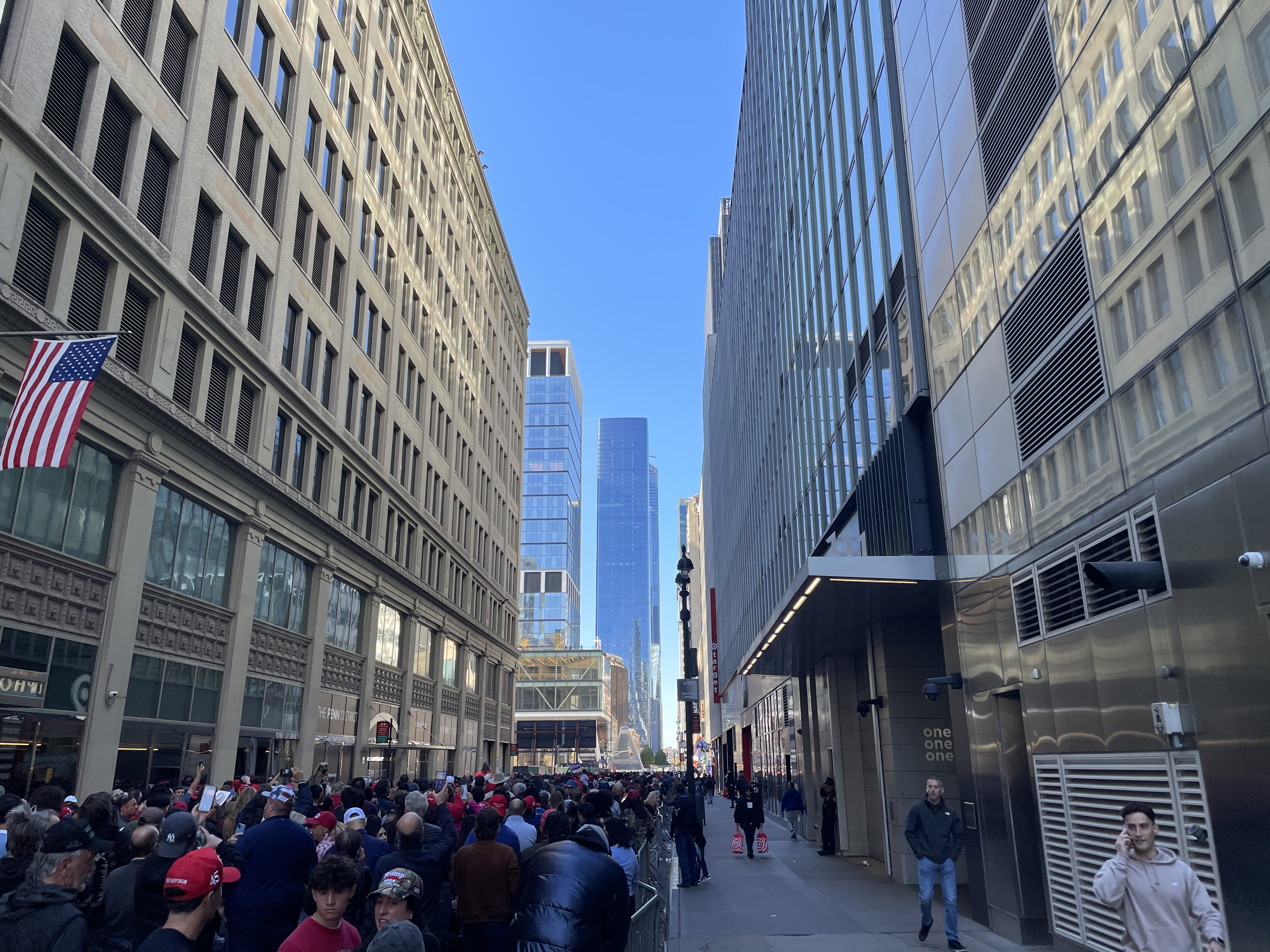
People waiting for the rally

The rally was held around a week before election day for the 2024 United States presidential election. The election was seen as very close, with polls unable to determine a favored candidate. Heading into the rally, Trump was increasingly being described as a "fascist," particularly as former top Trump advisors Mark Milley, John Kelly, and Jim Mattis had recently described Trump as such.

New York native Donald Trump had long hoped to hold a rally at Madison Square Garden. His campaign announced the event on October 9. The Trump campaign's decision to host a rally in a heavily Democratic city was perceived as an attempt to project confidence, overcome the urban-rural divide, and signal a political realignment in American politics.

== Program and speakers ==
New York reported that on the night of the rally a campaign advisor said the speakers' remarks had not been screened in advance, though The Bulwark reported the campaign had asked speakers to submit their speeches for review in advance and had asked one speaker to omit a remark. David Rem, introduced as a childhood friend of Trump, referred to Trump's opponent Kamala Harris as "the devil" and "the Antichrist." Hulk Hogan said during his speech: "I don't see no stinkin' Nazis in here. I don't see no stinkin' domestic terrorists in here. The only thing I see here are a bunch of hard-working men and women that are real Americans, brother." Trump campaign advisor Stephen Miller's call that "America is for Americans and Americans only" drew comparisons to the 1939 Nazi rally at Madison Square Garden. Miller responded that people making such comparisons were "spitting on the graves of my Jewish ancestors". Notable speakers included:

- Tucker Carlson
- Byron Donalds
- Tulsi Gabbard
- Rudy Giuliani
- Lee Greenwood
- Alina Habba
- Michael Harris Jr.
- Tony Hinchcliffe
- Hulk Hogan
- Mike Johnson
- Tiffany Justice
- Robert F. Kennedy Jr.
- Scott LoBaido
- Howard Lutnick
- Phil McGraw
- Mary Millben
- Stephen Miller
- Elon Musk
- Vivek Ramaswamy
- Brooke Rollins
- Sid Rosenberg
- Dan Scavino
- Elise Stefanik
- Melania Trump
- Donald Trump Jr.
- Eric Trump
- Lara Trump
- JD Vance
- Dana White
- Steve Witkoff

The Trump campaign introduced a new slogan at the rally: "Trump Will Fix It." Grant Cardone, a conservative influencer and investor, remarked that Harris "and her pimp handlers will destroy our country".

=== Tony Hinchcliffe ===
I don't know if you guys know this, but there's literally a floating island of garbage in the middle of the ocean right now. I think it's called Puerto Rico.

— Tony Hinchcliffe

Tony Hinchcliffe, a comedian and podcast host, delivered a stand-up routine at the beginning of the rally and made several jokes based on racist stereotypes. He referred to Puerto Rico as a "floating island of garbage." and said "these Latinos, they love making babies, they do. There's no pulling out. They don't do that, they come inside, just like they do to our country." He joked that he and a Black audience member had "carved watermelons together" at a Halloween party, referring to a longstanding stereotype. He compared the Israeli–Palestinian conflict to a game of rock paper scissors, mentioning Palestinians throwing rocks and saying that "Jews have a hard time throwing that paper," referring to stereotypes of Jewish people as greedy.

The Bulwark reported that Hinchcliffe had submitted a written draft of his speech to the campaign beforehand, to be loaded into a teleprompter. The original draft contained a joke referring to Kamala Harris as a "cunt", but campaign officials told him to remove it from his routine. The campaign stated that they did not spot the joke about Puerto Rico because Hinchcliffe had ad-libbed it. Hinchcliffe had reportedly publicly practiced the joke in a comedy club the day before. The Atlantic reported that Trump campaign staff members Alex Bruesewitz and Justin Caporale, the campaign's head of planning and production, were behind the decision to offer Hinchcliffe a speaking opportunity.

== Response ==
Donald Trump said it was an "honor to be involved" and called the event "an absolute lovefest".

Past Trump critics Megyn Kelly and Nikki Haley, who endorsed Trump in the 2024 campaign, separately made statements criticizing the fact that an overwhelming amount of the rally's speakers were men; Kelly called the rally speakers' rhetoric "totally counterproductive" to women voters while Haley commented, "This bromance and this masculinity stuff, it borders on edgy to the point that it's going to make women uncomfortable."

Coverage of the rally characterized the speakers' remarks as misogynistic and racist. Democratic vice-presidential nominee Tim Walz and Hillary Clinton compared the rally to the 1939 Nazi rally at Madison Square Garden. Comedian Tony Hinchcliffe's remarks were widely criticized as racist, including by prominent politicians such as Walz, who called him a "jackwad", and Representative Alexandria Ocasio-Cortez, who is of Puerto Rican ancestry. Representative Ritchie Torres, also of Puerto Rican ancestry, said that he was "tempted to call Hinchcliffe racist garbage but doing so would be an insult to garbage."

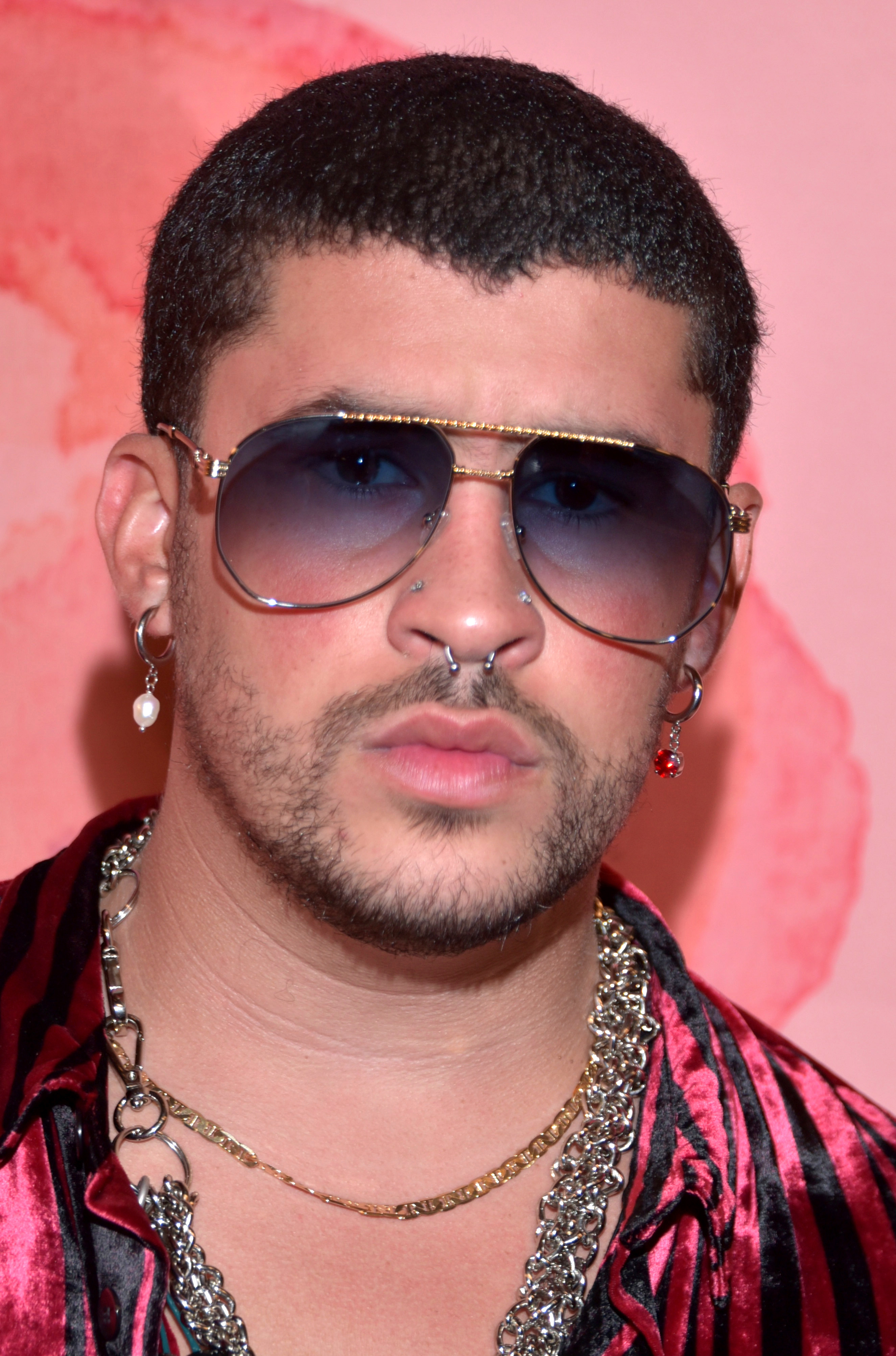
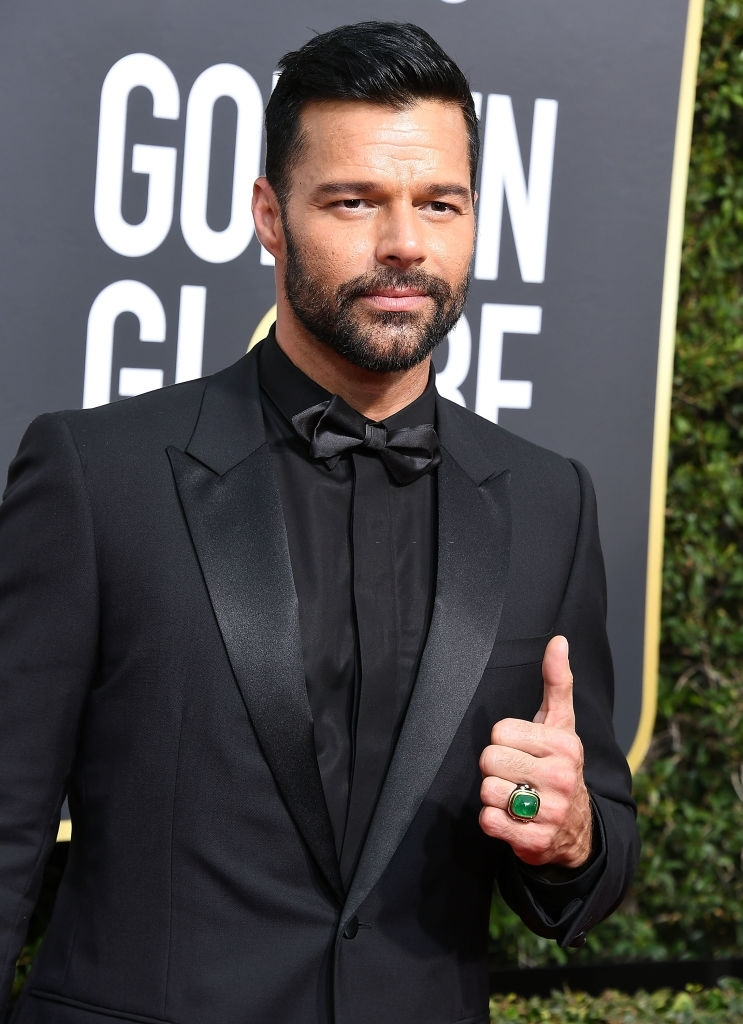
Following the rally, Puerto Rican entertainers Bad Bunny (left) and Ricky Martin (right) expressed support for presidential candidate Kamala Harris.

In response to Hinchcliffe's comments about Puerto Rico, many Puerto Rican celebrities, including musicians Bad Bunny, Ricky Martin, Don Omar, Jennifer Lopez, and Luis Fonsi expressed support for Trump's rival Kamala Harris after the rally. While Bad Bunny allowed his music to be used for the Biden campaign in 2020, he had previously refrained from endorsing a candidate in 2024, focusing his activism on issues pertaining to the island of Puerto Rico and expressing a desire to be uninvolved in politics. Musician Nicky Jam, who previously spoke at a rally supporting Trump, withdrew his endorsement. The large Puerto Rican population in Pennsylvania, a swing state in the 2024 United States presidential election, prompted Trump campaign senior advisor Danielle Alvarez to say that it did not reflect the views of Trump or the campaign, a move which The New York Times described as a departure from the "Trump ethos ... to never apologize, never admit error and try to ignore controversy".

The chair of the Republican Party of Puerto Rico, Angel M. Cintrón, called on Trump to apologize for Hinchcliffe's comments, saying he will withhold his support until an apology is given. The archbishop of the Roman Catholic Archdiocese of San Juan de Puerto Rico, Roberto O. Gonzalez Nieves, criticized Hinchcliffe for the comment and responded to the defense that it was a joke, saying "I enjoy a good joke...However, humor has its limits. It should not insult or denigrate the dignity and sacredness of people. Hinchcliffe's remarks do not only provoke sinister laughter but hatred."

Comedian and talk show host Jon Stewart defended Hinchcliffe, saying, "Obviously, in retrospect, having a roast comedian come to a political rally a week before election day and roasting a key demographic... probably not the best decision by the campaign politically, but to be fair, the guy's just really doing what he does."

President Biden told the Latino group Voto Latino in a video call following the rally, "The only garbage I see floating out there is his supporters — his — his demonization of Latinos is unconscionable, and it's un-American" according to a transcript prepared by the official White House stenographers. The transcript later released by the White House press office, however, rendered the quote with an apostrophe, reading "supporter's" rather than "supporters," which aides said pointed to Biden criticizing Hinchcliffe, not Trump's supporters.

Republican politicians in Florida running for reelection expressed concern about Hinchcliffe's comments. Senator Rick Scott tweeted "It's not funny and it's not true". María Elvira Salazar, a House member who represents a district in South Florida, described Hinchcliffe's comments as "disgusting".

New York City mayor Eric Adams denied that Trump is a fascist and added that "anyone suggesting that is minimizing the actual acts of a fascist — Adolf Hitler. Six million Jews were killed in the Holocaust." Jewish former Democratic state assemblyman Dov Hikind, who switched to the Republican Party in 2023, argued that "this is their last effort to picture Donald Trump as Nazi-like. It's absolute insanity, and it's not going to work." Matt Brooks, CEO of the Republican Jewish Coalition, said that "Comparing President Trump – who has Jewish children and grandchildren – to Hitler is shameful, and trivializes the Holocaust."

On October 30, in response to Biden's gaffe, Trump held a campaign event while driving a garbage truck and wearing a garbage worker vest. Staff from both campaigns stated that they believed the event would remind voters more of Hinchcliffe than of Biden's gaffe. HuffPost spoke with Puerto Rican voters in Pennsylvania after the event, one of whom stated that he saw Trump's garbage truck campaign stop as an endorsement of Hinchcliffe's remark and an additional insult.

There was some speculation that the rally could hamper Trump's chances of winning. However, any backlash didn't materialize in the election results, as Trump would win the presidency. Trump also performed better in New York in the presidential election than any Republican nominee since George H. W. Bush in 1988. He also received the highest share of the Latino vote for a Republican candidate since George W. Bush's 2004 presidential campaign.

== See also ==
- 2024 United States presidential straw poll in Puerto Rico
- List of events at Madison Square Garden
- List of post–2016 election Donald Trump rallies
- Timeline of the 2024 United States presidential election
