= Madison Square Garden Towers =

Residential skyscraper in Manhattan, New York

Madison Square Garden
- Towers I & II
- Interactive map of the Madison Square Garden area

General information
- Status: vision
- Type: Residential
- Location: Madison Square Garden; New York City, New York; United States
- Coordinates: 40.752°N 73.993°W

Height
- Roof: Tower I 1,400 ft (426.7 m); Tower II 1,400 ft (426.7 m)

Technical details
- Floor count: 112
- Floor area: 1,400,000 square feet (130,100 m^{2})

Design and construction
- Architect: Skidmore, Owings & Merrill
- Main contractor: Vornado Realty Trust

The Madison Square Garden Towers were the name of proposed twin 1,400 ft-tall (427 m) residential skyscrapers that were to be constructed north of Madison Square Garden in Midtown Manhattan, New York City. The project featured a complex of seven buildings, including a stadium and a new Penn Station. The cost of the project was US$14 billion. The architects Norman Foster and David Childs, and the architectural firm Skidmore, Owings and Merrill were designing the project. The owners were Stephen Ross of Related Cos. and Steven Roth of Vornado Realty Trust. The towers would have risen to be two of the tallest structures in the Midtown Manhattan skyline, with one rising higher than the Empire State Building, currently one of New York's tallest buildings at 1,250 feet (381 m) and would also have been higher than the roof, though not the spire, of One World Trade Center. The towers are essentially canceled as Madison Square Garden went ahead with renovations of the current arena, rather than a relocation that would have made the towers possible.

== See also ==
- List of tallest buildings in New York City
