= Madison Square Garden (1925) =

Former arena in Manhattan, New York

Madison Square Garden III
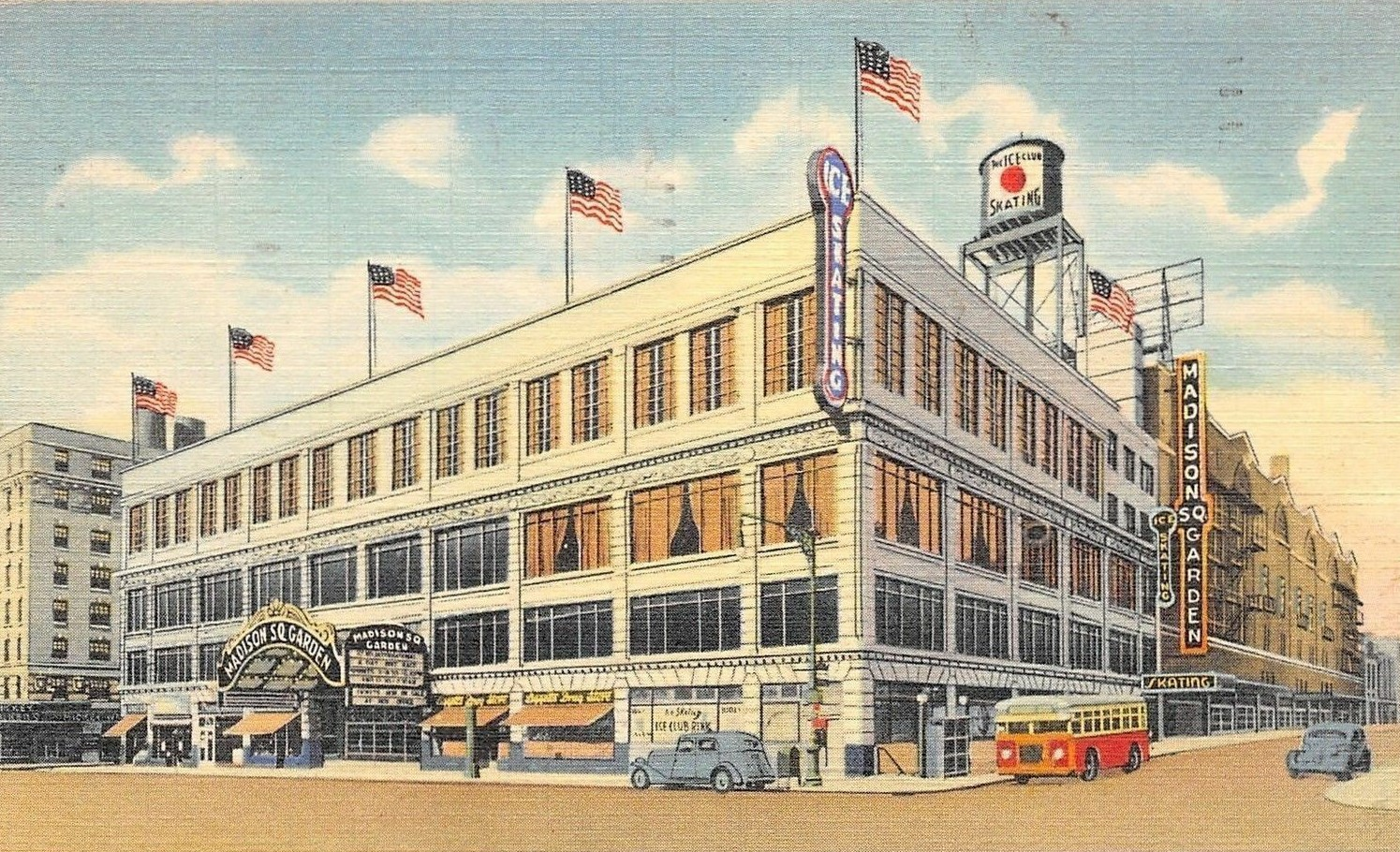
- 1941 postcard depicting the building
- Interactive map of Madison Square Garden III
- Full name: Madison Square Garden
- Location: Manhattan, New York
- Coordinates: 40.7624°N 73.9877°W
- Owner: Tex Rickard
- Operator: Tex Rickard
- Capacity: Basketball: 18,496; Ice hockey: 15,925

Construction
- Groundbreaking: January 9, 1925 (101 years ago)
- Opened: December 15, 1925 (100 years ago)
- Closed: February 13, 1968 (58 years ago)
- Demolished: 1968–1969
- Architect: Thomas W. Lamb

Tenants
- New York/Brooklyn Americans (NHL) (1925–1942); New York Rangers (NHL) (1926–1968); New York (Original) Celtics (ABL) (1927–1928); St. John's Redmen (NCAA) (1930s–1968); National Invitation Tournament (1938–1967); New York Knicks (BAA/NBA) (1946–1968)

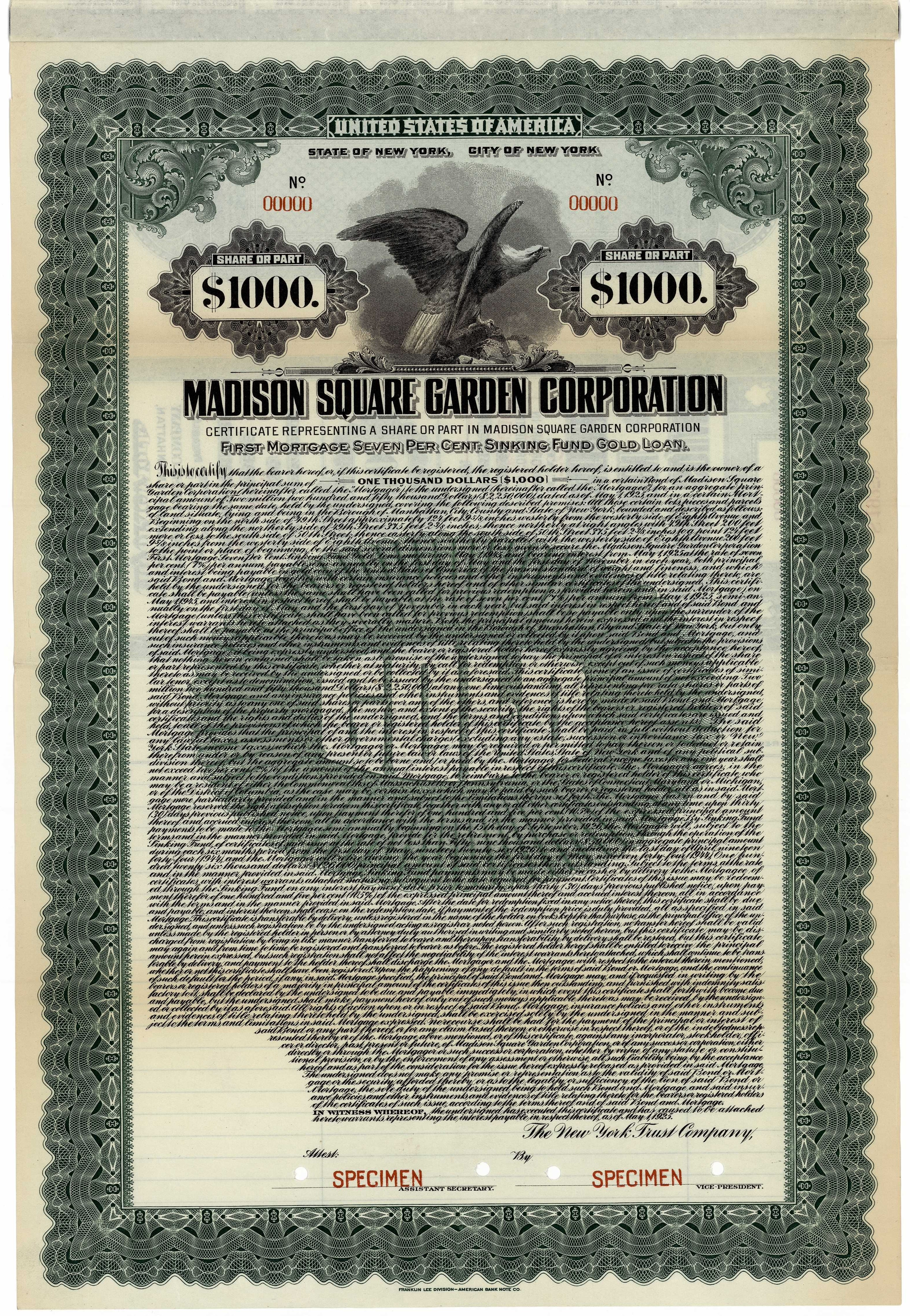
Gold loan specimen of the Madison Square Corp., issued 1. May 1925

Madison Square Garden (MSG III) was an indoor arena in New York City, the third bearing that name. Built in 1925 and closed in 1968, it was located on the west side of Eighth Avenue between 49th and 50th streets in Manhattan, on the site of the city's trolley-car barns. It was the first Garden that was not located near Madison Square. MSG III was the home of the New York Rangers of the National Hockey League and the New York Knicks of the National Basketball Association, and also hosted numerous boxing matches, the Millrose Games, the National Invitation Tournament, Ringling Bros. and Barnum & Bailey, concerts, and other events. In 1968 it was demolished and its role and name passed to the fourth Madison Square Garden, which stands at the site of the original Penn Station. One Worldwide Plaza was built on the arena's former 50th Street location.

== History ==
Groundbreaking on the third Madison Square Garden took place on January 9, 1925. Designed by the theater architect Thomas W. Lamb, it was built at the cost of $4.75 million in 349 days by boxing promoter Tex Rickard, who assembled backers he called his "600 millionaires" to fund the project. The new arena was dubbed "The House That Tex Built." In contrast to the ornate towers of Stanford White's second Garden, the exterior of MSG III was a simple box. Its most distinctive feature was the ornate marquee above the main entrance, with seemingly endless abbreviations (Tomw., V/S, Rgrs, Tonite, Thru, etc.) Even the name of the arena was abbreviated, to "Madison Sq. Garden".

The arena, which opened on December 15, 1925, was 200 feet (61 m) by 375 feet (114 m), with seating on three levels, and a maximum capacity of 18,496 spectators for boxing. It had poor sight lines, especially for hockey, and fans sitting virtually anywhere behind the first row of the side balcony could count on having some portion of the ice obstructed. The poor ventilation and allowed smoking often caused haze in the upper portions of the Garden.

Madison Square Garden III was managed by Rickard, John S. Hammond, William F. Carey, General John Reed Kilpatrick, Ned Irish and Irving Mitchell Felt. It was eventually replaced by the fourth Madison Square Garden.

== Events ==
=== Sports ===
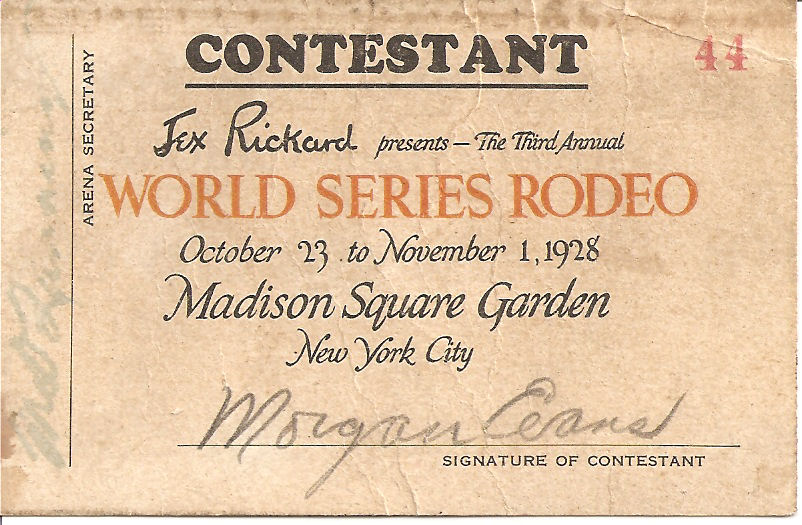
Bulldogging champion Cowboy Morgan Evans competition chit at Madison Square Garden's 1928 World Series Rodeo

==== Boxing ====
Boxing was Madison Square Garden III's principal claim to fame. The first bout took place on December 11, 1925, a week before its official opening, as world light heavyweight champion Paul Berlenbach defended his title against challenger Jack Delaney before more than 22,000 fans.

On January 17, 1941, 23,190 people witnessed Fritzie Zivic's successful welterweight title defense against Henry Armstrong, still the largest crowd at any of the Gardens.

==== Hockey ====
The New York Rangers, owned by the Garden's owner Tex Rickard, got their name from a play on words involving his name: Tex's Rangers. However, the Rangers were not the first NHL team to play at the Garden; the New York Americans had begun play in 1925 – and officially opened the Garden in front of 17,000 by losing to the Montreal Canadiens, 3-1 – Shorty Green of the Americans was the first player to score a goal in the arena. The Americans were so tremendously successful that Rickard wanted his own team. The Rangers were founded in 1926 and played their first game in the Garden on November 16, 1926. Both teams played at the Garden until the Americans suspended operations in 1942 due to World War II. In the meantime, the Rangers had usurped the Americans with their own success, winning three Stanley Cups between 1928 and 1940. The refusal of the Garden's management to allow the postwar resurrection of the Americans team was one popular theory underlying the Curse of 1940, which supposedly prevented the Rangers from winning another Stanley Cup until 1994. Another alleged cause of "The Curse" stemmed from manager Kilpatrick burning the Garden's mortgage papers in the bowl of the Stanley Cup, made possible by receipts from the 1940 Cup run. Hockey purists believed that the trophy had been "defiled", leading to the Rangers' woes.

The New York Rovers, a farm team of the Rangers, played in the Garden on Sunday afternoons, while the Rangers played on Wednesday and Sunday nights. Tommy Lockhart managed the Rovers games and introduced on-ice promotions such as racing model aircraft and bicycles around the arena, figure skating acts Shipstads & Johnson Ice Follies and Sonja Henie, and a skating grizzly bear. The fourth floor of the Garden had a second sheet of ice, used for public skating, recreational hockey, and as the Rangers' practice facility.

==== Basketball ====
The first professional basketball game was played in the 50th Street Garden on December 6, 1925, nine days before the arena officially opened. It pitted the Original Celtics against the Washington Palace Five. The Celtics won 35–31. The Original Celtics would also later become an official tenant for this rendition of the Madison Square Garden after previously becoming one in their first two professional basketball league seasons for the second rendition of the Madison Square Garden for the 1927–28 season of the American Basketball League before later leaving due to a combination of not having high crowd results when compared to other cities seeing the Original Celtics play and the ABL wanting to break up the team for being "too strong" against the rest of the league by comparison. The New York Knicks debuted there in 1946, although if there was an important college game, they played in the 69th Regiment Armory. Due to other event bookings in the arena, all their home games during the 1951, 1952 and 1953 NBA Finals were played at the Armory; thus MSG III never hosted an NBA Finals game. MSG III hosted the NBA All-Star Game in 1954, 1955 and 1968.

In 1931, a highly successful college basketball triple header raised money for Mayor Jimmy Walker's Unemployment Relief Fund. In 1934, Ned Irish began promoting a successful series of college basketball double headers at the Garden featuring a mix of local and national teams. MSG III began hosting the National Invitation Tournament annually in 1938, and hosted seven NCAA men's basketball championship finals between 1943 and 1950. On February 28, 1940, Madison Square Garden hosted the first televised basketball games in a Fordham-Pitt and Georgetown-NYU doubleheader. A point shaving scandal involving games played at the Garden led the NCAA to reduce its use of the Garden, and caused some schools, including 1950 NCAA and NIT Champion City College of New York (CCNY), to be banned from playing there.

==== Professional wrestling ====
Capitol Wrestling Corporation—along with its successor, the World Wide Wrestling Federation—promoted professional wrestling at the Garden during its last two decades. Toots Mondt and Jess McMahon owned CWC, which initially promoted tag team wrestling. Throughout the 1950s and 1960s, Mondt and McMahon were successful at promoting ethnic heroes of Puerto Rican or Italian descent.

Two historic wrestling events took place at MSG III. On May 17, 1963, Bruno Sammartino defeated "Nature Boy" Buddy Rogers, via submission, in 48 seconds, to become the second ever WWWF World Heavyweight Champion. On November 19, 1957, the Dr. Jerry Graham & Dick the Bruiser vs. Edouard Carpentier & Argentina Rocca main event led to a race riot involving Italian and Puerto Rican fans of Carpentier and Rocca. After the riot, New York City nearly banned professional wrestling and children under the age of 14 were prohibited from attending.

==== Cycling ====
From 1925 until 1961, Madison Square Garden hosted the Six Days of New York, an annual six-day racing event of track cycling. Upon its final running, it was the longest-running series in the world with 73 editions.

=== Other entertainment ===
==== Circus ====
The Ringling Bros. and Barnum & Bailey Circus debuted at the second Garden in 1919, and moved to the third Garden in 1926 where it opened each spring for about a four-week engagement. The circus was a wildly popular (and profitable) event which performed as often as three times daily throughout the life of the third Garden. The circus arrangement was so important to the Garden's schedule that it took priority over Rangers and Knicks playoff games and required both teams to find alternate sites. While the Knicks were able to play at the 69th Regiment Armory elsewhere in Manhattan, the Blueshirts were regularly forced to look further afield and decamp to other NHL cities if they advanced to a Stanley Cup final; indeed their first Cup win in 1928 was played entirely at the Montreal Forum, home ice of the opposing Montreal Maroons.

The circus acrobatics included acts in the rings, on the high wire, and trapeze. In the early 1930s wild animal trainer Clyde Beatty was a featured performer during the circus engagements in New York and Boston before returning to the Hagenbeck-Wallace Circus for a tour under canvas. Many of the most famous clowns in America appeared each year before hundreds of thousands of fans. Among the most famous were sad-faced clown Emmett Kelly as well as Felix Adler and Lou Jacobs.

==== Dog show ====
The Garden continued to host The Westminster Kennel Club's annual dog show. This championship is the third-longest continuously running U.S. sporting event (behind only the Kentucky Derby and Kentucky Oaks).

=== Other events ===
Anti-Nazi rally in MSG III (March 15, 1937)

- The very first event held at the third Garden was a six day bicycle race held from Sunday, November 29 to Friday, December 5, 1925, a few weeks before the official opening of the arena.
- Although MSG III never hosted a national political convention (see below), in 1932 Franklin Delano Roosevelt continued a tradition begun in 1892 by Grover Cleveland, when 22,000 people rallied to support him in his bid for the U.S. presidency. Herbert Hoover also delivered his final campaign speech for the 1932 election at the Garden. In 1936, Roosevelt delivered his last campaign speech there before the election.
- During the height of its popularity during the Great Depression, the Communist Party USA held mass rallies which filled the stadium.
- On March 15, 1937, a massive "Boycott Nazi Germany" rally was held in the Garden, sponsored by the American Jewish Congress and the Jewish Labor Committee. John L. Lewis of the Congress of Industrial Organizations and New York City mayor Fiorello LaGuardia were among the speakers.
- Ice skater and film star Sonia Henie brought her Hollywood Ice Review to the Garden in 1938, drawing more than 15,000 fans.
- On February 20, 1939, a pro-Nazi organization called German American Bund held a rally of 20,000 at the third Garden. By December 1941, the federal government had outlawed the group.
- In 1940, 13,000 people attended the rodeo, featuring Gene Autry.
- On March 9, 1942, a mass memorial service for the 2,000,000 Jews known to have been murdered by the Nazis to that time in Axis-occupied Europe, was held in the venue. The service was called We Will Never Die. 40,000 people attended the two performances that day.
- In October 1945, the American Zionist Emergency Council arranged a rally of at least 67,000 people in the Garden, calling for the establishment of a Jewish state in Palestine and for immigration restrictions on Jewish immigration to be lifted immediately. New York Governor Thomas E. Dewey spoke at the rally. The rally was accompanied by a march of 150,000 to 250,000 American Jews and non-Jews in Madison Square Park.
- In March 1946, another Palestine-related rally of 20,000 participants was held in the Garden, protesting against Britain's recent reversal of its pro-Zionist policies in Palestine. Among those who spoke at the rally were House Majority leader John W. McCormack, Senator James M. Mead, U.S. Solicitor General J. Howard McGrath, and William Bernard Ziff Sr., a prominent American endorser of Revisionist Zionism.
- In 1957, evangelist Billy Graham held a New York City mission at the Garden, which ran nightly for 16 weeks.
- Elizabeth Taylor was the host when Hollywood producer Mike Todd held an anniversary party for his film Around the World in 80 Days on October 17, 1957, featuring Marilyn Monroe riding an elephant.
- President John F. Kennedy's birthday party in May 1962 was held at the Garden, where Marilyn Monroe memorably sang "Happy Birthday, Mr. President".
- In the early 1960s, MSG III was the site of the Daily News Jazz Festival.

== Closure and demolition ==
On November 3, 1960, Penn Station's owners Pennsylvania Railroad announced they had sold their air rights to the Madison Square Garden Corporation to build a new arena replacing Penn Station's original building. Previously, the corporation had sought to replace the arena as early as 1946 due to poor sight lines from the upper decks and expanding attendance. Even though the Rangers played poorly during this time, they still sold out every game; added to the rising popularity of the Knicks, the demand for a new arena grew. Demolition of Penn Station commenced in 1963 with major controversy surrounding the demolition of a historic architectural landmark and the new Madison Square Garden was completed in 1968 with its first event being held on February 12, 1968. Originally the third Garden was planned to close at the end of the summer of 1967 but construction delays pushed the opening to February 1968. Their final Knicks game in Madison Square Garden was on February 10, a 115–97 win against the Philadelphia 76ers, just weeks after the 1968 NBA All-Star Game which was originally supposed to be held in the new Garden. The final Rangers game was held on February 11, 1968, resulting in a 3–3 tie against the Detroit Red Wings. Jean Ratelle was the last player to score a goal in the arena with 19:15 remaining in the third. After the game, former Ranger greats along with players representing other NHL teams over the previous 43 years, including New York Americans players Lorne Carr and Eddie Shore skated on the ice in a closure ceremony. Two days later, the last event in the Garden was the Westminster Dog Show.

There were no plans to keep the old Madison Square Garden and demolition commenced in the summer of 1968, finishing in early 1969. After the third Madison Square Garden was torn down, there was a proposal to build the world's tallest building on the site, prompting a major battle in the Hell's Kitchen neighborhood where it was located. Ultimately, the debate resulted in strict height restrictions in the area. The space remained a parking lot until 1989 when Worldwide Plaza, designed by David Childs of Skidmore, Owings and Merrill, opened on the site of the old Garden.

== In popular culture ==
- The 1936 Western musical film Rhythm on the Range, starring Bing Crosby, was filmed in part at MSG III during the 1935 rodeo.
- The 50th Street Garden never held a national Democratic or Republican presidential nominating convention, because neither party met in New York to select their presidential candidates between 1924 and 1976. Despite this, some of the climactic scenes of the thriller film The Manchurian Candidate (1962), in which a brainwashed assassin attempts to kill a presidential nominee at a convention, was filmed at the third Garden.
- MSG III was featured prominently in the story of Ron Howard's film Cinderella Man (2005), although exterior montage shots glorified it by placing it against the Times Square signs on Broadway, when in fact the building was one block west.
- Several Warner Bros. cartoons referred to the arena as "Madison Round Garden", and the Popeye cartoon Brotherly Love referred to the Garden as "Patterson Square Garden."
- Batman: The Animated Series had an episode where a robbery takes places at Gotham Square Garden.
- A 1958 episode of the CBS crime drama television series Richard Diamond, Private Detective entitled "Rodeo", starring David Janssen, is a dramatization of the murder of a rodeo performer, Ed Murdock, played by Lee Van Cleef, who seeks to reclaim the top prize at Madison Square Garden before he retires to an isolated ranch. His wife, Marcy (Barbara Baxley), conspires with Charles Decker (Harry Lauter) to have him murdered and to frame another rodeo performer for the crime. Dan Blocker appears in the episode as Cloudy Sims, still another rodeo cowboy.
- The Damon Runyon story "The Hottest Guy In The World" revolves around a fictional event where a baby is captured by a circus gorilla named Bongo who snatches the baby from a baby carriage and climbs up to the roof of the third Garden on the 49th Street side. The baby is saved by the character Big Jule shooting Bongo between the eyes, sending him backwards onto the roof.
- The Garden was featured in the 2023 film Sweetwater.

== See also ==
- Madison Square Garden (1879)
- Madison Square Garden Bowl

Preceded by Barton Street Arena	Home of the New York Americans; 1925–1942	Succeeded by last arena
Preceded by First arena	Home of the New York Rangers; 1926–1968	Succeeded by Madison Square Garden
Preceded by First arena	Home of the New York Knicks; 1946–1968	Succeeded by Madison Square Garden
